= List of birds of the Bahamas =

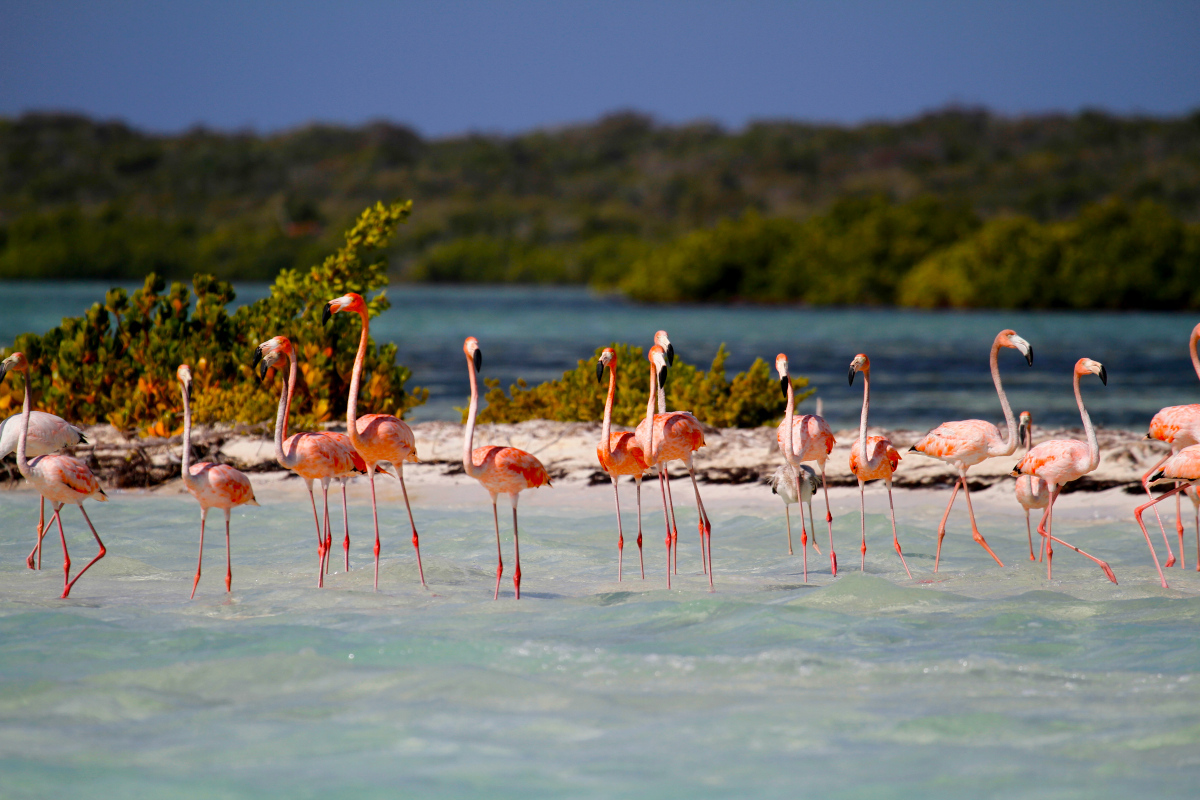
The American flamingo is the national bird of the Bahamas, here at Long Cay, Crooked Island

This is a list of the bird species recorded in the Bahamas. The avifauna of the Bahamas include a total of 388 species, according to Bird Checklists of the World (Avibase) as of July 2023. Of them, seven are endemic, 22 have been introduced by humans, and 212 are rare or accidental. 3 species listed are extinct (including one of the endemics) and two have been extirpated.

This list is presented in the taxonomic sequence of the Check-list of North and Middle American Birds, 7th edition through the 63rd Supplement, published by the American Ornithological Society (AOS). Common and scientific names are also those of the Check-list, except that the common names of families are from the Clements taxonomy because the AOS list does not include them.

The following tags have been used to highlight several categories of occurrence.

- (A) Accidental - a species that rarely or accidentally occurs in the Bahamas
- (E) Endemic - a species endemic to the Bahamas
- (I) Introduced - a species introduced to the Bahamas as a consequence, direct or indirect, of human actions
- (Ex) Extinct - a species which has ceased to exist
- (Er) Extirpated - a species that no longer occurs in the Bahamas although populations exist elsewhere

== Ducks, geese, and waterfowl ==
Order: Anseriformes Family: Anatidae

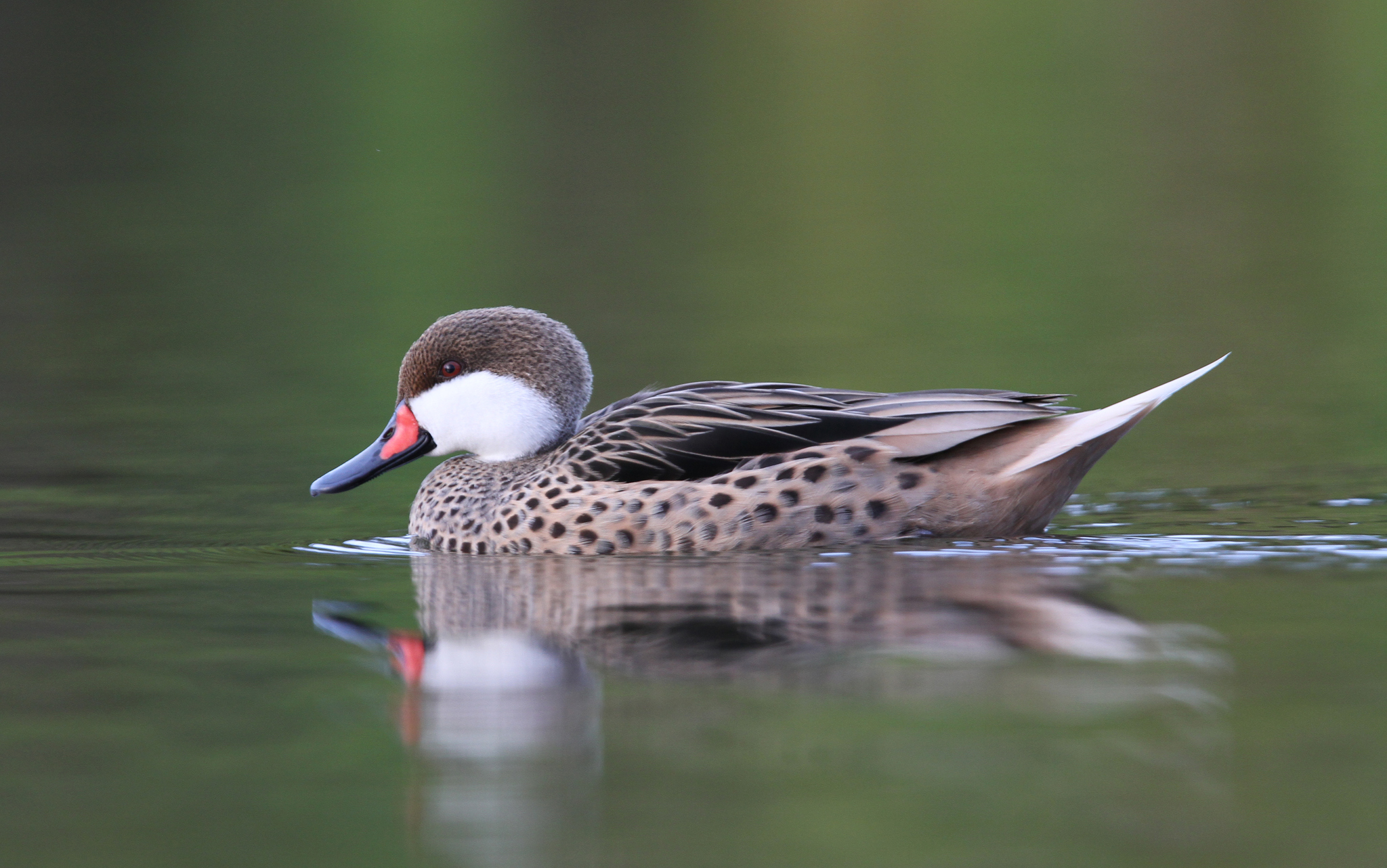
White-cheeked pintail, Treasure Cay, Great Abaco. This species was first described from the Bahamas.

Anatidae includes the ducks and most duck-like waterfowl, such as geese and swans. These birds are adapted to an aquatic existence with webbed feet, flattened bills, and feathers that are excellent at shedding water due to an oily coating.

- Black-bellied whistling duck, Dendrocygna autumnalis
- West Indian whistling duck, Dendrocygna arborea
- Fulvous whistling duck, Dendrocygna bicolor (A)
- Snow goose, Anser caerulescens
- Ross's goose, Anser rossii (A)
- Greater white-fronted goose, Anser albifrons (A)
- Brent goose, Branta bernicla (A)
- Canada goose, Branta canadensis
- Egyptian goose, Alopochen aegyptiaca (I)
- Muscovy duck, Cairina moschata
- Wood duck, Aix sponsa
- Blue-winged teal, Spatula discors
- Cinnamon teal, Spatula cyanoptera (A)
- Northern shoveler, Spatula clypeata
- Gadwall, Mareca strepera (A)
- Eurasian wigeon, Mareca penelope (A)
- American wigeon, Mareca americana
- Mallard, Anas platyrhynchos
- American black duck, Anas rubripes (A)
- Mottled duck, Anas fulvigula
- White-cheeked pintail, Anas bahamensis
- Northern pintail, Anas acuta
- Green-winged teal, Anas carolinensis
- Canvasback, Aythya valisineria (A)
- Redhead, Aythya americana
- Ring-necked duck, Aythya collaris
- Greater scaup, Aythya marila (A)
- Lesser scaup, Aythya affinis
- White-winged scoter, Melanitta deglandi (A)
- Bufflehead, Bucephala albeola (A)
- Hooded merganser, Lophodytes cucullatus (A)
- Red-breasted merganser, Mergus serrator
- Masked duck, Nomonyx dominicus (A)
- Ruddy duck, Oxyura jamaicensis

== New World quail ==
Order: Galliformes Family: Odontophoridae

The New World quails are small, plump terrestrial birds only distantly related to the quails of the Old World, but named for their similar appearance and habits.

- Northern bobwhite, Colinus virginianus (I)

== Pheasants, grouse, and allies ==
Order: Galliformes Family: Phasianidae The Phasianidae are a family of terrestrial birds which consists of quails, partridges, snowcocks, francolins, spurfowls, tragopans, monals, pheasants, peafowls, and jungle fowls. In general, they are plump (although they vary in size) and have broad, relatively short wings.

- Common pheasant, Phasianus colchicus (I)
- Indian peafowl, Pavo cristatus (I)
- Red junglefowl, Gallus gallus (I)
- Chukar partridge, Alectoris chukar (I)

== Flamingos ==
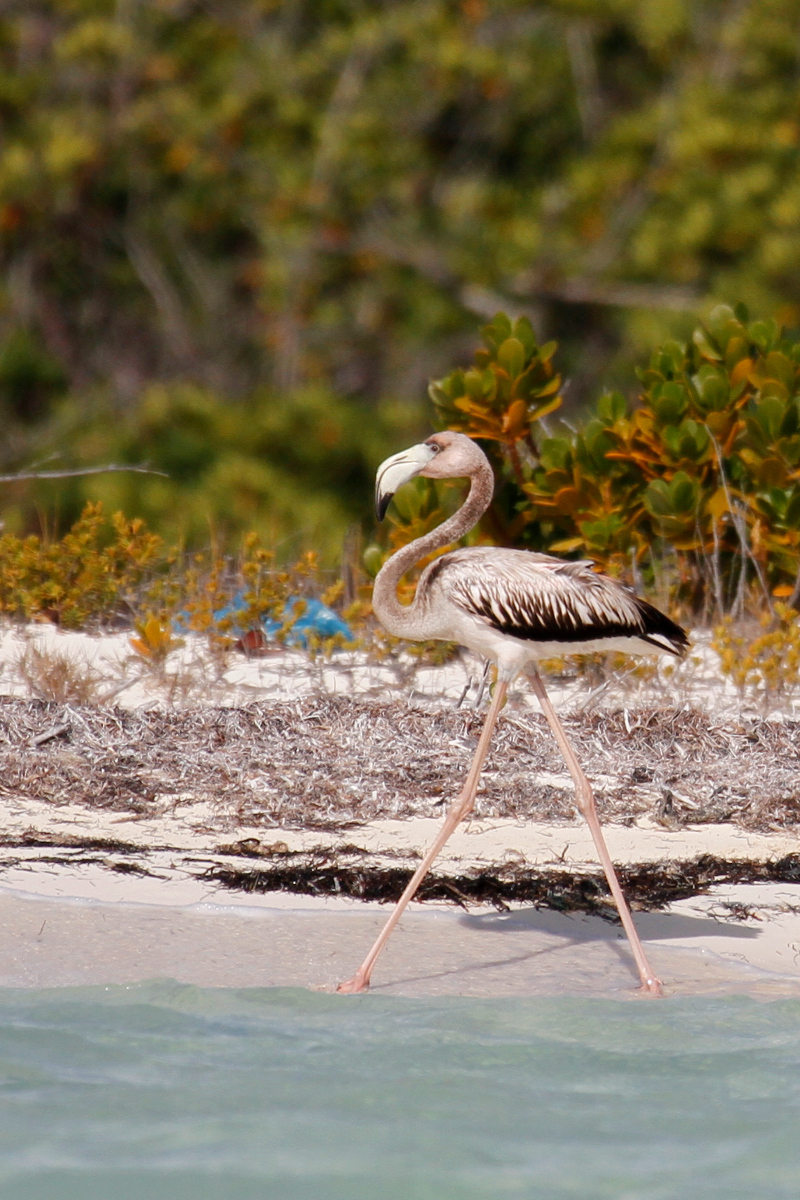
Juvenile American flamingo, Long Cay.

Order: Phoenicopteriformes Family: Phoenicopteridae

Flamingos are gregarious wading birds, usually 1 to 1.5 metres (3 to 5 ft) tall, found in both the Western and Eastern Hemispheres. Flamingos filter-feed on shellfish and algae. Their oddly shaped beaks are specially adapted to separate mud and silt from the food they consume and, uniquely, are used upside-down.

- American flamingo, Phoenicopterus ruber

== Grebes ==
Order: Podicipediformes Family: Podicipedidae

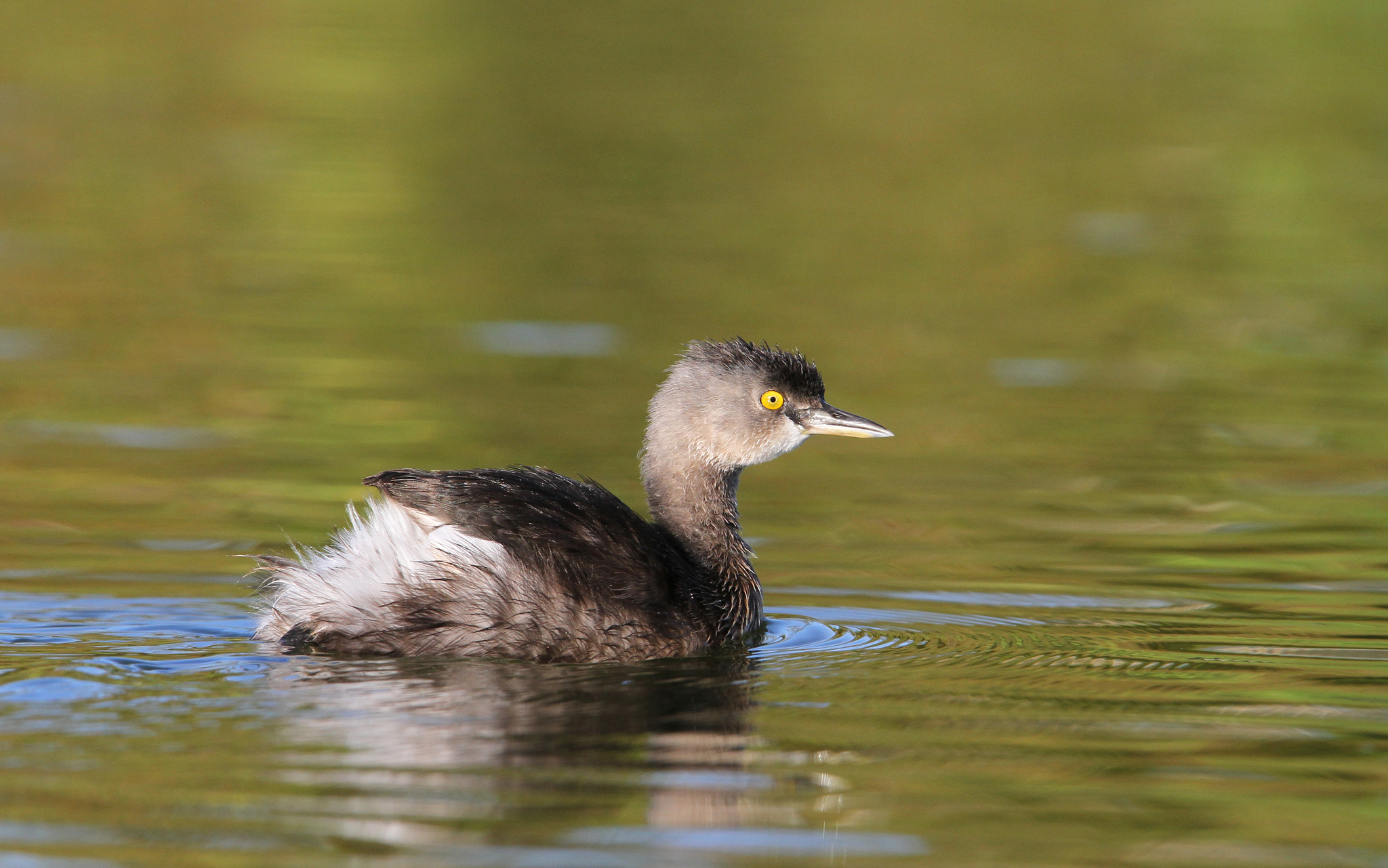
Least grebe, Treasure Cay.

Grebes are small to medium-large freshwater diving birds. They have lobed toes and are excellent swimmers and divers. However, they have their feet placed far back on the body, making them quite ungainly on land.

- Least grebe, Tachybaptus dominicus
- Pied-billed grebe, Podilymbus podiceps
- Red-necked grebe, Podiceps grisegena (A)
- Black-necked grebe, Podiceps nigricollis (A)

== Pigeons and doves ==
Order: Columbiformes Family: Columbidae Pigeons and doves are stout-bodied birds with short necks and short slender bills with a fleshy cere.

- Rock dove, Columba livia (I)
- Scaly-naped pigeon, Patagioenas squamosa
- White-crowned pigeon, Patagioenas leucocephala
- African collared dove, Streptopelia roseogrisea (I)
- Eurasian collared dove, Streptopelia decaocto (I)
- Common ground dove, Columbina passerina
- Key West quail-dove, Geotrygon chrysia
- Bridled quail-dove, Geotrygon mystacea
- Caribbean dove, Leptotila jamaicensis (I)
- White-winged dove, Zenaida asiatica
- Zenaida dove, Zenaida aurita
- Mourning dove, Zenaida macroura
- Pied imperial pigeon, Ducula bicolor (I)

== Cuckoos ==
Order: Cuculiformes Family: Cuculidae

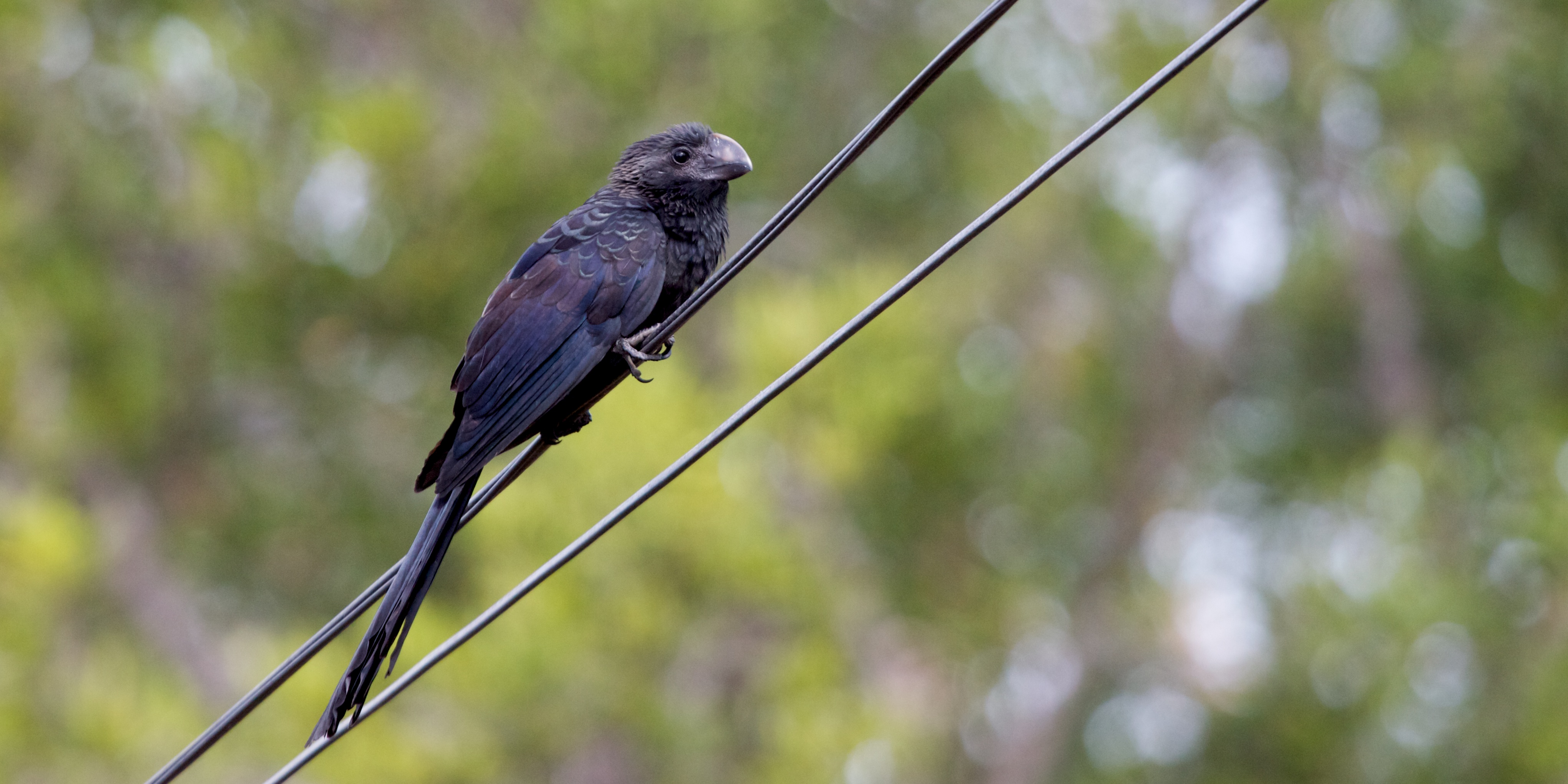
Smooth-billed ani, Nicholls Town.

The family Cuculidae includes cuckoos, roadrunners, and anis. These birds are of variable size with slender bodies, long tails, and strong legs. The Old World cuckoos are brood parasites.

- Smooth-billed ani, Crotophaga ani
- Yellow-billed cuckoo, Coccyzus americanus
- Mangrove cuckoo, Coccyzus minor
- Black-billed cuckoo, Coccyzus erythropthalmus (A)
- Great lizard cuckoo, Coccyzus merlini

== Nightjars and allies ==
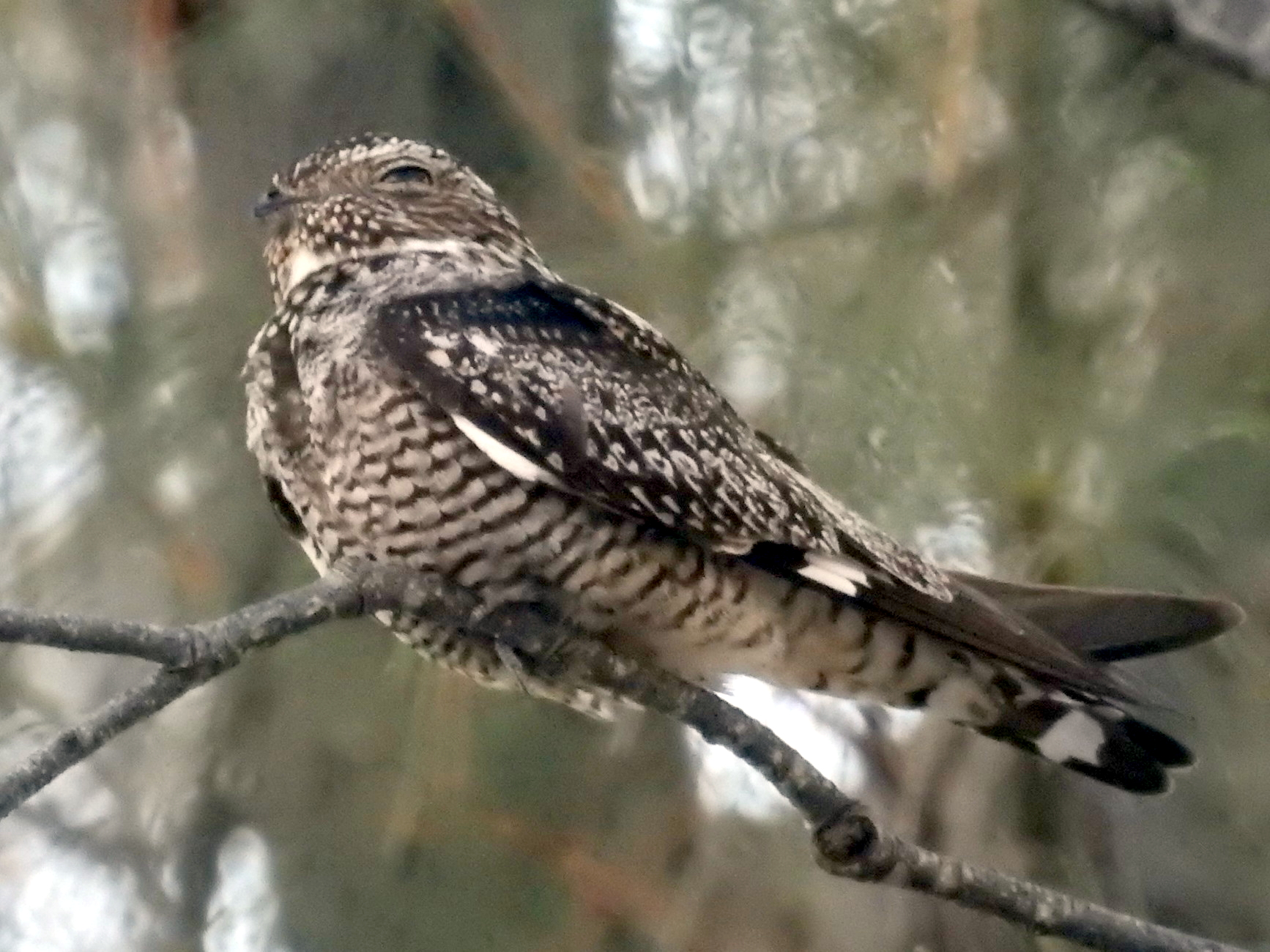
Antillean nighthawk, Nassau.

Order: Caprimulgiformes Family: Caprimulgidae

Nightjars are medium-sized nocturnal birds that usually nest on the ground. They have long wings, short legs, and very short bills. Most have small feet, of little use for walking, and long pointed wings. Their soft plumage is camouflaged to resemble bark or leaves.

- Common nighthawk, Chordeiles minor (A)
- Antillean nighthawk, Chordeiles gundlachii
- Chuck-will's-widow, Antrostomus carolinensis

== Swifts ==
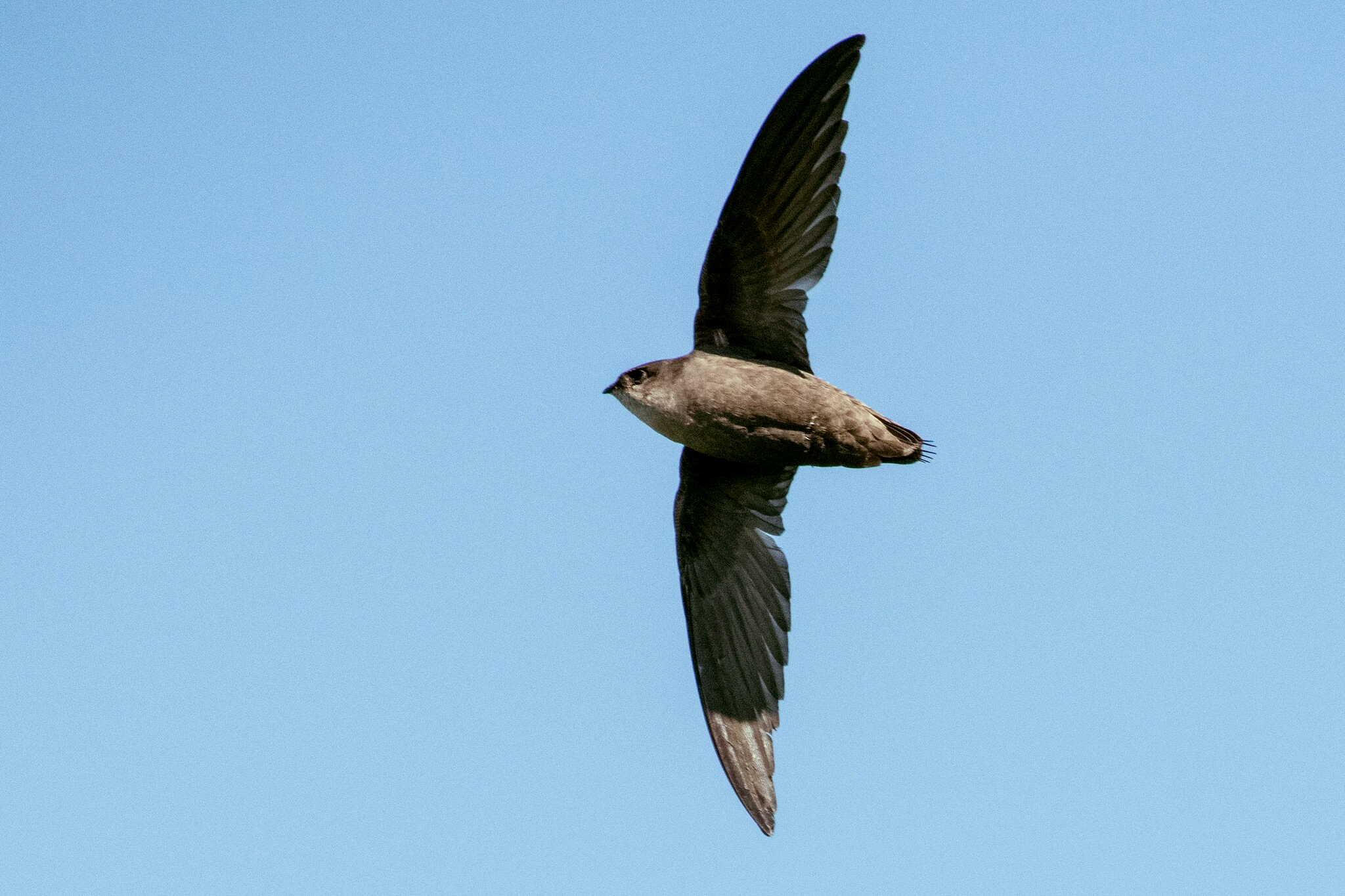
Chimney swift

Order: Apodiformes Family: Apodidae

Swifts are small birds which spend the majority of their lives flying. These birds have very short legs and never settle voluntarily on the ground, perching instead only on vertical surfaces. Many swifts have long swept-back wings which resemble a crescent or boomerang.

- Chimney swift, Chaetura pelagica
- Antillean palm swift, Tachornis phoenicobia (A)

== Hummingbirds ==
Order: Apodiformes Family: Trochilidae

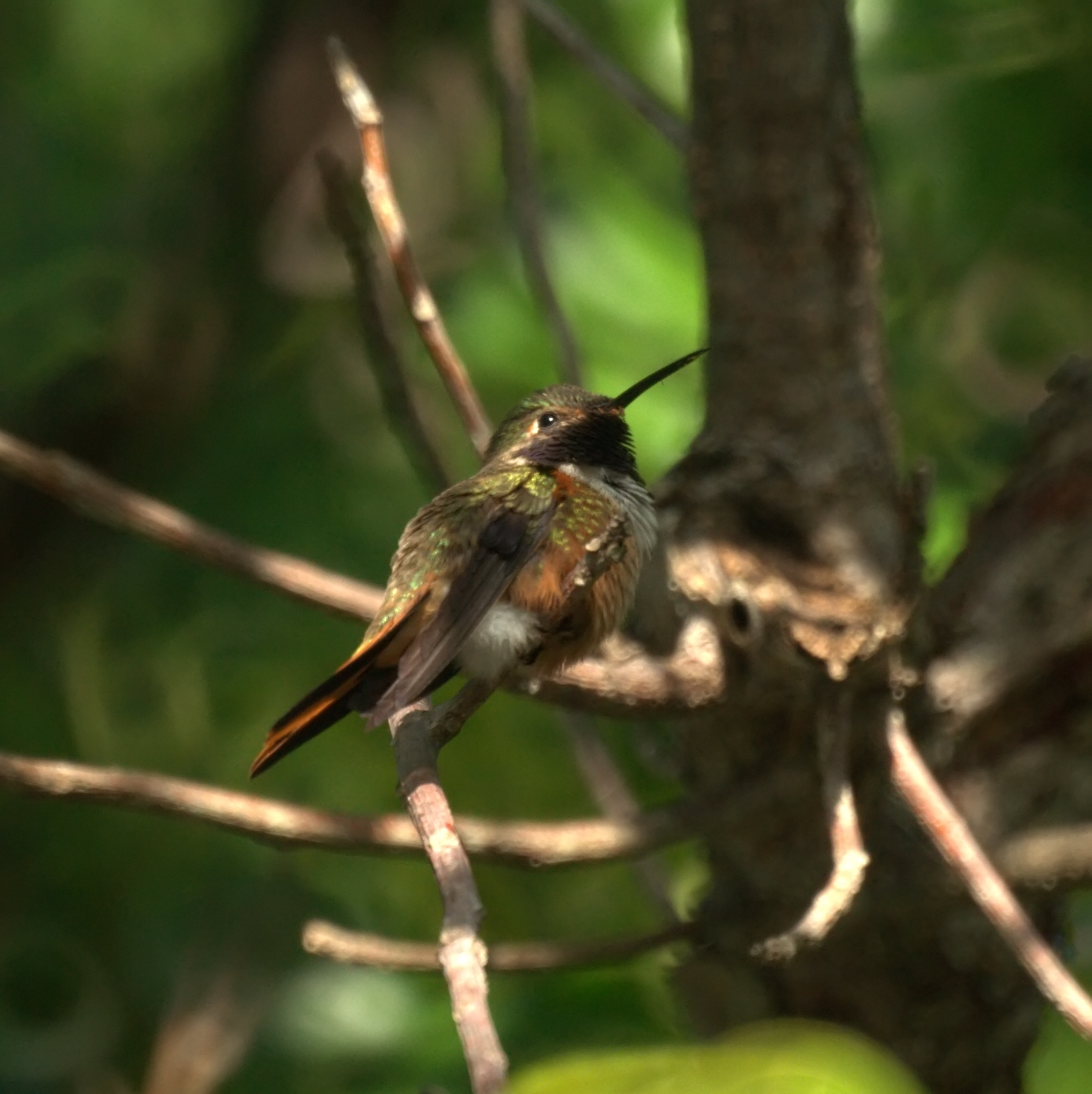
Bahama woodstar, North Eleuthera.

Hummingbirds are small birds capable of hovering in mid-air due to the rapid flapping of their wings. They are the only birds that can fly backwards.

- Green-breasted mango, Anthracothorax prevostii
- Ruby-throated hummingbird, Archilochus colubris
- Bahama woodstar, Nesophlox evelynae (E)
- Inagua woodstar, Nesophlox lyrura (E)
- Rufous hummingbird, Selasphorus rufus (A)
- Cuban emerald, Riccordia ricordii
- Brace's emerald, Riccordia bracei (E) (Ex)

== Rails, gallinules, and coots ==
Order: Gruiformes Family: Rallidae

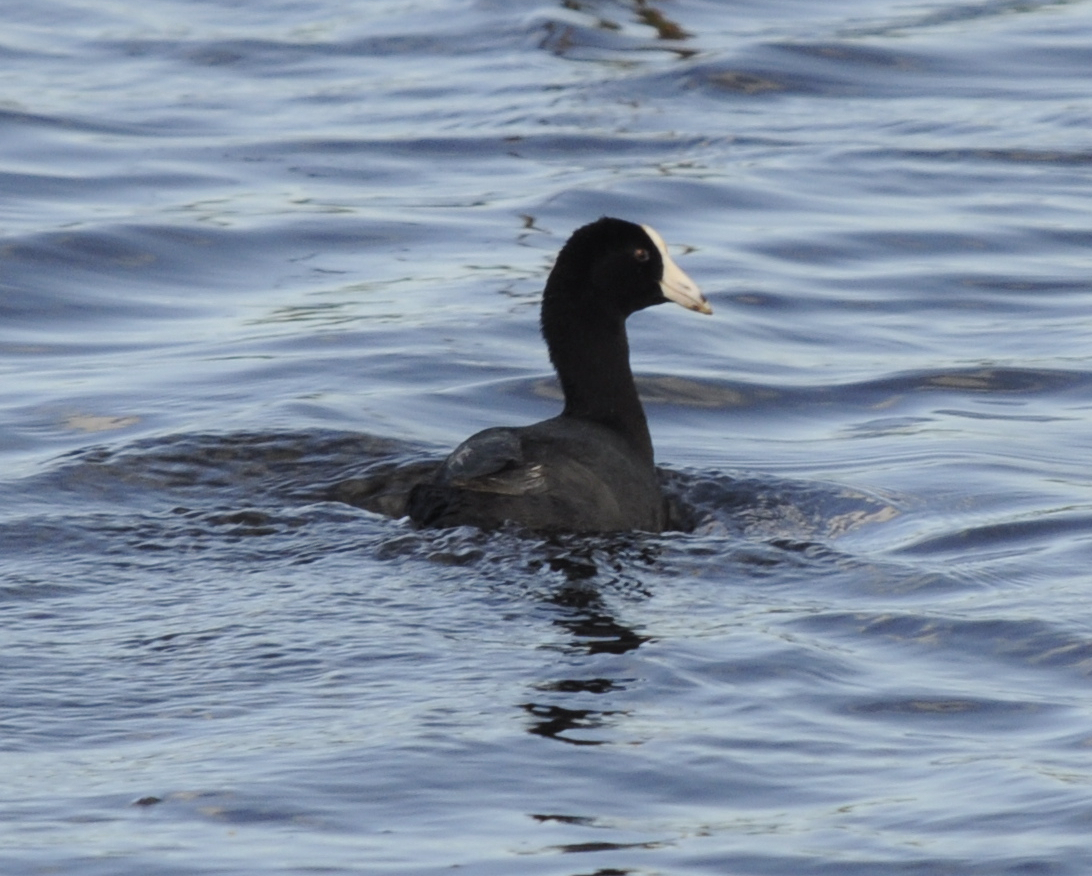
American coot

Rallidae is a large family of small to medium-sized birds which includes the rails, crakes, coots, and gallinules. Typically they inhabit dense vegetation in damp environments near lakes, swamps, or rivers. In general they are shy and secretive birds, making them difficult to observe. Most species have strong legs and long toes which are well adapted to soft uneven surfaces. They tend to have short, rounded wings and to be weak fliers.

- Clapper rail, Rallus crepitans
- Virginia rail, Rallus limicola (A)
- Sora, Porzana carolina
- Common gallinule, Gallinula galeata
- American coot, Fulica americana
- American purple gallinule, Porphyrio martinica
- Yellow rail, Coturnicops noveboracensis (A)
- Black rail, Laterallus jamaicensis

== Limpkin ==
Order: Gruiformes Family: Aramidae

The limpkin resembles a large rail. It has drab-brown plumage and a greyer head and neck.

- Limpkin, Aramus guarauna

== Cranes ==
Order: Gruiformes Family: Gruidae

Cranes are large, long-legged, and long-necked birds. Unlike the similar-looking but unrelated herons, cranes fly with necks outstretched, not pulled back. Most have elaborate and noisy courting displays or "dances".

- Sandhill crane, Antigone canadensis (A)

== Thick-knees ==
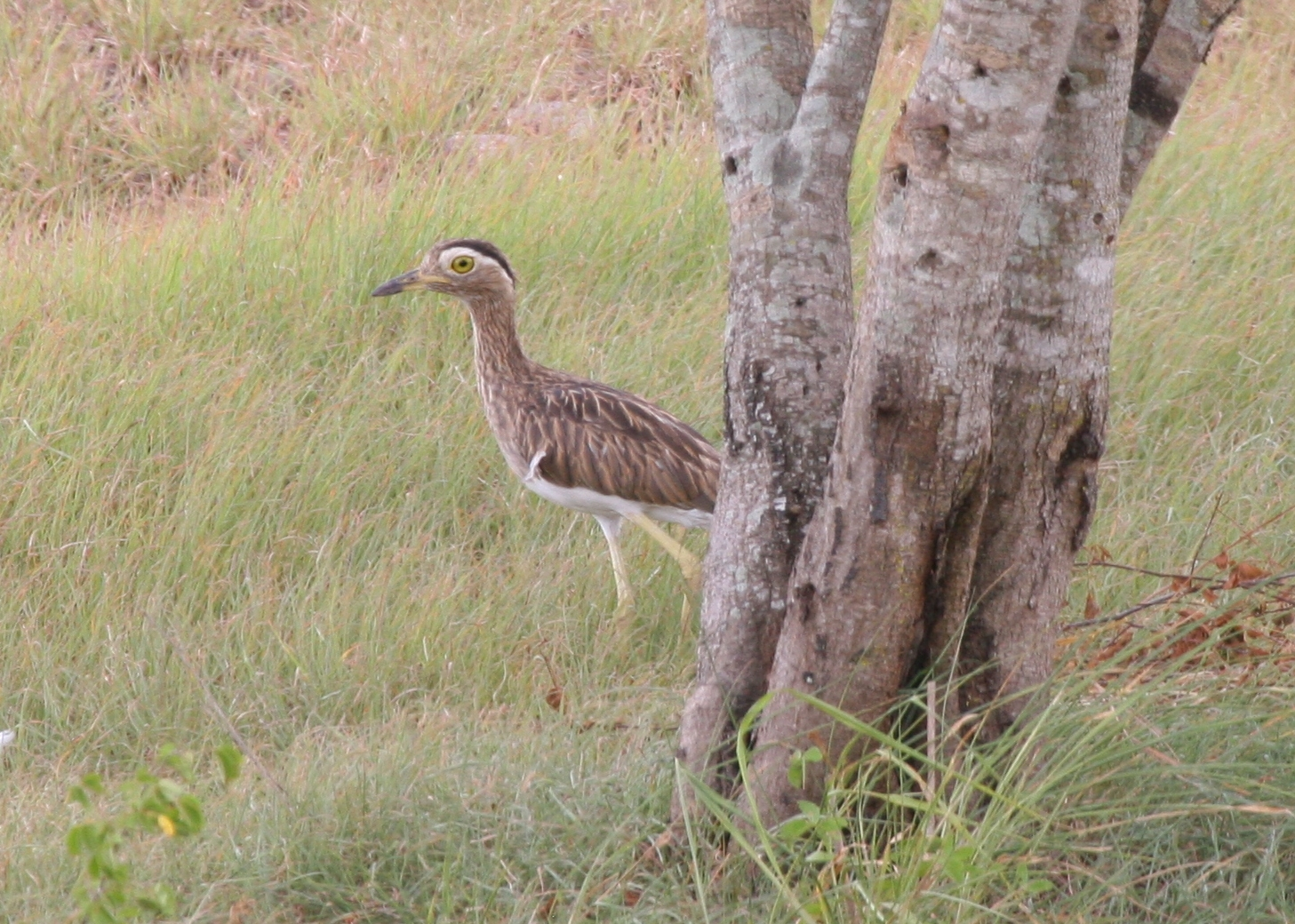
Double striped thick knee

Order: Charadriiformes Family: Burhinidae

The thick-knees are a group of waders found worldwide within the tropical zone, with some species also breeding in temperate Europe and Australia. They are medium to large waders with strong black or yellow-black bills, large yellow eyes, and cryptic plumage. Despite being classed as waders, most species have a preference for arid or semi-arid habitats.

- Double-striped thick-knee, Burhinus bistriatus

== Stilts and avocets ==
Order: Charadriiformes Family: Recurvirostridae

Recurvirostridae is a family of large wading birds which includes the avocets and stilts. The avocets have long legs and long up-curved bills. The stilts have extremely long legs and long, thin, straight bills.

- Black-necked stilt, Himantopus mexicanus
- American avocet, Recurvirostra americana

== Oystercatchers ==
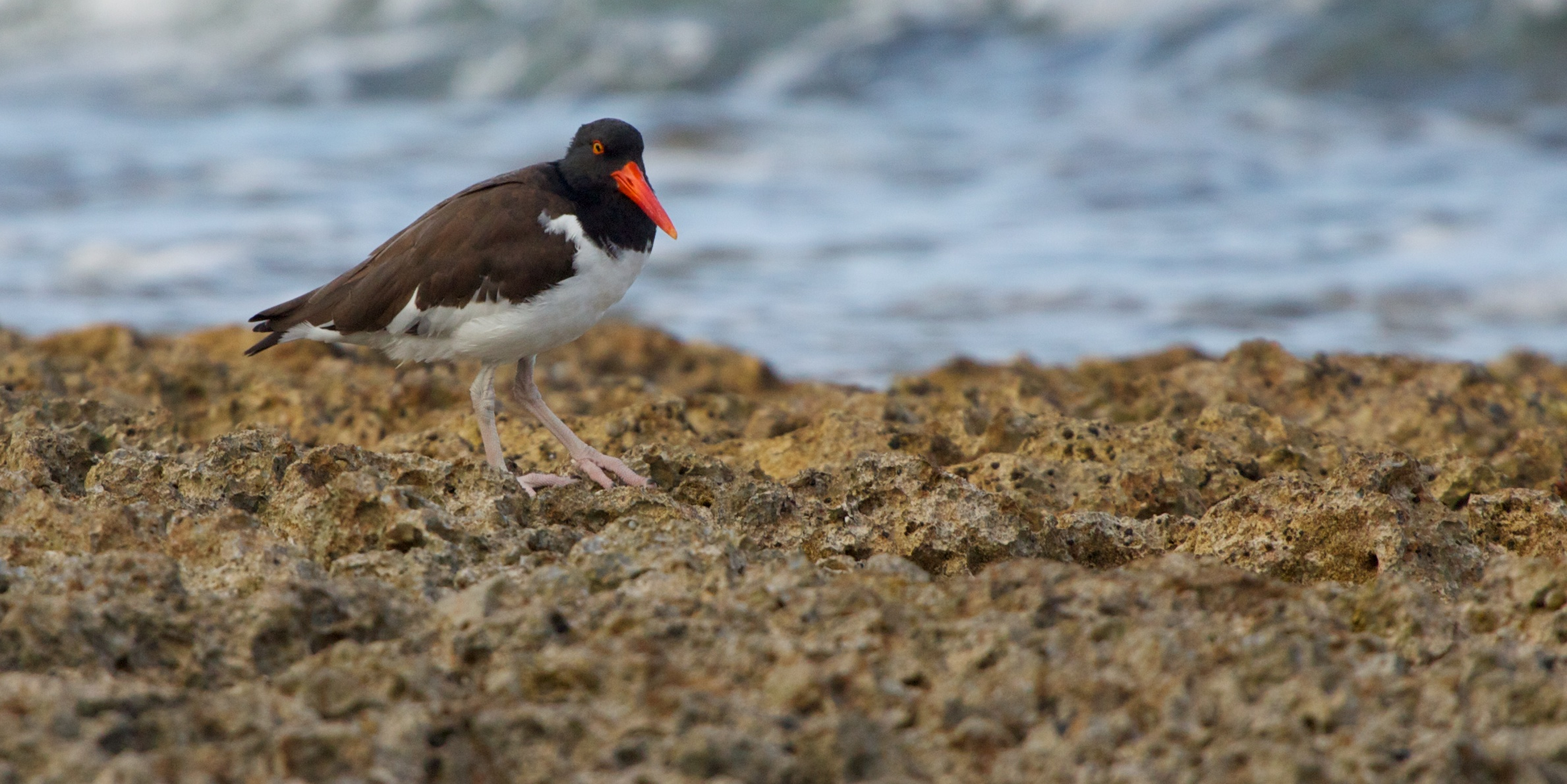
American oystercatcher, Nicholls Town.

Order: Charadriiformes Family: Haematopodidae

The oystercatchers are large and noisy plover-like birds, with strong bills used for smashing or prising open molluscs.

- American oystercatcher, Haematopus palliatus

== Plovers and lapwings ==
Order: Charadriiformes Family: Charadriidae

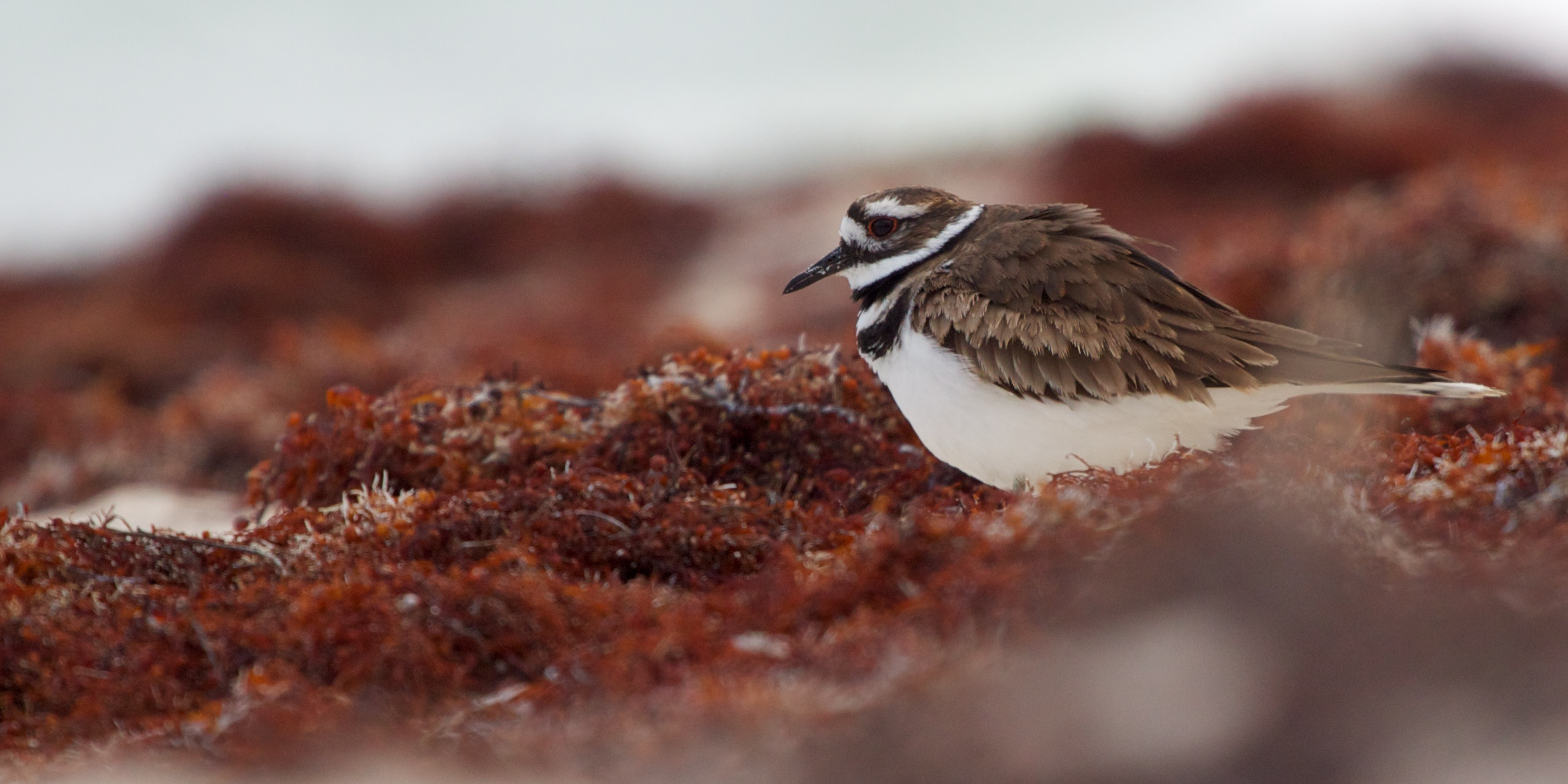
Killdeer, Nicholls Town.

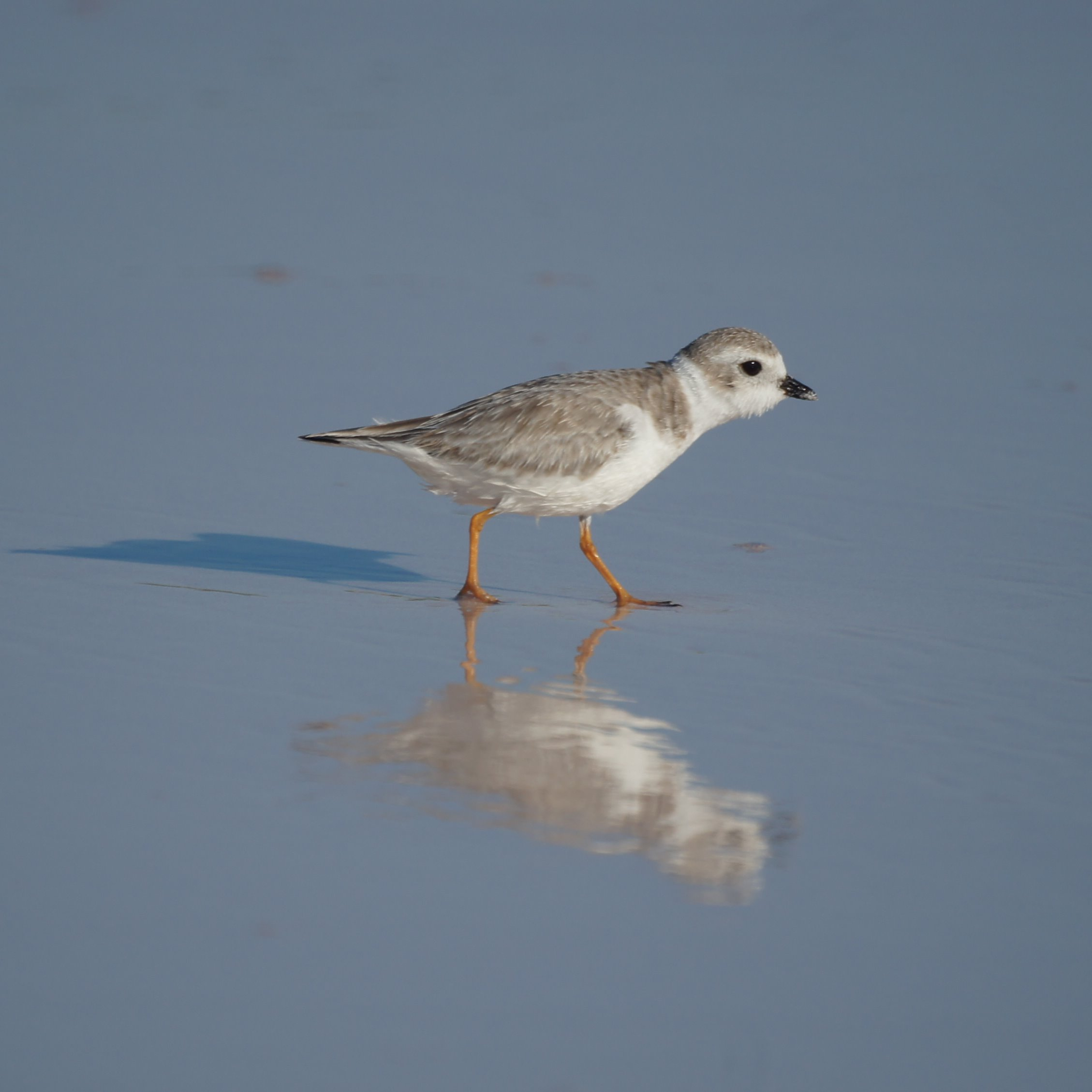
Piping plover, Harbour Island.

The family Charadriidae includes the plovers, dotterels, and lapwings. They are small to medium-sized birds with compact bodies, short thick necks, and long, usually pointed, wings. They are found in open country worldwide, mostly in habitats near water.

- Northern lapwing, Vanellus vanellus (A)
- Grey plover, Pluvialis squatarola
- American golden plover, Pluvialis dominica
- Pacific golden plover, Pluvialis fulva (A)
- Killdeer, Charadrius vociferus
- Semipalmated plover, Charadrius semipalmatus
- Piping plover, Charadrius melodus
- Wilson's plover, Charadrius wilsonia
- Snowy plover, Charadrius nivosus

== Sandpipers and allies ==
Order: Charadriiformes Family: Scolopacidae

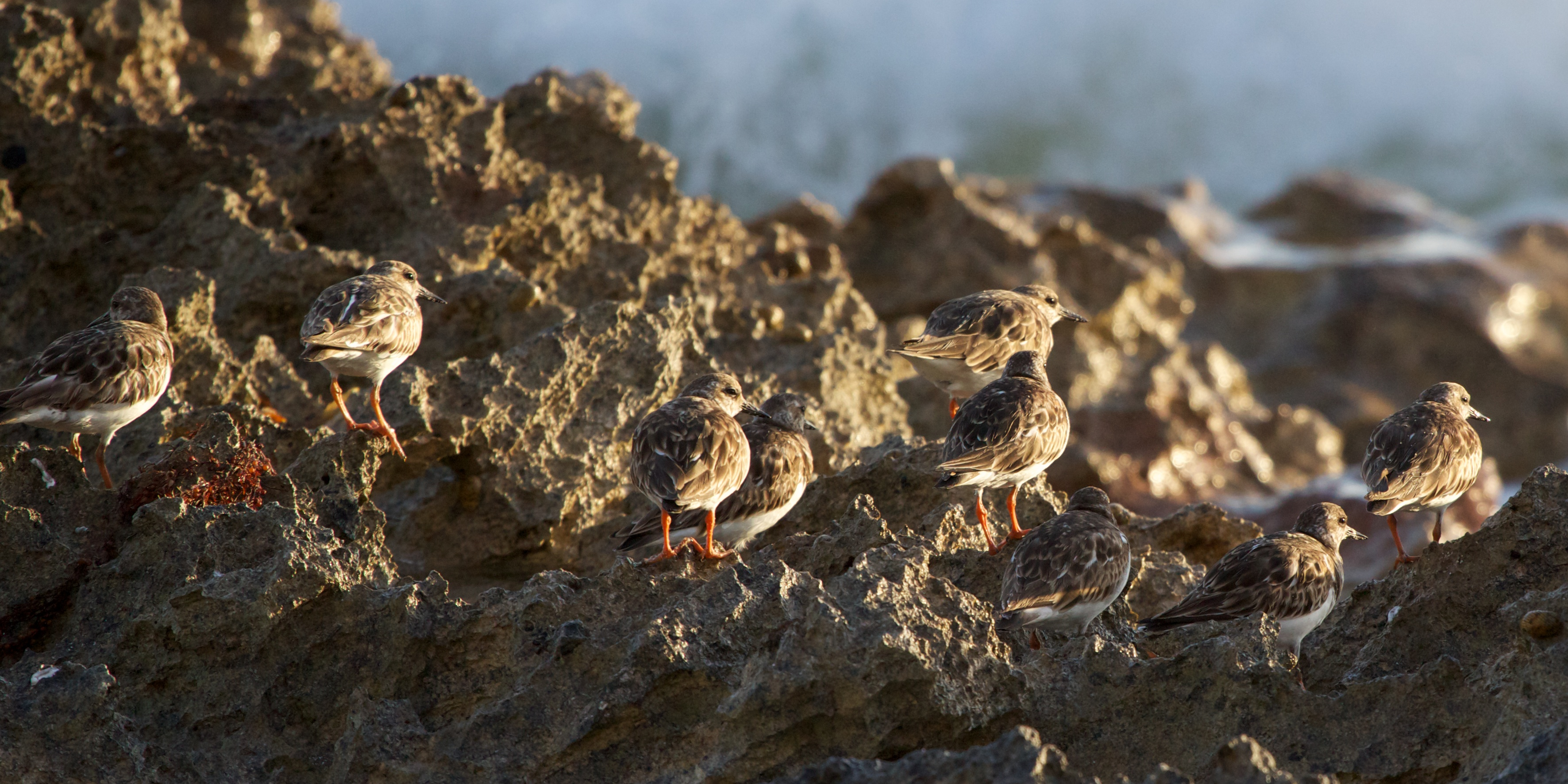
Ruddy Turnstones, Nicholls Town.

Scolopacidae is a large diverse family of small to medium-sized shorebirds including the sandpipers, curlews, godwits, shanks, tattlers, woodcocks, snipes, dowitchers, and phalaropes. The majority of these species eat small invertebrates picked out of the mud or soil. Variation in length of legs and bills enables multiple species to feed in the same habitat, particularly on the coast, without direct competition for food.

- Upland sandpiper, Bartramia longicauda
- Hudsonian whimbrel, Numenius hudsonicus
- Eurasian curlew, Numenius arquata (A)
- Hudsonian godwit, Limosa haemastica
- Marbled godwit, Limosa fedoa (A)
- Ruddy turnstone, Arenaria interpres
- Red knot, Calidris canutus
- Ruff, Calidris pugnax (A)
- Stilt sandpiper, Calidris himantopus
- Sanderling, Calidris alba
- Dunlin, Calidris alpina
- Least sandpiper, Calidris minutilla
- White-rumped sandpiper, Calidris fuscicollis
- Buff-breasted sandpiper, Calidris subruficollis (A)
- Pectoral sandpiper, Calidris melanotos
- Semipalmated sandpiper, Calidris pusilla
- Western sandpiper, Calidris mauri
- Short-billed dowitcher, Limnodromus griseus
- Long-billed dowitcher, Limnodromus scolopaceus
- Wilson's snipe, Gallinago delicata
- Spotted sandpiper, Actitis macularia
- Solitary sandpiper, Tringa solitaria
- Lesser yellowlegs, Tringa flavipes
- Willet, Tringa semipalmata
- Greater yellowlegs, Tringa melanoleuca
- Wilson's phalarope, Phalaropus tricolor (A)
- Red-necked phalarope, Phalaropus lobatus (A)
- Red phalarope, Phalaropus fulicarius (A)

== Skuas and jaegers ==
Order: Charadriiformes Family: Stercorariidae The family Stercorariidae are, in general, medium to large birds, typically with grey or brown plumage, often with white markings on the wings. They nest on the ground in temperate and arctic regions and are long-distance migrants.

- South polar skua, Stercorarius maccormicki (A)
- Pomarine skua, Stercorarius pomarinus
- Arctic skua, Stercorarius parasiticus
- Long-tailed skua, Stercorarius longicaudus (A)

== Auks, murres, and puffins ==
Order: Charadriiformes Family: Alcidae

Alcids are superficially similar to penguins due to their black-and-white plumage, their upright posture, and some of their habits, however they are not related to the penguins and differ in being able to fly. Auks live on the open sea, only deliberately coming ashore to nest.

- Little auk, Alle alle (A)
- Great auk, Pinguinus impennis (Ex)

== Gulls, terns, and skimmers ==
Order: Charadriiformes Family: Laridae

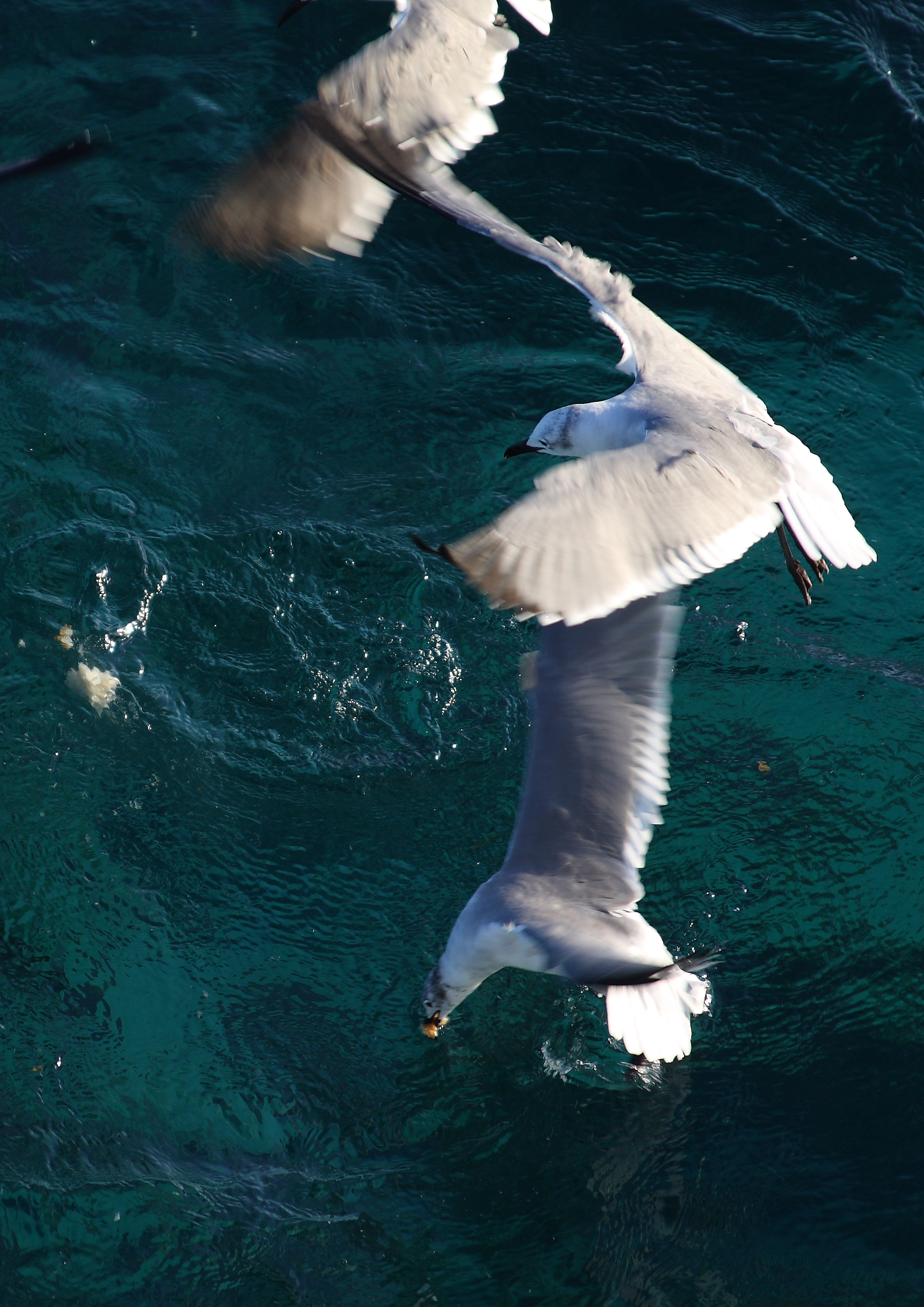
Laughing gulls, Nassau.

Laridae is a family of medium to large seabirds and includes gulls, kittiwakes, terns, and skimmers. They are typically grey or white, often with black markings on the head or wings. They have longish bills and webbed feet. Terns are a group of generally medium to large seabirds typically with grey or white plumage, often with black markings on the head. Most terns hunt fish by diving but some pick insects off the surface of fresh water. Terns are generally long-lived birds, with several species known to live in excess of 30 years. Skimmers are a small family of tropical tern-like birds. They have an elongated lower mandible which they use to feed by flying low over the water surface and skimming the water for small fish.

- Black-legged kittiwake, Rissa tridactyla (A)
- Bonaparte's gull, Chroicocephalus philadelphia
- Black-headed gull, Chroicocephalus ridibundus (A)
- Laughing gull, Leucophaeus atricilla
- Franklin's gull, Leucophaeus pipixcan (A)
- Ring-billed gull, Larus delawarensis
- American herring gull, Larus smithsonianus
- Lesser black-backed gull, Larus fuscus
- Great black-backed gull, Larus marinus
- Brown noddy, Anous stolidus
- White tern, Gygis alba (A)
- Sooty tern, Onychoprion fuscata
- Bridled tern, Onychoprion anaethetus
- Least tern, Sternula antillarum
- Gull-billed tern, Gelochelidon nilotica
- Caspian tern, Hydroprogne caspia
- Black tern, Chlidonias niger
- White-winged tern, Chlidonias leucopterus (A)
- Whiskered tern, Chlidonias hybrida (A)
- Roseate tern, Sterna dougallii
- Common tern, Sterna hirundo
- Arctic tern, Sterna paradisaea (A)
- Forster's tern, Sterna forsteri (A)
- Royal tern, Thalasseus maxima
- Cabot's tern, Thalasseus acuflavidus
- Black skimmer, Rynchops niger

== Tropicbirds ==
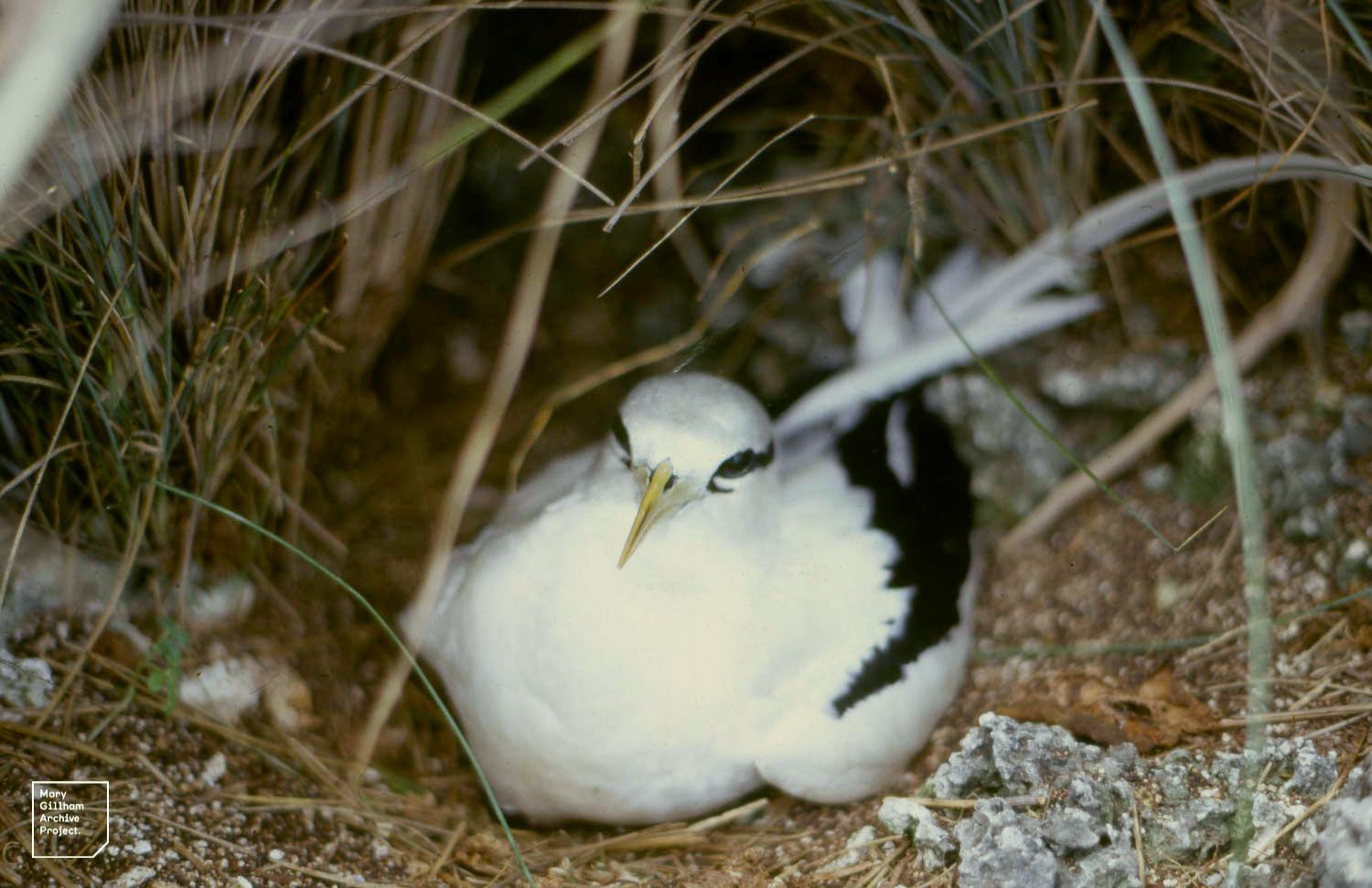
White tailed tropicbird, Berry Islands, North Bahama

Order: Phaethontiformes Family: Phaethontidae

Tropicbirds are slender white birds of tropical oceans with exceptionally long central tail feathers. Their heads and long wings have black markings.

- White-tailed tropicbird, Phaethon lepturus
- Red-billed tropicbird, Phaethon aethereus

== Albatrosses ==
Order: Procellariiformes Family: Diomedeidae

The albatrosses are among the largest of flying birds, and the great albatrosses of the genus Diomedea have the largest wingspans of any extant birds.

- Black-browed albatross, Thalassarche melanophris (A)

== Southern storm petrels ==
Order: Procellariiformes Family: Oceanitidae

The storm petrels are the smallest seabirds, relatives of the petrels, feeding on planktonic crustaceans and small fish picked from the surface, typically while hovering. The flight is fluttering and sometimes bat-like. Until 2018, this family's species were included with the other storm-petrels in family Hydrobatidae.

- Wilson's storm petrel, Oceanites oceanicus

== Northern storm petrels ==
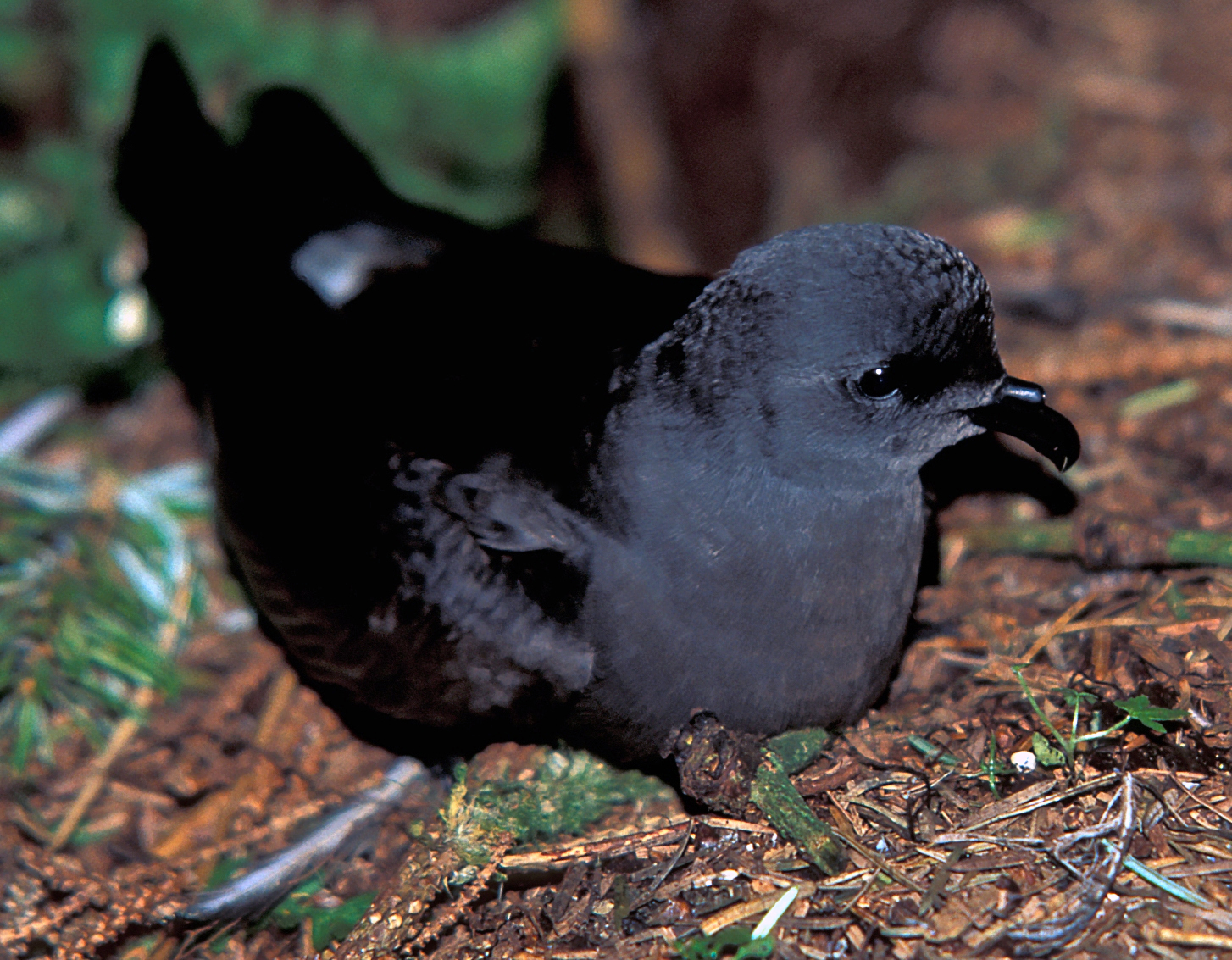
Leach's storm petrel

Order: Procellariiformes Family: Hydrobatidae

Though the members of this family are similar in many respects to the southern storm-petrels, including their general appearance and habits, there are enough genetic differences to warrant their placement in a separate family.

- Leach's storm petrel, Hydrobates leucorhous
- Band-rumped storm petrel, Hydrobates castro (A)

== Shearwaters and petrels ==
Order: Procellariiformes Family: Procellariidae

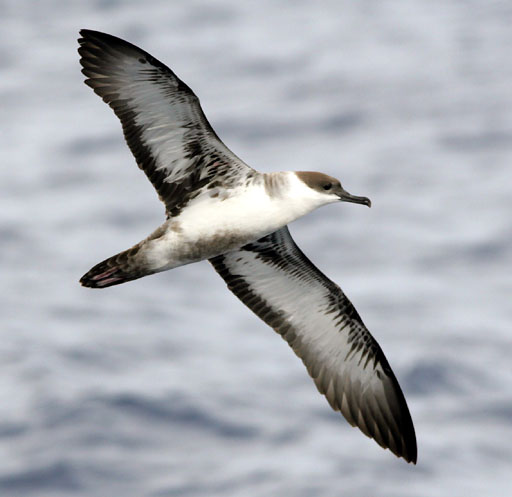
Great shearwater

The procellariids are the main group of medium-sized petrels and shearwaters characterised by united nostrils with medium septum and a long outer functional primary.

- Northern fulmar, Fulmarus glacialis (A)
- Trindade petrel, Pterodroma arminjoniana (A)
- Bermuda petrel, Pterodroma cahow (A)
- Black-capped petrel, Pterodroma hasitata
- Cory's shearwater, Calonectris borealis (A)
- Sooty shearwater, Ardenna griseus (A)
- Great shearwater, Ardenna gravis
- Manx shearwater, Puffinus puffinus (A)
- Sargasso shearwater, Puffinus lherminieri
- Barolo shearwater, Puffinus baroli (A)

== Storks ==
Order: Ciconiiformes Family: Ciconiidae

Storks are large, long-legged, long-necked, wading birds with long, stout bills. Storks are mute, but bill-clattering is an important mode of communication at the nest. Their nests can be large and may be reused for many years. Many species are migratory.

- Wood stork, Mycteria americana (A)

== Frigatebirds ==
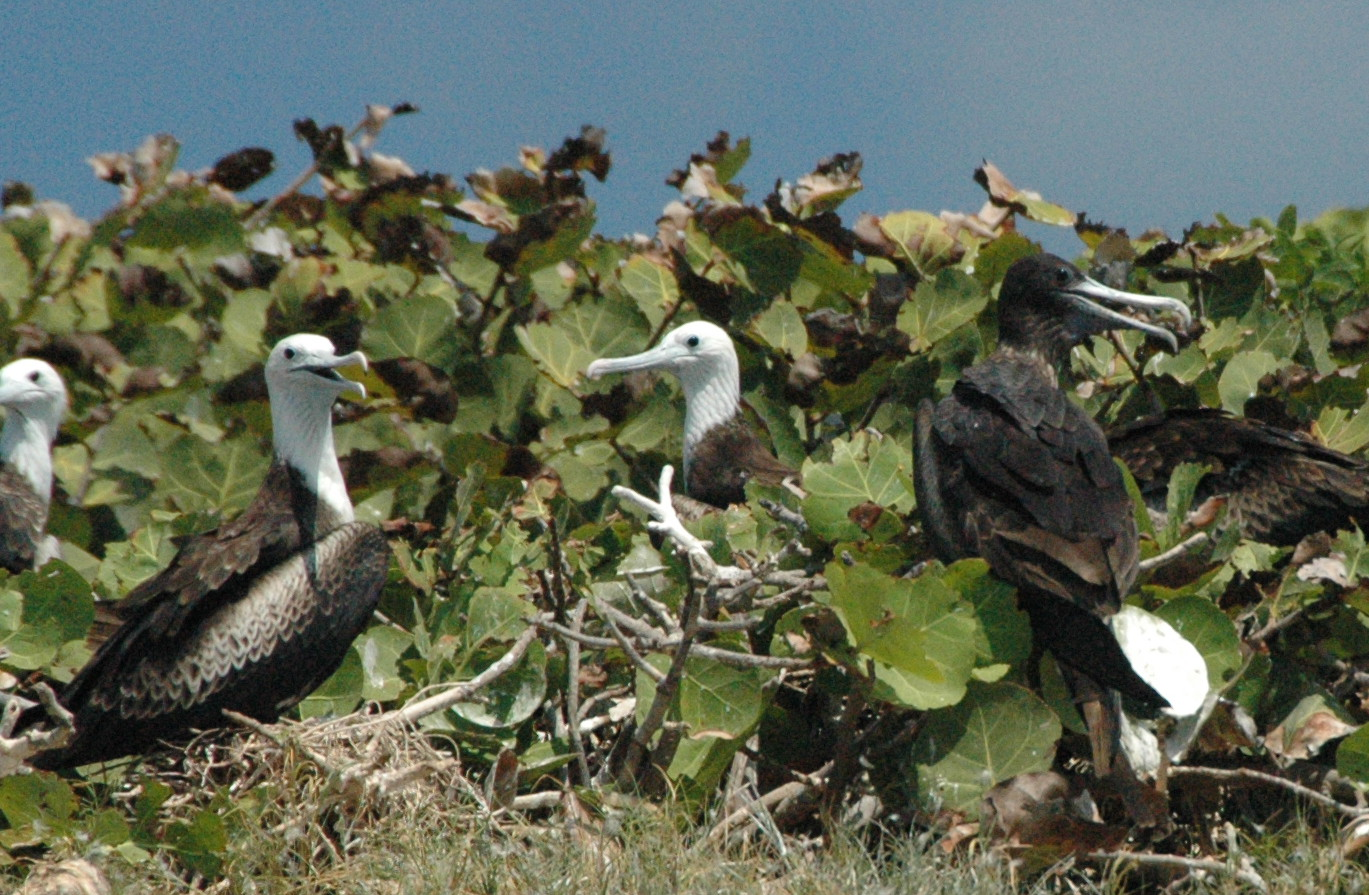
Magnificent frigatebirds, Catto Cay, off San Salvador Island.

Order: Suliformes Family: Fregatidae

Frigatebirds are large seabirds usually found over tropical oceans. They are large, black-and-white, or completely black, with long wings and deeply forked tails. The males have coloured inflatable throat pouches. They do not swim or walk and cannot take off from a flat surface. Having the largest wingspan-to-body-weight ratio of any bird, they are essentially aerial, able to stay aloft for more than a week.

- Magnificent frigatebird, Fregata magnificens

== Boobies and gannets ==
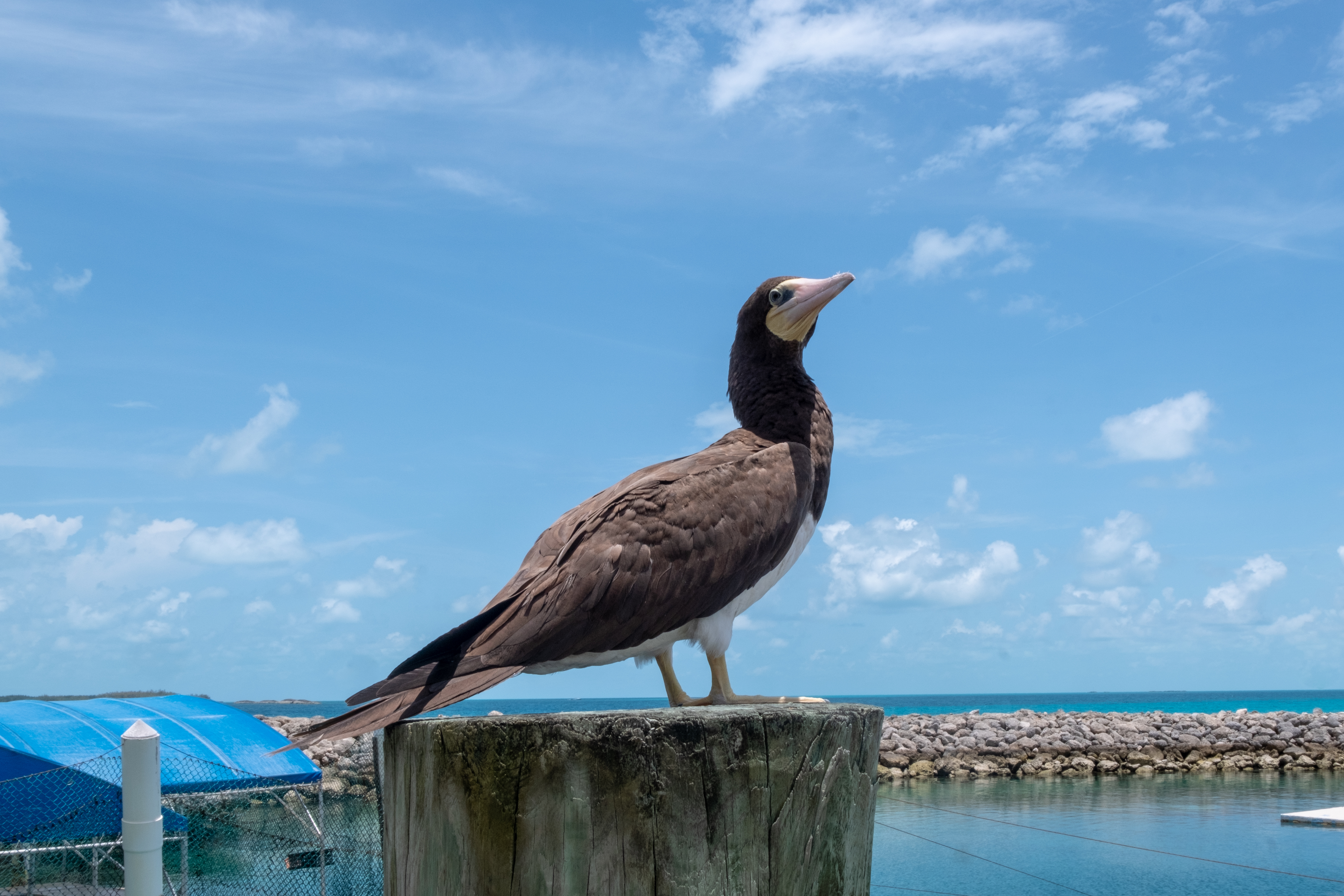
Brown booby, Blue Lagoon Island.

Order: Suliformes Family: Sulidae

The sulids comprise the gannets and boobies. Both groups are medium to large coastal seabirds that plunge-dive for fish.

- Masked booby, Sula dactylatra
- Brown booby, Sula leucogaster
- Red-footed booby, Sula sula
- Northern gannet, Morus bassanus

== Anhingas ==
Order: Suliformes Family: Anhingidae

Anhingas are often called "snake-birds" because of their long thin neck, which gives a snake-like appearance when they swim with their bodies submerged. The males have black and dark-brown plumage, an erectile crest on the nape, and a larger bill than the female. The females have much paler plumage especially on the neck and underparts. The darters have completely webbed feet and their legs are short and set far back on the body. Their plumage is somewhat permeable, like that of cormorants, and they spread their wings to dry after diving.

- Anhinga, Anhinga anhinga

== Cormorants and shags ==
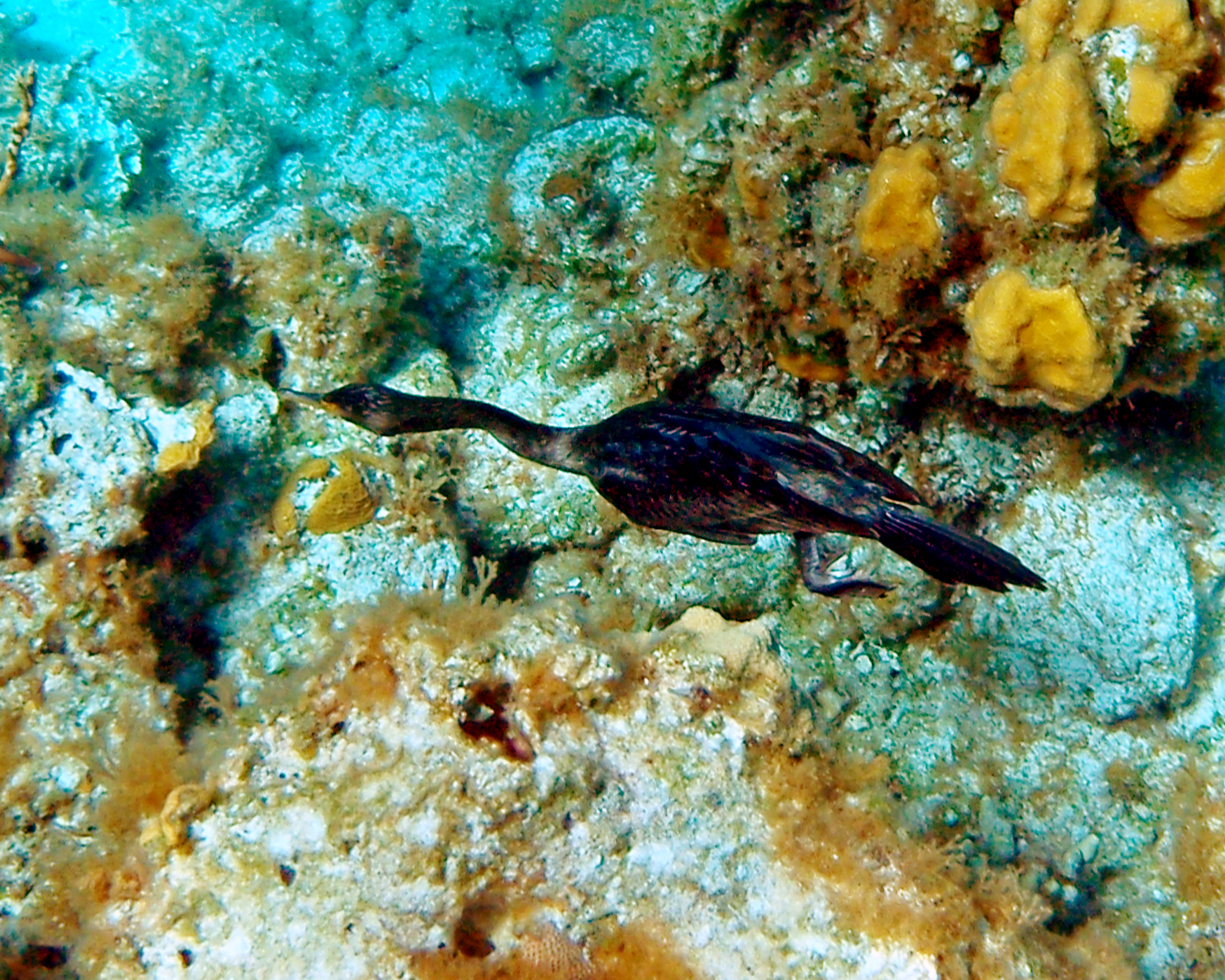
Double crested cormorant, Bahamas endemic subspecies Nannopterum auritum heuretum San Salvador Island.

Order: Suliformes Family: Phalacrocoracidae

Phalacrocoracidae is a family of medium to large coastal, fish-eating seabirds that includes cormorants and shags. Plumage colour varies, with the majority having mainly dark plumage, some species being black-and-white, and a few being colourful.

- Double-crested cormorant, Nannopterum auritum
- Neotropic cormorant, Nannopterum brasilianum

== Pelicans ==
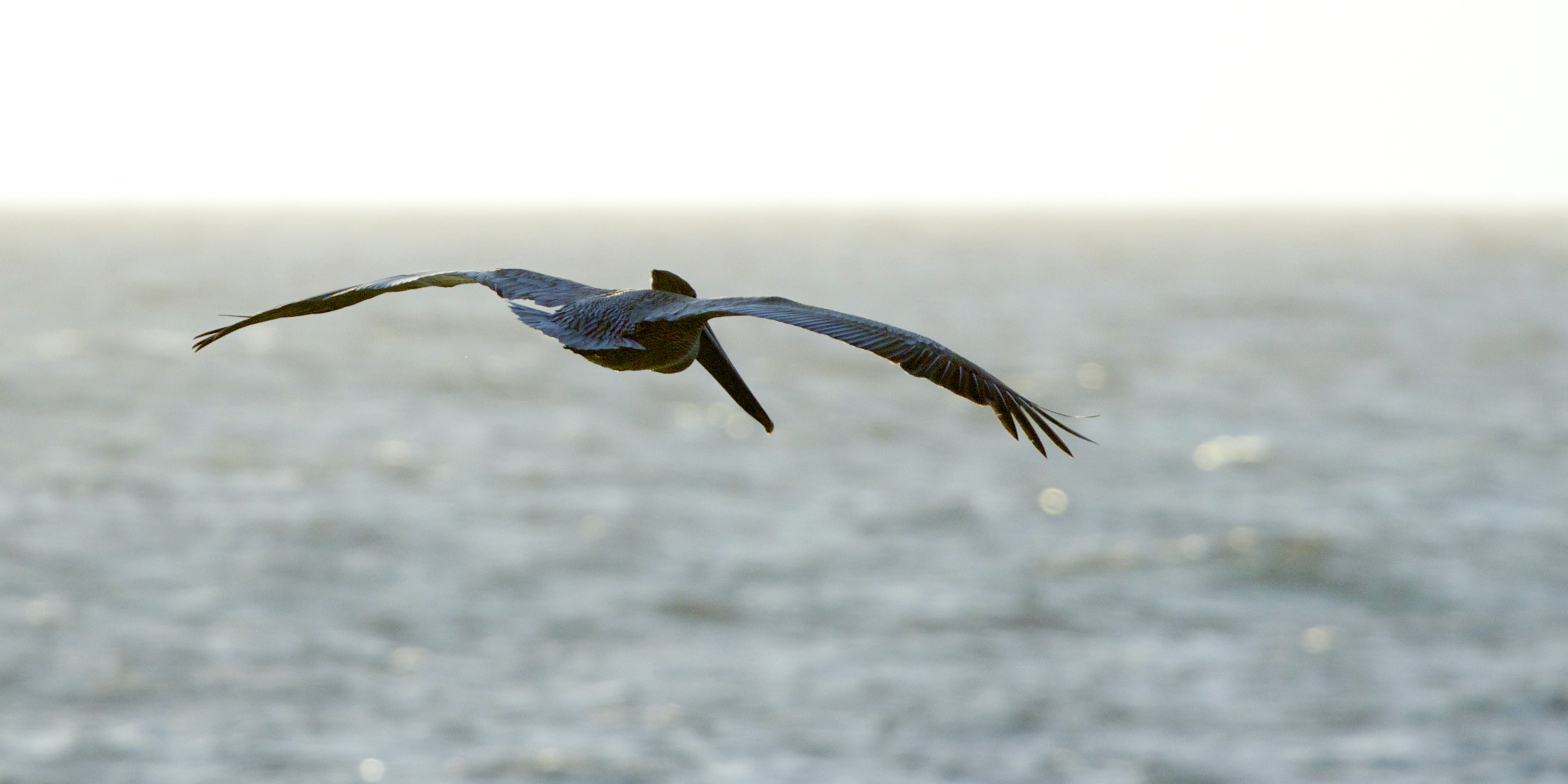
Brown pelican, Nicholls Town.

Order: Pelecaniformes Family: Pelecanidae

Pelicans are large water birds with a distinctive pouch under their beak. As with other members of the order Pelecaniformes, they have webbed feet with four toes.

- American white pelican, Pelecanus erythrorhynchos
- Brown pelican, Pelecanus occidentalis

== Herons, egrets, and bitterns ==
Order: Pelecaniformes Family: Ardeidae

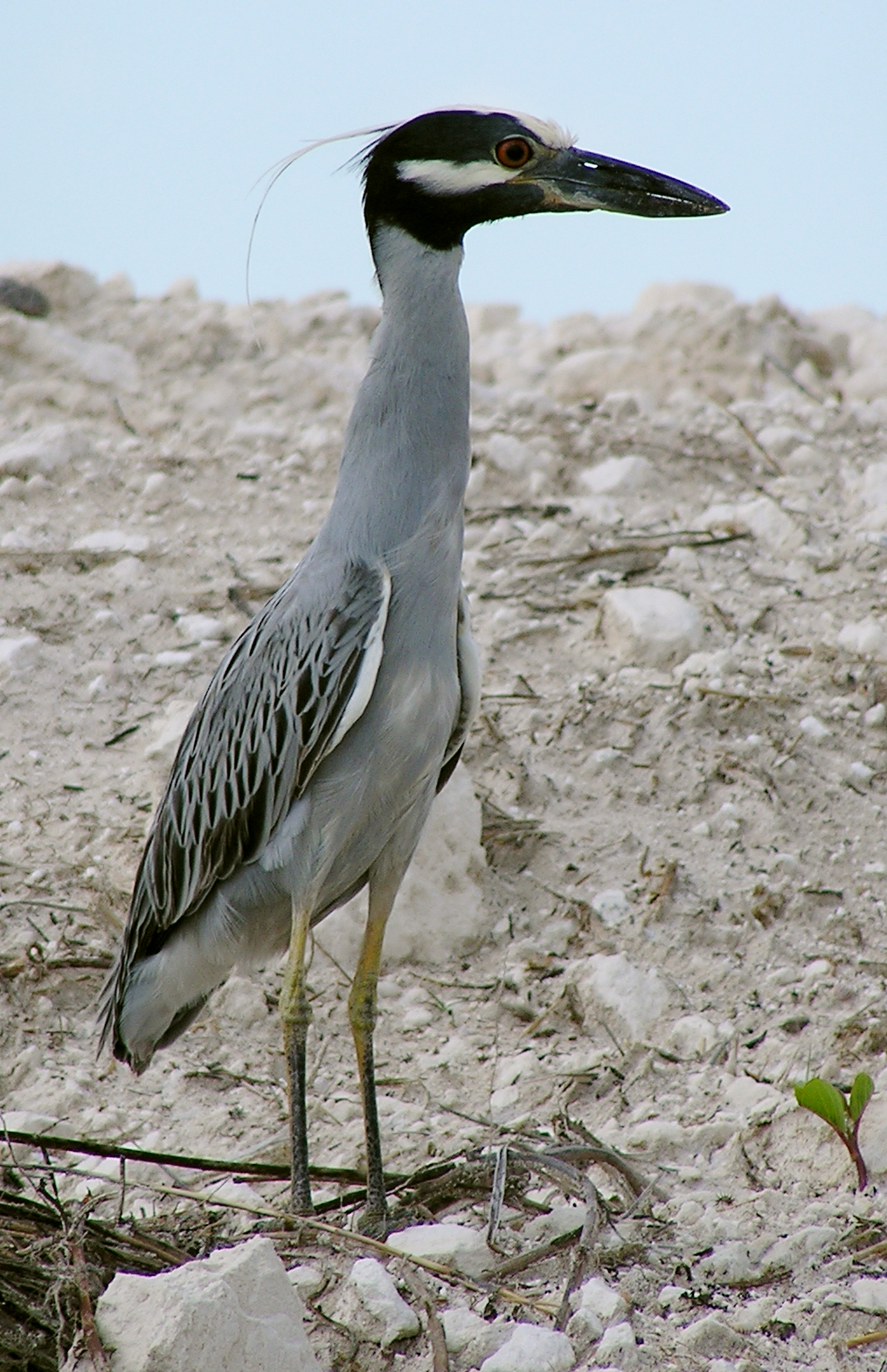
Yellow-crowned night heron, Great Exuma.

The family Ardeidae contains the bitterns, herons, and egrets. Herons and egrets are medium to large wading birds with long necks and legs. Bitterns tend to be shorter necked and more wary. Members of Ardeidae fly with their necks retracted, unlike other long-necked birds such as storks, ibises, and spoonbills.

- American bittern, Botaurus lentiginosus
- Least bittern, Ixobrychus exilis
- Great blue heron, Ardea herodias
- Great egret, Ardea alba
- Snowy egret, Egretta thula
- Little blue heron, Egretta caerulea
- Tricolored heron, Egretta tricolor
- Reddish egret, Egretta rufescens
- Cattle egret, Bubulcus ibis
- Green heron, Butorides virescens
- Black-crowned night heron, Nycticorax nycticorax
- Yellow-crowned night heron, Nyctanassa violacea

== Ibises and spoonbills ==
Order: Pelecaniformes Family: Threskiornithidae

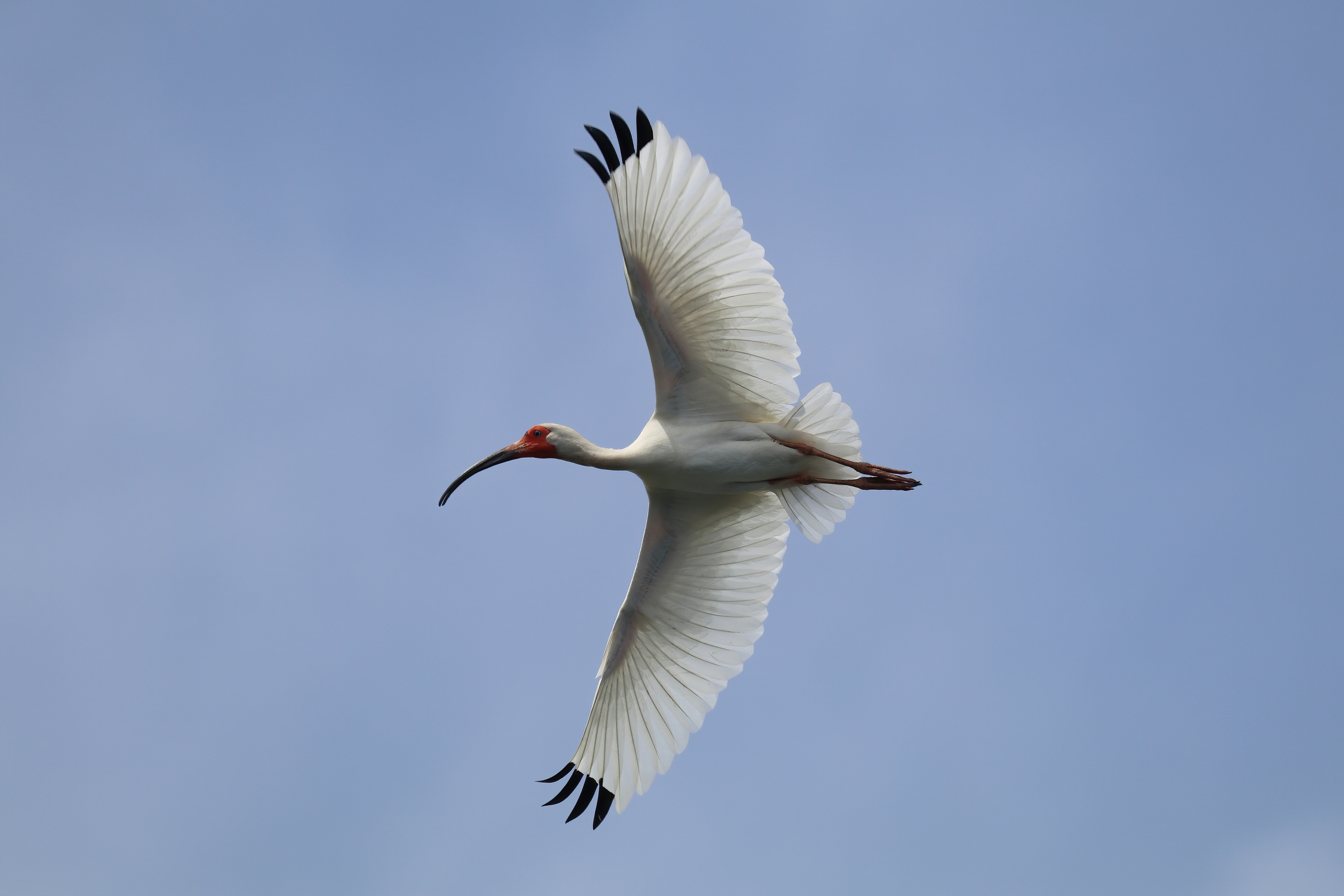
White ibis

Threskiornithidae is a family of large terrestrial and wading birds which includes the ibises and spoonbills. They have long, broad wings with 11 primary and about 20 secondary feathers. They are strong fliers and despite their size and weight, very capable soarers.

- American white ibis, Eudocimus albus
- Scarlet ibis, Eudocimus ruber (uncertain origin)
- Glossy ibis, Plegadis falcinellus
- White-faced ibis, Plegadis chihi (A)
- Roseate spoonbill, Platalea ajaja

== New World vultures ==
Order: Cathartiformes Family: Cathartidae

The New World vultures are not closely related to Old World vultures, but superficially resemble them because of convergent evolution. Like the Old World vultures, they are scavengers. However, unlike Old World vultures, which find carcasses by sight, New World vultures have a good sense of smell with which they locate carrion.

- Black vulture, Coragyps atratus
- Turkey vulture, Cathartes aura

== Osprey ==
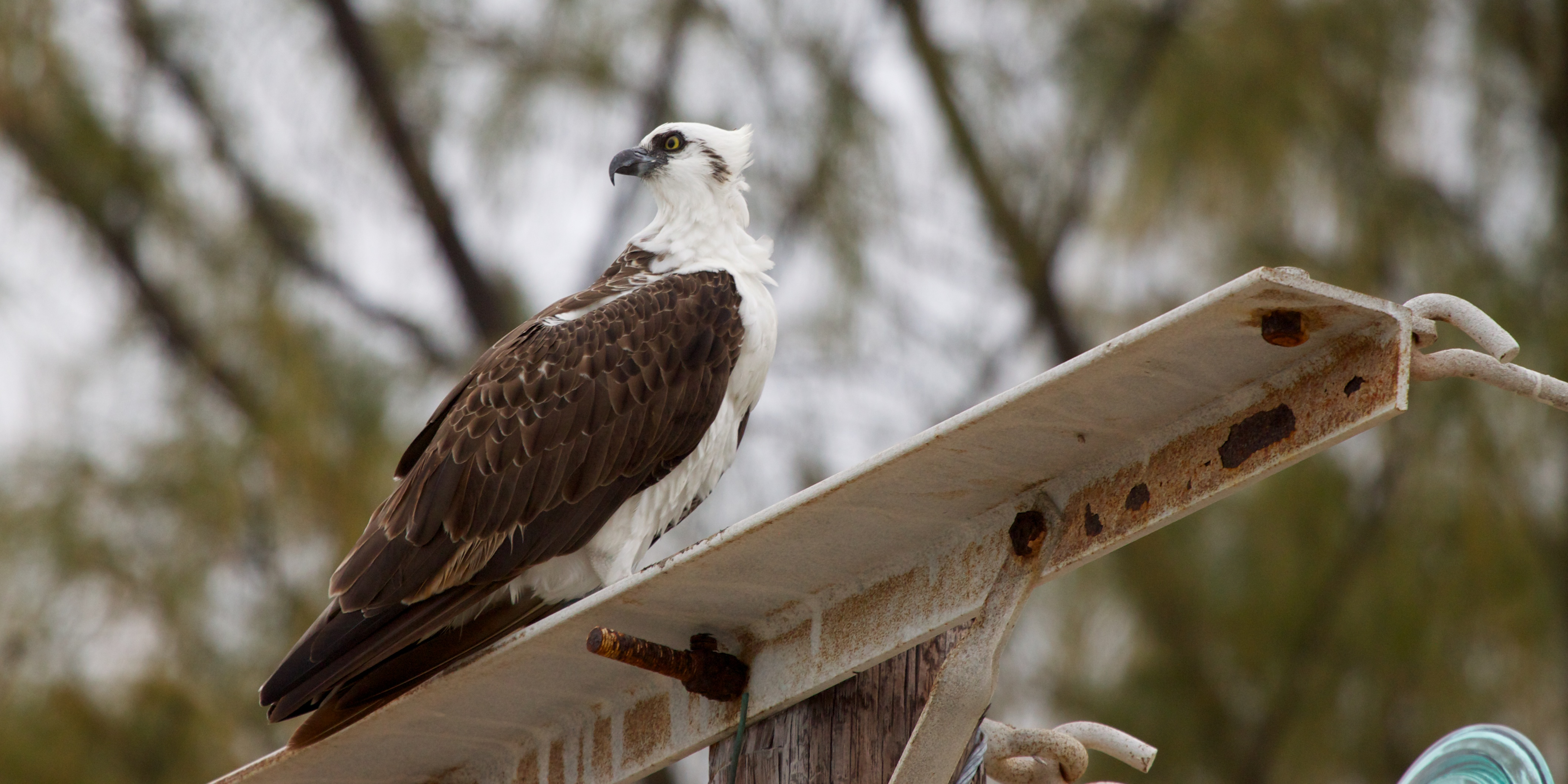
Osprey, Nicholls Town.

Order: Accipitriformes Family: Pandionidae

The family Pandionidae contains only one species, the osprey. The osprey is a medium-large raptor which is a specialist fish-eater with a worldwide distribution.

- Osprey, Pandion haliaetus

== Hawks, eagles, and kites ==
Order: Accipitriformes Family: Accipitridae Accipitridae is a family of birds of prey, which includes hawks, eagles, kites, harriers, and Old World vultures. These birds have powerful hooked beaks for tearing flesh from their prey, strong legs, powerful talons, and keen eyesight.

- Swallow-tailed kite, Elanoides forficatus
- Northern harrier, Circus hudsonius
- Sharp-shinned hawk, Accipiter striatus
- Black kite, Milvus migrans (A)
- Bald eagle, Haliaeetus leucocephalus (A)
- Swainson's hawk, Buteo swainsoni (A)
- Red-tailed hawk, Buteo jamaicensis

== Barn owls ==
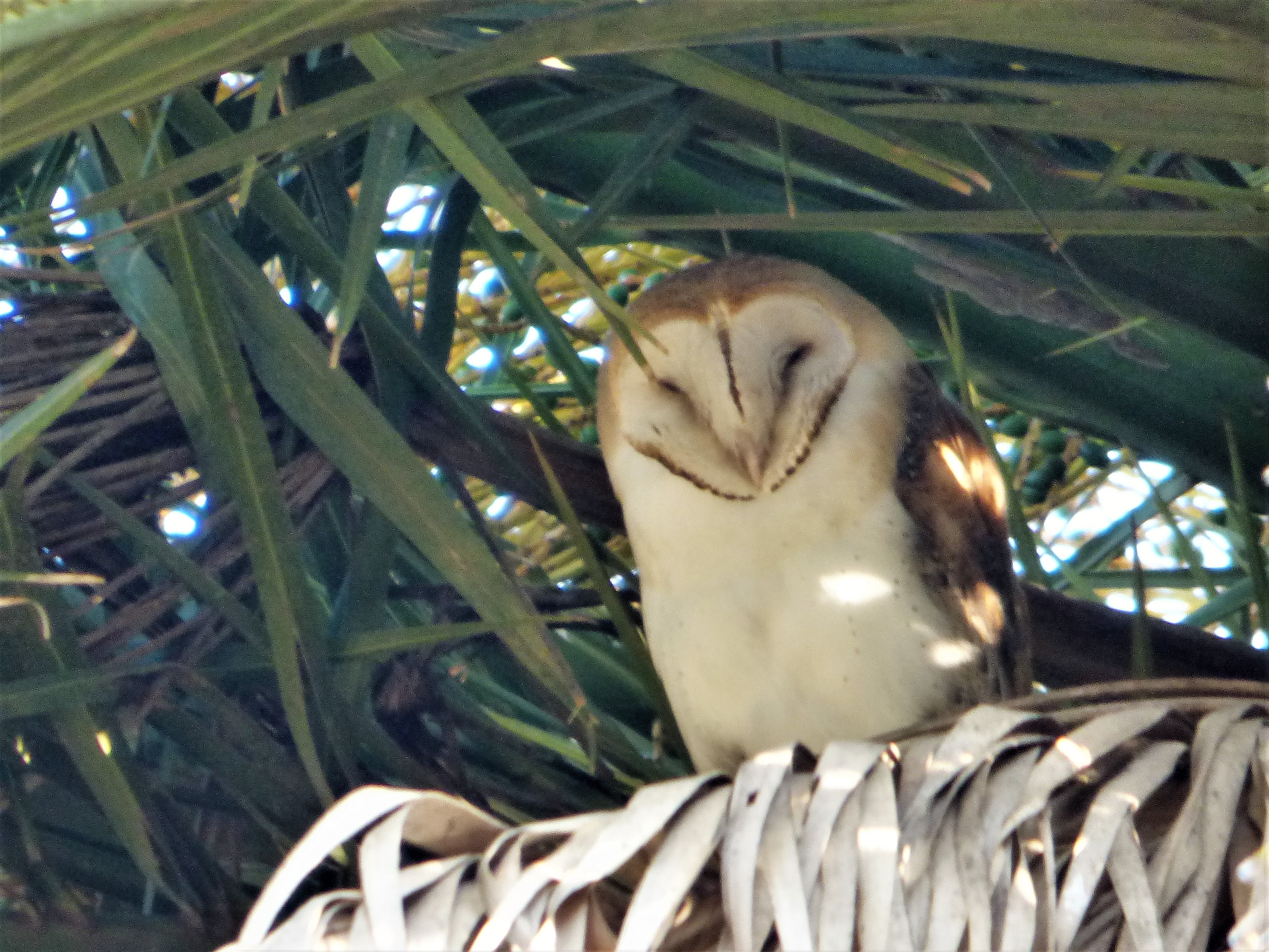
American barn owl

Order: Strigiformes Family: Tytonidae

Barn owls are medium to large owls with large heads and characteristic heart-shaped faces. They have long strong legs with powerful talons.

- American barn owl, Tyto furcata
- Bahamian giant barn owl, Tyto pollens (Ex)

== Owls ==
Order: Strigiformes Family: Strigidae

The typical owls are small to large solitary nocturnal birds of prey. They have large forward-facing eyes and ears, a hawk-like beak, and a conspicuous circle of feathers around each eye called a facial disk.

- Burrowing owl, Athene cunicularia
- Short-eared owl, Asio flammeus
- Northern saw-whet owl, Aegolius acadicus (A)

== Kingfishers ==
Order: Coraciiformes Family: Alcedinidae

Kingfishers are medium-sized birds with large heads, long, pointed bills, short legs, and stubby tails.

- Belted kingfisher, Megaceryle alcyon

== Woodpeckers ==
Order: Piciformes Family: Picidae

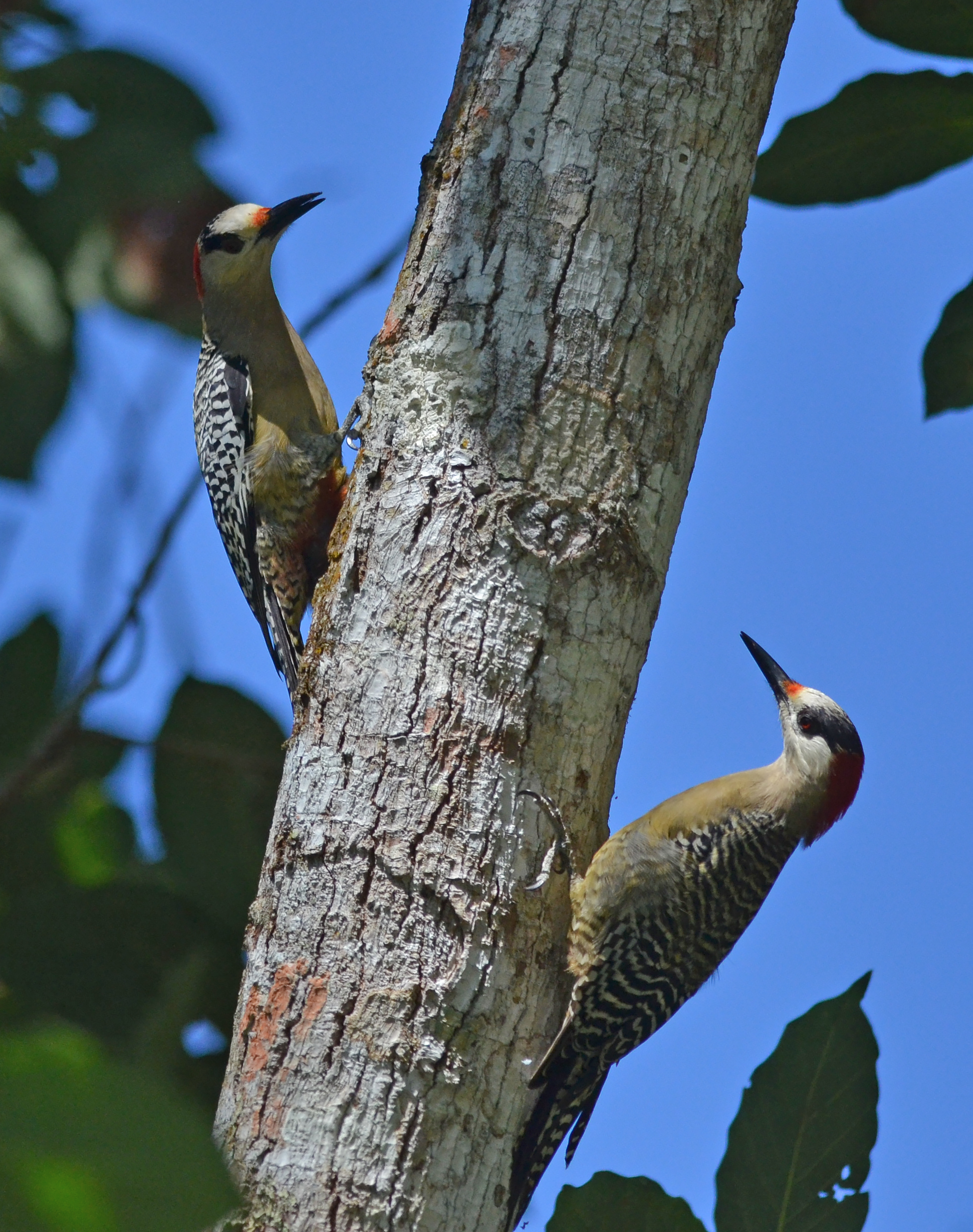
West Indian woodpecker

Woodpeckers are small to medium-sized birds with chisel-like beaks, short legs, stiff tails, and long tongues used for capturing insects. Some species have feet with two toes pointing forward and two backward, while several species have only three toes. Many woodpeckers have the habit of tapping noisily on tree trunks with their beaks.

- West Indian woodpecker, Melanerpes superciliaris
- Yellow-bellied sapsucker, Sphyrapicus varius
- Hairy woodpecker, Dryobates villosus
- Northern flicker, Colaptes auratus (A)
- Fernandina's flicker, Colaptes fernandinae (A)

== Falcons and caracaras ==
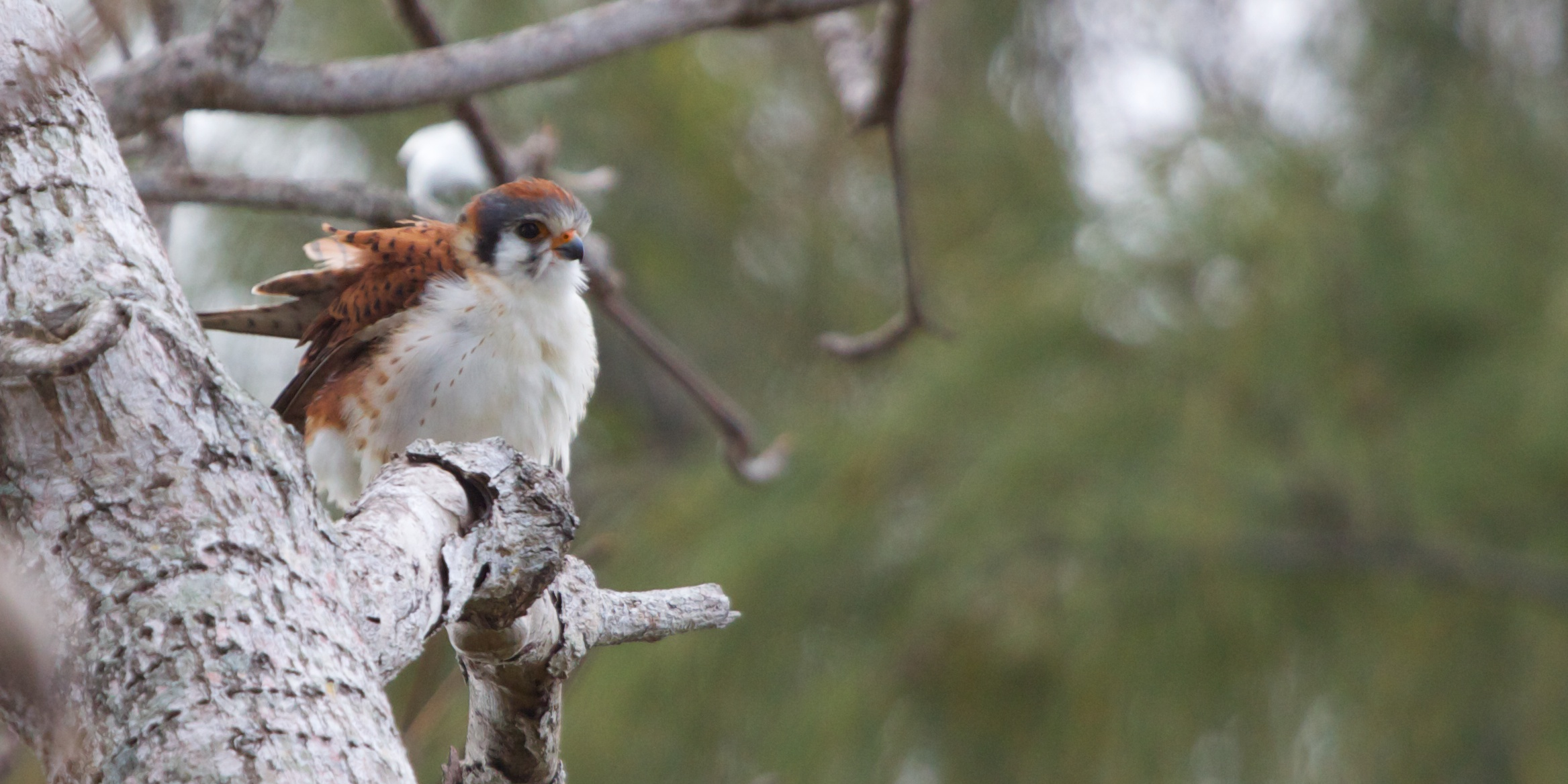
American kestrel, endemic Bahamas subspecies Falco sparverius sparveroides, Nicholls Town.

Order: Falconiformes Family: Falconidae

Falconidae is a family of diurnal birds of prey. They differ from hawks, eagles, and kites in that they kill with their beaks instead of their talons.

- American kestrel, Falco sparverius
- Merlin, Falco columbarius
- Peregrine falcon, Falco peregrinus

== Cockatoos ==
Order: Psittaciformes Family: Cacatuidae

The cockatoos share many features with other parrots including the characteristic curved beak shape and a zygodactyl foot, with two forward toes and two backwards toes. They differ, however in a number of characteristics, including the often spectacular movable headcrest.

- Sulphur-crested cockatoo, Cacatua galerita (I)

== New World and African parrots ==
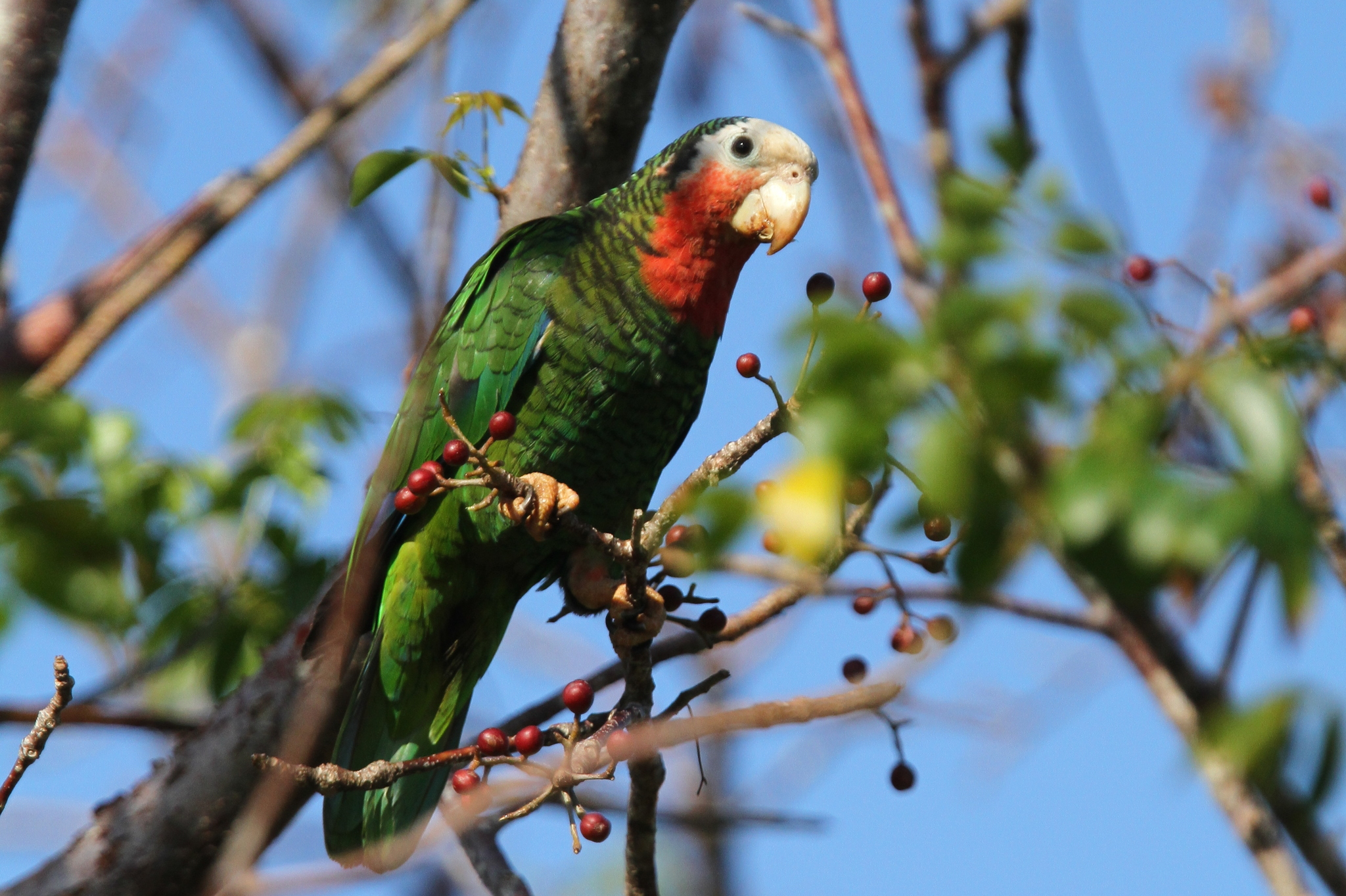
Cuban parrot, Bahamas endemic subspecies Amazona leucocephala bahamensis, Hope Town, Great Abaco.

Order: Psittaciformes Family: Psittacidae

Parrots are small to large birds with a characteristic curved beak. Their upper mandibles have slight mobility in the joint with the skull and they have a generally erect stance. All parrots are zygodactyl, having the four toes on each foot placed two at the front and two to the back.

- Monk parakeet, Myiopsitta monachus (I)
- Blue-and-yellow macaw, Ara ararauna (I)
- White-winged parakeet, Brotogeris versicolurus (A)
- Yellow-chevroned parakeet, Brotogeris chiriri (A)
- Cuban parrot, Amazona leucocephala

== Old World parrots ==
Order: Psittaciformes Family: Psittaculidae

Characteristic features of parrots include a strong curved bill, an upright stance, strong legs, and clawed zygodactyl feet. Many parrots are vividly coloured, and some are multicoloured. Old World parrots are found from Africa east across south and southeast Asia and Oceania to Australia and New Zealand.

- Rosy-faced lovebird, Agapornis roseicollis (I)

== Tyrant flycatchers ==
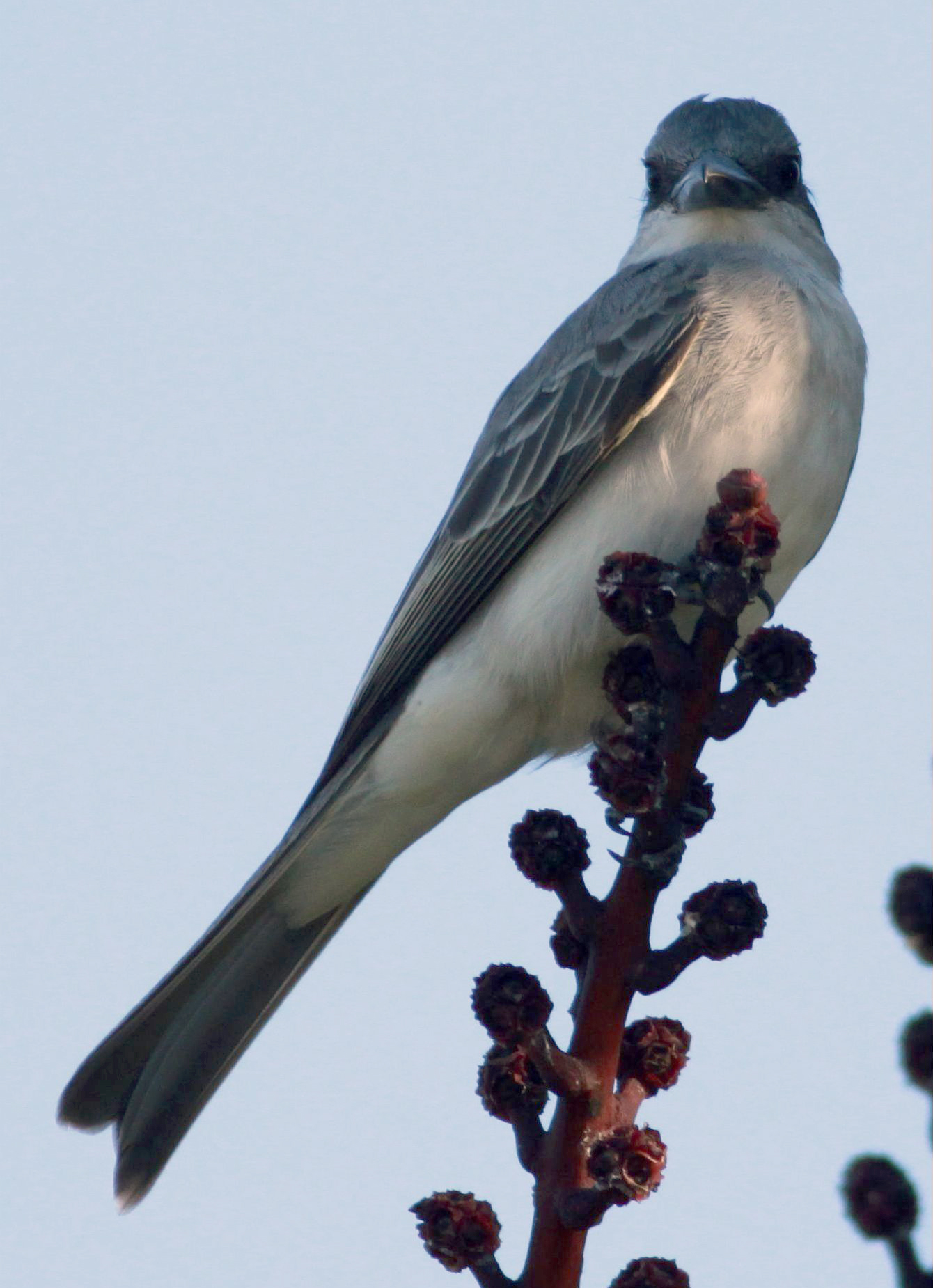
Grey kingbird

Order: Passeriformes Family: Tyrannidae

Tyrant flycatchers are passerine birds which occur throughout North and South America. They superficially resemble the Old World flycatchers, but are more robust and have stronger bills. They do not have the sophisticated vocal capabilities of the songbirds. Most, but not all, have plain colouring. As the name implies, most are insectivorous.

- Ash-throated flycatcher, Myiarchus cinerascens (A)
- Great crested flycatcher, Myiarchus crinitus
- Brown-crested flycatcher, Myiarchus tyrannulus (A)
- La Sagra's flycatcher, Myiarchus sagrae
- Stolid flycatcher, Myiarchus stolidus
- Western kingbird, Tyrannus verticalis (A)
- Eastern kingbird, Tyrannus tyrannus
- Grey kingbird, Tyrannus dominicensis
- Loggerhead kingbird, Tyrannus caudifasciatus
- Giant kingbird, Tyrannus cubensis (Er)
- Scissor-tailed flycatcher, Tyrannus forficatus
- Fork-tailed flycatcher, Tyrannus savana (A)
- Olive-sided flycatcher, Contopus cooperi (A)
- Eastern wood pewee, Contopus virens (A)
- Cuban pewee, Contopus caribaeus
- Hispaniolan pewee, Contopus hispaniolensis (A)
- Acadian flycatcher, Empidonax virescens (A)
- Alder flycatcher, Empidonax alnorum (A)
- Willow flycatcher, Empidonax traillii (A)
- Least flycatcher, Empidonax minimus (A)
- Eastern phoebe, Sayornis phoebe (A)

== Vireos, shrike-babblers, and erpornis ==
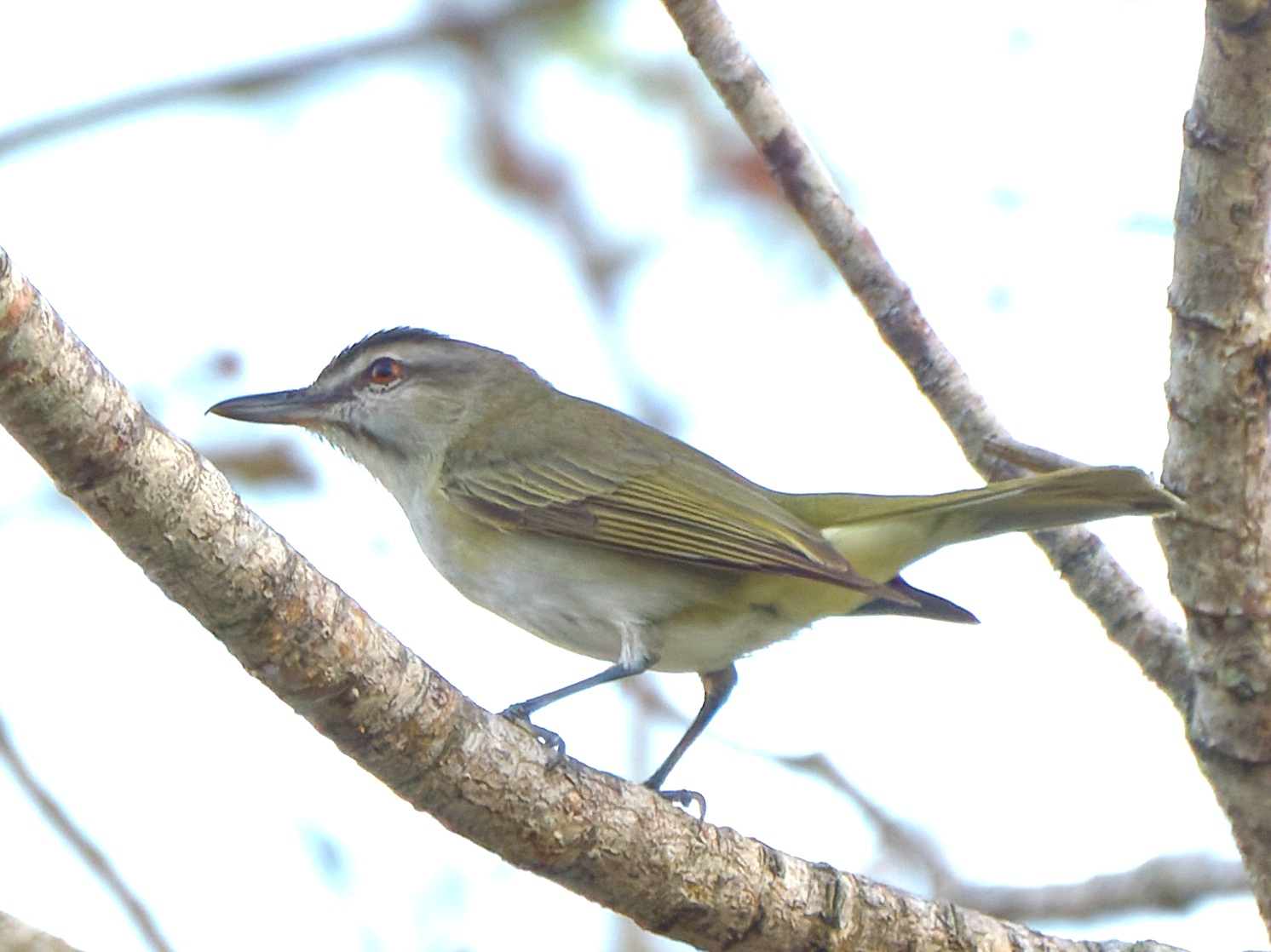
Black whiskered vireo

Order: Passeriformes Family: Vireonidae

The vireos are a group of small to medium-sized passerine birds. They are typically greenish in colour and resemble New World warblers apart from their heavier bills.

- White-eyed vireo, Vireo griseus (A)
- Thick-billed vireo, Vireo crassirostris
- Bell's vireo, Vireo bellii (A)
- Yellow-throated vireo, Vireo flavifrons (A)
- Blue-headed vireo, Vireo solitarius (A)
- Philadelphia vireo, Vireo philadelphicus (A)
- Warbling vireo, Vireo gilvus (A)
- Red-eyed vireo, Vireo olivaceus
- Black-whiskered vireo, Vireo altiloquus

== Shrikes ==
Order: Passeriformes Family: Laniidae

Shrikes are passerine birds known for their habit of catching other birds and small animals and impaling the uneaten portions of their bodies on thorns. A shrike's beak is hooked, like that of a typical bird of prey.

- Loggerhead shrike, Lanius ludovicianus

== Crows, jays, and magpies ==
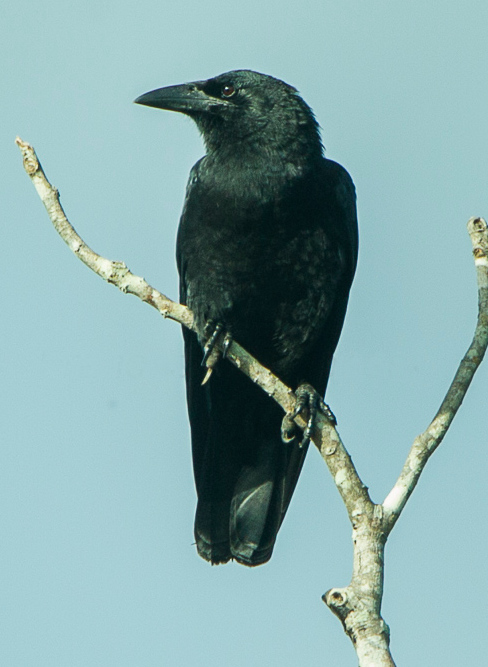
Cuban crow

Order: Passeriformes Family: Corvidae

The family Corvidae includes crows, ravens, jays, choughs, magpies, treepies, nutcrackers, and ground jays. Corvids are above average in size among the Passeriformes, and some of the larger species show high levels of intelligence.

- American crow, Corvus brachyrhynchos (A)
- Cuban crow, Corvus nasicus
- Fish crow, Corvus ossifragus

== Larks ==
Order: Passeriformes Family: Alaudidae

Larks are small terrestrial birds with often extravagant songs and display flights. Most larks are fairly dull in appearance. Their food is insects and seeds.

- Horned lark, Eremophila alpestris (A)

== Swallows ==
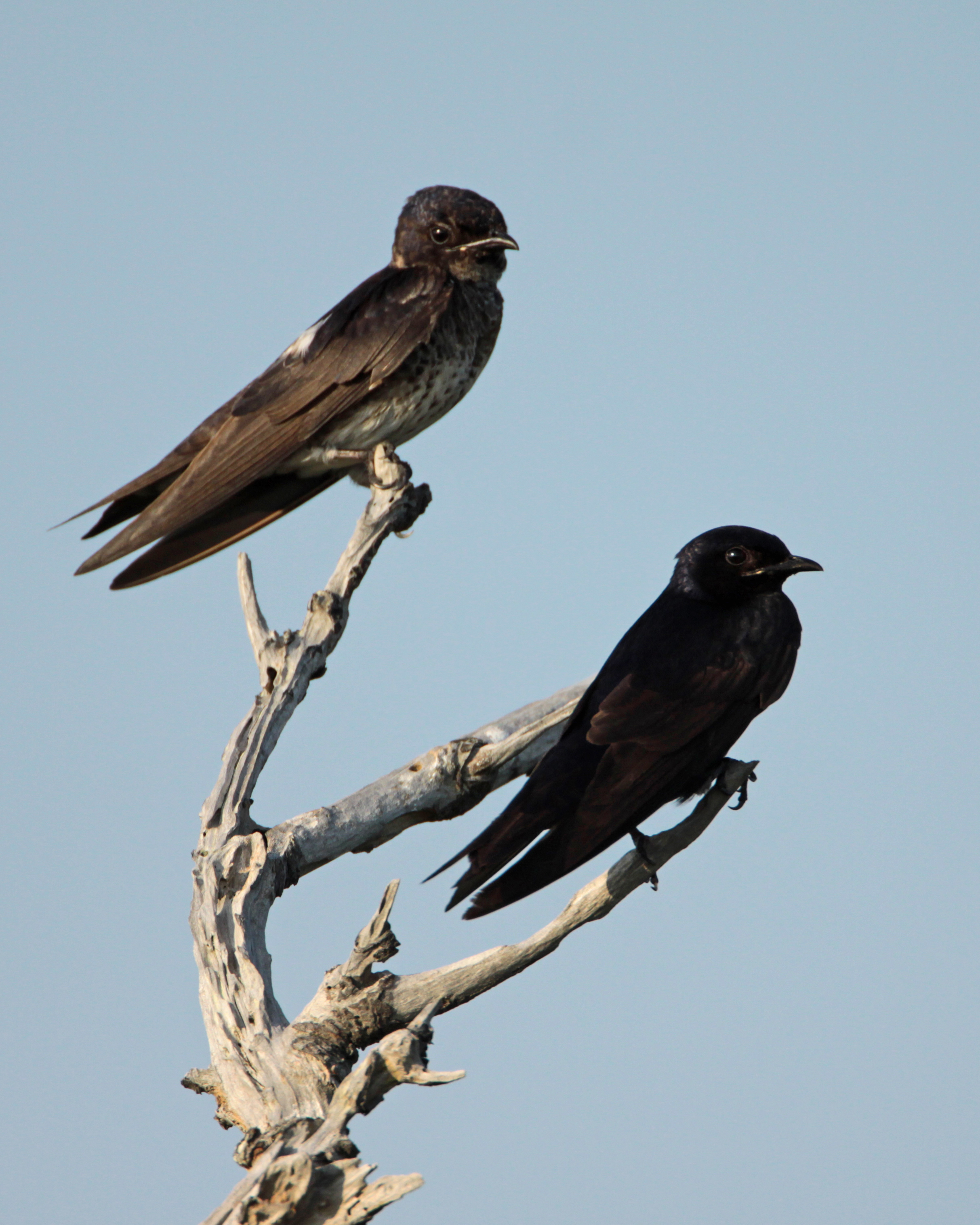
Purple martin

Order: Passeriformes Family: Hirundinidae

The family Hirundinidae is adapted to aerial feeding. They have a slender streamlined body, long pointed wings, and a short bill with a wide gape. The feet are adapted to perching rather than walking, and the front toes are partially joined at the base.

- Sand martin, Riparia riparia
- Tree swallow, Tachycineta bicolor
- Bahama swallow, Tachycineta cyaneoviridis
- Northern rough-winged swallow, Stelgidopteryx serripennis
- Purple martin, Progne subis
- Cuban martin, Progne cryptoleuca (A)
- Caribbean martin, Progne dominicensis (A)
- Barn swallow, Hirundo rustica
- American cliff swallow, Petrochelidon pyrrhonota
- Cave swallow, Petrochelidon fulva

== Kinglets ==
Order: Passeriformes Family: Regulidae

The kinglets, also called crests, are a small group of birds often included in the Old World warblers, but frequently given family status because they also resemble the titmice.

- Ruby-crowned kinglet, Corthylio calendula (A)

== Waxwings ==
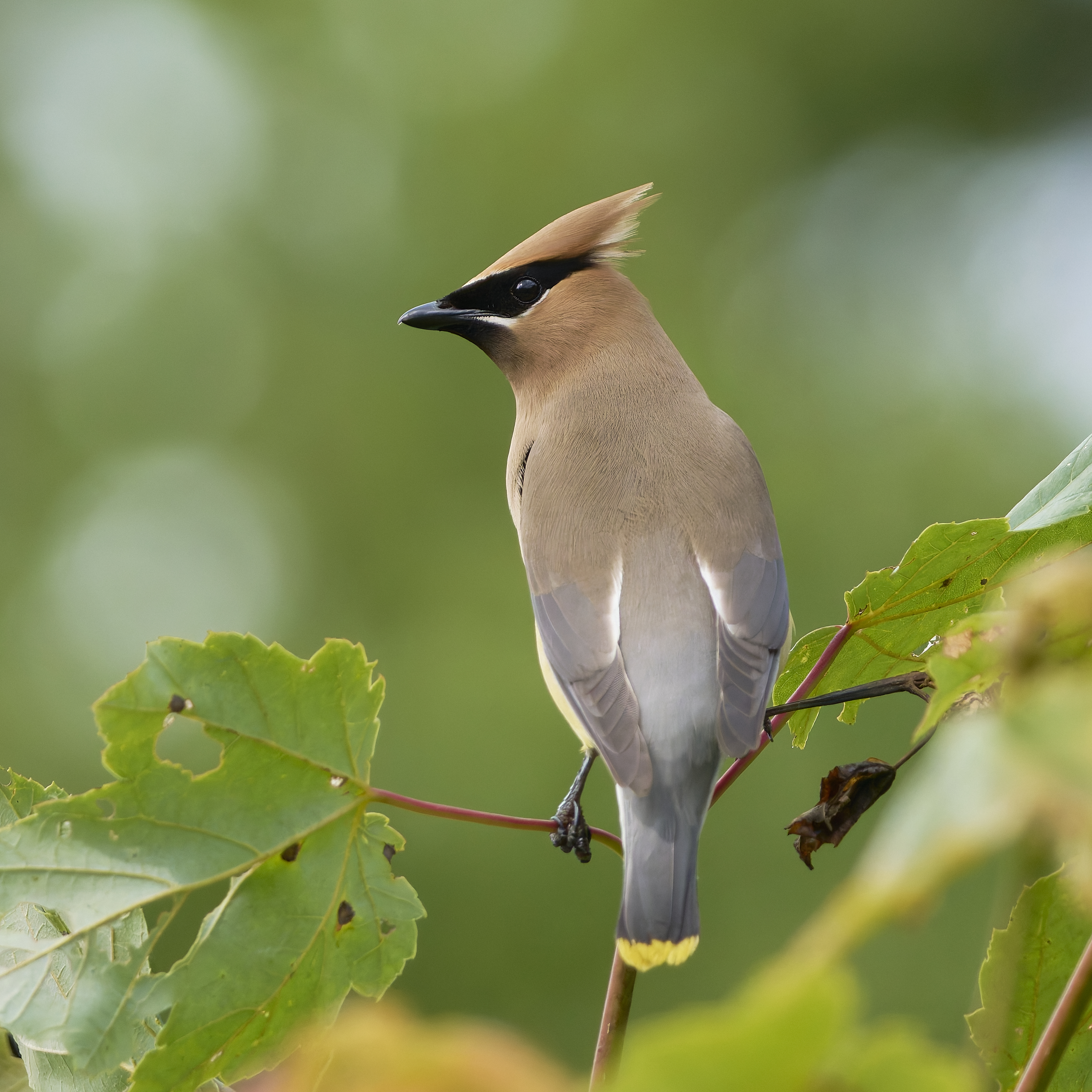
Cedar waxwing

Order: Passeriformes Family: Bombycillidae

The waxwings are a group of birds with soft silky plumage and unique red tips to some of the wing feathers. In the Bohemian and cedar waxwings, these tips look like sealing wax and give the group its name. These are arboreal birds of northern forests. They live on insects in summer and berries in winter.

- Cedar waxwing, Bombycilla cedrorum

== Nuthatches ==
Order: Passeriformes Family: Sittidae

Nuthatches are small woodland birds. They have the unusual ability to climb down trees head first, unlike other birds which can only go upwards. Nuthatches have big heads, short tails, and powerful bills and feet.

- Bahama nuthatch, Sitta insularis (E)

== Gnatcatchers ==
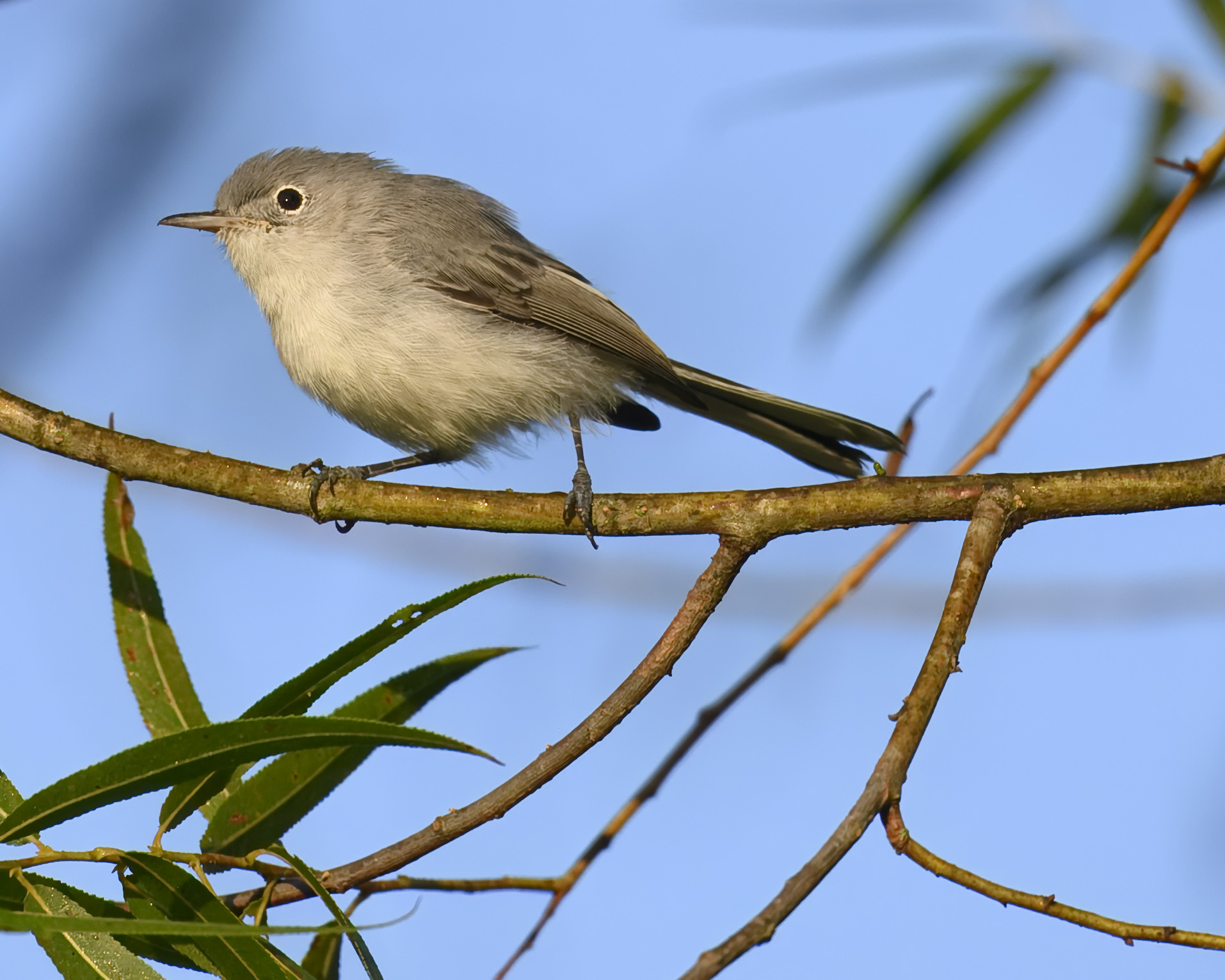
Blue-grey gnatcatcher

Order: Passeriformes Family: Polioptilidae

These dainty birds resemble Old World warblers in their build and habits, moving restlessly through the foliage seeking insects. The gnatcatchers and gnatwrens are mainly soft bluish grey in colour and have the typical insectivore's long sharp bill. They are birds of fairly open woodland or scrub, which nest in bushes or trees.

- Blue-grey gnatcatcher, Polioptila caerulea

== Wrens ==
Order: Passeriformes Family: Troglodytidae

The wrens are mainly small and inconspicuous except for their loud songs. These birds have short wings and thin down-turned bills. Several species often hold their tails upright. All are insectivorous.

- Northern house wren, Troglodytes aedon
- Sedge wren, Cistothorus platensis (A)

== Mockingbirds and thrashers ==
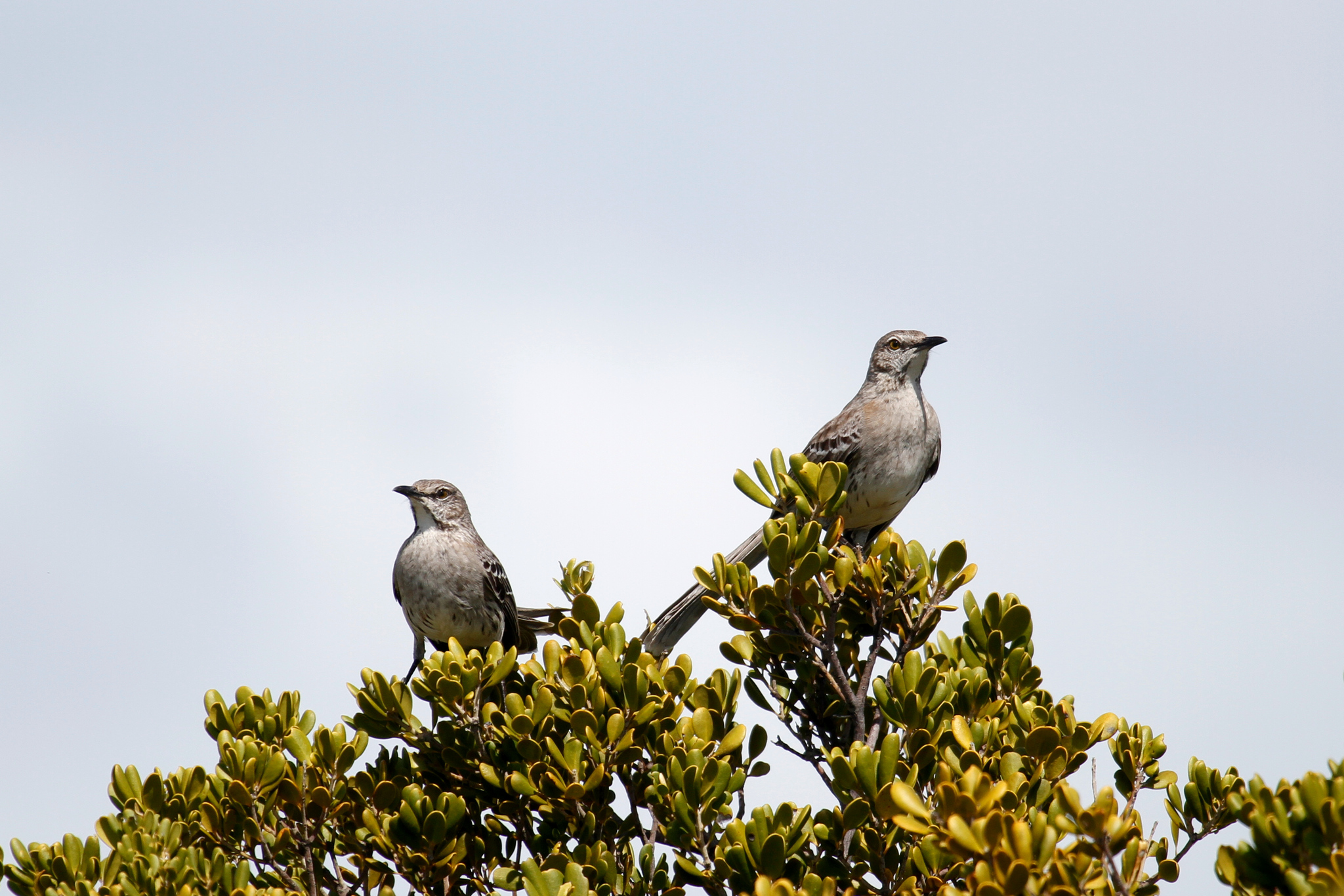
Bahama mockingbird

Order: Passeriformes Family: Mimidae

The mimids are a family of passerine birds that includes thrashers, mockingbirds, tremblers, and the New World catbirds. These birds are notable for their vocalizations, especially their ability to mimic a wide variety of birds and other sounds heard outdoors. Their colouring tends towards dull-greys and browns .

- Grey catbird, Dumetella carolinensis
- Pearly-eyed thrasher, Margarops fuscatus
- Brown thrasher, Toxostoma rufum
- Bahama mockingbird, Mimus gundlachii
- Northern mockingbird, Mimus polyglottos

== Starlings ==
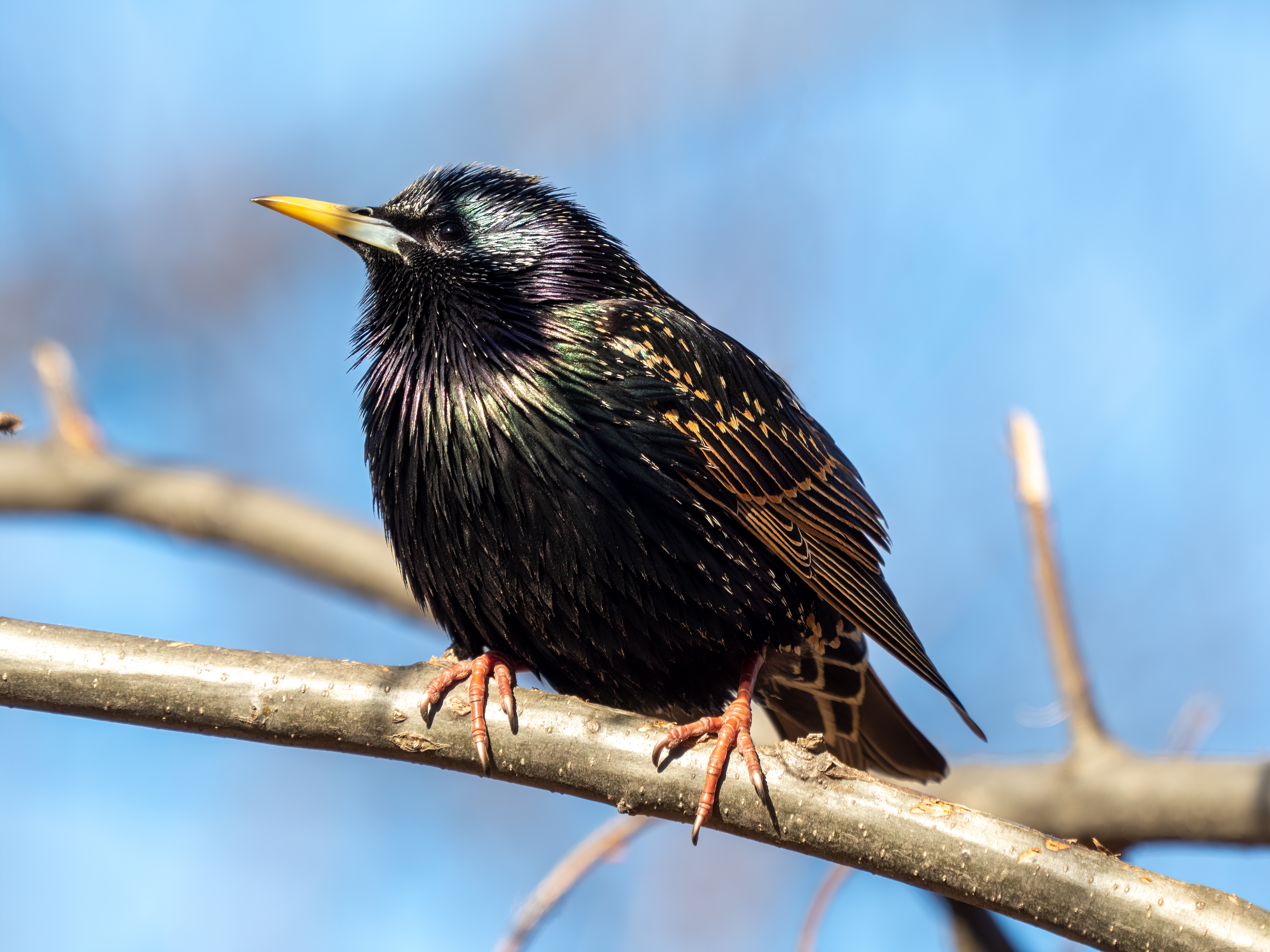
Common starling

Order: Passeriformes Family: Sturnidae

Starlings are small to medium-sized passerine birds. Their flight is strong and direct and they are very gregarious. Their preferred habitat is fairly open country. They eat insects and fruit. Plumage is typically dark with a metallic sheen.

- Common starling, Sturnus vulgaris (I)
- Common myna, Acridotheres tristis (I)

== Thrushes and allies ==
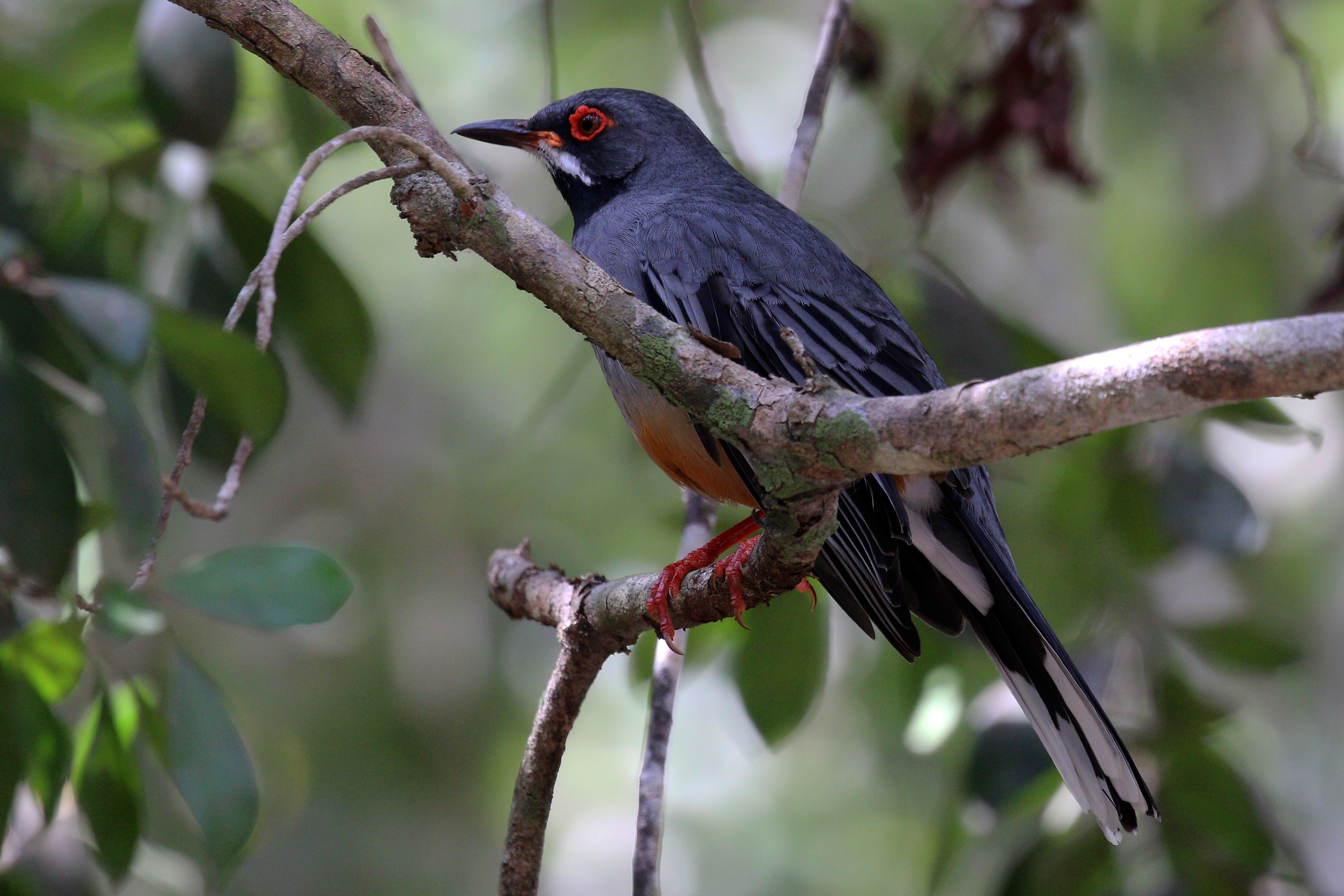
Western red legged thrush

Order: Passeriformes Family: Turdidae

The thrushes are a group of passerine birds that occur mainly in the Old World. They are plump, soft plumaged, small to medium-sized insectivores or sometimes omnivores, often feeding on the ground. Many have attractive songs.

- Eastern bluebird, Sialia sialis (A)
- Veery, Catharus fuscescens
- Grey-cheeked thrush, Catharus minimus (A)
- Swainson's thrush, Catharus ustulatus (A)
- Hermit thrush, Catharus guttatus (A)
- Wood thrush, Hylocichla mustelina (A)
- American robin, Turdus migratorius
- Western red-legged thrush, Turdus plumbeus

== Old World flycatchers ==
Order: Passeriformes Family: Muscicapidae

Old World flycatchers are a large group of small passerine birds native to the Old World. They are mainly small arboreal insectivores. The appearance of these birds is highly varied, but they mostly have weak songs and harsh calls.

- Northern wheatear, Oenanthe oenanthe (A)

== Waxbills and allies ==
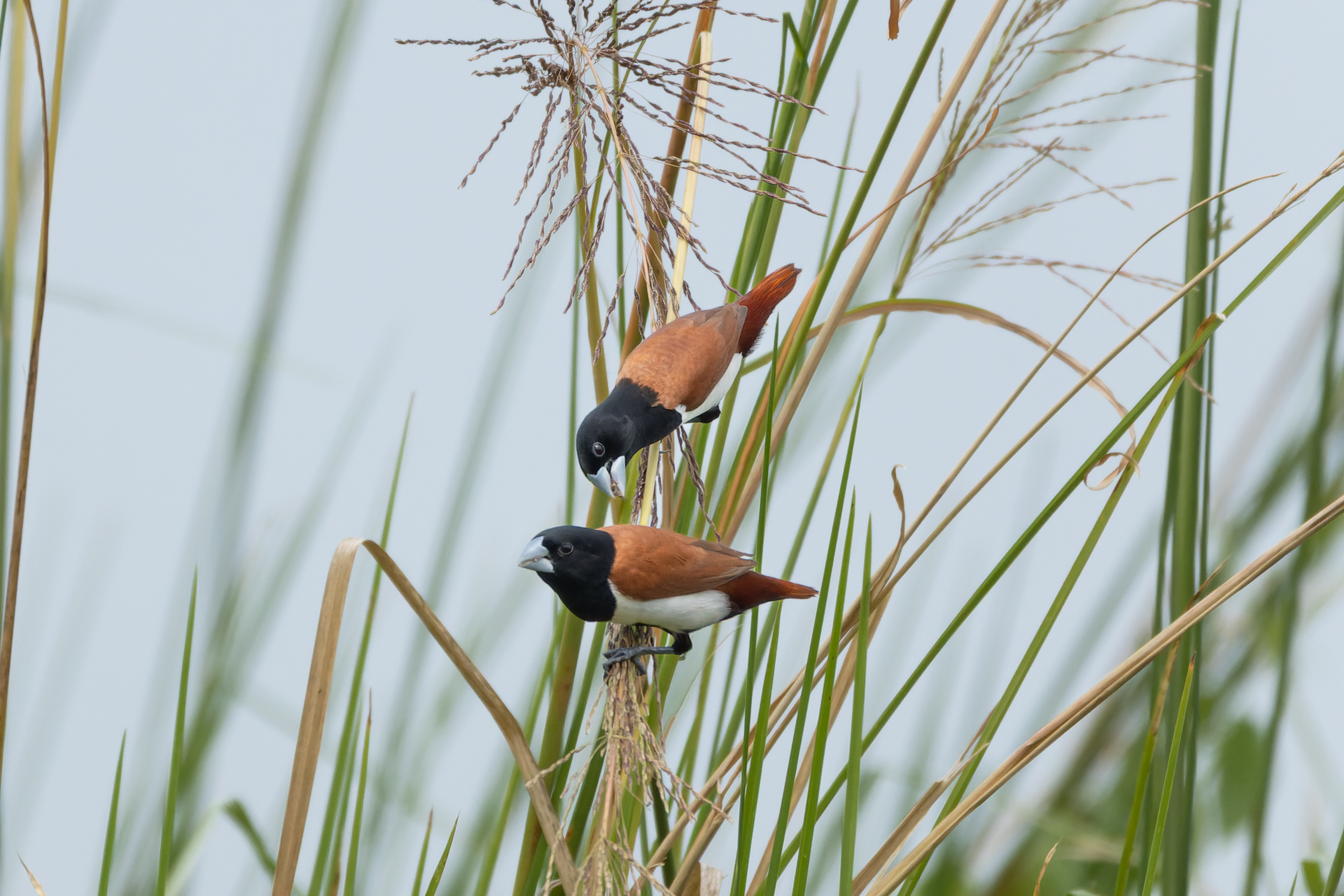
Tricoloured munia

Order: Passeriformes Family: Estrildidae

The estrildid finches are small passerine birds native to the Old World tropics. They are gregarious and often colonial seed eaters with short thick but pointed bills. They are all similar in structure and habits, but have wide variation in plumage colours and patterns.

- Tricoloured munia, Lonchura malacca (I)

== Old World sparrows ==
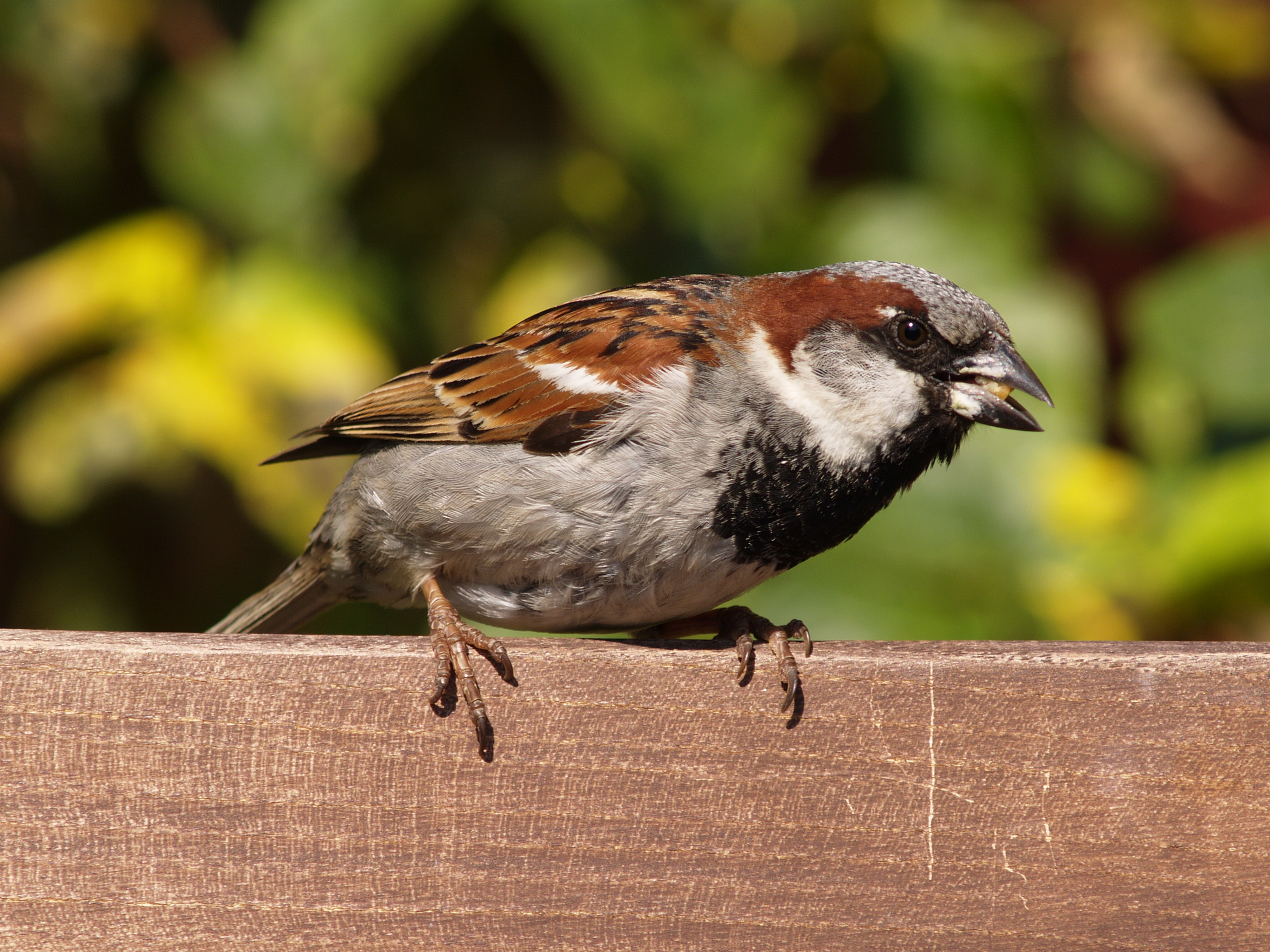
House sparrow

Order: Passeriformes Family: Passeridae

Sparrows are small passerine birds. In general, sparrows tend to be small, plump, brown or grey birds with short tails and short powerful beaks. Sparrows are seed eaters, but they also consume small insects.

- House sparrow, Passer domesticus (I)

== Wagtails and pipits ==
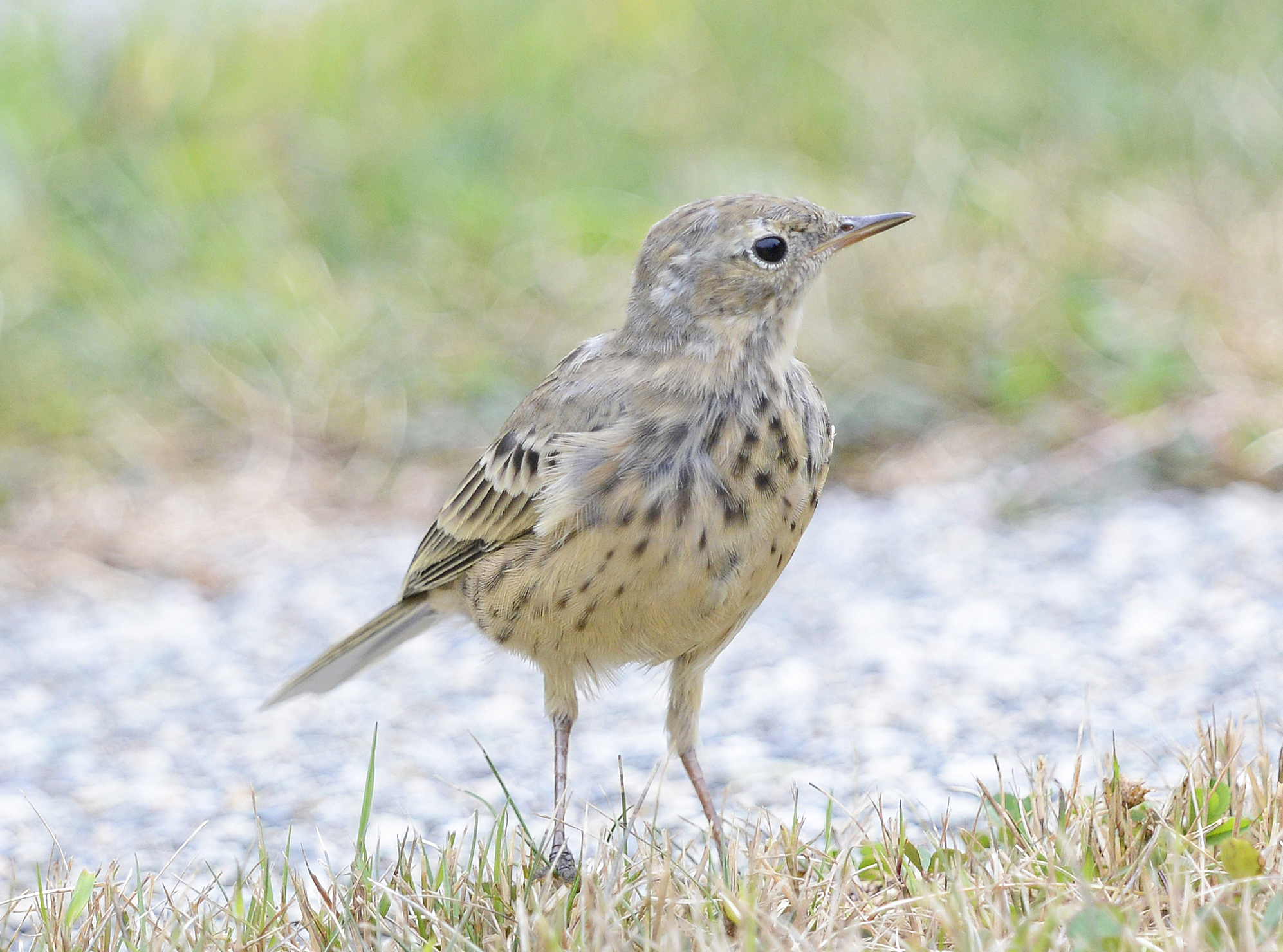
American pipit

Order: Passeriformes Family: Motacillidae

Motacillidae is a family of small passerine birds with medium to long tails. They include the wagtails, longclaws, and pipits. They are slender ground-feeding insectivores of open country.

- American pipit, Anthus rubescens
- Sprague's pipit, Anthus spragueii (A)

== Finches, euphonias, and allies ==
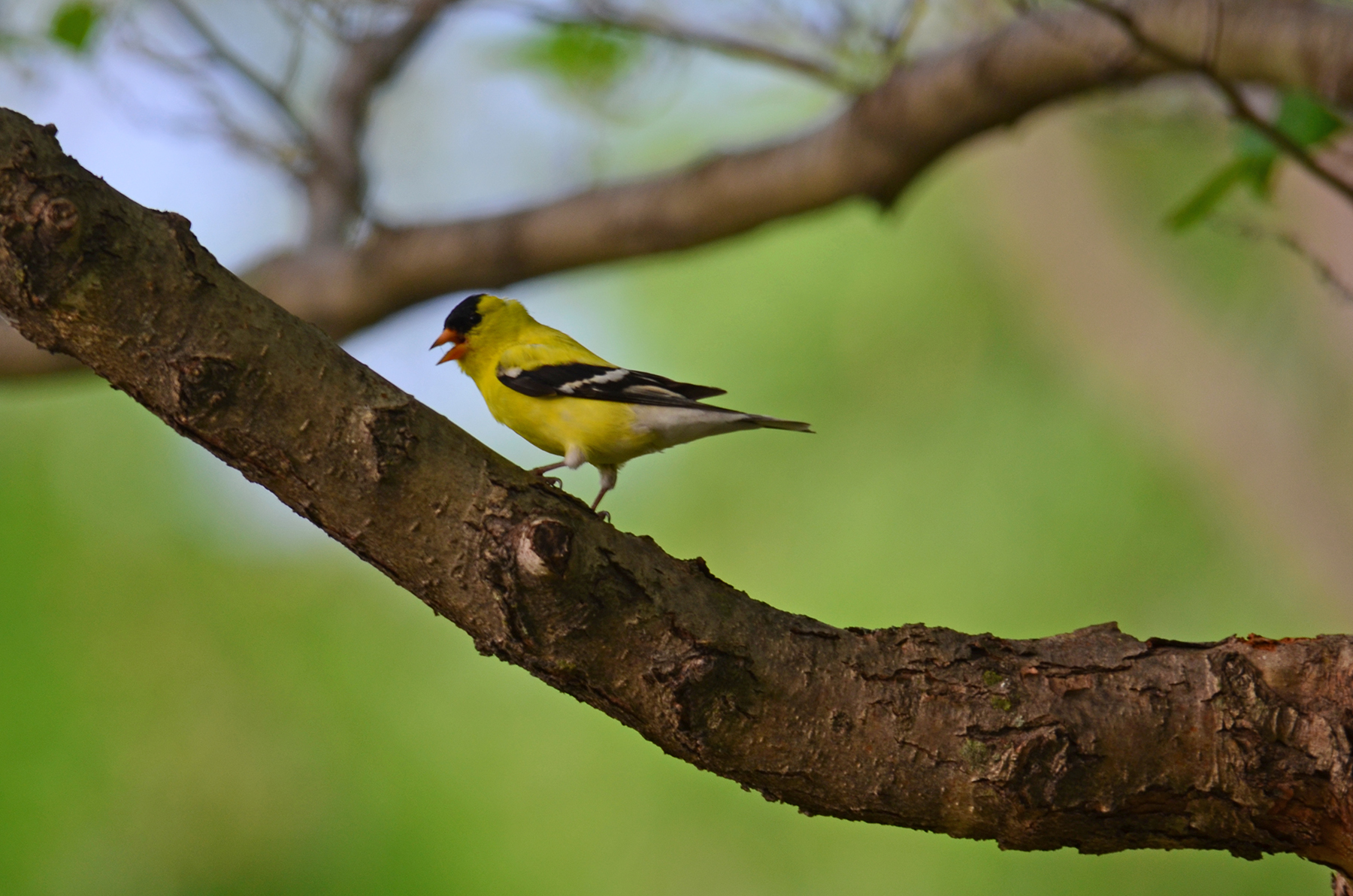
American goldfinch

Order: Passeriformes Family: Fringillidae

Finches are seed-eating passerine birds, that are small to moderately large and have a strong beak, usually conical and in some species very large. All have twelve tail feathers and nine primaries. These birds have a bouncing flight with alternating bouts of flapping and gliding on closed wings, and most sing well.

- American goldfinch, Spinus tristis (A)

== Longspurs and snow buntings ==
Order: Passeriformes Family: Calcariidae

The Calcariidae are a group of passerine birds that were traditionally grouped with the New World sparrows, but differ in a number of respects and are usually found in open grassy areas.

- Lapland longspur, Calcarius lapponicus (A)
- Snow bunting, Plectrophenax nivalis (A)

== New World sparrows ==
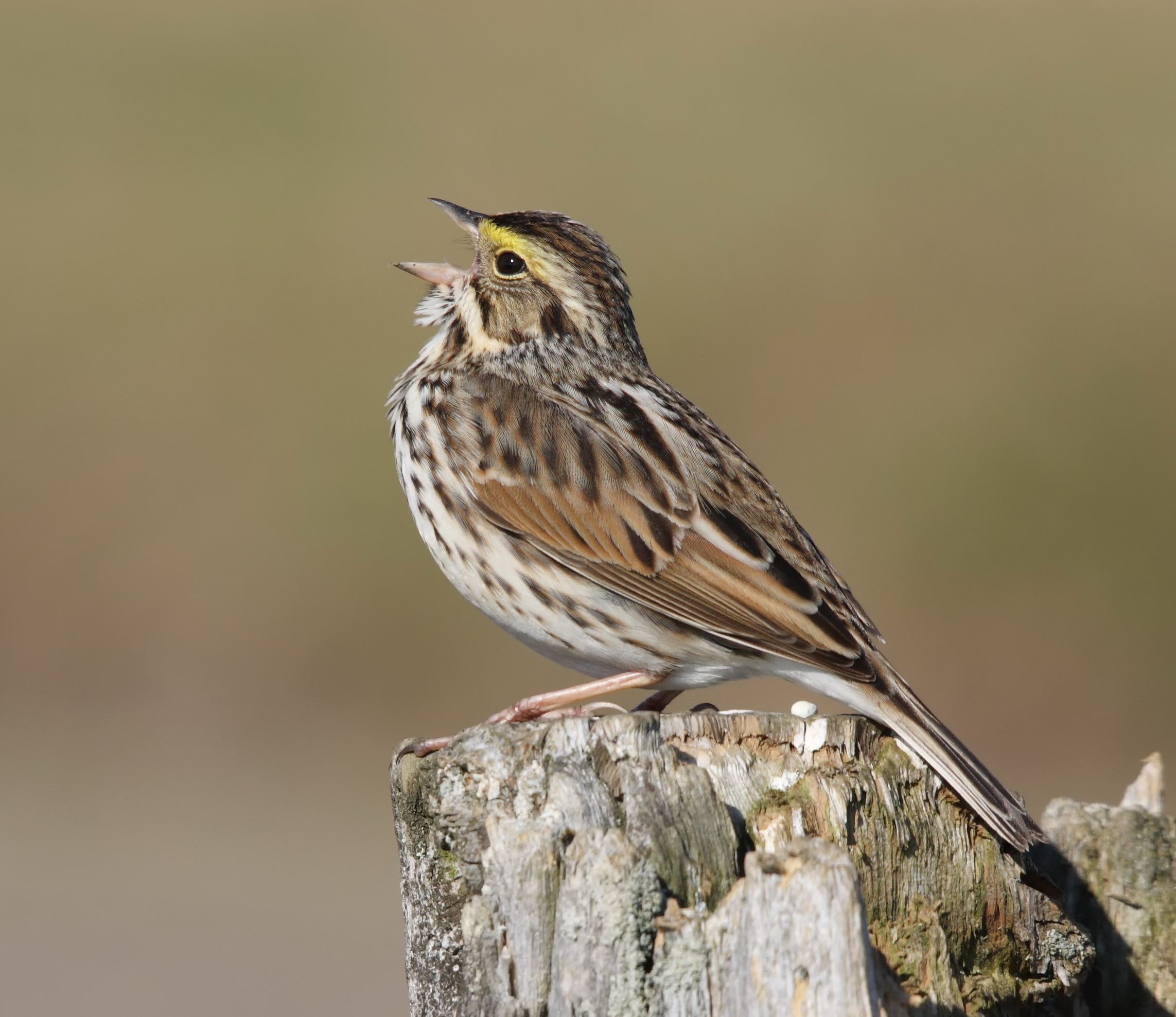
Savannah sparrow

Order: Passeriformes Family: Passerellidae

Until 2017, these species were considered part of the family Emberizidae. Most of the species are known as sparrows, but these birds are not closely related to the Old World sparrows which are in the family Passeridae. Many of these have distinctive head patterns.

- Grasshopper sparrow, Ammodramus savannarum (A)
- Lark sparrow, Chondestes grammacus (A)
- Chipping sparrow, Spizella passerina (A)
- Clay-coloured sparrow, Spizella pallida (A)
- Dark-eyed junco, Junco hyemalis (A)
- White-crowned sparrow, Zonotrichia leucophrys (A)
- White-throated sparrow, Zonotrichia albicollis (A)
- Vesper sparrow, Pooecetes gramineus
- Savannah sparrow, Passerculus sandwichensis
- Song sparrow, Melospiza melodia
- Lincoln's sparrow, Melospiza lincolnii (A)
- Swamp sparrow, Melospiza georgiana (A)

== Spindalises ==
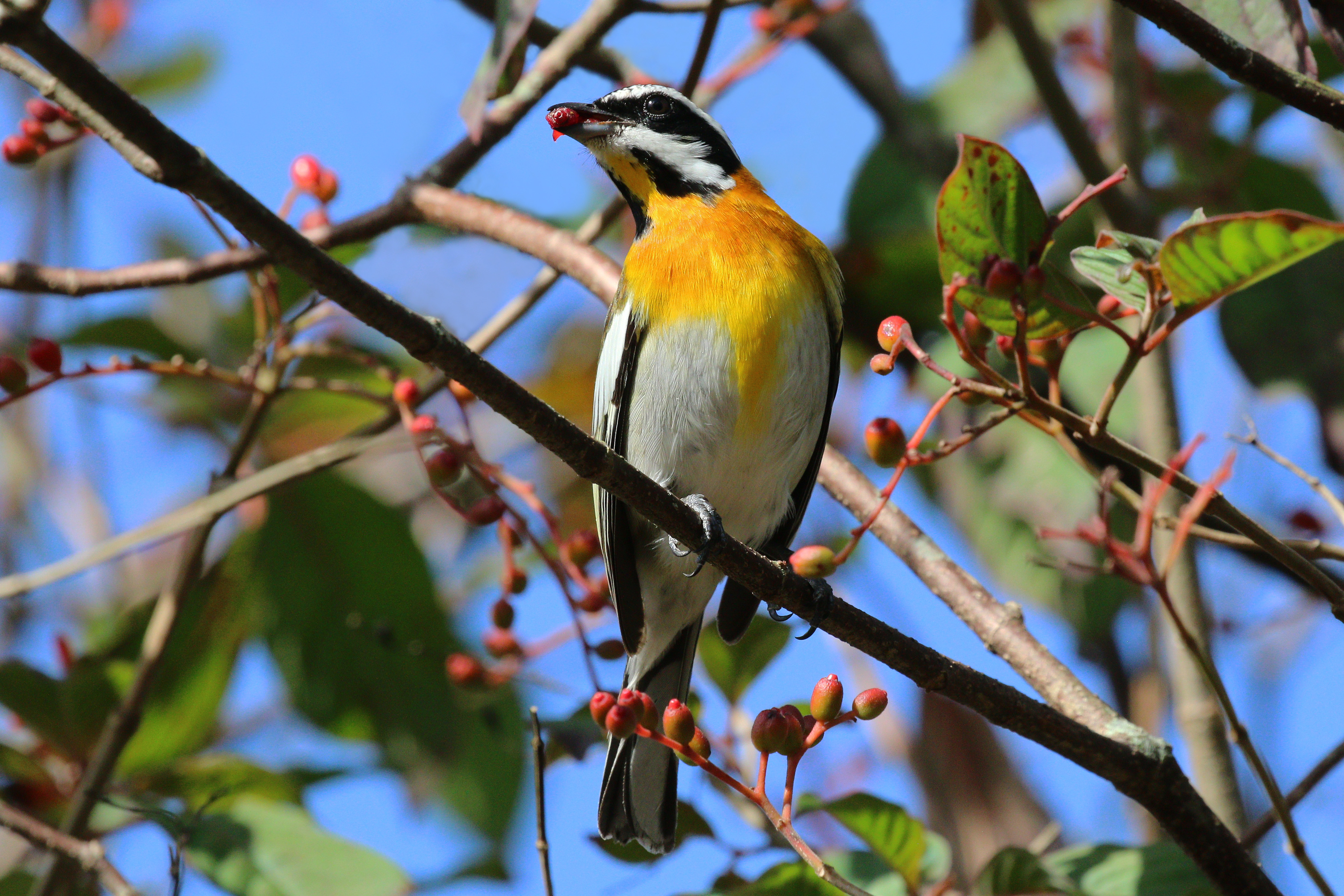
Western spindalis

Order: Passeriformes Family: Spindalidae

The members of this small family are native to the Greater Antilles. They were formerly classified as tanagers (family Thraupidae) but were placed in their own family in 2017.

- Western spindalis, Spindalis zena

== Yellow-breasted chat ==
Order: Passeriformes Family: Icteriidae

This species was historically placed in the New World warblers (Parulidae) but nonetheless most authorities were unsure if it belonged there. It was moved to its own family in 2017.

- Yellow-breasted chat, Icteria virens (A)

== Troupials and allies ==
Order: Passeriformes Family: Icteridae

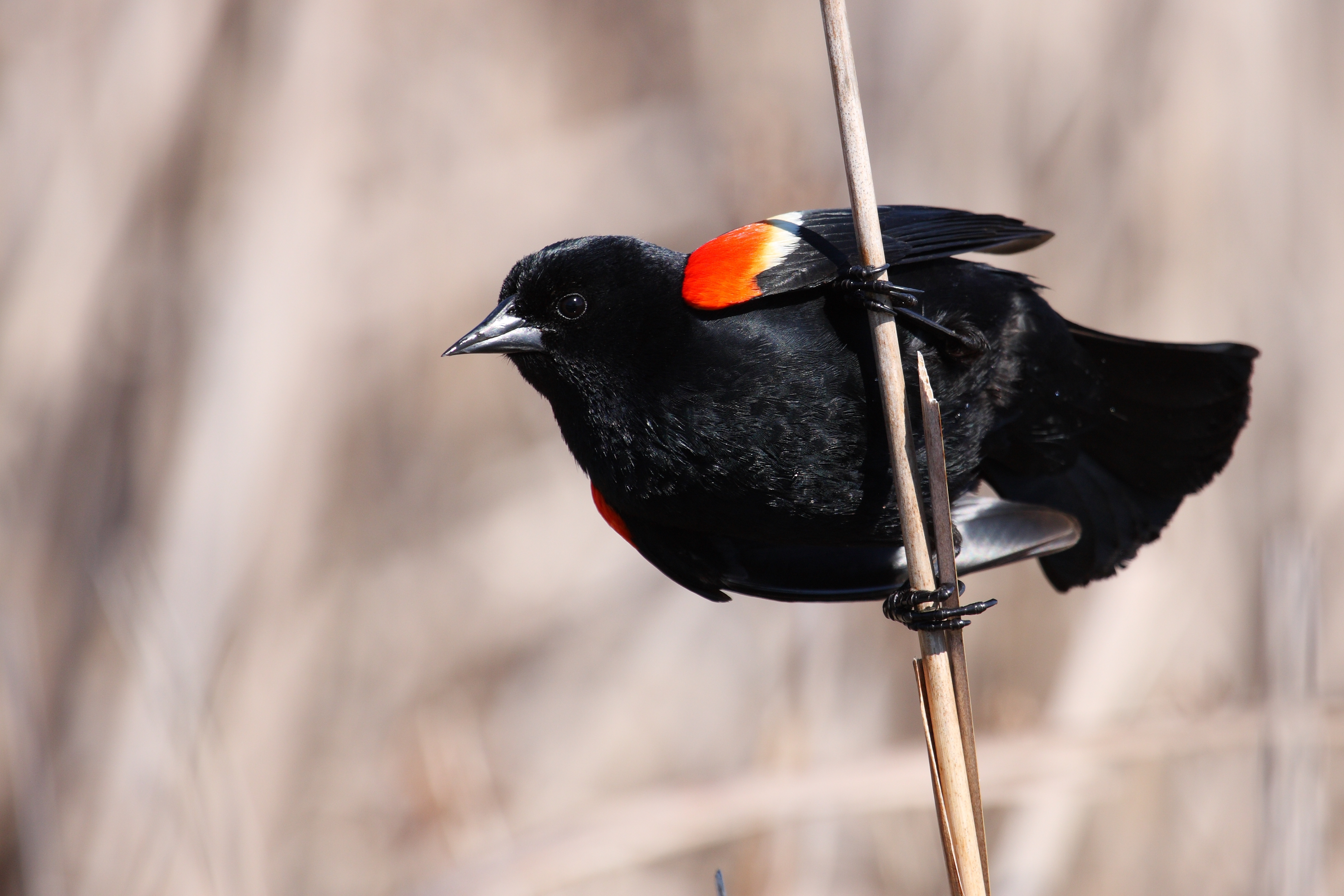
Red winged blackbird

The icterids are a group of small to medium-sized, often colourful, passerine birds restricted to the New World and include the grackles, New World blackbirds, and New World orioles. Most species have black as the predominant plumage colour, often enlivened by yellow, orange, or red.

- Yellow-headed blackbird, Xanthocephalus xanthocephalus (A)
- Bobolink, Dolichonyx oryzivorus
- Bahama oriole, Icterus northropi (E)
- Orchard oriole, Icterus spurius
- Bullock's oriole, Icterus bullockii (A)
- Baltimore oriole, Icterus galbula
- Shiny cowbird, Molothrus bonariensis
- Brown-headed cowbird, Molothrus ater
- Red-winged blackbird, Agelaius phoeniceus
- Common grackle, Quiscalus quiscula (A)
- Boat-tailed grackle, Quiscalus major

== New World warblers ==
Order: Passeriformes Family: Parulidae

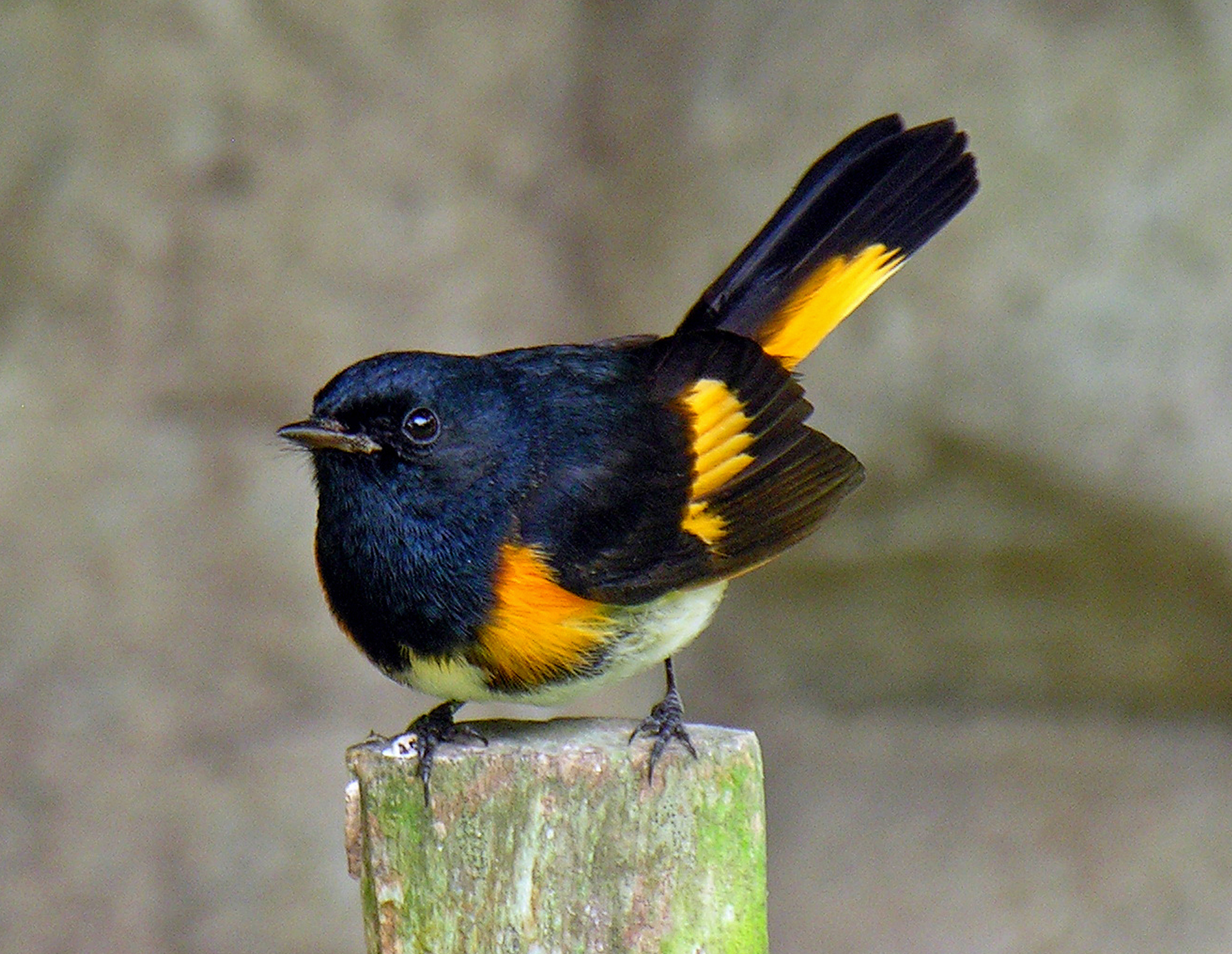
American redstart

The wood-warblers are a group of small, often colourful, passerine birds restricted to the New World. Most are arboreal, but some are terrestrial. Most members of this family are insectivores.

- Ovenbird, Seiurus aurocapilla
- Worm-eating warbler, Helmitheros vermivorum
- Louisiana waterthrush, Parkesia motacilla (A)
- Northern waterthrush, Parkesia noveboracensis
- Bachman's warbler, Vermivora bachmanii (Ex)
- Golden-winged warbler, Vermivora chrysoptera (A)
- Blue-winged warbler, Vermivora cyanoptera (A)
- Black-and-white warbler, Mniotilta varia
- Prothonotary warbler, Protonotaria citrea (A)
- Swainson's warbler, Limnothlypis swainsonii (A)
- Tennessee warbler, Leiothlypis peregrina (A)
- Orange-crowned warbler, Leiothlypis celata (A)
- Nashville warbler, Leiothlypis ruficapilla (A)
- Virginia's warbler, Leiothlypis virginiae (A)
- Connecticut warbler, Oporornis agilis (A)
- Mourning warbler, Geothlypis philadelphia (A)
- Kentucky warbler, Geothlypis formosa (A)
- Bahama yellowthroat, Geothlypis rostrata (E)
- Common yellowthroat, Geothlypis trichas
- Hooded warbler, Setophaga citrina (A)
- American redstart, Setophaga ruticilla
- Kirtland's warbler, Setophaga kirtlandii
- Cape May warbler, Setophaga tigrina
- Cerulean warbler, Setophaga cerulea (A)
- Northern parula, Setophaga americana
- Magnolia warbler, Setophaga magnolia
- Bay-breasted warbler, Setophaga castanea (A)
- Blackburnian warbler, Setophaga fusca (A)
- Yellow warbler, Setophaga petechia
- Chestnut-sided warbler, Setophaga pensylvanica (A)
- Blackpoll warbler, Setophaga striata
- Black-throated blue warbler, Setophaga caerulescens
- Palm warbler, Setophaga palmarum
- Olive-capped warbler, Setophaga pityophila
- Pine warbler, Setophaga pinus
- Yellow-rumped warbler, Setophaga coronata
- Yellow-throated warbler, Setophaga dominica
- Bahama warbler, Setophaga flavescens (E)
- Prairie warbler, Setophaga discolor
- Townsend's warbler, Setophaga townsendi (A)
- Black-throated green warbler, Setophaga virens (A)
- Canada warbler, Cardellina canadensis (A)
- Wilson's warbler, Cardellina pusilla (A)

== Cardinals and allies ==
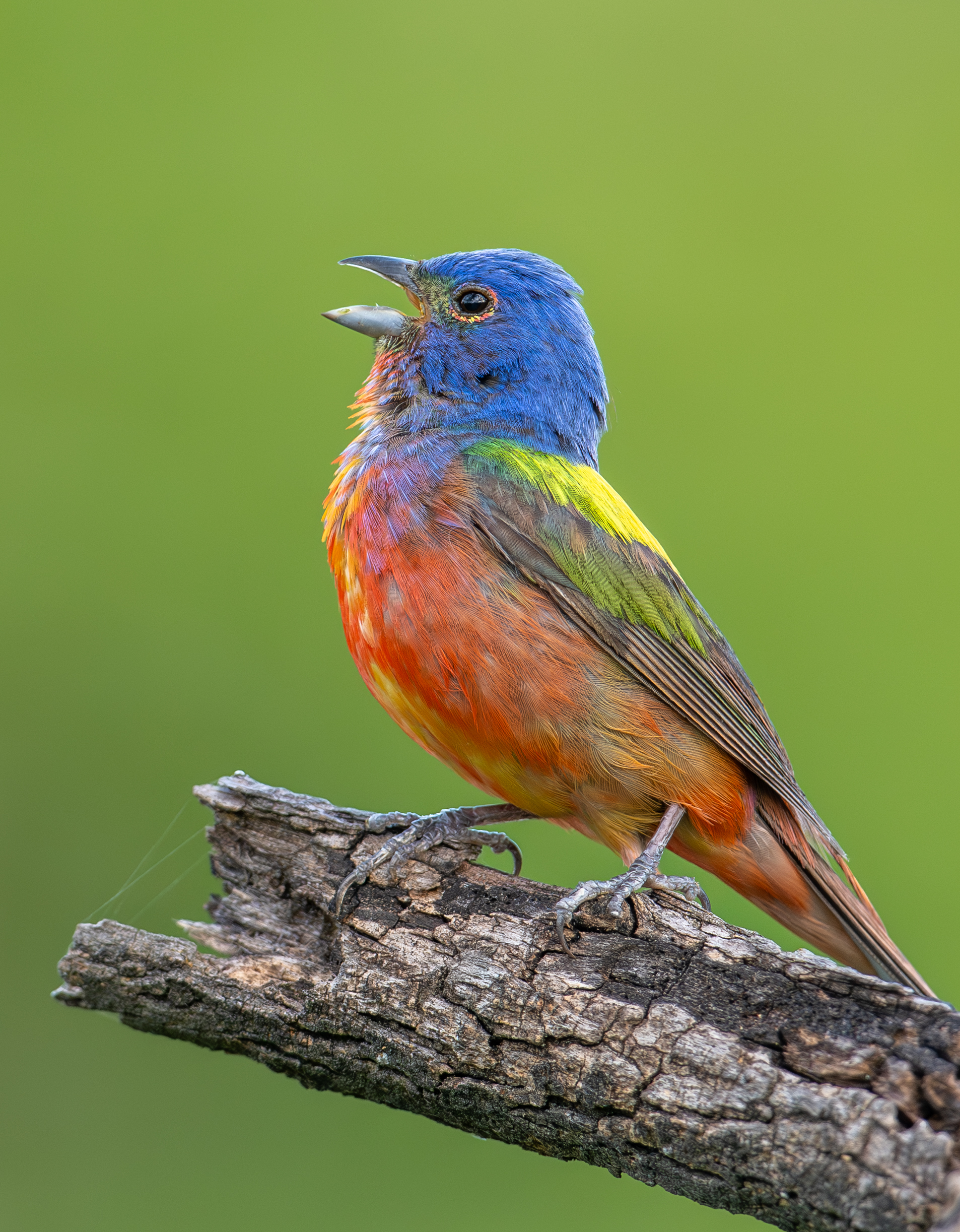
Painted bunting

Order: Passeriformes Family: Cardinalidae

The cardinals are a family of robust, seed-eating birds with strong bills. They are typically associated with open woodland. The sexes usually have distinct plumages.

- Summer tanager, Piranga rubra
- Scarlet tanager, Piranga olivacea
- Western tanager, Piranga ludoviciana (A)
- Northern cardinal, Cardinalis cardinalis (I)
- Rose-breasted grosbeak, Pheucticus ludovicianus
- Blue grosbeak, Passerina caerulea
- Indigo bunting, Passerina cyanea
- Painted bunting, Passerina ciris
- Dickcissel, Spiza americana (A)

== Tanagers and allies ==
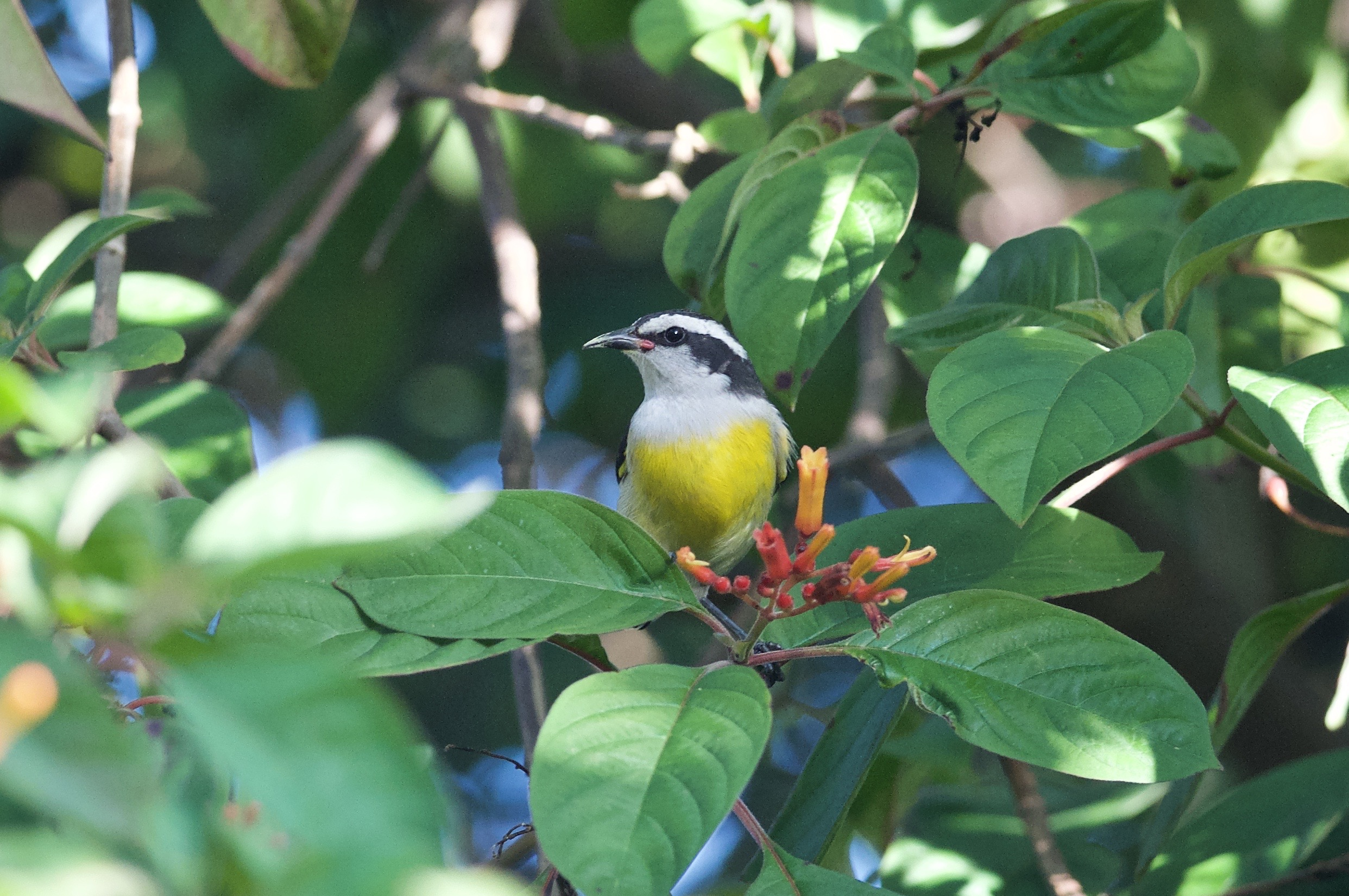
Bananaquit

Order: Passeriformes Family: Thraupidae

The tanagers are a large group of small to medium-sized passerine birds restricted to the New World, mainly in the tropics. Many species are brightly coloured. As a family they are omnivorous, but individual species specialize in eating fruits, seeds, insects, or other types of food. Most have short, rounded wings.

- Bananaquit, Coereba flaveola
- Cuban grassquit, Phonipara canora (I)
- Yellow-faced grassquit, Tiaris olivacea (I)
- Greater Antillean bullfinch, Melopyrrha violacea
- Black-faced grassquit, Melanospiza bicolor

== See also ==
- List of birds
- Lists of birds by region
