= Woodstar =

Woodstar may refer to a number of species of hummingbird in the family Trochilidae:

- Amethyst woodstar (Calliphlox amethystina)
- Bahama woodstar (Calliphlox evelynae)
- Chilean woodstar (Eulidia yarrellii)
- Esmeraldas woodstar (Chaetocercus berlepschi)
- Gorgeted woodstar (Chaetocercus heliodor)
- Inagua woodstar (Calliphlox lyrura)
- Little woodstar (Chaetocercus bombus)
- Magenta-throated woodstar (Calliphlox bryantae)
- Purple-collared woodstar (Myrtis fanny)
- Purple-throated woodstar (Calliphlox mitchellii)
- Rufous-shafted woodstar (Chaetocercus jourdanii)
- Santa Marta woodstar (Chaetocercus astreans)
- Slender-tailed woodstar (Microstilbon burmeisteri)
- White-bellied woodstar (Chaetocercus mulsant)
- Short-tailed woodstar (Myrmia micrura)
- Sparkling-tailed woodstar (Tilmatura dupontii)

== See also ==
- List of hummingbirds – species
