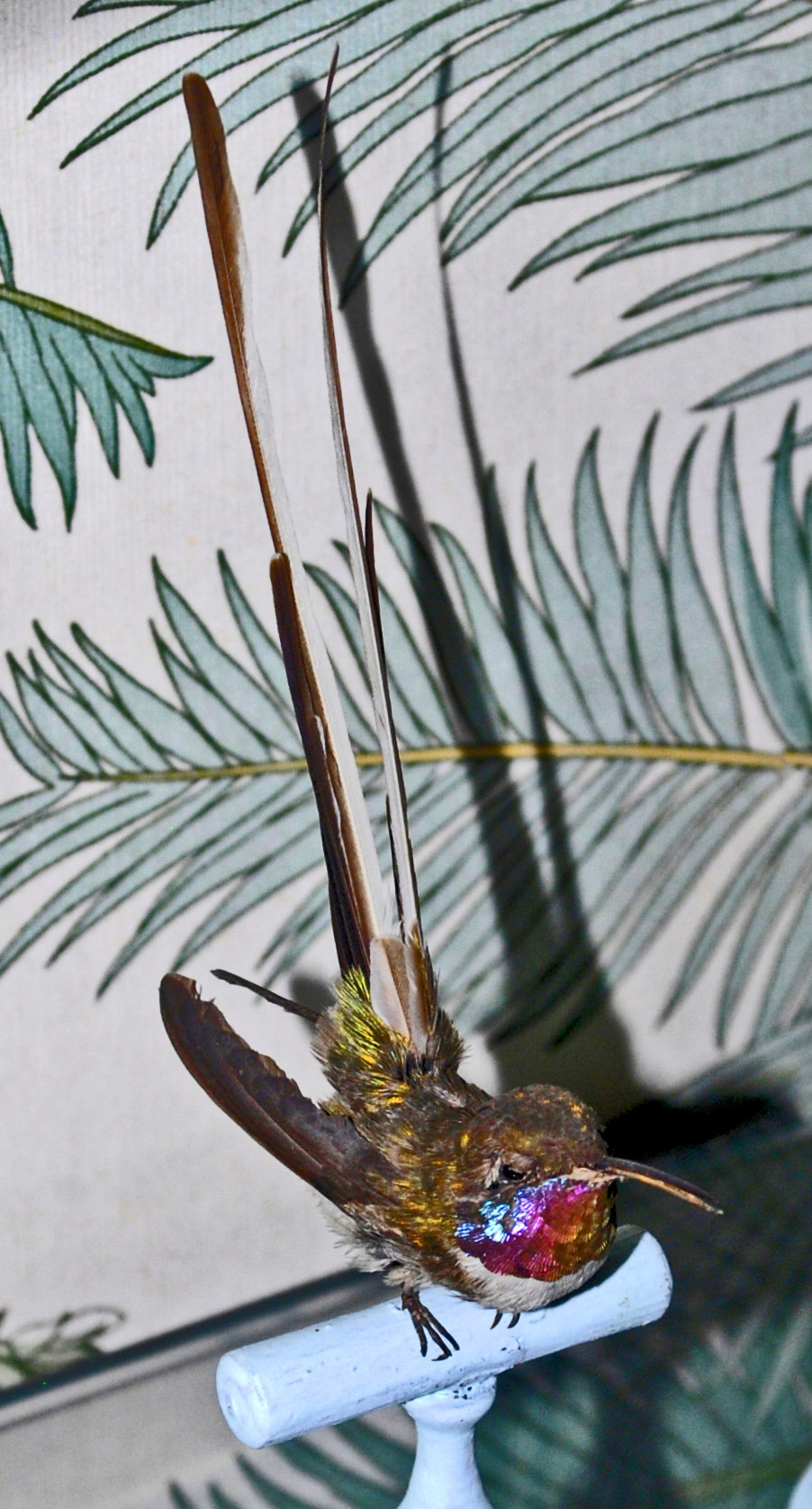
- Museum specimen

Conservation status
- Least Concern (IUCN 3.1)
- CITES Appendix II (CITES)

Scientific classification
- Kingdom: Animalia
- Phylum: Chordata
- Class: Aves
- Clade: Strisores
- Order: Apodiformes
- Family: Trochilidae
- Tribe: Mellisugini
- Genus: Thaumastura; Bonaparte, 1850
- Species: T. cora

Binomial name
- Thaumastura cora (Lesson & Garnot, 1827)

Synonyms
- Ornismya cora

= Peruvian sheartail =

Species of hummingbird

Distribution map of Thaumastura cora

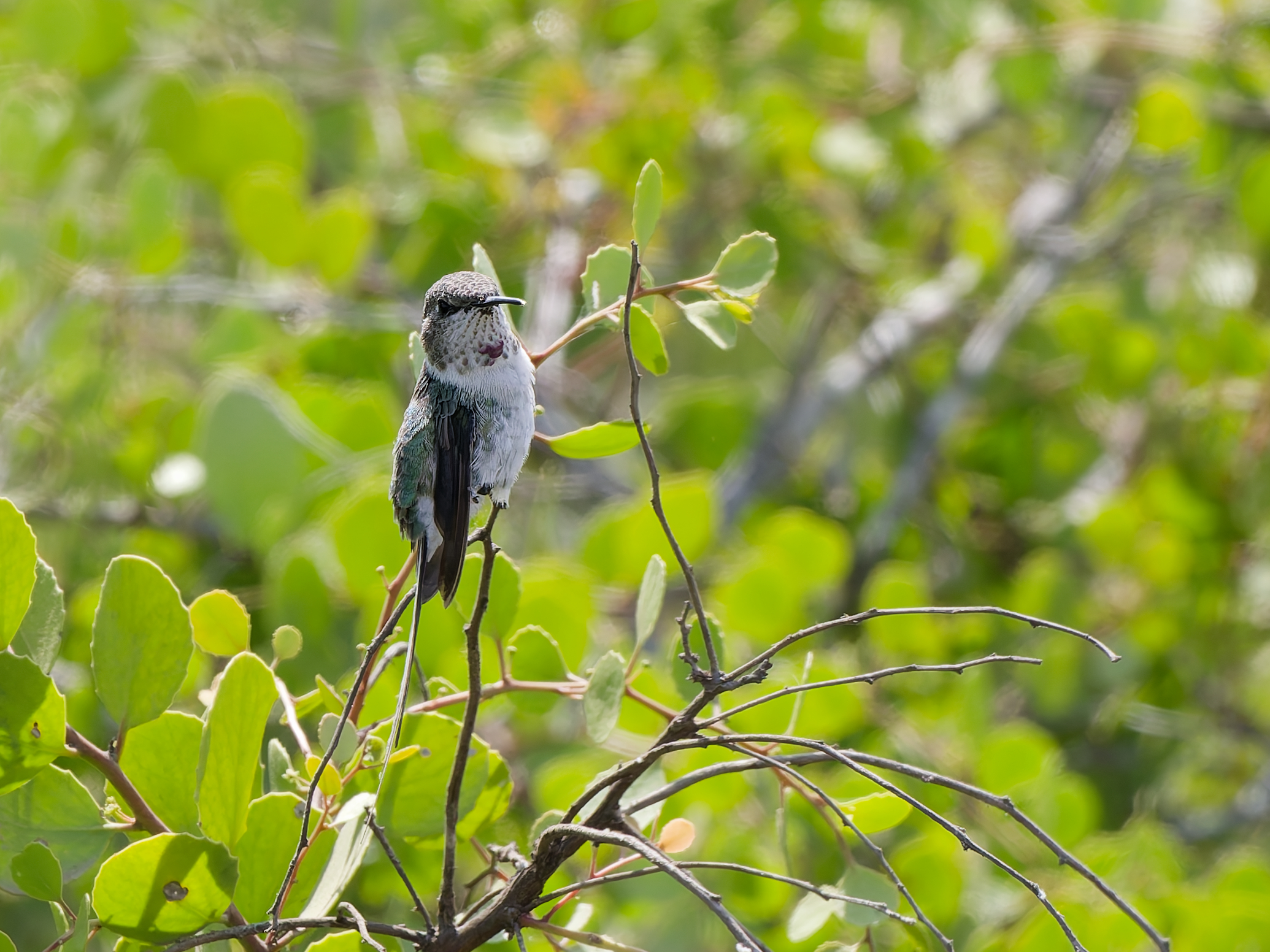
Peruvian Sheartail in Peru

The Peruvian sheartail (Thaumastura cora) is a species of hummingbird in tribe Mellisugini of subfamily Trochilinae, the "bee hummingbirds". It is the only species placed in the genus Thaumastura. It is found in Chile, Ecuador, and Peru.

== Taxonomy and systematics ==
The Peruvian sheartail was first described by René Lesson and Prosper Garnot in 1827 as Ornismya cora. Bonaparte assigned it to its current genus Thaumastura in 1850. In the past, several subspecies were assigned to it but since at least the 1950s they have all been determined to be individual variation. In addition, several other species have at times been assigned to genus Thaumastura. The Peruvian sheartail is now the only member of its genus and has no subspecies.

It is closely related to the short-tailed woodstar (Myrmia micrura), purple-collared woodstar (Myrtis fanny), and oasis hummingbird (Rhodopis vesper) despite their all being in different genera.

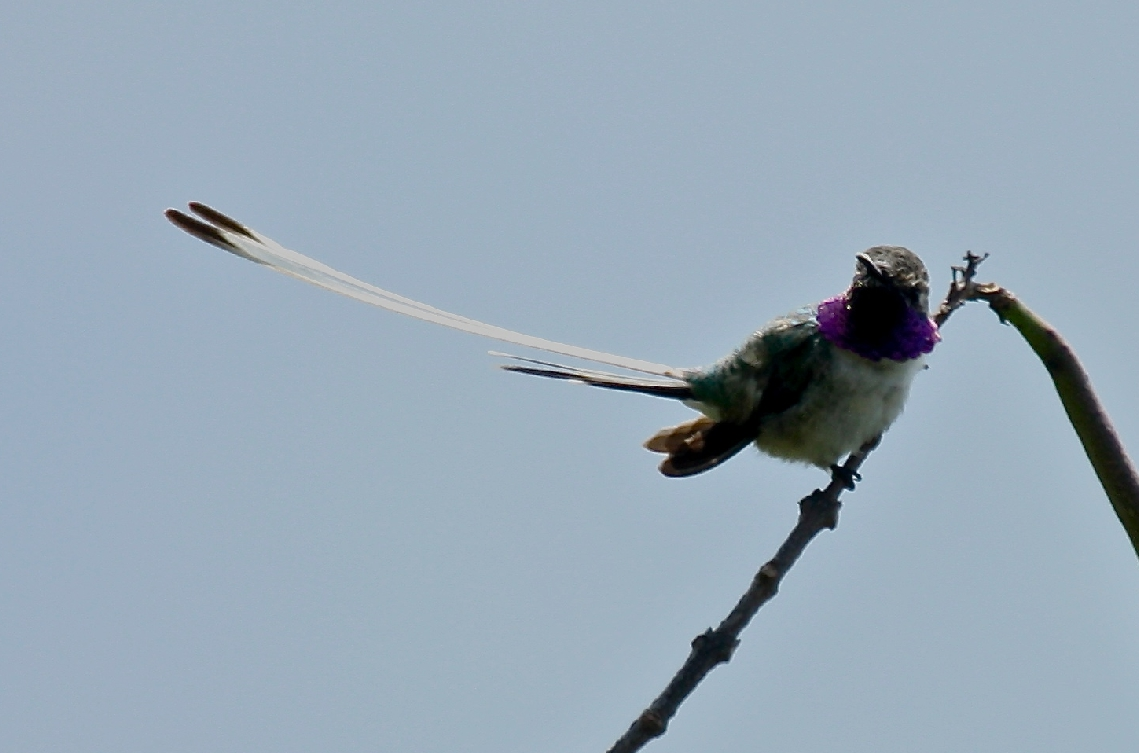
Santa Eulalia Valley - Peru

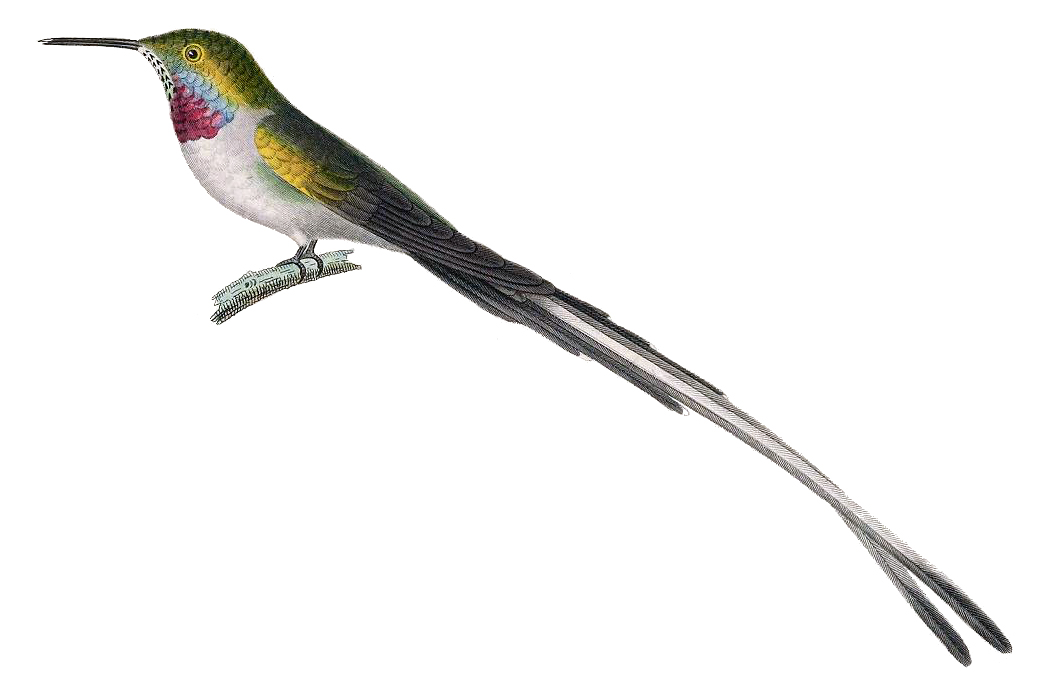
Illustration from Voyage autour du monde - Antoine Germain Bevalet (1779–1850)

== Description ==
The male Peruvian sheartail is about 14 cm (5.5 in) long and weighs about 2.5 g (0.088 oz). The female about 7.5 cm (3.0 in) long and weighs about 2.6 g (0.092 oz). It is among the tiniest hummingbirds. Both sexes have a short, straight, black bill. Both sexes have metallic green upperparts, including the top of the face, that are darker towards the tail. The female's green has a faint beige tinge. Both sexes have an indistinct white spot behind the eye. Males have an iridescent magenta gorget that appears cyan or black at different angles; the female's throat is cream. The male's breast and belly are off-white to gray into which the green of the back gently merges. The female's breast and belly are similar but darker.

The male Peruvian sheartail's most salient feature is its tail. The innermost pair of feathers are short, dark green on the outer vane and white on the inner. The next pair is very long with black outer vanes, white inner vanes, and black tips. The remaining three pairs are consecutively shorter, with black outer vanes, white inner vanes, and black tips outlined in white. The female's tail is short, with little difference in length among the feathers. The innermost pair have dark white bases followed by bronzy green outer webs and inner webs that transition from pale to almost black. The next pair are somewhat longer but not dramatically so as in the male; the feathers are mostly black with white tips. The third pair are black with white both near the body and at the tip. The outermost two pairs are black with white tips.

Sources vary in their published weights for the Peruvian sheartail. Some state that it is the lightest hummingbird in South America. Other species that might rival that claim are the short-tailed woodstar and the three woodstars of genus Chaetocercus.

== Distribution and habitat ==
The Peruvian sheartail is found from far southwestern Ecuador through the entire length of western Peru and into northwestern Chile. Its presence in Ecuador is relatively recent; the first sighting was in the early 2000s and since then there are fewer than 10 eBird records. It is expanding its range in Chile, where it was first reported in 1971. The population in the Azapa Valley "is presently in the thousands", and it is also found further south.

The Peruvian sheartail's native habitat is the arid coastal zone with sparse and scrubby vegetation. It is also readily found in farmland, gardens, and orchards. In elevation it ranges from sea level to about 2,800 m (9,200 ft) and possibly to above 3,300 m (10,800 ft). However, it is most common near sea level.

== Behavior ==
=== Movement ===
The Peruvian sheartail is generally resident throughout its range, but because it has colonized isolated islands of suitable habitat in otherwise barren landscapes it must at least make exploratory movements.

=== Feeding ===
The Peruvian sheartail forages for nectar at a variety of flowering plants, both native and introduced such as Eucalyptus. It usually feeds by hovering but sometimes clings to the flower. It occasionally visits hummingbird feeders. During the breeding season males defend territories, but it is unclear whether these are for courtship, feeding, or both. In addition to feeding on nectar it captures small insects by hawking from a perch.

=== Breeding ===
Male Peruvian sheartails defend territories during the breeding season. Some observed territories are rich in flowers but others have few or none, so it is not clear whether they are guarding feeding resources or courtship display areas. Females tend to remain fairly deep in vegetation and males' display flights sometimes even penetrate the cover. The display flights can take the form of long J-shaped "dives", or "shuttles" where he flies on a shorter, more nearly horizontal plane or arc. During most dives and some shuttles the tail feathers are spread and produce a mechanical fluttering sound. Males sing during shuttles but not dives.

The Peruvian sheartail's breeding phenology is otherwise poorly known. There is evidence that the species breeds twice a year, between March and May and between September and November. Its nest is a small cup; some have been seen with tiny flowers on the outside instead of the lichen that other hummingbirds commonly use. The incubation period and time to fledging are not known.

=== Vocalization ===
The male Peruvian sheartail's song is "squeaky, incessant, undirected [and] has at least 4 syllables". It is given from a perch or during the shuttle flight and can last a minute or more. Shorter versions are given during agonistic encounters with other males. Both sexes make "a short chip call".

== Status ==
The IUCN has assessed the Peruvian sheartail as being of Least Concern. It has a fairly large range, and though its population size is not known, it is believed to be stable. It readily uses human-modified landscapes such as gardens and "is not threatened by land use change".
