= Bee bird =

The term bee bird may refer to:

- Bee-eater, an Old World group of birds in the family Meropidae
- Bee hummingbird, a bird native to Cuba that is the world's smallest
- Bumblebee hummingbird, a bird endemic in Mexico
