= Philodice =

Philodice may refer to:

- Philodice (mythology)
- Philodice (bird), a genus of hummingbirds
- Philodice (plant) a genus of flowering plants in the family Eriocaulaceae
- Colias philodice, a species of butterfly
