= Sheartail =

Sheartail can refer to:

- hummingbirds in 3 genera, Calothorax, Doricha and Thaumastura
- The Peruvian Sheartail
