= Glow-throated hummingbird =

Conservation status
- Endangered (IUCN 3.1)
- CITES Appendix II

Scientific classification
- Kingdom: Animalia
- Phylum: Chordata
- Class: Aves
- Order: Apodiformes
- Family: Trochilidae
- Genus: Selasphorus
- Species: S. ardens

Binomial name
- Selasphorus ardens Salvin, 1870

The glow-throated hummingbird (Selasphorus ardens) is an Endangered species of hummingbird in tribe Mellisugini of subfamily Trochilinae, the "bee hummingbirds". It is endemic to a small area of Panama.

== Taxonomy and systematics ==
The Glow-throated Hummingbird has two subspecies, one recently discovered in the Cerro Hoya Nacional Park on the Azuero peninsula, and the other being found in the central cordillera (Santa Fe, Cerro Santiago etc.) on the Cerro Hoya subspecies the pinkish color of the male's gorget extends to the crown (the female's crown being brown), while the other subspecies on both sexes has a green crown.

== Description ==
The glow-throated hummingbird is about 7 cm (2.8 in) long. Both sexes have a short, straight, black bill. The adult male has bronzy green upperparts and the tail feathers are black with rufous edges. Its gorget is pinkish red with a white foreneck below it. The center of the breast and belly are also white and the rest of the underparts buffy to cinnamon with green spangles and buffy white undertail coverts. Adult females are also bronzy green above. Their central tail feathers are green; the rest have rufous bases, a black band near the end, and deep buffy tips. The throat is pale buff with grayish speckles and the rest of the underparts are like the male's. Immature birds resemble adult females but have rusty fringes on their head and nape feathers and more green on the tail.

== Distribution and habitat ==
The glow-throated hummingbird is found only in west-central Panama's Chiriquí and Veraguas provinces. It was historically found more widely in Serranía de Tabasará but since the early 20th century is known only from Cerro Colorado and Cerro Flores in Chiriquí and Cerro Tute and the Santa Fé district in Veraguas. There are unsatisfactory sight records from the Azuero Peninsula, where its presence is considered hypothetical. It inhabits the edges and clearings of Talamancan montane forest at elevations between 750 and 1,800 m (2,500 and 5,900 ft).

== Behavior ==
=== Movement ===
The movements of the glow-throated hummingbird, if any, are unknown.

=== Feeding ===
Nothing is known about the foraging behavior or diet of the glow-throated hummingbird. Both are assumed to be similar to that of its close relative, the scintillant hummingbird (S. scintilla). That species, like most hummingbirds, feeds on nectar from flowers and on small insects.

=== Breeding ===
Nothing is known about the glow-throated hummingbird's breeding phenology.

=== Vocalization ===
As of July 2022 neither the Cornell Lab of Ornithology's Macaulay Library nor xeno-canto have any recordings of the glow-throated hummingbird's vocalizations.

== Status ==
The IUCN originally assessed the glow-throated hummingbird in 1988 as Threatened, then in 1994 reassessed it as Vulnerable and in 2013 as Endangered. It has a very restricted range that has shrunk since the 19th century. Its population is estimated at between 2000 and 12,000 mature individuals and is believed to be decreasing. Though it is found in Santa Fé National Park, outside the park and even within it its forest habitat is fragmented and under continued clearing for agriculture and grazing. It also lives near the top of the rather low mountains and so is expected to undergo further range contraction as the climate continues to warm.
