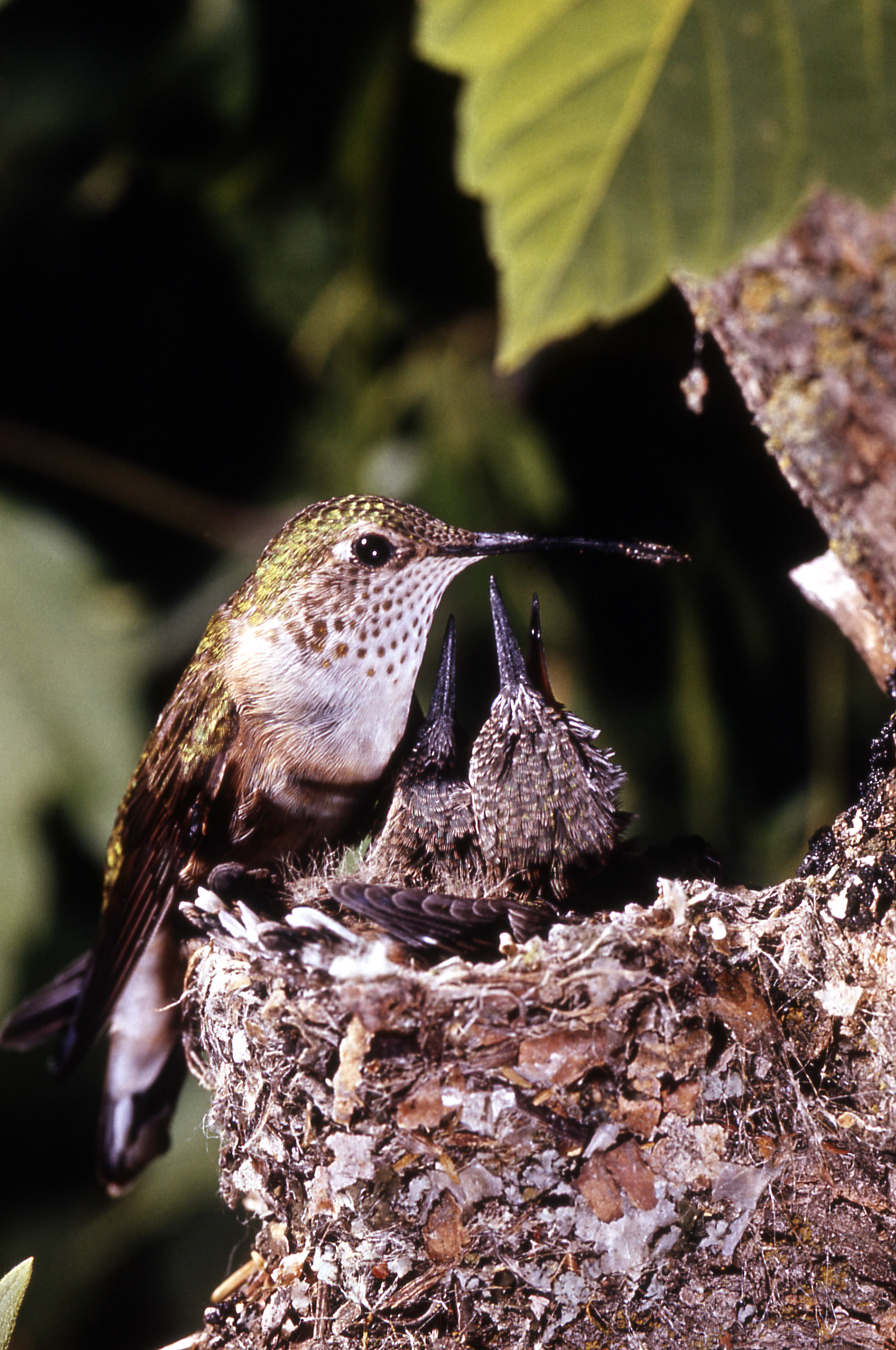
- Female broad-tailed hummingbird (Selasphorus platycercus) at nest

Scientific classification
- Domain: Eukaryota
- Kingdom: Animalia
- Phylum: Chordata
- Class: Aves
- Clade: Strisores
- Order: Apodiformes
- Family: Trochilidae
- Subfamily: Trochilinae
- Tribe: Mellisugini
- Genus: Selasphorus; Swainson, 1832

Type species
- Selasphorus rufus Gmelin, 1788

Species
- See text

Synonyms
- Atthis Reichenbach, 1854; Stellula Gould, 1861

= Selasphorus =

Genus of birds

Selasphorus is a genus of hummingbirds from Middle and North America.

== Taxonomy ==
The genus Selasphorus was introduced in 1832 by the English naturalist William Swainson to accommodate the rufous hummingbird which is now the type species. The name combines the Ancient Greek selas meaning "light" or "flame" with -phoros meaning "-carrying".

The genus contains the following nine species:

Genus Selasphorus – Swainson, 1832 – nine species
Common name	Scientific name and subspecies	Range	Size and ecology	IUCN status and estimated population
Glow-throated hummingbird	Selasphorus ardens Salvin, 1870	western Panama	Size: Habitat: Diet:	EN
Calliope hummingbird Male Female	Selasphorus calliope (Gould, 1847)	California to British Columbia, and migrates to the Southwestern United States, Mexico	Size: Habitat: Diet:	LC
Wine-throated hummingbird	Selasphorus ellioti (Ridgway, 1878) Two subspecies: S. e. ellioti; S. e. selasphoroides	El Salvador, Guatemala, Honduras, and Mexico.	Size: Habitat: Diet:	LC
Volcano hummingbird Male Female	Selasphorus flammula (Salvin, 1865) Three subspecies: S. f. flammula; S. f. torridus; S. f. simoni	Costa Rica and western Panama.	Size: Habitat: Diet:	LC
Bumblebee hummingbird Male Female	Selasphorus heloisa (Lesson & Delattre, 1839) Two subspecies: S. h. heloisa; S. h. margarethae	Mexico	Size: Habitat: Diet:	LC
Broad-tailed hummingbird Male Female	Selasphorus platycercus (Swainson, 1827)	western United States and Western Canada to Mexico and Guatemala.	Size: Habitat: Diet:	LC
Rufous hummingbird Male Female	Selasphorus rufus (Gmelin, JF, 1788)	western United States and Mexican state of Guerrero	Size: Habitat: Diet:	NT
Allen's hummingbird Male Female	Selasphorus sasin (Lesson, RP, 1829) Two subspecies: S. s. sasin (Lesson, R, 1829); S. s. sedentarius Grinnell, 1929	coastal California from Santa Barbara north, southern coastal Oregon, and southern central Mexico.	Size: Habitat: Diet:	LC
Scintillant hummingbird Male Female	Selasphorus scintilla (Gould, 1851)	Costa Rica and Panama	Size: Habitat: Diet:	LC

The wine-throated hummingbird and the bumblebee hummingbird were formerly placed in the genus Atthis. Molecular phylogenetic studies published in 2014 and 2017 found that Atthis was embedded within Selasphorus. The genera were therefore merged and these hummingbirds were moved to Selasphorus.
