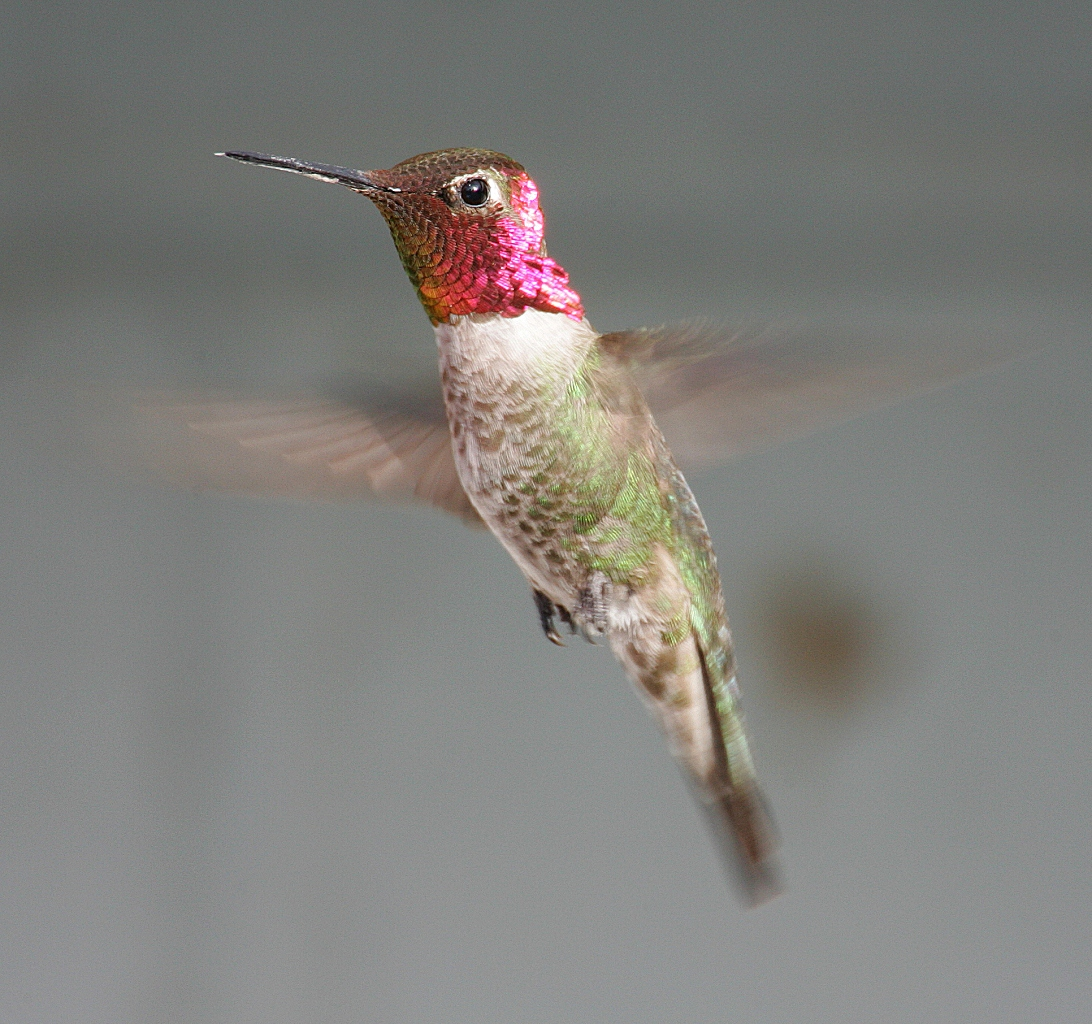
- Male Anna's hummingbird

Scientific classification
- Kingdom: Animalia
- Phylum: Chordata
- Class: Aves
- Order: Apodiformes
- Family: Trochilidae
- Tribe: Mellisugini
- Genus: Calypte; Gould, 1856

Type species
- Ornismya costae Bourcier, 1839

Species
- C. anna; C. costae

= Calypte =

Genus of birds

Calypte is a genus of hummingbirds. It consists of two species found in western North America.

== Taxonomy ==
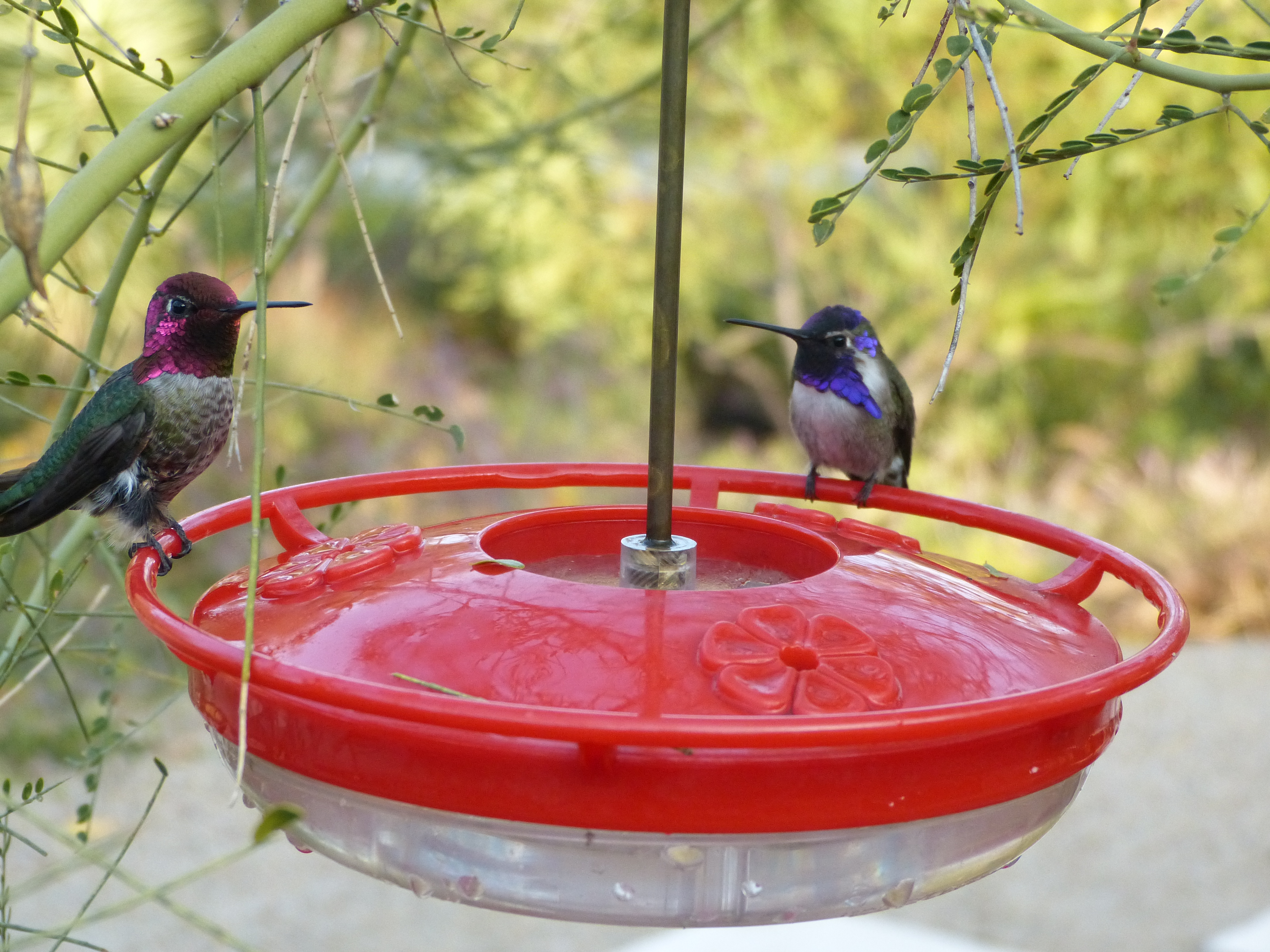
Male Anna's (left) and Costa's (right) hummingbirds, at a feeder in Los Angeles

The genus Calypte was introduced in 1856 by the English ornithologist John Gould. The type species was subsequently designated as Costa's hummingbird. Gould did not explain the derivation of the genus name but it is probably from the Ancient Greek kaluptrē meaning "woman’s veil" or "head-dress" (from kaluptō meaning "to cover"). The genus now contains two species.

== Species ==
Genus Calypte – Gould, 1856 – two species
Common name	Scientific name and subspecies	Range	Size and ecology	IUCN status and estimated population
Anna's hummingbird Male Female	Calypte anna (Lesson, 1829)	United States(Oregon, Washington, California), Canada, and Baja California, Mexico	Size: 3.9 to 4.3 in (9.9 to 10.9 cm) long with a wingspan of 4.7 inches (12 cm) and a weight range of 0.1 to 0.2 oz (2.8 to 5.7 g) Habitat: chaparral up to altitude of 2,825 meters Diet: nectar and flying insects	LC
Costa's hummingbird Male Female	Calypte costae (Bourcier, 1839)	Southwestern United States and the Baja California Peninsula of Mexico.	Size: 3–3.5 in (7.6–8.9 cm) in length, with a wingspan of 11 cm, and an average weight of 3.05 g for males and 3.22 g for females. Habitat: arid brushy deserts and gardens Diet: flower nectar and small insects	LC
