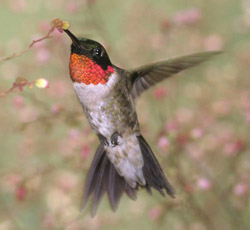
- Male ruby-throated hummingbird

Scientific classification
- Kingdom: Animalia
- Phylum: Chordata
- Class: Aves
- Order: Apodiformes
- Family: Trochilidae
- Tribe: Mellisugini
- Genus: Archilochus; Reichenbach, 1854

Type species
- Trochilus alexandri Bourcier & Mulsant, 1846

Species
- 2, see text

= Archilochus (bird) =

Genus of birds

Archilochus is a genus of hummingbirds. It consists of two small migratory species which breed in North America and winter in Central America, Mexico and the southern United States.

The genus Archilochus was introduced in 1854 by the German naturalist Ludwig Reichenbach with the black-chinned hummingbird as the type species. The name Archilochus is that of a Greek lyric poet from the island of Paros who lived around 650 BC. Two species are placed in the genus.

Genus Archilochus – Reichenbach, 1854 – two species
Common name	Scientific name and subspecies	Range	Size and ecology	IUCN status and estimated population
Ruby-throated hummingbird Male Female	Archilochus colubris (Linnaeus, 1758)	Central America, Mexico, and Florida, and migrates to Eastern North America	Size: Habitat: Diet:	LC
Black-chinned hummingbird Male Female	Archilochus alexandri (Bourcier & Mulsant, 1846)	Western United States, reaching north into Canada in Alberta and British Columbia, east to Oklahoma, and as far south as Mexico.	Size: Habitat: Diet:	LC
