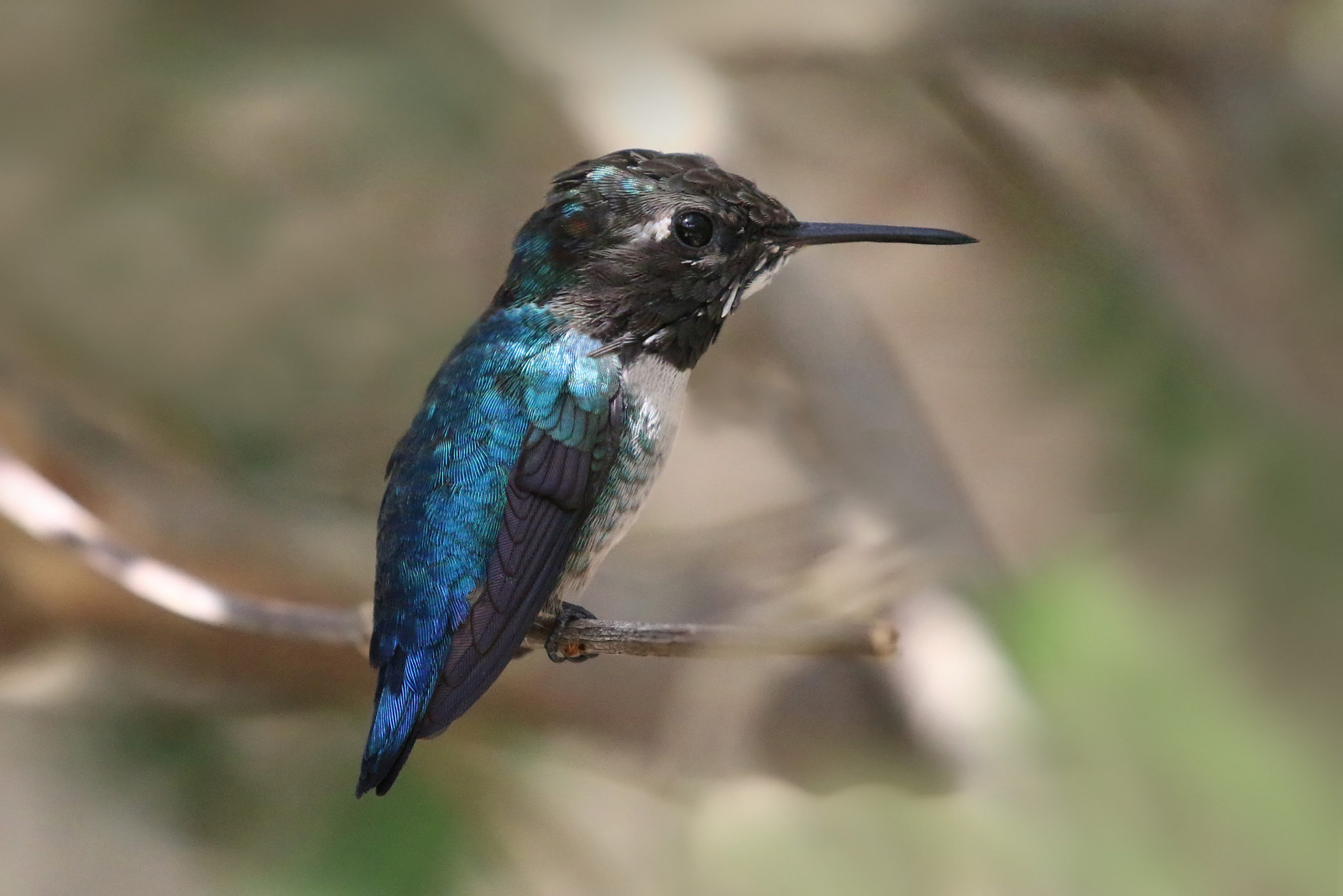
- Bee hummingbird (Melisuga helenae)

Scientific classification
- Kingdom: Animalia
- Phylum: Chordata
- Class: Aves
- Order: Apodiformes
- Family: Trochilidae
- Subfamily: Trochilinae
- Tribe: Mellisugini; Reichenbach, 1854

Genera
- 16, see text

= Mellisugini =

Tribe of the Trochilinae

Mellisugini is one of the three tribes that make up the subfamily Trochilinae in the hummingbird family Trochilidae. The other two tribes in the subfamily are Lampornithini (mountain gems) and Trochilini (emeralds).

The informal name "bees" has been proposed for this group as it includes the tiny bee hummingbird (Mellisuga helenae) that is endemic to Cuba.

The tribe contains 37 species divided into 16 genera.

== Phylogeny ==
A molecular phylogenetic study of the hummingbirds published in 2007 found that the family was composed of nine major clades. When Edward Dickinson and James Van Remsen, Jr. updated the Howard and Moore Complete Checklist of the Birds of the World for the 4th edition in 2013 they based their classification on these results and placed three of the nine clades in the subfamily Trochilinae. The clades were placed in separate tribes which they named Mellisugini (bees), Lampornithini (mountain gems) and Trochilini (emeralds). The tribe Mellisugini with the current circumscription was introduced in 2009. A subfamily Mellisuginae had been introduced by the German naturalist Ludwig Reichenbach in 1854.

Molecular phylogenetic studies by Jimmy McGuire and collaborators published between 2007 and 2014 determined the relationships between the major groups of hummingbirds. In the cladogram below the English names are those introduced in 1997. The Latin names are those proposed by Dickinson and Remsen in 2013.

- Trochilidae
  - - Florisuginae – topazes
    - Phaethornithinae – hermits
  - - Polytminae – mangoes
    - - Lesbiinae
        - Heliantheini – brilliants
        - Lesbiini – coquettes
      - - Patagoninae – giant hummingbird
        - Trochilinae
          - - Lampornithini – mountain gems
            - Mellisugini – bees
          - Trochilini – emeralds

The cladogram below shows the relationships between the genera and is based on a molecular phylogenetic study by Yuyini Licona-Vera and Juan Francisco Ornelas published in 2017. The results are in agreement with the phylogeny by Jimmy McGuire and collaborators published in 2014.

- Mellisugini
  - - woodstars
      - Tilmatura – sparkling-tailed woodstar
      - - Calliphlox – amethyst woodstar
        - - - - Thaumastura – Peruvian sheartail
              - Myrmia – short-tailed woodstar
            - - Myrtis – purple-collared woodstar
              - Rhodopis – oasis hummingbird
          - - Eulidia – Chilean woodstar
            - - Philodice – woodstars (2 species)
              - - Microstilbon – slender-tailed woodstar
                - Chaetocercus – woodstars (6 species)
    - - sheartails
        - - Calothorax – sheartails (2 species)
          - Doricha – sheartails (2 species)
        - - Archilochus – hummingbirds (2 species)
          - - Nesophlox – woodstars (2 species)
            - Mellisuga – hummingbirds (2 species)
      - - Calypte – hummingbirds (2 species)
        - Selasphorus – hummingbirds (9 species)

The genus Calliphlox was found to be polyphyletic. As part of the revised classification to create monophyletic genera, the Bahama woodstar and the Inagua woodstar were moved to the resurrected genus Nesophlox. Later, the genus Philodice was resurrected to accommodate the purple-throated woodstar and the amethyst woodstar.

The genus Atthis containing the wine-throated hummingbird and the bumblebee hummingbird was embedded within Selasphorus. The genera were therefore merged and as under the rules of the International Code of Zoological Nomenclature Selasphorus has priority over Atthis the two species were moved to Selasphorus.

== Distinguishing features ==
The males of most species in the tribe Mellisugini have specialized tail feathers that produce sounds during their courtship display. This is not restricted to this tribe as males in the genus Discosura belonging to the tribe Lesbiini (coquettes) can also produce sounds from their tail feathers.

Most of the migratory hummingbirds are found in this tribe. Remarkable examples are the rufous hummingbird (Selasphorus rufus) that breeds as far north as western Canada and Alaska and overwinters in Mexico and the ruby-throated hummingbird (Archilochus colubris) that breeds in the eastern United States and then crosses the Gulf of Mexico to winter in Mexico and Central America. There are five other long-distance migrants in the tribe: the broad-tailed hummingbird (Selasphorus platycercus), the calliope hummingbird (Selasphorus calliope), Allen's hummingbird (Selasphorus sasin), the black-chinned hummingbird (Archilochus alexandri) and the lucifer sheartail (Calothorax lucifer). It is likely that migratory behaviour has evolved several times.

== Taxonomic list ==
The tribe contains 17 genera.

Image	Genus	Living species
	Calliphlox	Amethyst woodstar, Calliphlox amethystina
	Myrtis	Purple-collared woodstar, Myrtis fanny
	Rhodopis	Oasis hummingbird, Rhodopis vesper
	Myrmia	Short-tailed woodstar, Myrmia micrura
	Thaumastura	Peruvian sheartail, Thaumastura cora
	Philodice	Magenta-throated woodstar, Philodice bryantae; Purple-throated woodstar, Philodice mitchellii
	Eulidia	Chilean woodstar, Eulidia yarrellii
	Microstilbon	Slender-tailed woodstar, Microstilbon burmeisteri
	Chaetocercus	White-bellied woodstar, Chaetocercus mulsant; Little woodstar, Chaetocercus bombus; Gorgeted woodstar, Chaetocercus heliodor; Santa Marta woodstar, Chaetocercus astreans; Esmeraldas woodstar, Chaetocercus berlepschi; Rufous-shafted woodstar, Chaetocercus jourdanii
	Tilmatura	Sparkling-tailed woodstar, Tilmatura dupontii
	Doricha	Slender sheartail, Doricha enicura; Mexican sheartail, Doricha eliza
	Calothorax	Lucifer sheartail, Calothorax lucifer; Beautiful sheartail, Calothorax pulcher
	Archilochus	Black-chinned hummingbird, Archilochus alexandri; Ruby-throated hummingbird, Archilochus colubris
	Mellisuga	Vervain hummingbird, Mellisuga minima; Bee hummingbird, Mellisuga helenae
	Nesophlox	Bahama woodstar, Nesophlox evelynae; Inagua woodstar, Nesophlox lyrura
	Calypte	Anna's hummingbird, Calypte anna; Costa's hummingbird, Calypte costae
	Selasphorus	Calliope hummingbird, Selasphorus calliope; Rufous hummingbird, Selasphorus rufus; Allen's hummingbird, Selasphorus sasin; Broad-tailed hummingbird, Selasphorus platycercus; Bumblebee hummingbird, Selasphorus heloisa; Wine-throated hummingbird, Selasphorus ellioti; Volcano hummingbird, Selasphorus flammula; Scintillant hummingbird, Selasphorus scintilla; Glow-throated hummingbird, Selasphorus ardens

== Sources ==
- Dickinson, E.C.; Remsen, J.V. Jr., eds. (2013). The Howard & Moore Complete Checklist of the Birds of the World. Vol. 1: Non-passerines (4th ed.). Eastbourne, UK: Aves Press. ISBN 978-0-9568611-0-8.
