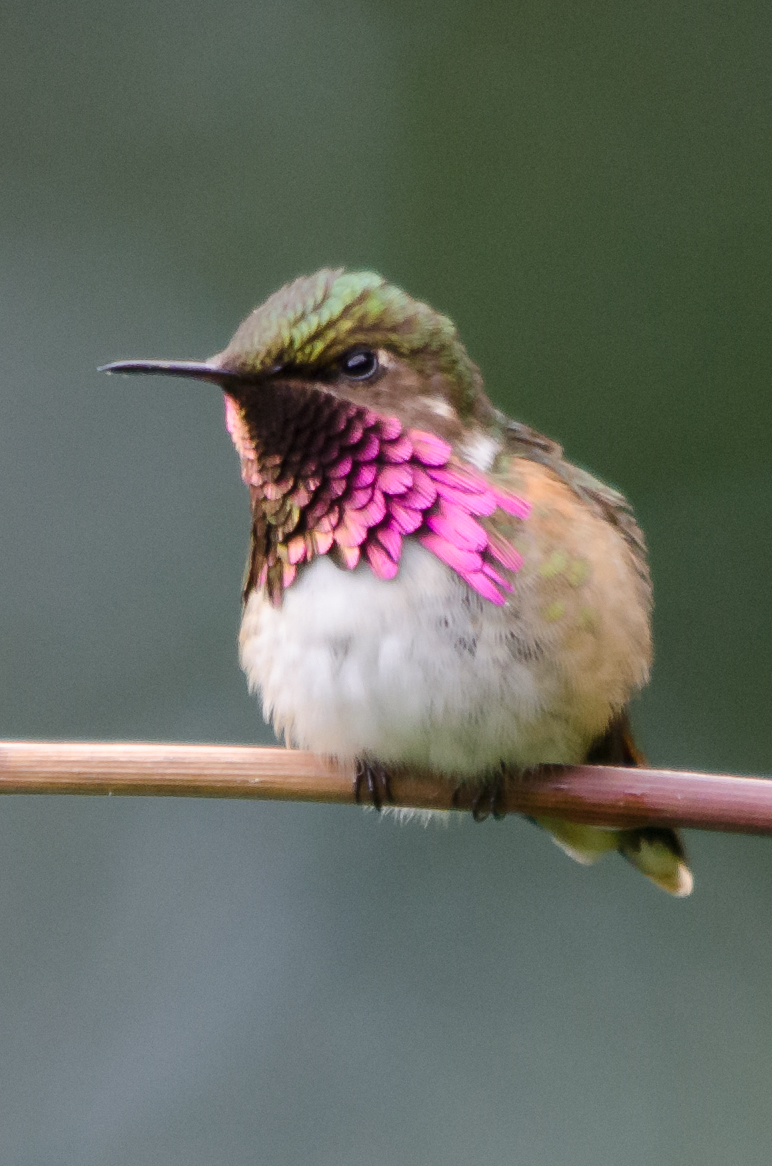
- In Guatemala

Conservation status
- Least Concern (IUCN 3.1)
- CITES Appendix II (CITES)

Scientific classification
- Domain: Eukaryota
- Kingdom: Animalia
- Phylum: Chordata
- Class: Aves
- Clade: Strisores
- Order: Apodiformes
- Family: Trochilidae
- Genus: Selasphorus
- Species: S. ellioti

Binomial name
- Selasphorus ellioti (Ridgway, 1878)

Synonyms
- Atthis ellioti

= Wine-throated hummingbird =

The wine-throated hummingbird (Selasphorus ellioti) is a species of hummingbird in tribe Mellisugini of subfamily Trochilinae, the "bee hummingbirds". It is found in El Salvador, Guatemala, Honduras, and Mexico.

== Taxonomy and systematics ==
The International Ornithological Committee (IOC), the North American Classification Committee of the American Ornithological Society, and the Clements taxonomy place the wine-throated hummingbird in genus Selasphorus. BirdLife International's Handbook of the Birds of the World (HBW) places it in genus Atthis. The three worldwide taxonomic systems assign two subspecies, the nominate S. e. ellioti/A. e. ellioti and S. e. selasphoroides/A. e. selasphoroides.

== Description ==
The wine-throated hummingbird is 6.5 to 7 cm (2.6 to 2.8 in) long. Females weigh 2 to 4 g (0.071 to 0.14 oz); male weights are not documented. Both sexes of both subspecies have a short, straight, blackish bill and a small white spot behind the eye.

Males of the nominate subspecies have green upperparts. Their gorget is glittering rose pink with violet highlights, and its longer hindward feathers flare out and back. The flanks are a mix of cinnamon and green and the rest of the underparts are whitish. The central pair of tail feathers are green with some rufous at the base. The rest of the tail feathers are rufous with a wide black band near the end; the outermost pair have white tips. The nominate female also has green upperparts. The chin and throat are white with many dusky spots. The upper breast is white, the center of the belly whitish, and the flanks and undertail coverts are cinnamon. The tail has more black and less rufous than the male's, and the outer feathers' tips are more cinnamon than white.

Subspecies S. e. selasphoroides is slightly smaller than the nominate. Males' plumage is similar to the nominate's. However, their gorget has no blue or violet and even looks green at some angles, the underparts are more buff than white, and the outer tail feather tips are buff. The female has smaller metallic spots on the throat, the flanks and undertail coverts are buff, and the inner tail feather tips are dusky and the outer ones buff.

== Distribution and habitat ==
The nominate subspecies of wine-throated hummingbird is the more northerly. It is found in southern Mexico's Chiapas state and much of Guatemala. S. e. selasphoroides is found in western Honduras and northern El Salvador. The species inhabits several montane landscapes including the interiors, edges, and clearings of semi-humid to humid pine-oak and evergreen forest, and also adjacent shrublands. In elevation it ranges between 1,500 and 3,500 m (4,900 and 11,500 ft).

== Behavior ==
=== Feeding ===
The wine-throated hummingbird forages for nectar at a variety of flowering plants, though details of its diet are lacking. It feeds at all levels of the vegetation but favors the low to middle heights; it hovers to feed. It is assumed to also eat small arthropods like most other hummingbirds.

=== Breeding ===
Male wine-throated hummingbirds display for females at dispersed leks, where they sing from an exposed branch. The species' nesting season has not been documented but could extend from August to February. Almost nothing else is known about its breeding phenology.

=== Vocal and non-vocal sounds ===
The wine-throated hummingbird's song is "a series of high, slightly buzzy, squeaky chips that break into a warble." It also makes "high, thin, sharp chips, often repeated steadily, sip-sip ... or cheup cheup ..., etc." The male's wings make a "thrum" sound when hovering to feed and also during agonistic encounters with other males.

== Status ==
The IUCN has assessed the wine-throated hummingbird as being of Least Concern. It has a large range and a population estimated at between 20,000 and 50,000 mature individuals. However, the latter is believed to be decreasing. The Mexican government considers it Threatened because its highland forest habitat is under pressure of clearing for agriculture and grazing.
