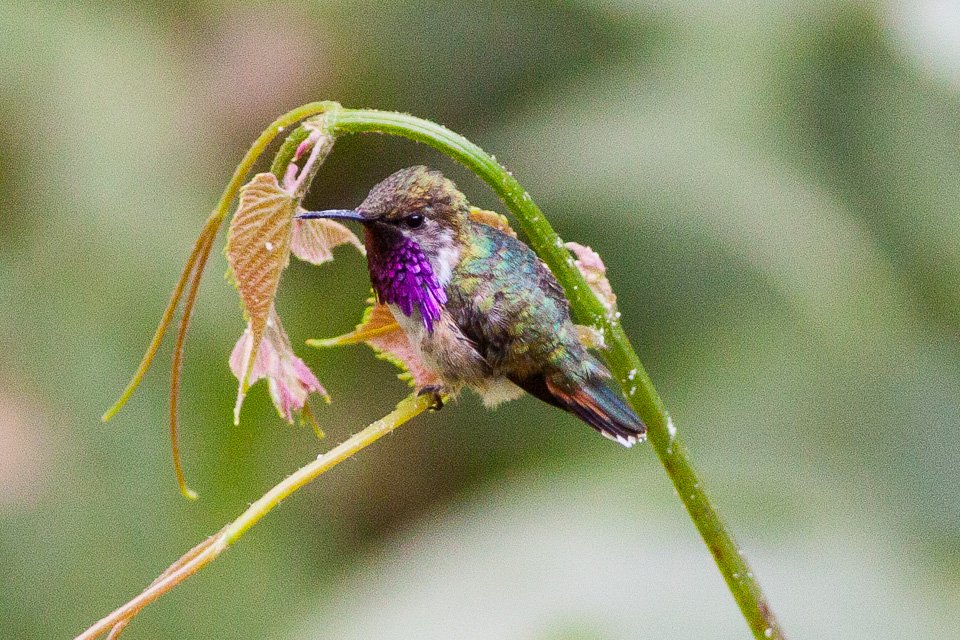

Conservation status
- Least Concern (IUCN 3.1)
- CITES Appendix II

Scientific classification
- Kingdom: Animalia
- Phylum: Chordata
- Class: Aves
- Order: Apodiformes
- Family: Trochilidae
- Genus: Selasphorus
- Species: S. heloisa

Binomial name
- Selasphorus heloisa (Lesson & Delattre, 1839)

Synonyms
- Atthis heloisa

= Bumblebee hummingbird =

Species of bird

The bumblebee hummingbird (Selasphorus heloisa) is a species of hummingbird in tribe Mellisugini of subfamily Trochilinae, the "bee hummingbirds". It is endemic to Mexico, but has occurred as a vagrant in the United States.

== Taxonomy and systematics ==
The International Ornithological Committee (IOC), the North American Classification Committee of the American Ornithological Society, and the Clements taxonomy place the bumblebee hummingbird in genus Selasphorus. BirdLife International's Handbook of the Birds of the World (HBW) places it in genus Atthis. The three worldwide taxonomic systems assign two subspecies, the nominate S. h. heloisa/A. h. heliosa and S. h. margarethae/A. h. margarethae.

== Description ==
The bumblebee hummingbird is 5.9 to 7.5 cm (2.3 to 3.0 in) long and weighs 2 to 2.7 g (0.071 to 0.095 oz); it is one of the smallest hummingbirds. Both sexes of both subspecies have a short, straight, blackish bill and a small white spot behind the eye.

Males of the nominate subspecies have metallic bronze green to golden bronze upperparts. Their gorget is metallic magenta purple to bluish purple at its edges, and its longer hindward feathers flare out and back. The flanks are light reddish cinnamon with a bronze wash. The rest of the underparts are dull white to grayish white. The central pair of tail feathers are bronzy green with some reddish cinnamon at the base. The next pair are reddish cinnamon on their base half and black on the outer half, often with a bronzy green band between the colors. The rest of the tail feathers are reddish cinnamon at their base and black in the middle, often with a bronzy green band between the colors, and have a wide white tip. The nominate female also has metallic bronze green to golden green upperparts. The chin and throat are white with many metallic bronze spots. The flanks have more reddish cinnamon than the male's and the rest of the underparts are dull white to grayish white with a reddish cinnamon tinge on the undertail coverts. The tail has less and duller reddish cinnamon and more black than the male's, and the outer feathers' tips are more off-white than white.

Subspecies S. h. margarethae is smaller than the nominate. Males' plumage is similar to the nominate's. However, their gorget is dark amethyst violet, the underparts pure white rather than grayish white, and the flanks are light buff rather than reddish cinnamon. The female has smaller metallic spots on the throat, the flanks and undertail coverts are light buff rather than cinnamon, and the tail feather tips are pure white.

== Distribution and habitat ==
The bumblebee hummingbird is found in both of Mexico's major mountain ranges. The nominate subspecies is found in northeast, central, and southern Mexico from Tamaulipas to Guerrero and Oaxaca. S. h. margarethae is found in northwestern and western Mexico from Sinaloa and Chihuahua to Jalisco. There is one record from the Huachuca Mountains of southeastern Arizona, U.S.A.

The species inhabits several montane landscapes including the interiors, edges, and clearings of semi-humid to humid pine-oak and evergreen forest, cloudforest, and humid scrublands. In elevation it ranges between 1,500 and 3,000 m (4,900 and 9,800 ft).

== Behavior ==
=== Movement ===
Though the bumblebee hummingbird is generally considered sedentary, there is evidence that it makes seasonal movements between pine-oak forest and cloudforest.

=== Feeding ===
The bumblebee hummingbird forages for nectar at a wide variety of flowering plants. It feeds at all levels of the vegetation but favors the low to middle heights. At flowers it typically hovers in a horizontal posture with the tail cocked up. It is dominated by larger hummingbirds, but its small size allows it to sometimes feed in their territories without confrontation. In addition to nectar, the species feeds on small arthropods.

=== Breeding ===
Male bumblebee hummingbirds make a courtship display by hovering in front of a female with the gorget spread and tail cocked up. They also make rhythmic vertical movements while still facing the female. Specimens in breeding condition have been collected between April and July and also in December. In contrast, Ortega-Álvarez et al. noted nesting activity from late January into early March during a study in Oaxaca. The nest was a cup made of moss and lichen with perhaps fibers from other sources as well. It was on a thin branch of an avocado tree (Persea americana) about 10 m (30 ft) above the ground. The incubation period and time to fledging are not known.

=== Vocal and non-vocal sounds ===
The bumblebee hummingbird's song has been described as "a high, thin, whining sss ssssssssis or seeuuuuu, drawn out and fading at end", and is sung from a perch. Its calls are "high chips, much like [those of other] Selasphorus." The male's wings make an insect-like buzz in flight; it is louder during the courtship display.

== Status ==
The IUCN has assessed the bumblebee hummingbird as being of least concern. It has a large range, and though its population size is unknown it is believed to be stable. No immediate threats have been identified. The Mexican government does not consider it to be threatened.
