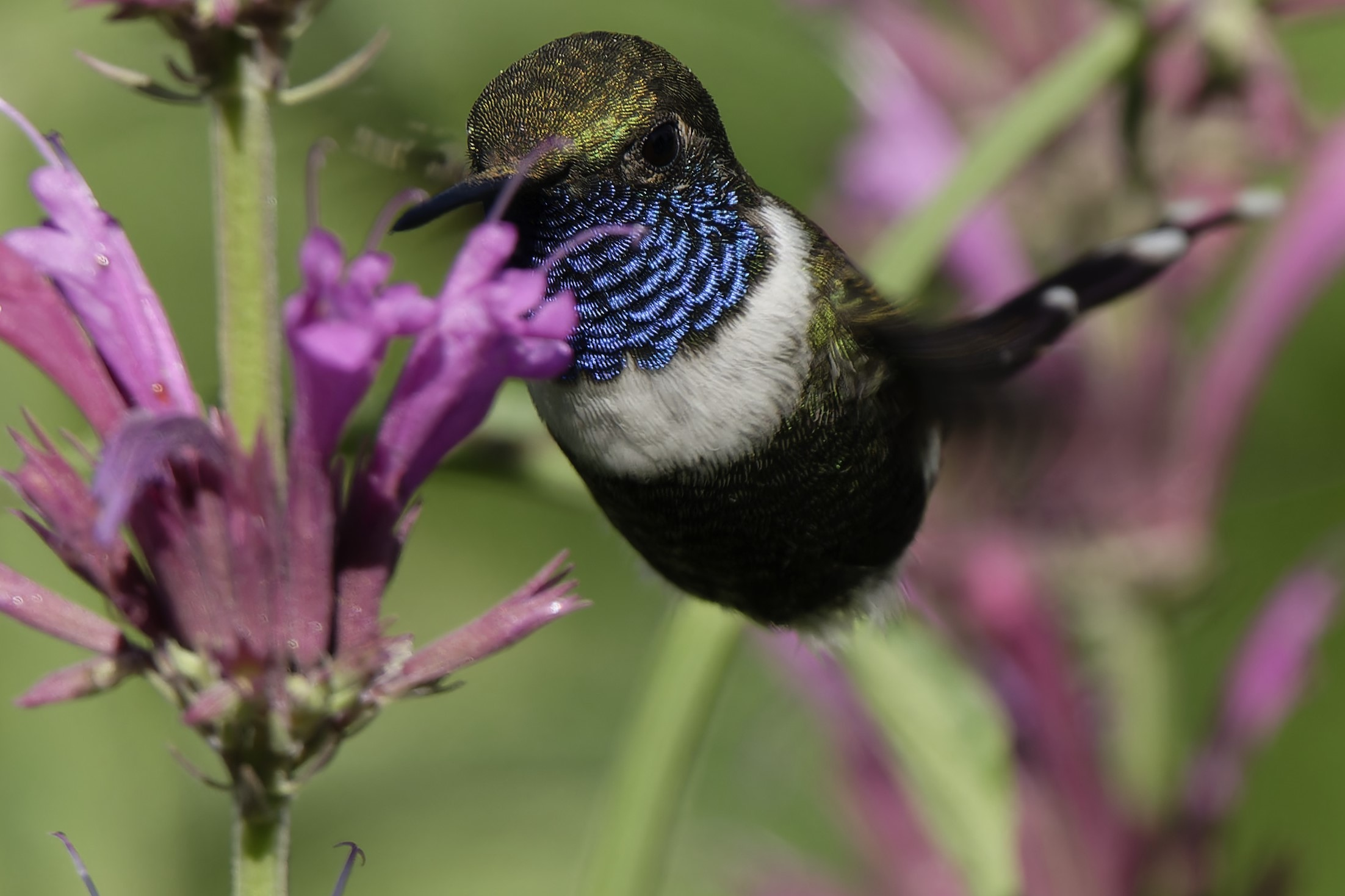

Conservation status
- Least Concern (IUCN 3.1)
- CITES Appendix II (CITES)

Scientific classification
- Kingdom: Animalia
- Phylum: Chordata
- Class: Aves
- Clade: Strisores
- Order: Apodiformes
- Family: Trochilidae
- Tribe: Mellisugini
- Genus: Tilmatura; Reichenbach, 1854
- Species: T. dupontii

Binomial name
- Tilmatura dupontii (Lesson, RP, 1832)

Synonyms
- Ornismya dupontii

= Sparkling-tailed woodstar =

Species of hummingbird

The sparkling-tailed woodstar (Tilmatura dupontii), also known as the sparkling-tailed hummingbird, is a species of hummingbird in tribe Mellisugini of subfamily Trochilinae, the "bee hummingbirds". It is the only species placed in the genus Tilmatura. It is found in El Salvador, Guatemala, Honduras, Mexico, and Nicaragua.

== Taxonomy and systematics ==
The sparkling-tailed woodstar is the only member of its genus and has no subspecies. However, some authors have proposed that it belongs to the larger genus Philodice and others have assigned a second subspecies to it. Neither of these treatments have received significant support.

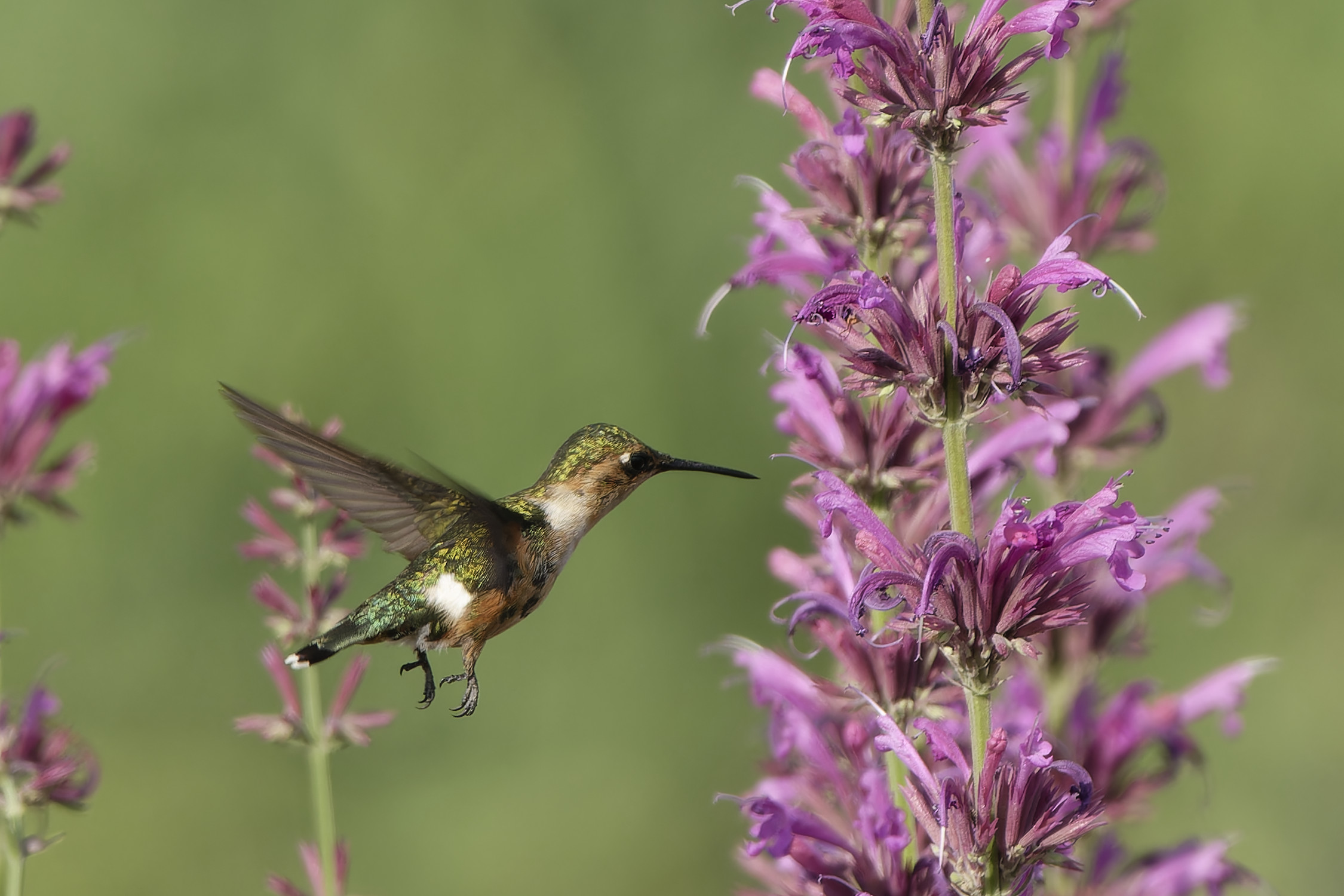
Female displaying her shorter tail.

== Description ==
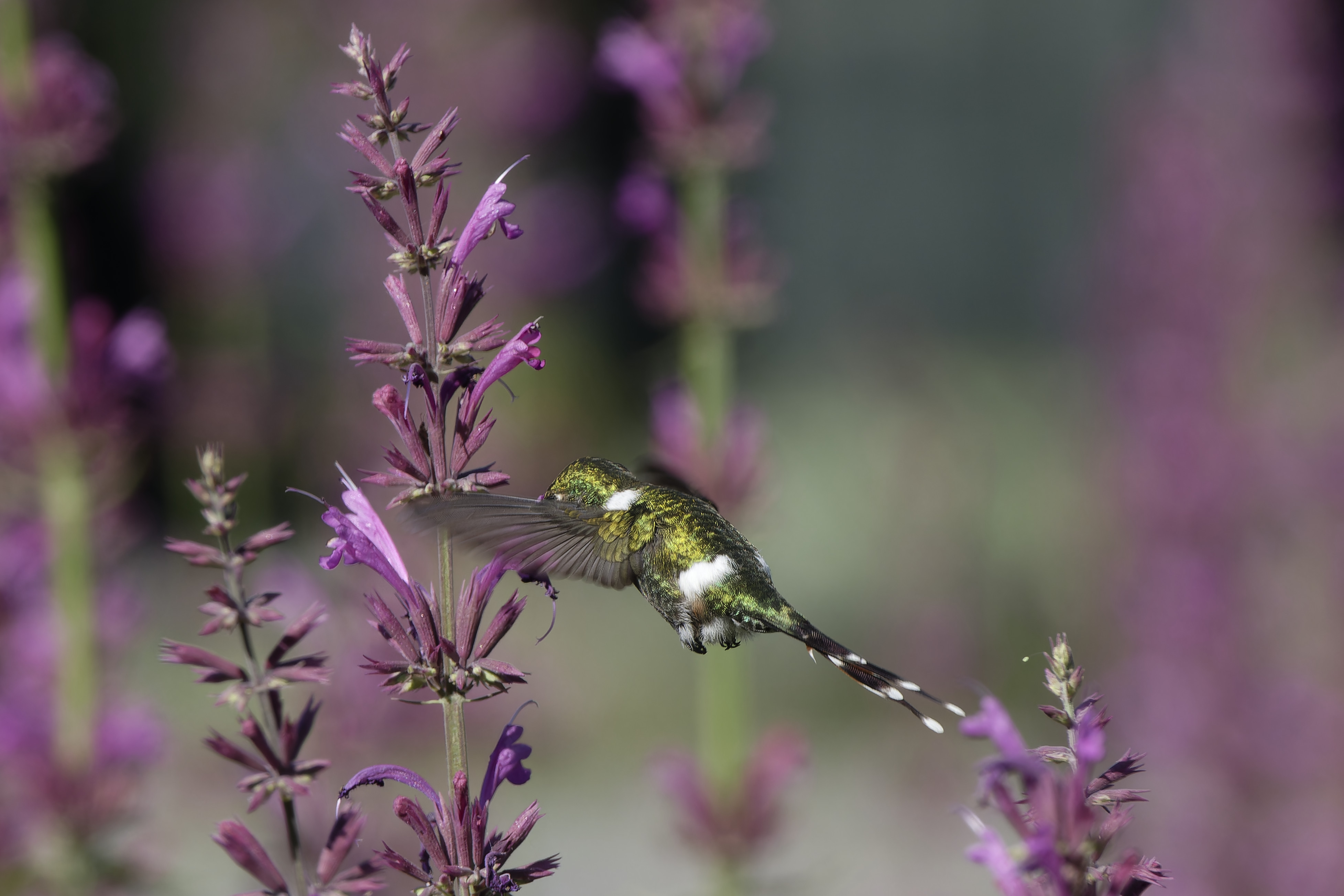
Male showing the much longer, bifurcated tail.

Male sparkling-tailed woodstars are 8.2 to 10.1 cm (3.2 to 4.0 in) long. Females are 5.8 to 7.5 cm (2.3 to 3.0 in) long. Twelve specimens weighed an average of 2.23 g (0.079 oz). Both sexes have a long, straight, black bill and a large white patch on each side of the rump. Males have metallic green upperparts, a grayish white breast, and dark metallic bronze green belly and flanks. Their gorget is metallic violet blue. The central two pairs of tail feathers are metallic bronze green. The outer three pairs are about four times as long as the inner pairs, giving a deeply forked tail. They are purplish black with white tips and the outer two pairs also have a chestnut band and a white band. The female has metallic bronze or bronze green upperparts and cinnamon underparts that are darker on the flanks and lower belly. The tail is only slightly forked. The central two pairs of feathers are metallic bronze green with black tips. The outer three pairs have bronze green bases, a wide black band near the tip, and pale cinnamon or white tips.

== Distribution and habitat ==
The sparkling-tailed woodstar is found discontinuously in Mexico from Sinaloa in the west and Veracruz in the east through Guatemala, El Salvador, and Honduras into northern Nicaragua. It inhabits semi-open landscapes such as the edges of pine-oak forest, bushy secondary forest, and scrubby woods. In elevation it generally ranges from 750 to 2,500 m (2,500 to 8,200 ft) though it occurs locally or seasonally almost down to sea level.

== Behavior ==
=== Movement ===
The sparkling-tailed woodstars movements are not well known; it possibly makes seasonal movements to lower elevations.

=== Feeding ===
The sparkling-tailed woodstar forages for nectar by trap-lining, visiting a circuit of flowering plants and trees. It seeks nectar at all levels of the vegetation with a slow, bee-like flight, and apparently feeds at a wide variety of plants but details are lacking. In addition to nectar, it feeds on insects captured by hawking from a perch.

=== Breeding ===
Almost nothing is known about the sparkling-tailed woodstar's breeding phenology. Individuals collected in August in western Mexico were in breeding condition, so the breeding season apparently includes that month.

=== Vocalization ===
The sparkling-tailed woodstar's song is "a very high, thin, but musical squeaking in a continuous stream, rising and falling slightly and lasting for many seconds at a time." It is sung from a high exposed perch. It also occasionally gives "high, sharp, twittering chirps".

== Status ==
The IUCN has assessed the sparkling-tailed woodstar as being of Least Concern. It has a large range, and though its population size is not known it is believed to be stable. However, Mexican authorities consider it threatened because of its scattered distribution in the country and the pressures on its habitat.
