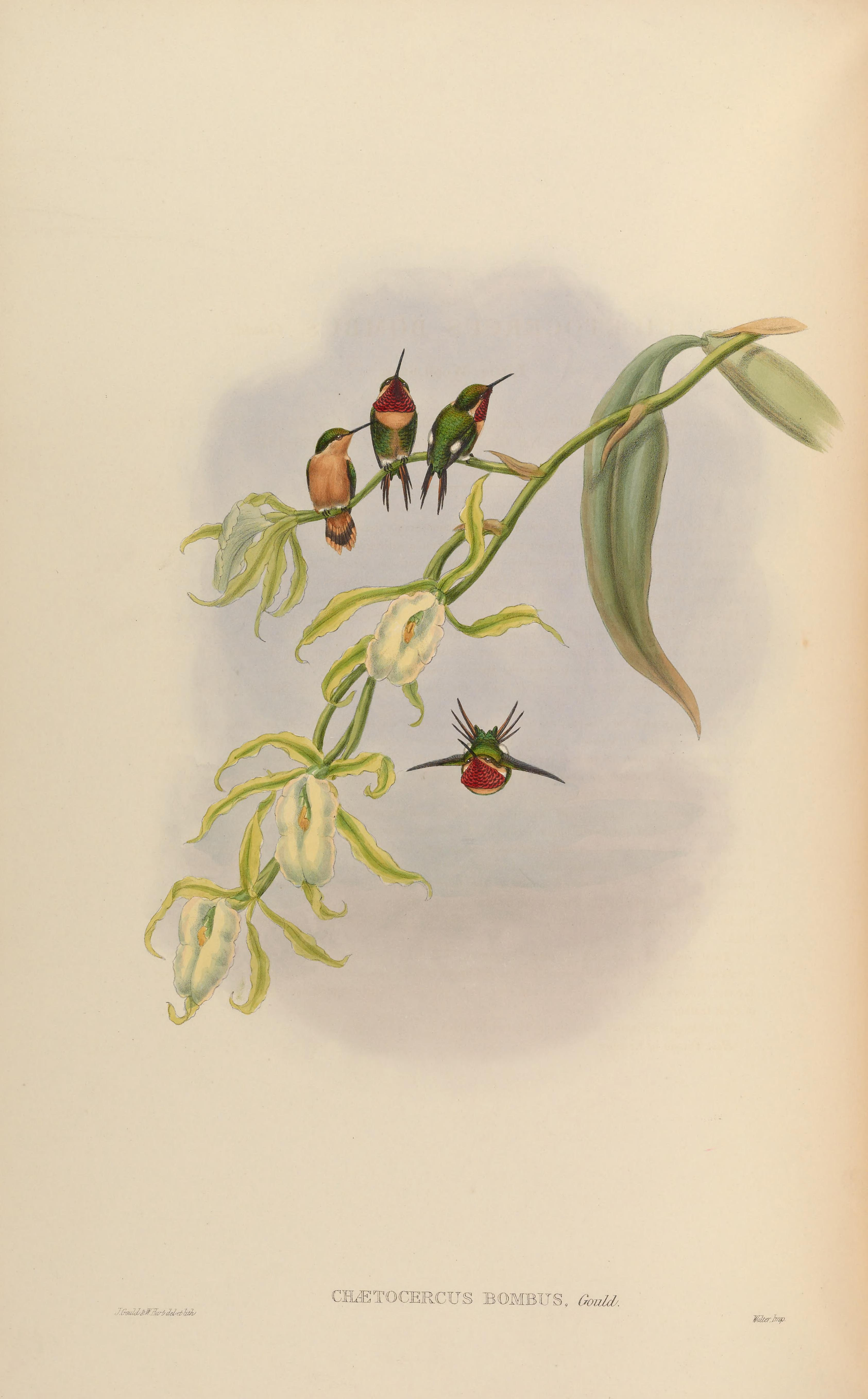

Conservation status
- Near Threatened (IUCN 3.1)
- CITES Appendix II

Scientific classification
- Kingdom: Animalia
- Phylum: Chordata
- Class: Aves
- Order: Apodiformes
- Family: Trochilidae
- Genus: Chaetocercus
- Species: C. bombus

Binomial name
- Chaetocercus bombus Gould, 1871

Synonyms
- Acestrura bombus

= Little woodstar =

Species of hummingbird

The little woodstar (Chaetocercus bombus), called estrellita chica in South America, is a Near Threatened species of hummingbird in tribe Mellisugini of subfamily Trochilinae, the "bee hummingbirds". It is found in Colombia, Ecuador and Peru.

== Taxonomy and systematics ==
The little woodstar and several other species in genus Chaetocercus were formerly placed in genus Acestrura but have been in their current position since the late 20th century. The species is monotypic.

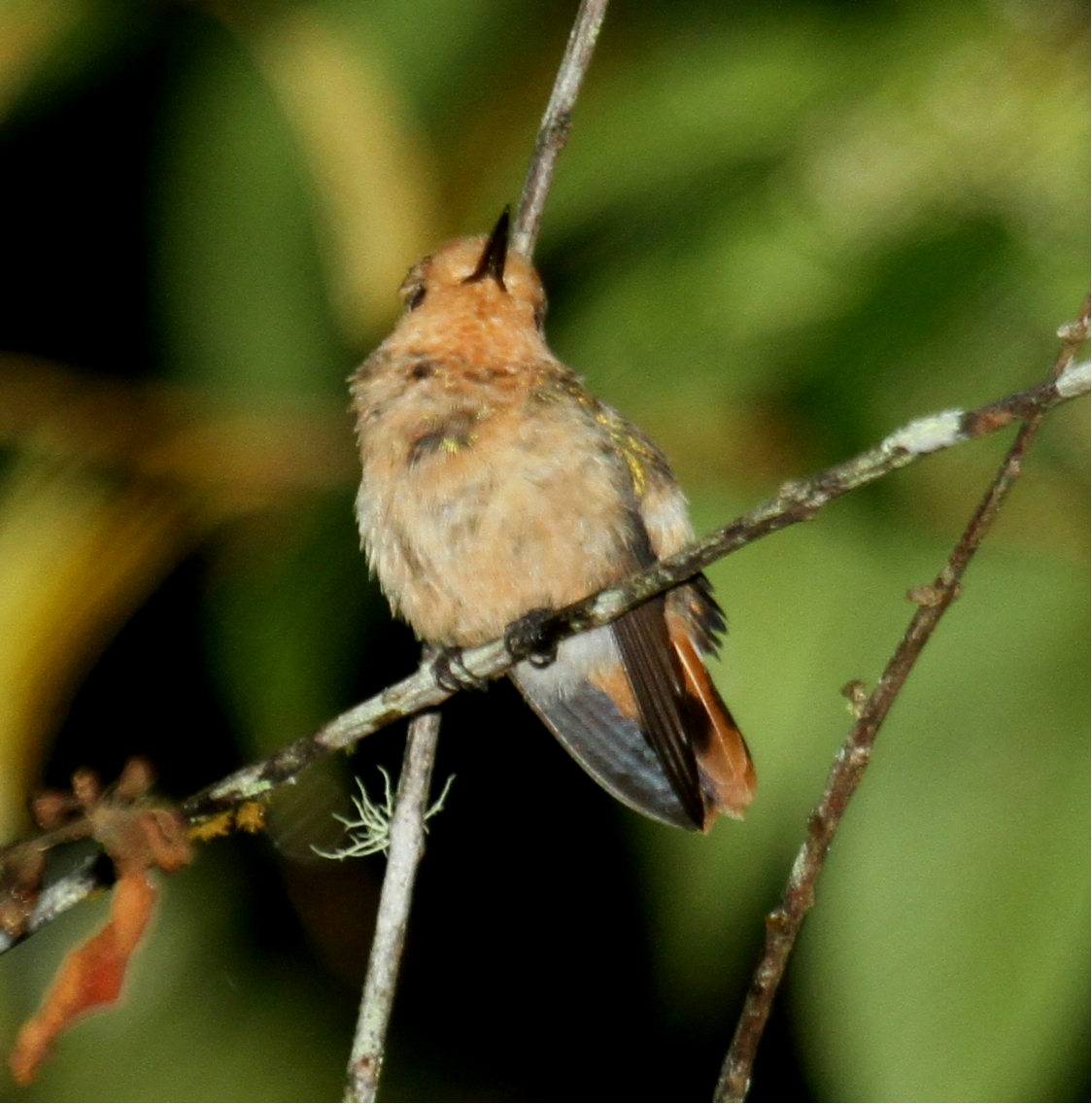
Female at Copalinga Lodge, Ecuador

== Description ==
The little woodstar is 6 to 7 cm (2.4 to 2.8 in) long. Both sexes have a straightish black bill. The male is mostly dark bronzy blue-green. It has a buffy white line behind the eye that curves down to meet the buffy chest. Its gorget is rosy. The tail is forked and its outermost feathers are shafts with no vanes. The female is bronzy green above and mostly cinnamon below with tawny flanks and vent. The tail is rounded and tawny with a black bar near the end.

== Distribution and habitat ==
The little woodstar is found from extreme southwestern Colombia through western Ecuador into northern Peru and discontinuously in eastern Ecuador and north central Peru. It inhabits the transition zone between semi-humid and humid deciduous forest. In elevation it ranges from sea level to 2,300 m (7,500 ft) in western Ecuador and between 900 and 3,000 m (3,000 and 9,800 ft) in eastern Ecuador and Peru.

== Behavior ==
=== Movement ===
The little woodstar is presumed to be mostly sedentary but seasonal elevational movements are likely.

=== Feeding ===
The little woodstar forages from near the ground to the forest's middle level, visiting a wide variety of flowering plants and trees. Little is known about its foraging strategy but it is assumed to behave like its close relative the white-bellied woodstar (C. muslant). That species does not defend feeding territories, and because of its small size and slow bumblebee-like flight is able to feed in the territories of other hummingbirds.

=== Breeding ===
Nothing is known about the little woodstar's breeding phenology.

=== Vocalization ===
What is thought to be the little woodstar's song is "a mixture of chips, twitters and buzzy notes, 'tsitsitsi..tzzeee-tzzeee..chichip'." It makes "a single dry 'chip' or doubled 'chichip'" while feeding and hovering and "a squeaky 'kswee-kswee-ti-ti-ti'" while interacting with other hummingbirds.

== Status ==
The IUCN originally assessed the little woodstar as Threatened and reclassified it as Endangered in 1994. In 2000 it was declared Vulnerable and in 2021 Near Threatened. It has a somewhat limited range and is patchily distributed in it. Its population is estimated at 5000 to 20,000 mature individuals and is believed to be decreasing. It is threatened by continuing loss of forest habitat to logging, agriculture, settlements, and mining.
