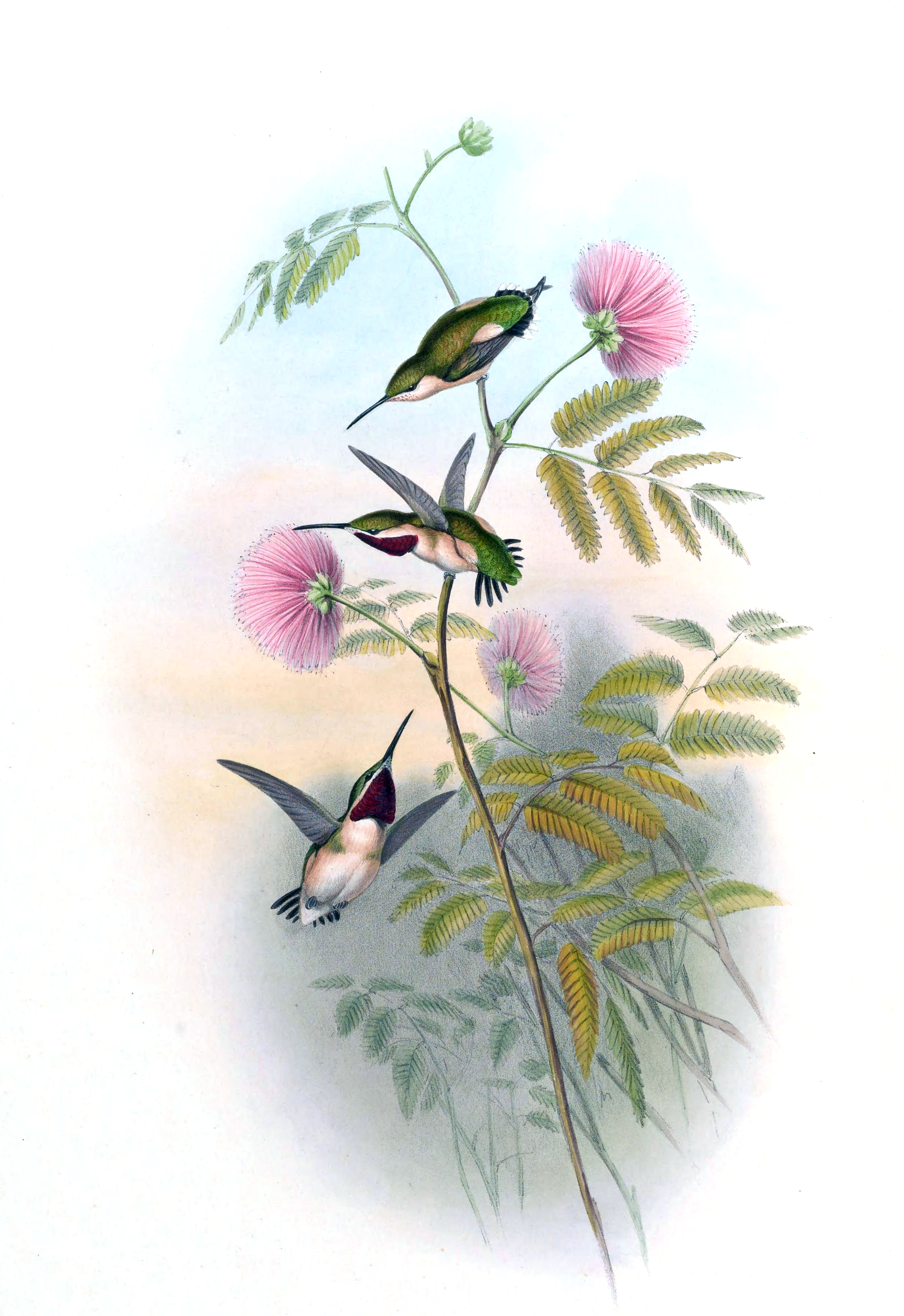

Conservation status
- Least Concern (IUCN 3.1)
- CITES Appendix II

Scientific classification
- Kingdom: Animalia
- Phylum: Chordata
- Class: Aves
- Order: Apodiformes
- Family: Trochilidae
- Subfamily: Trochilinae
- Tribe: Mellisugini
- Genus: Myrmia; Mulsant, 1876
- Species: M. micrura

Binomial name
- Myrmia micrura (Gould, 1854)

Synonyms
- Calothorax micrurus

Audio

= Short-tailed woodstar =

Species of hummingbird

The short-tailed woodstar (Myrmia micrura) is a species of hummingbird in tribe Mellisugini of subfamily Trochilinae, the "bee hummingbirds". It is the only species placed in the genus Myrmia. It is found in Ecuador and Peru.

== Taxonomy and systematics ==
The short-tailed woodstar was originally placed in genus Calothorax but since approximately 1876 has been placed in its current myrmia. It is the only species in its genus and has no subspecies.

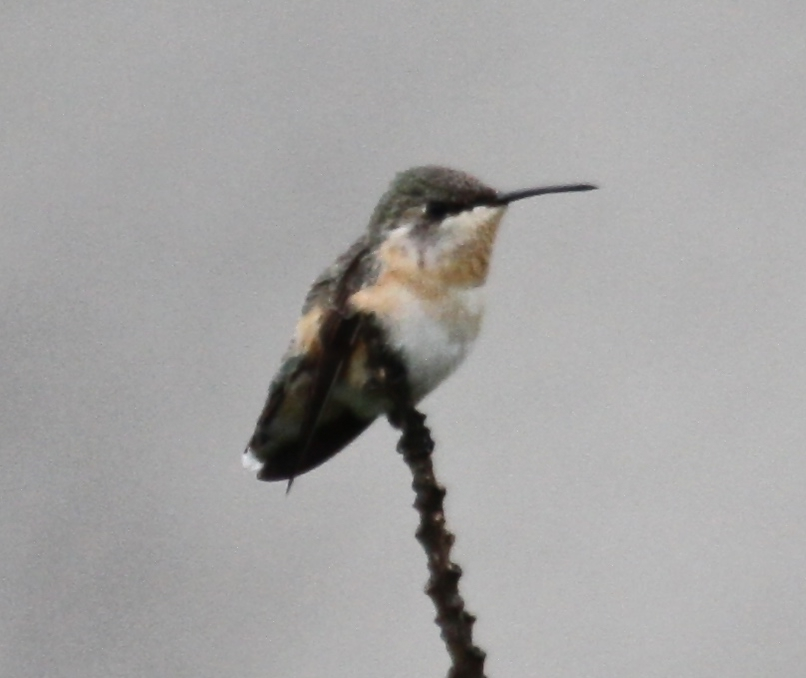
female bird

== Description ==
The short-tailed woodstar is about 6 cm (2.4 in) long and weighs about 2.3 g (0.081 oz). It and the gorgeted woodstar (Chaetocercus heliodor) are the smallest birds in South America, though the little woodstar (C. bombus) is only slightly longer. It has a very short, slightly decurved, black bill. Both sexes have shining green upperparts. Males have a white stripe from the bill to below the eye. Their gorget is glittering violet and the breast white with dingy flanks. Their very short tail's central feathers are green and the rest blackish. Females lack the bright gorget; their underparts are pale buffy whitish to cinnamon buff. Their tail is like the male's with the addition of white tips on the outer feathers.

== Distribution and habitat ==
The short-tailed woodstar is found from the southern part of Ecuador's Manabí Province south into Peru as far as northern La Libertad Department. It inhabits arid scrub, shrublands, and gardens. It is mostly a bird of the lowlands. In Ecuador it usually occurs below 200 m (660 ft), though in Loja Province it can be found as high as 800 m (2,600 ft). Similarly, in Peru it is usually found within a few hundred meters of sea level but occurs locally as high as 1,200 m (3,900 ft).

== Behavior ==
=== Movement ===
The short-tailed woodstar is a year-round resident in most of its range but seems to leave the immediate coastal areas in the rainy season.

=== Feeding ===
The short-tailed woodstar forages for nectar at all heights but most often feeds close to the ground. It also eats small arthropods. Details of its diet are lacking, but it has been recorded feeding at flowers of families Malvaceae and Fabaceae. It is often attracted to flowers planted around houses.

=== Breeding ===
Almost everything that is known about the short-tailed woodstar's breeding phenology comes from observations in southwestern Ecuador, where the breeding season is mostly from March to May. Males make a U-shaped courtship flight. Females build a cup nest of plant down and spiderweb in a fork of a thin branch. It is typically 0.6 to 2.6 m (2 to 9 ft) above the ground. The female incubates the clutch of two eggs for 15 to 16 days and fledging occurs 22 to 23 days after hatch.

=== Vocalization ===
The male short-tailed woodstar's song, given during the display flight, is "a sweet, high series of tititi notes interspersed with a high sweee." The species' call is a "thin tchi-tchi-tchi."

== Conservation status ==
The IUCN has assessed the short-tailed woodstar as being of Least Concern. It has a fairly large range, and though its population size is not known, it is believed to be stable. It is considered fairly common to common in Ecuador and uncommon to fairly common in Peru. "At least in the short term, [it] seems to be little affected by human activities"
