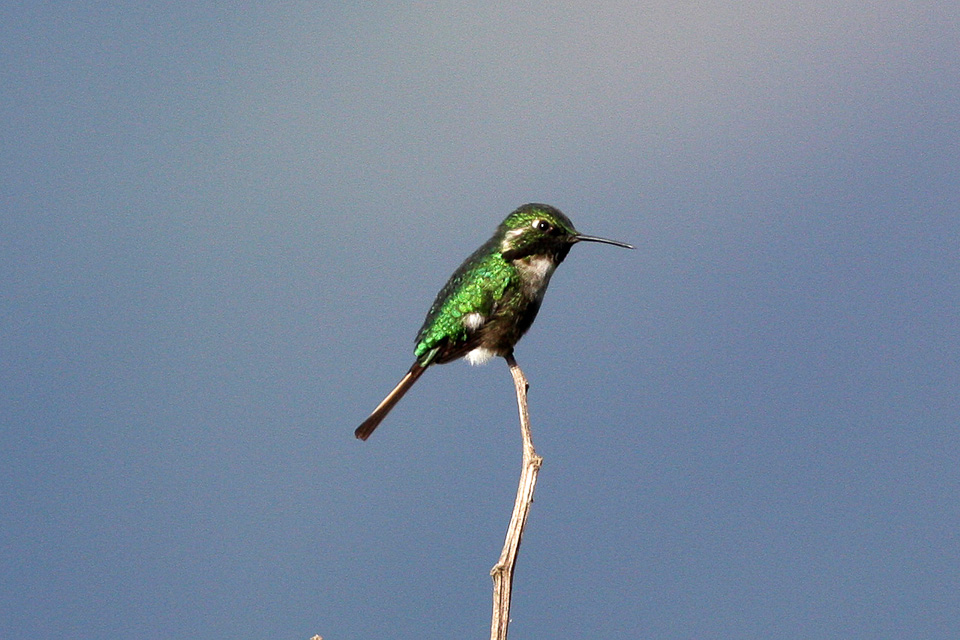

Conservation status
- Least Concern (IUCN 3.1)
- CITES Appendix II

Scientific classification
- Kingdom: Animalia
- Phylum: Chordata
- Class: Aves
- Order: Apodiformes
- Family: Trochilidae
- Tribe: Mellisugini
- Genus: Microstilbon; Todd, 1913
- Species: M. burmeisteri

Binomial name
- Microstilbon burmeisteri (Sclater, PL, 1888)

= Slender-tailed woodstar =

Species of hummingbird

The slender-tailed woodstar (Microstilbon burmeisteri) is a species of hummingbird in tribe Mellisugini of subfamily Trochilinae, the "bee hummingbirds". It is the only species placed in the genus Microstilbon. It is found in Argentina and Bolivia.

== Taxonomy and systematics ==
The slender-tailed woodstar was at one time placed in genus Chaetocercus but was restored to genus Microstilbon by the mid 20th century. The species is the only one in its genus and has no subspecies.

== Description ==
The slender-tailed woodstar is 7 to 9 cm (2.8 to 3.5 in) long including its 3 cm (1.2 in) tail. Both sexes have a short, straight, black bill, bronzy green upperparts, and a thin white stripe behind the eye. Males have a reddish purple gorget that flares to the side as "moustache" tufts. The rest of the throat is white, the underparts pale grayish with green mottling on the sides, and the undertail coverts are pale cinnamon. The very narrow forked tail is black. Females have darker cheeks than the male. They do not have the colorful gorget; their underparts are cinnamon-buff. Their central tail feathers are green and the rest cinnamon with a black band near the end.

== Distribution and habitat ==
The slender-tailed woodstar is found from Bolivia's Cochabamba and Santa Cruz departments south into Argentina's Jujuy, Salta, and Tucumán provinces. There is one historical record from the more northern La Paz, Bolivia area. It inhabits deciduous woodland, shrubby areas, thorn scrub, and densely vegetated ravines. In elevation it ranges between 1,100 and 2,600 m (3,600 and 8,500 ft).

== Behavior ==
=== Movement ===
Though details are lacking, the slender-tailed woodstar is strongly suspected of making seasonal elevational movements and might even be an austral migrant.

=== Feeding ===
The slender-tailed woodstar forages fairly high in the vegetation, where its fast wingbeats resemble a bumblebee's. Other hummingbirds dominate it. It has been recorded feeding on nectar from epiphyte flowers and is assumed to feed on nectar at other types of plants and to eat insects.

=== Breeding ===
The few records of slender-tailed woodstar nests suggest a breeding season that includes December and January. One nest was a cup made of soft plant fibers covered with lichens, attached to a tree branch with spiderweb about 6 m (20 ft) above the ground. The incubation length and time to fledging are not known.

=== Vocalization ===
Few of the slender-tailed woodstar's vocalizations are known. It does make "a series of dull 'chip' notes" while feeding and hovering.

== Status ==
The IUCN has assessed the slender-tailed woodstar as being of Least Concern. Though its population size is unknown, it is believed to be stable. It is considered fairly common, though hard to observe because it is so small and secretive. It is thought to accept human-made habitats to some extent. It is found in at least one protected area in Argentina.
