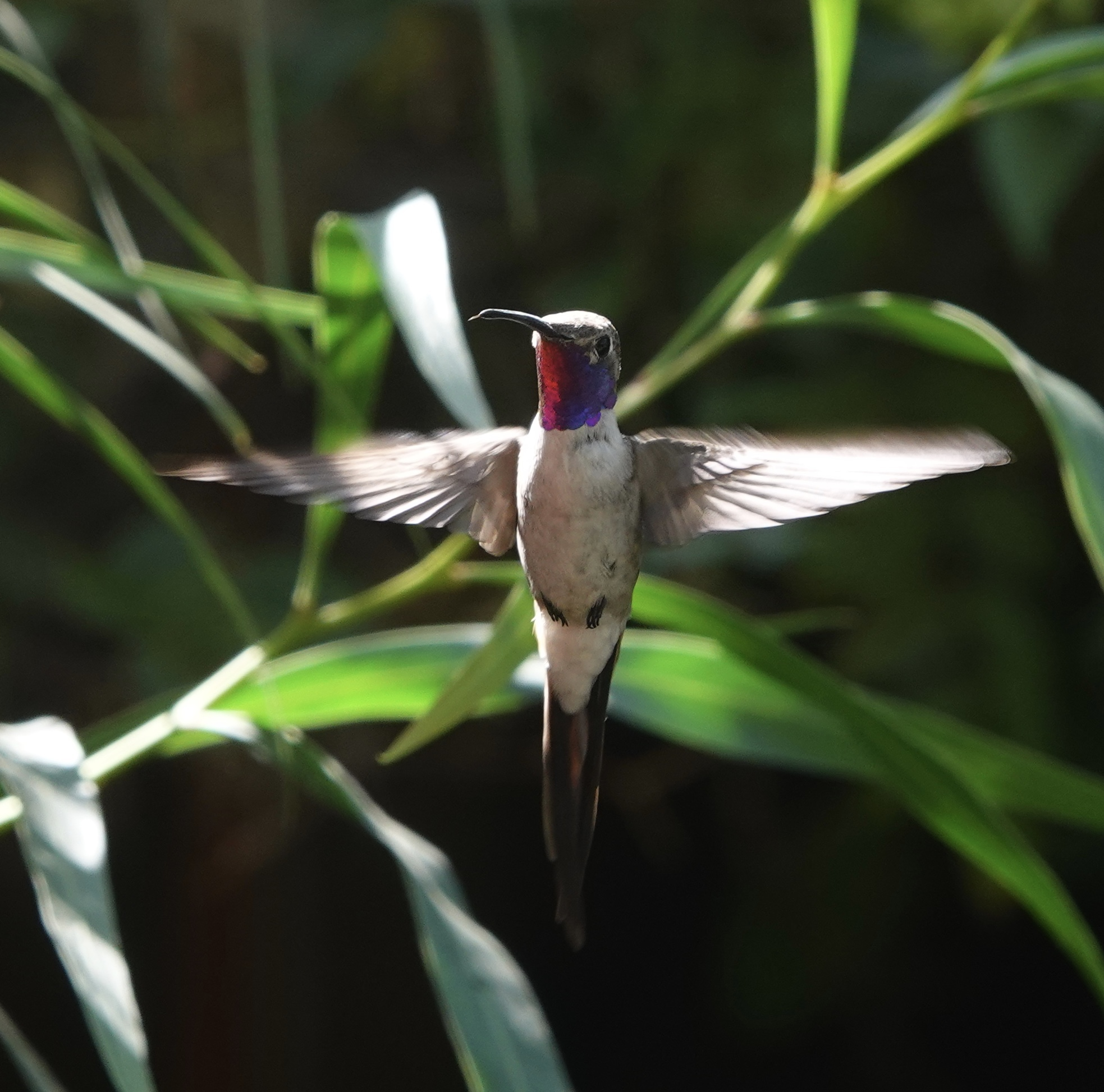

Conservation status
- Least Concern (IUCN 3.1)
- CITES Appendix II

Scientific classification
- Kingdom: Animalia
- Phylum: Chordata
- Class: Aves
- Clade: Strisores
- Order: Apodiformes
- Family: Trochilidae
- Tribe: Mellisugini
- Genus: Rhodopis; Reichenbach, 1854
- Species: R. vesper

Binomial name
- Rhodopis vesper (Lesson, 1829)
- In green, The distribution of this species.

= Oasis hummingbird =

Species of bird

The oasis hummingbird (Rhodopis vesper) is a species of hummingbird in tribe Mellisugini of subfamily Trochilinae, the "bee hummingbirds". It is the only species placed in the genus Rhodopis. It is found in Chile and Peru

== Taxonomy and systematics ==
The oasis hummingbird has three subspecies, the nominate R. v. vesper, R. v. koepckeae, and R. v. atacamensis. The last was at one time treated as a separate species, but since the mid twentieth century has had its current status.

== Description ==
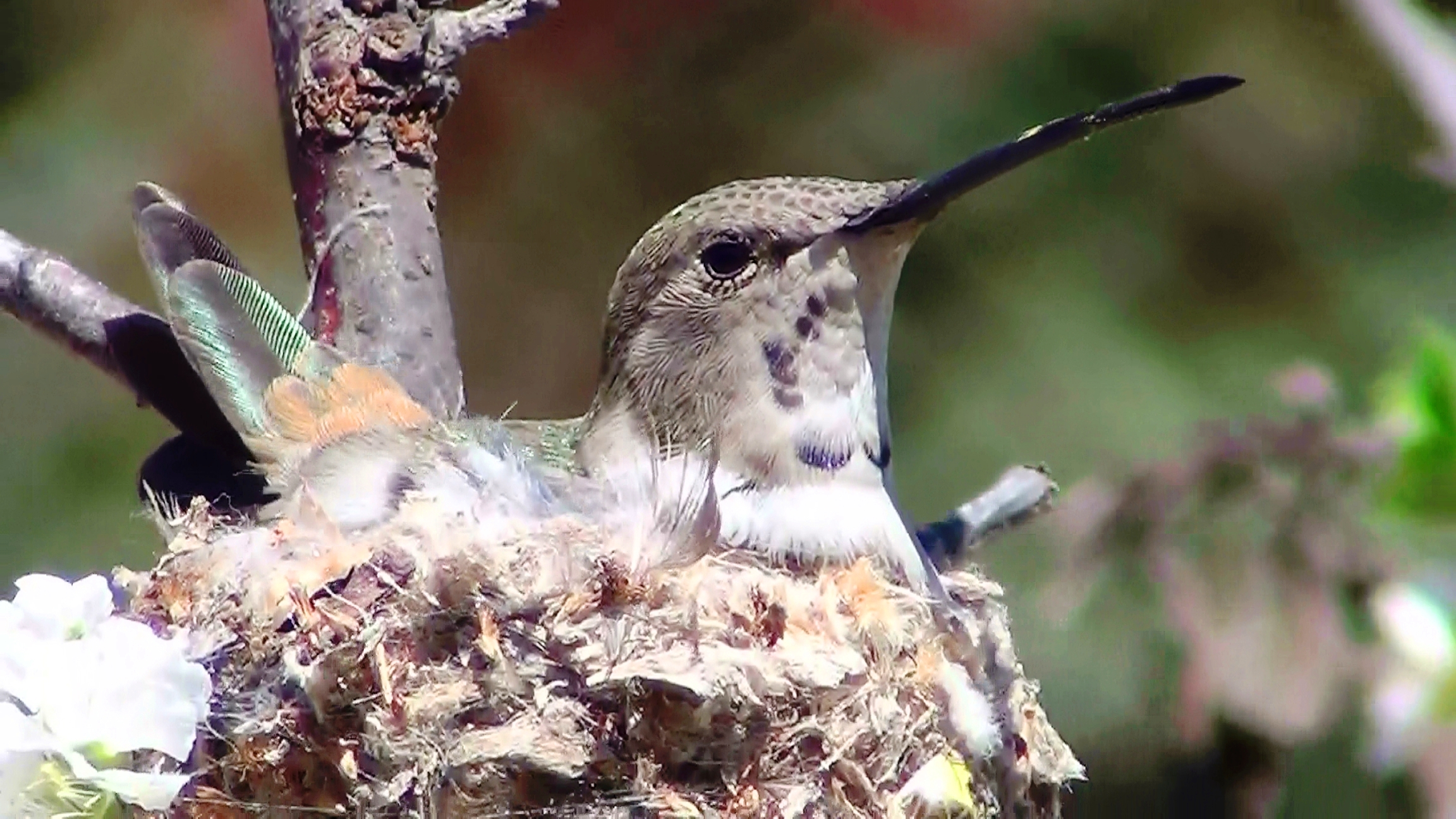
A female incubating.

The oasis hummingbird is 11 to 13.5 cm (4.3 to 5.3 in) long and weighs about 4 g (0.14 oz). Both sexes have a long, black, decurved bill. The nominate subspecies is larger and has a longer and stouter bill than the other two, but the three are otherwise alike. Both sexes have olive green upperparts with a cinnamon rump and uppertail coverts. Females have a small white dot behind the eye and males a longer white stripe. Males have an iridescent gorget that ranges from rosy violet to purple with turquoise to the rear. Their underparts are dull white with a dull green wash on the flanks. The tail is deeply forked; its central feathers are grayish olive and the rest purplish brown. Females do not have the colorful gorget; their underparts are pale gray to pale buff with darker flanks. Their tail is shorter than the male's and only slightly forked. The tail's upper surface is olive green to bronzy green and all but the central pair of feathers have a wide black bar near the end and white tips.

== Distribution and habitat ==
Subspecies R. v. koepckeae of the oasis hummingbird is known only from its type locality in northwestern Peru's Department of Piura. The nominate R. v. vesper is found from just south of there through Peru into Chile's Tarapacá Region. R. v. atacamensis is found further south in Chile between the Atacama and Santiago Metropolitan regions. Their range expansion south of Atacama has occurred since the 1960s. The species inhabits a variety of coastal and near-coastal landscapes including arid scrublands and their oases, riparian zones, agricultural areas, and gardens. In elevation it ranges from near sea level to 3,800 m (12,500 ft) but in most of Peru it is mostly found below 2,600 m (8,500 ft).

== Behavior ==
=== Movement ===
The oasis hummingbird is not known to migrate or make other large-scale movements, but because it has colonized isolated oases and valleys it must make at least exploratory movements. It might also make seasonal elevational changes.

=== Feeding ===
The oasis hummingbird forages for nectar at all heights of vegetation and also eats small arthropods, but details of its diet are lacking.

=== Breeding ===
Male oasis hummingbirds are territorial, at least to others of its species. They perform various courtship displays in order to attract mates. In a U-shaped shuttle display, they hover about 10 to 15 cm (3.9 to 5.9 in) in front of a female, sing, flare their bright gorget, and move up, down, left and right in an attempt to impress the potential mate. They spread their tail feathers while doing this and wave them side to side. During normal flight, they beat their wings constantly at a fairly regular frequency. High speed video has shown that while performing their shuttle display, the males actually stop fluttering for just a fraction of a second to tuck their wings away causing them to descend slightly before recommencing their wing beating. This makes them appear to bound in place. They also have a dive display where they will soar into the air and swoop down by the females while making a sharp whistling sound with their tail feathers.

Little else is known about the oasis hummingbird's breeding phenology. It possibly nests throughout the year, though nests with eggs are known in Chile only between September and December. The cup nest is suspended from a tree or shrub branch. The clutch size is two eggs. Captive females have incubated the eggs for about 16 days, and fledging occurred about 27 days after hatch.

=== Vocalization ===
The oasis hummingbird's vocalizations have not been extensively recorded. What appears to be its song is "tzee-tzee-dee-dee, first ascending, then descending". Calls include a "melodious series of tick and tzee notes given at variable speeds and tone", "a rapid, thin liquid chatter", and ""a rich chew note".

== Status ==
The IUCN has assessed the oasis hummingbird as being of Least Concern. It has a large range, and though its population size is not known, it is believed to be stable. Its range and habitat have supported humans for millennia, so "at least in the short term [the species] seems to be little affected by human activities."
