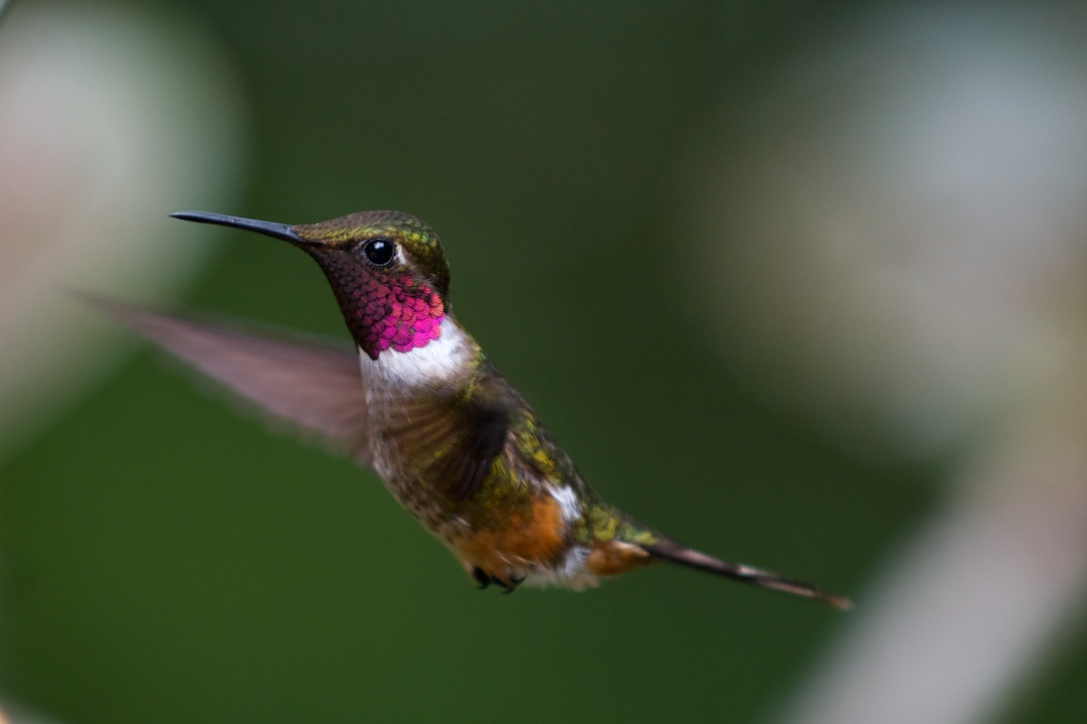
- Magenta-throated woodstar (P. bryantae)

Scientific classification
- Kingdom: Animalia
- Phylum: Chordata
- Class: Aves
- Order: Apodiformes
- Family: Trochilidae
- Tribe: Mellisugini
- Genus: Philodice; Mulsant, Verreaux, J & Verreaux, É, 1866

Type species
- Trochilus mitchellii (purple-throated woodstar) Bourcier, 1847

Species
- Philodice bryantae Philodice mitchelli

= Philodice (bird) =

Genus of hummingbirds

Philodice is a genus of hummingbirds in the tribe Mellisugini and family Trochilidae.

== Taxonomy ==
The genus Philodice was introduced in 1866 by the French ornithologists Étienne Mulsant, Jules Verreaux and Édouard Verreaux to accommodate a single species, the purple-throated woodstar, which is therefore the type species. The genus name comes from Greek mythology, Pholodice was the wife of Leucippus and daughter of Inachus.

The genus now contains two species that were formerly assigned to Calliphlox. They were placed in the resurrected genus Philodice based on a molecular phylogenetic study that was published in 2017.

The two species are:

Genus Philodice – Bourcier, 1847 – two species
| Common name | Scientific name and subspecies | Range | Size and ecology | IUCN status and estimated population |
|---|---|---|---|---|
| Magenta-throated woodstar Male Female | Philodice bryantae (Lawrence, 1867) | Costa Rica and Panama | Size: Habitat: Diet: | LC |
| Purple-throated woodstar Male Female | Philodice mitchellii (Bourcier, 1847) | Colombia and Ecuador, and a minor localized population in Panama | Size: Habitat: Diet: | LC |
