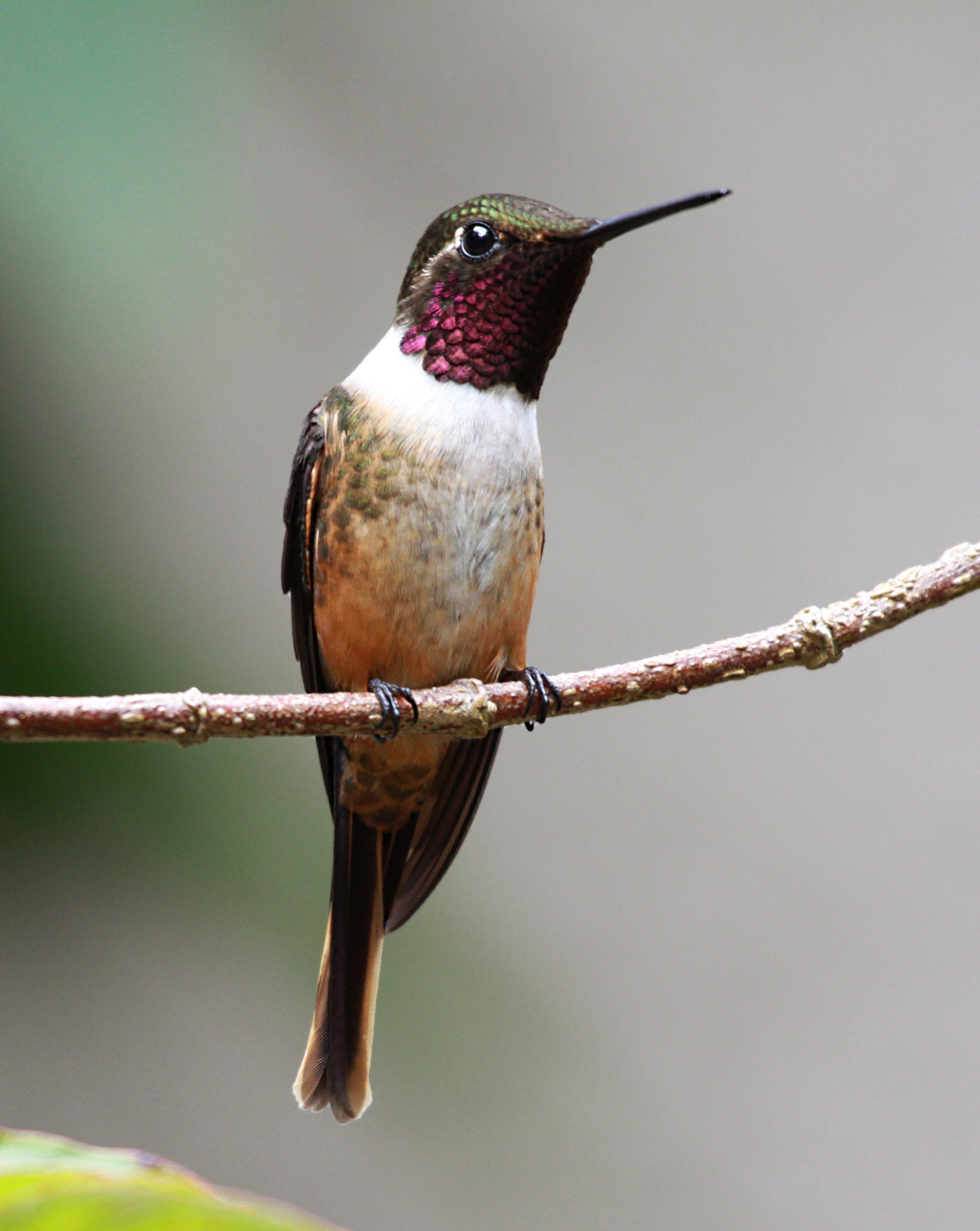
- Male in Costa Rica
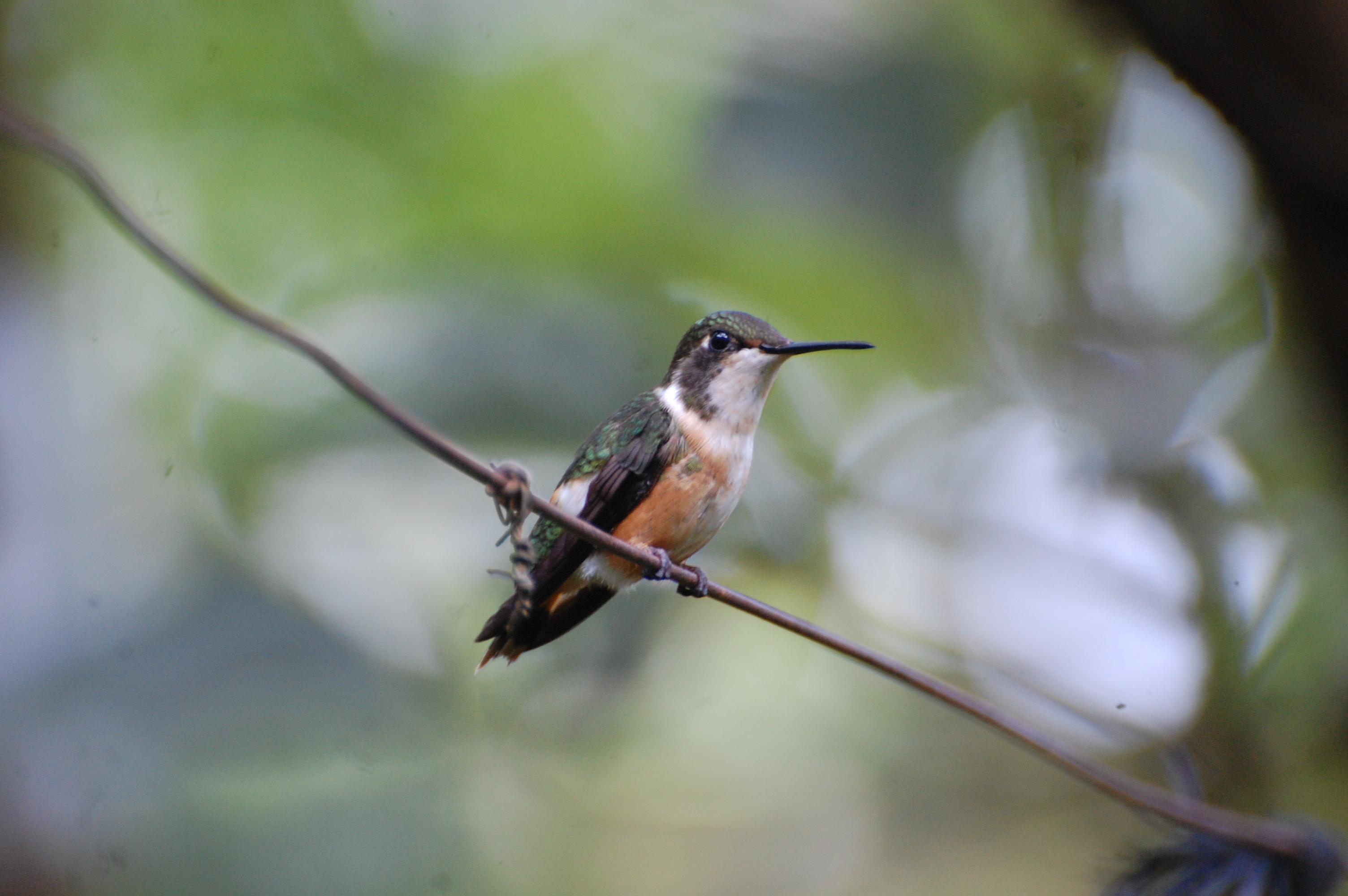
- Female

Conservation status
- Least Concern (IUCN 3.1)
- CITES Appendix II

Scientific classification
- Kingdom: Animalia
- Phylum: Chordata
- Class: Aves
- Clade: Strisores
- Order: Apodiformes
- Family: Trochilidae
- Genus: Philodice
- Species: P. bryantae

Binomial name
- Philodice bryantae (Lawrence, 1867)
- Range of P. bryantae

Synonyms
- Calliphlox bryantae

= Magenta-throated woodstar =

Species of hummingbird

The magenta-throated woodstar (Philodice bryantae) is a species of hummingbird in tribe Mellisugini of subfamily Trochilinae, the "bee hummingbirds". It is found in Costa Rica and Panama.

== Taxonomy and systematics ==
The magenta-throated woodstar has in the past been included in genera Nesophlox and Calliphlox. The International Ornithological Committee (IOC) and the Clements taxonomy have moved it to genus Philodice which it shares with the purple-throated woodstar (P. mitchellii). However, the North American Classification Committee of the American Ornithological Society and BirdLife International's Handbook of the Birds of the World retain both of them in Calliphlox.

The magenta-throated woodstar is monotypic.

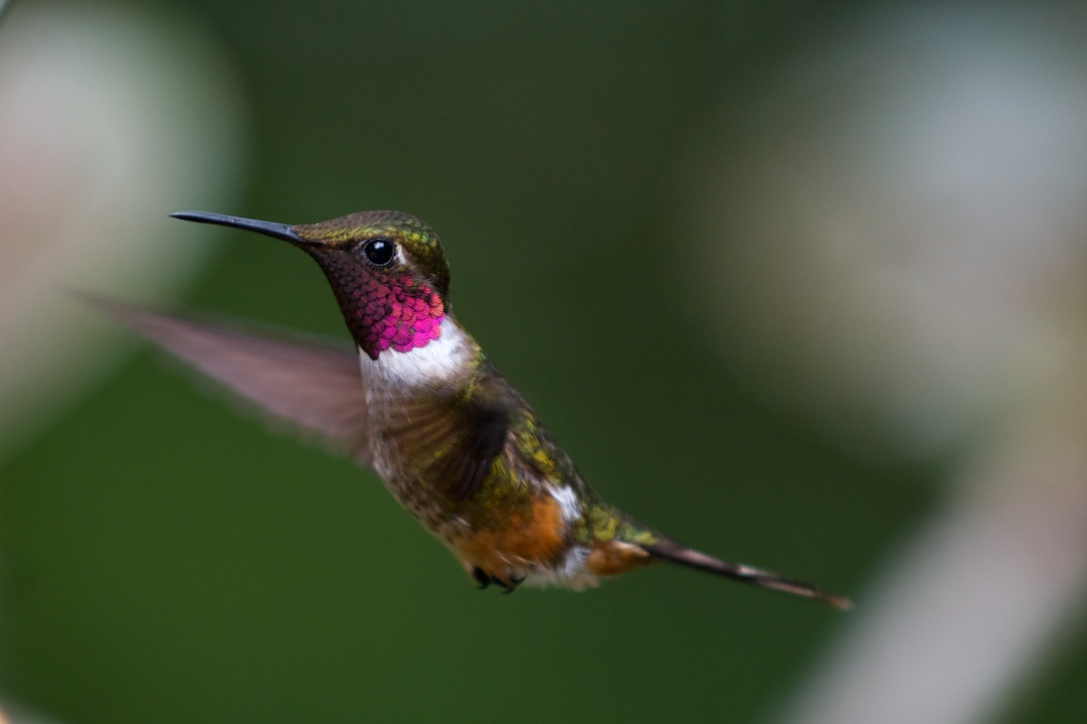
Male in flight

== Description ==
The male magenta-throated woodstar is about 9.0 cm (3.5 in) long and weighs about 3.3 g (0.12 oz). Females are about 7.5 cm (3.0 in) and weigh about 3.5 g (0.12 oz). Both sexes have a short, straight, black bill and a small white spot behind the eye. Both have bronzy green upperparts with some rufous spangles and a white band across the upper chest, though the male's is broader and brighter. Adult males have a metallic purple gorget, a green breast and flanks, and a rufous belly with a white or buffy patch on either side of the rump. Females have a buffy throat and a green breast and flanks with some rufous mixed in. The male's central tail feathers are short with black tips. Each pair outward from them are progressively longer; they are black with cinnamon-rufous inner webs. The adult female's central and outermost pairs of tail feathers are shorter than the intermediate ones, giving a "double rounded" look. The feathers are rufous with a black band near the end and buffy cinnamon tips. Immature birds are like the adult female, but paler below and with buff fringes on the upperparts plumage.

== Distribution and habitat ==
The magenta-throated woodstar is found from northern Coast Rica into western Panama as far as Veraguas Province. It mostly occurs on the Pacific slope. It inhabits semi-open to open landscapes in the Talamancan montane ecoregion; examples include forest edges and clearings, thinned woodland, secondary forest, and shrubby pastures. In elevation it ranges between 700 and 1,850 m (2,300 and 6,100 ft) in Costa Rica and in Panama occurs between 1,100 and 1,750 m (3,600 and 5,700 ft).

== Behavior ==
=== Movement ===
The magenta-throated woodstar apparently makes local movements because at some sites it is present only part of the year. The details, however, are lacking.

=== Feeding ===
The magenta-throated woodstar feeds on nectar from a variety of flowering plants, shrubs, and trees. Both sexes may attempt to defend feeding territories, leading to chasing and other agonistic behavior. The male usually holds his long tail cocked and closed while feeding but opens it wide when displaying aggressively. In addition to feeding on nectar the species captures small arthropods by hawking from a perch or gleaning from foliage.

=== Breeding ===
The magenta-throated woodstar's breeding season in Costa Rica spans from November to March or April but has not been defined in Panama. Males give a diving display flight alone or in loose groups (possibly at leks). The species' nest has not been described and the incubation period and time to fledging are unknown.

=== Vocalization ===
The magenta-throated woodstar's song is "a low-pitched, rapid medley of sputtering and gurgling notes." Their calls include "a low-pitched dry rolling 'drr'", "a dry 'cht'", and "a low-pitched, whistled 'tew'." The last is given during chases.

== Status ==
The IUCN originally assessed the magenta-throated woodstar as Near Threatened but since 2004 has rated it as being of Least Concern. It has a restricted range. Its population is estimated at between 20,000 and 50,000 mature individuals but is believed to be decreasing. It is considered locally common, at least seasonally, and appears able to tolerate some forest clearance.
