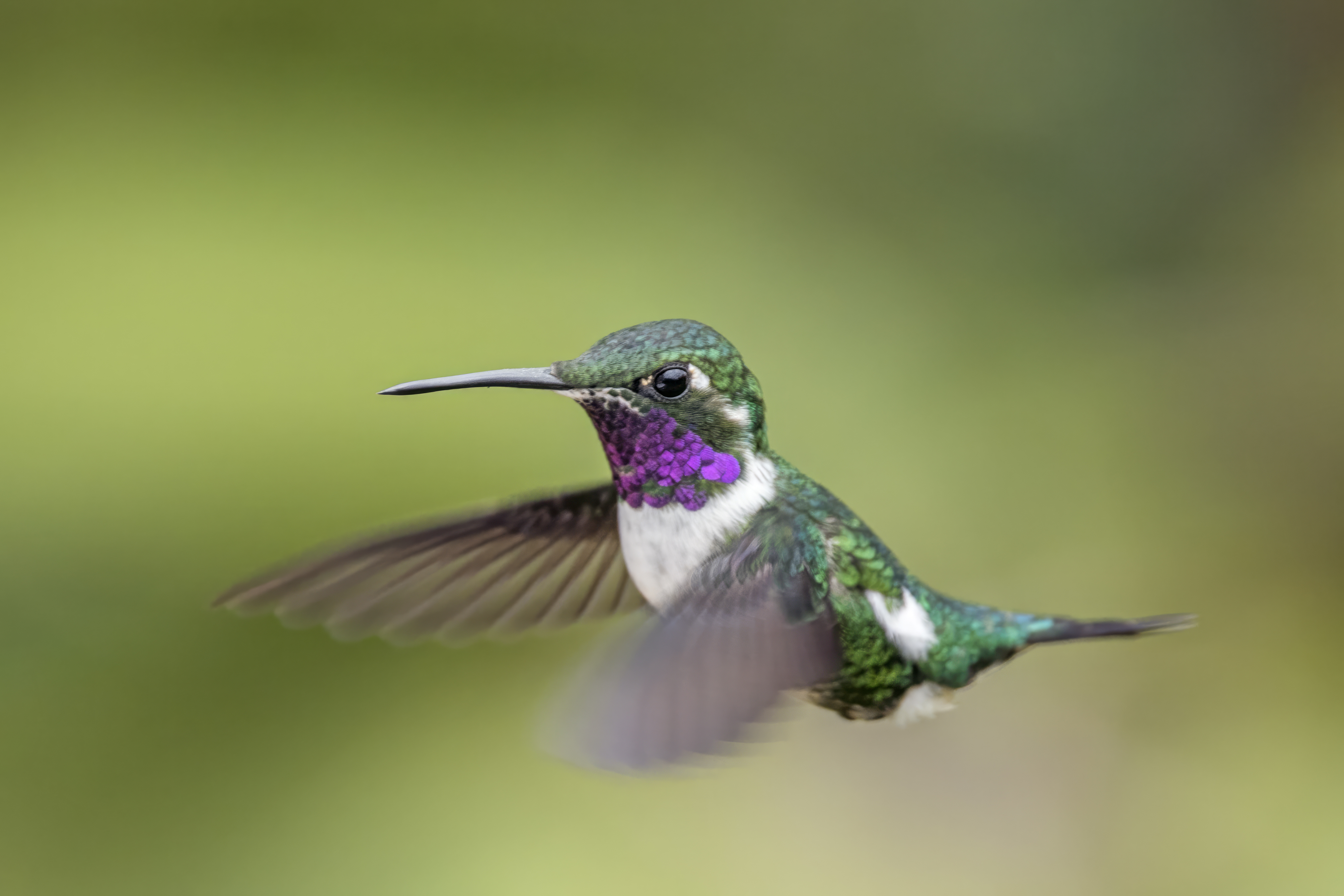
- Male, Chocó, Colombia
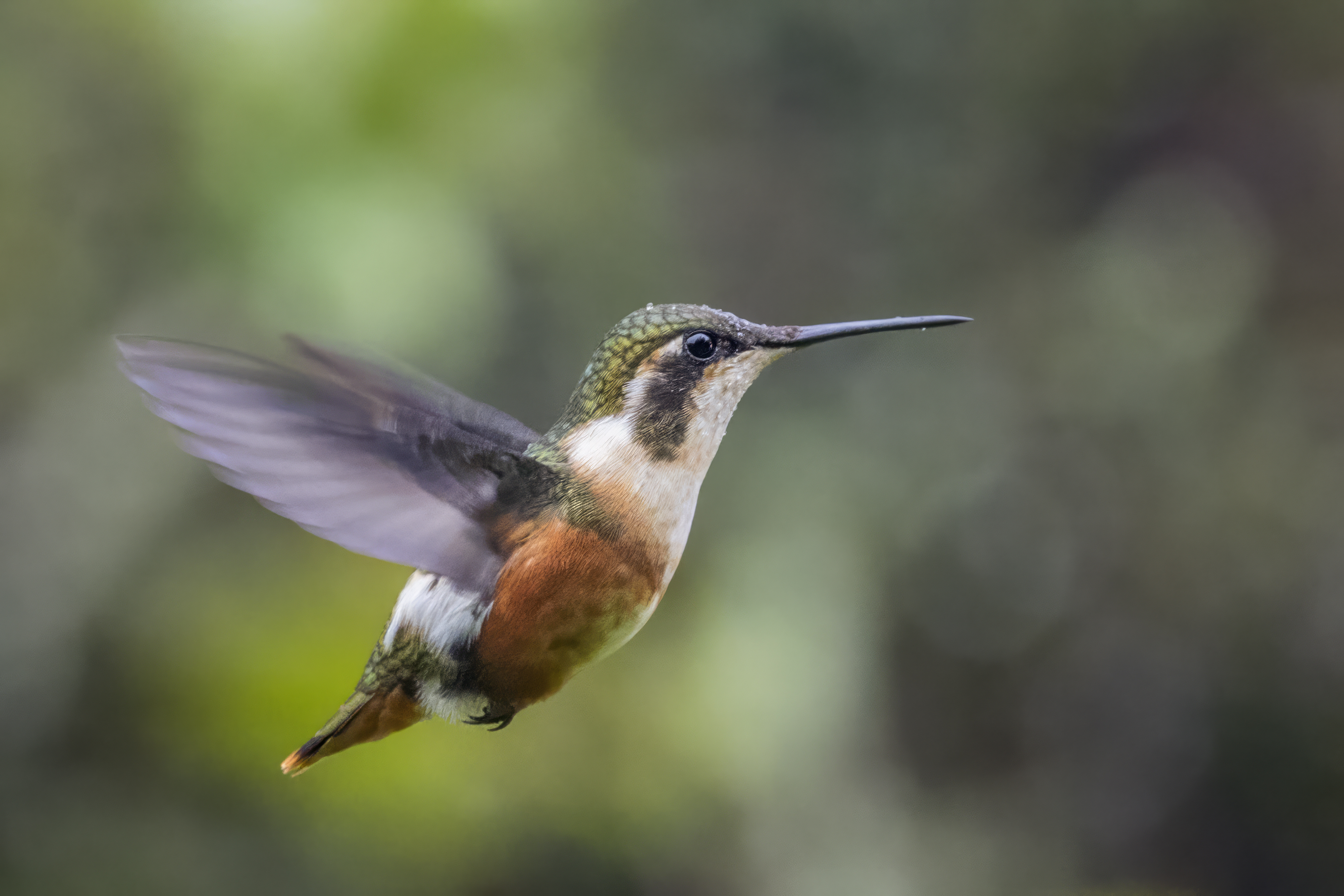
- Female, Cundinamarca, Colombia

Conservation status
- Least Concern (IUCN 3.1)
- CITES Appendix II

Scientific classification
- Kingdom: Animalia
- Phylum: Chordata
- Class: Aves
- Order: Apodiformes
- Family: Trochilidae
- Genus: Chaetocercus
- Species: C. mulsant

Binomial name
- Chaetocercus mulsant (Bourcier, 1843)

Synonyms
- Ornismya mulsanti Bourcier, 1843; Acestrura mulsant (Boursier, 1843)

= White-bellied woodstar =

Species of hummingbird

The white-bellied woodstar (Chaetocercus mulsant) is a species of hummingbird in tribe Mellisugini of subfamily Trochilinae, the "bee hummingbirds". It is found in Bolivia, Colombia, Ecuador, and Peru.

== Taxonomy and systematics ==
The white-bellied woodstar and several other species in genus Chaetocercus were formerly placed in genus Acestrura but have been in their current position since the late 20th century. The species is monotypic.

== Description ==
The white-bellied woodstar is about 8.5 cm (3.3 in) long and weighs about 3.8 to 4 g (0.13 to 0.14 oz). Both sexes have a straightish black bill. The male's upperparts are dark bluish green which continues onto the flanks. A downcurving white line behind the eye meets the white upper breast. Its gorget is iridescent reddish violet. The belly is white as are patches on the flanks. The forked tail is bluish green and its outermost feathers are shafts with no vanes. The female is bronzy green above. It has a grayish "mask" and a buff stripe behind the eye. Its throat is pale cinnamon, the belly white, and the flanks tawny. Its tail is rounded; the central feathers are green and the others cinnamon with a wide black band near the end.

== Distribution and habitat ==
The white-bellied woodstar is found from the Central and Eastern Andes of Colombia south discontinuously through Ecuador and Peru into Bolivia as far as Cochabamba Department. It inhabits the edges of humid forest, pastures, and cultivated areas. In elevation it is most common between 2,200 and 2,800 m (7,200 and 9,200 ft) but is regularly found as low as 1,500 m (4,900 ft) and there are reports as high as 4,000 m (13,000 ft).

== Behavior ==
=== Movement ===
The white-bellied woodstar is mainly sedentary though the records up to 4000 m suggest that it makes seasonal elevational movements.

=== Feeding ===
The white-bellied woodstar forages at all levels of vegetation, taking nectar from a variety of flowering plants and trees including Agave, Inga, and Lantana. It also eats small arthropods. It does not defend feeding territories, and because of its small size and slow bumblebee-like flight it is able to feed in the territories of other hummingbirds.

=== Breeding ===
Almost nothing is known about the white-bellied woodstar's breeding phenology. One nest was discovered in April in Ecuador; it was about 10 m (30 ft) up in tree.

=== Vocalization ===
The white-bellied woodstar's calls include "a rather low-pitched 'djup' note and [a] higher-pitched dull 'chip'."

== Status ==
The IUCN has assessed the white-bellied woodstar as being of Least Concern. It has a large range, and though its population size is not known it is believed to be stable. It is considered uncommon to locally common in various parts of its range and may be more common than thought because it is easy to overlook. It appears to adapt to human-made landscapes.
