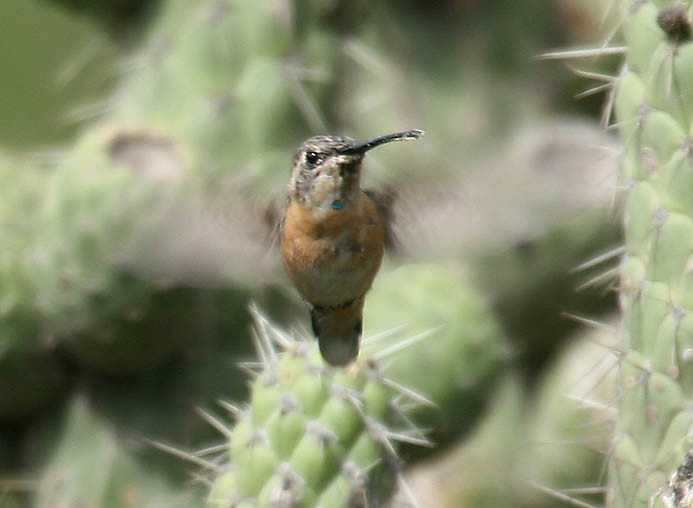

Conservation status
- Least Concern (IUCN 3.1)
- CITES Appendix II

Scientific classification
- Kingdom: Animalia
- Phylum: Chordata
- Class: Aves
- Order: Apodiformes
- Family: Trochilidae
- Tribe: Mellisugini
- Genus: Myrtis; Reichenbach, 1854
- Species: M. fanny

Binomial name
- Myrtis fanny (Lesson, 1838)
- Distribution of Myrtis fanny

= Purple-collared woodstar =

Species of hummingbird

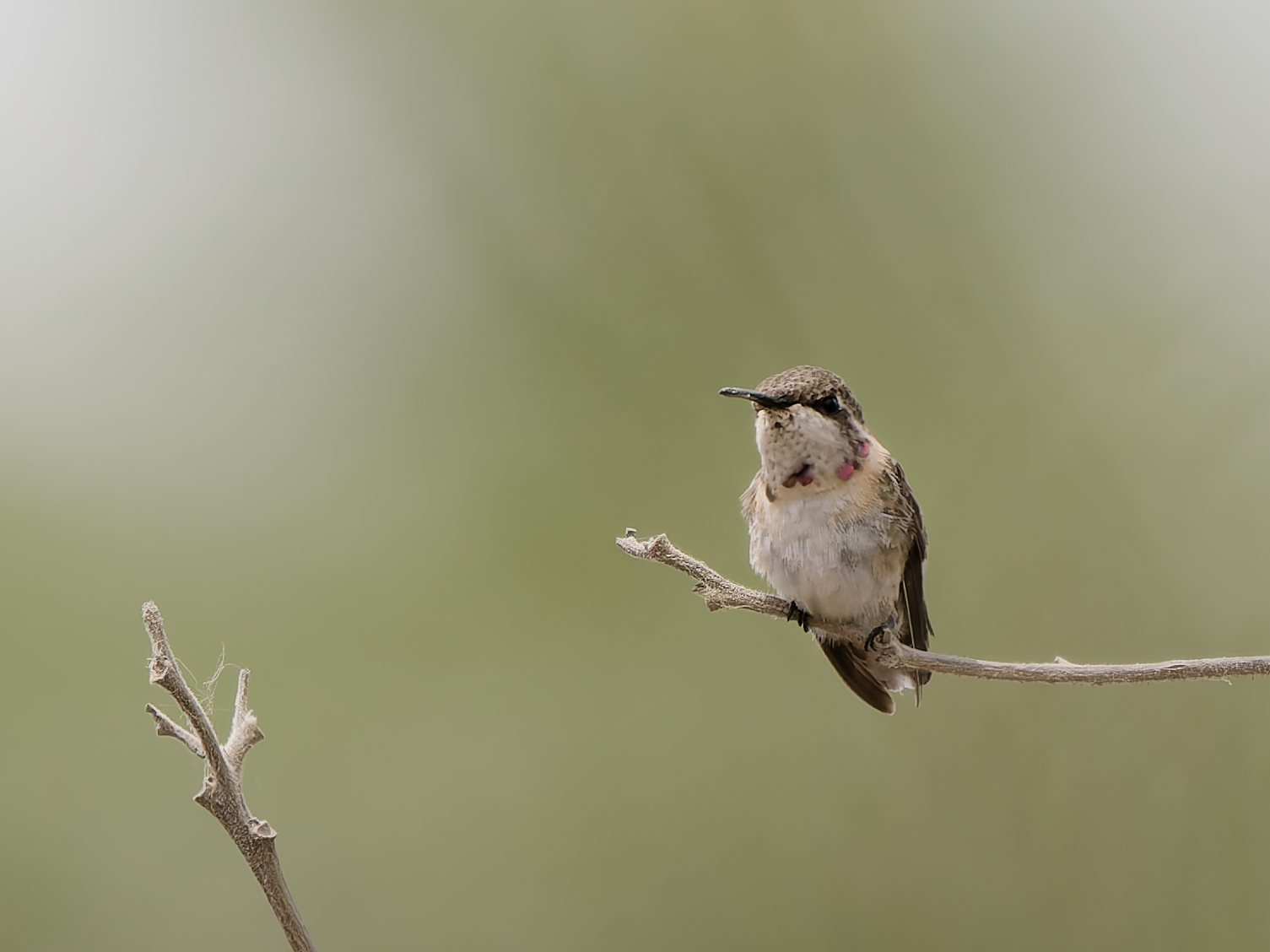
Purple-collared Woodstar in Peru

The purple-collared woodstar (Myrtis fanny) is a species of hummingbird in tribe Mellisugini of subfamily Trochilinae, the "bee hummingbirds". It is found in Ecuador and Peru.

== Taxonomy and systematics ==
The exact relationships within the "bee hummingbirds" are uncertain, but the purple-collared woodstar appears to be closely related to the amethyst woodstar (Calliphlox amethystina). It is the only member of its genus and has two subspecies, the nominate M. f. fanny and M. f. megalura.

== Description ==
The purple-collared woodstar is 7.5 to 8 cm (3.0 to 3.1 in) long and weighs 2.3 to 2.5 g (0.081 to 0.088 oz). Both sexes have a short, decurved, black bill. Their upperparts are bronze-green. Males have an iridescent aquamarine gorget with a shiny violet band below it. The rest of the underparts are dirty white. The long forked tail is dusky brown glossed with light green. The female's underparts are buff, with a bit of white on the throat and belly. Its tail is short and rounded; the central pair of feathers are blue-green, the next pair blue-green with black tips, and the rest black with white tips. The two subspecies are alike but for M. f. megalura's longer tail.

== Distribution and habitat ==
The nominate subspecies of purple-collared woodstar is found in western and southern Ecuador and western Peru all the way south to Arequipa Department. M. f. megalura is found in northern Peru from Cajamarca south to Huánuco. The species inhabits open landscapes such as dry coastal scrub, open woodlands, and gardens. In elevation it ranges from sea level to 3,000 m (9,800 ft), though in Ecuador it is mostly found between 1,000 and 2,000 m (3,300 and 6,600 ft).

== Behavior ==
=== Movement ===
The movements of the purple-collared woodstar, if any, are not known, but elevational movements are thought to be probable.

=== Feeding ===
The purple-collared woodstar feeds on nectar by trap-lining, visiting a circuit of flowering plants. It also feeds on small insects captured on the wing.

=== Breeding ===
The purple-collared woodstar breeds between March and June in Ecuador and June to October in Peru. Males make a semicircular courting display flight. Females build a tiny cup nest of plant fibers and spiderweb in a fork of a thin branch. It is typically placed 2 to 4 m (7 to 10 ft) above the ground, but sometimes higher. The female incubates the clutch of two eggs for 15 to 16 days; fledging occurs 19 to 22 days after hatch.

=== Vocalization ===
The male purple-collared woodstar makes "a series of twittering 'ti-ti-ti-trl' phrases" at the top of its courtship flight, and at the bottom (mechanically) makes "a remarkable, nasal-sounding 'anh-anh-anh-anh-anh'". In a chase it makes "a fast, high-pitched, descending twittering 'ti-ti-ti-ti'", and another call is "a fast dry 'chi-chi-chi'".

== Status ==
The IUCN has assessed the purple-collared woodstar as being of Least Concern. It has a large range, and though its population size is not known, it is believed to be stable. It is considered common throughout its range and readily accepts human-made landscapes like gardens and cultivated areas.
