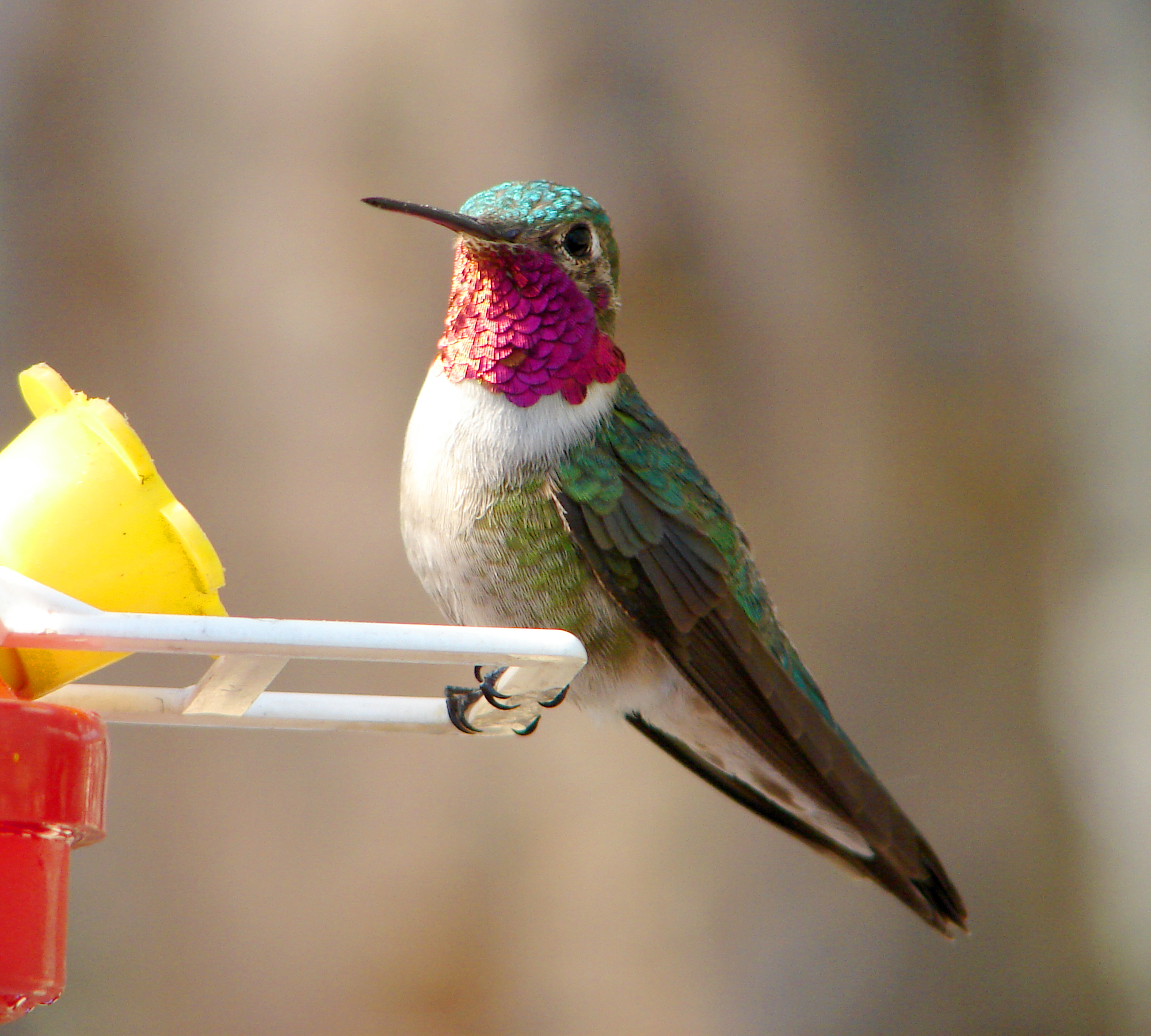
- Adult male at a feeder

Conservation status
- Least Concern (IUCN 3.1)
- CITES Appendix II

Scientific classification
- Kingdom: Animalia
- Phylum: Chordata
- Class: Aves
- Order: Apodiformes
- Family: Trochilidae
- Genus: Selasphorus
- Species: S. platycercus

Binomial name
- Selasphorus platycercus (Swainson, 1827)
- Range of S. platycercus Breeding range Year-round presence

= Broad-tailed hummingbird =

Species of bird

The broad-tailed hummingbird (Selasphorus platycercus) is a medium-sized hummingbird species found in highland regions from western United States and Western Canada to Mexico and Guatemala.

== Description ==
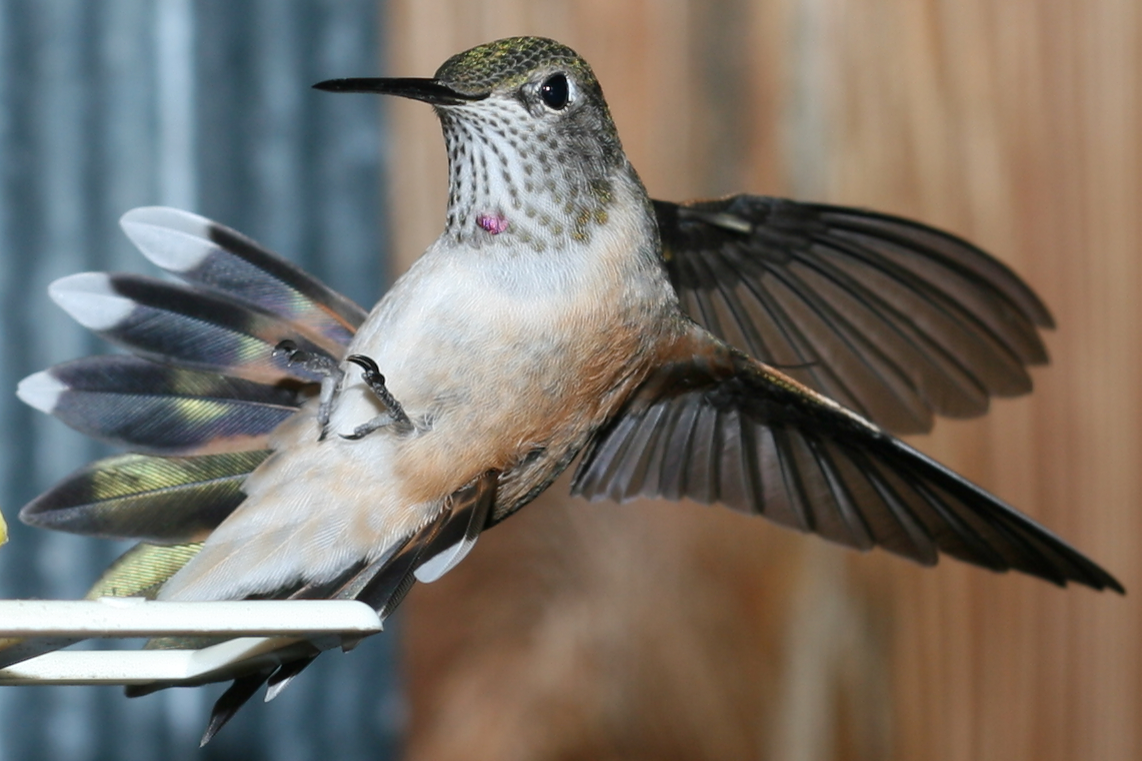
Female landing on a feeder

Medium in size, the broad-tailed hummingbird is 4 inches (10 cm) in length and possesses an overall wingspan of 5.25 inches (13.3 cm). Weighing around 3.6 grams (0.13 oz), the female tends to be slightly larger than the male. Adults of both sexes show an iridescent green back, white eye ring and a rounded black tail projecting beyond their wing tips, from which their name was inspired.

This species shows sexual dimorphism, which means that male and female have different characteristics. The male possesses a characteristic bright rose-red gorget. An identification characteristic is the white eye ring. The female can be distinguished from the male by her paler coloration, cinnamon flanks, and spotted cheeks absent in the male.

=== Vocalizations ===
The broad-tailed hummingbird produces several different sound patterns. This bird's call sounds like a sharp "cheet", which is repeated "cheet cheet cheet cheet...". Hummingbird wing beats have also been found to be a communication signal. These birds produce two different types of sound using their wing beat. The first one is a "wing hum" and is simply produced when the hummingbird flies. This type of wing beat has a sound that ranges from 35 to 100 Hz, and both sexes are able to produce it for communication. The second is "wing trills" produced by the male hummingbird during courtship displays. The wing trill produces a buzzing sound and can be heard 50 m away by other males and 75 m away by other females. This sound is produced when air passes rapidly through the 9th and 10th primary feathers. In one experiment, birds without this wing trill lost their territory more easily to more aggressive birds.

== Taxonomy ==
The broad-tailed hummingbird, Selasphorus platycercus, is a member of the order Apodiformes, in the family Trochilidae. Hummingbird taxonomy has not been extensively studied, but its phylogenic division can be divided as a family into nine clades in which the broad-tailed hummingbird is a member of the "Bee group" and included in the Selasphorus genus. This genus is composed of 6 members taxonomically distinguished based on color characteristics. This genus is characterized by hummingbirds with a plumage containing rufous coloration and a neck gorget of orange to purple in males.

Members of this genus include:

Selasphorus sasin : Allen's hummingbird

Selasphorus rufus : Rufous hummingbird

Selasphorus scintilla : Scintillant hummingbird

Selasphorus ardens : Glow-throated hummingbird

Selasphorus flammula :Volcano hummingbird

On a geographic scale, the genus Selasphorus can be subdivided into 2 groups of species, one living in North America, and a second in the region of Costa Rica and Panama.

== Habitat ==
This hummingbird is seen in the understory or under tree canopies of pine and oak woodland. It forages in open areas with flowers or in grasslands among trees and shrubs. Its breeding habitat is mainly in subalpine meadows, foothills, montane valleys, and stands of aspen or spruce.

== Distribution ==
The broad-tailed hummingbird is found from Guatemala to Mexico, and western United States and Western Canada during summer, while wintering regions are mainly in southern Mexico and Guatemala.

=== Migration ===
This species exhibits partial migration, depending on the northern range during winter. The specific migratory route used by the broad-tailed hummingbird remains unknown, although migrating populations winter in southern Mexico or Guatemala and return to their breeding area in spring. Males arrive first to the breeding range, followed by breeding females. Some populations of the broad-tailed hummingbird in southern Mexico and Guatemala do not migrate, a variation in behavior called "sedentary".

== Diet ==
The diet of the broad-tailed hummingbirds consists mainly of insects and nectar of plants that are "hummingbird-flowered". These types of flowers are characterized by high nectar production and red corollas with a tubular shape, such as Aquilegia elegantula.

== Reproduction ==
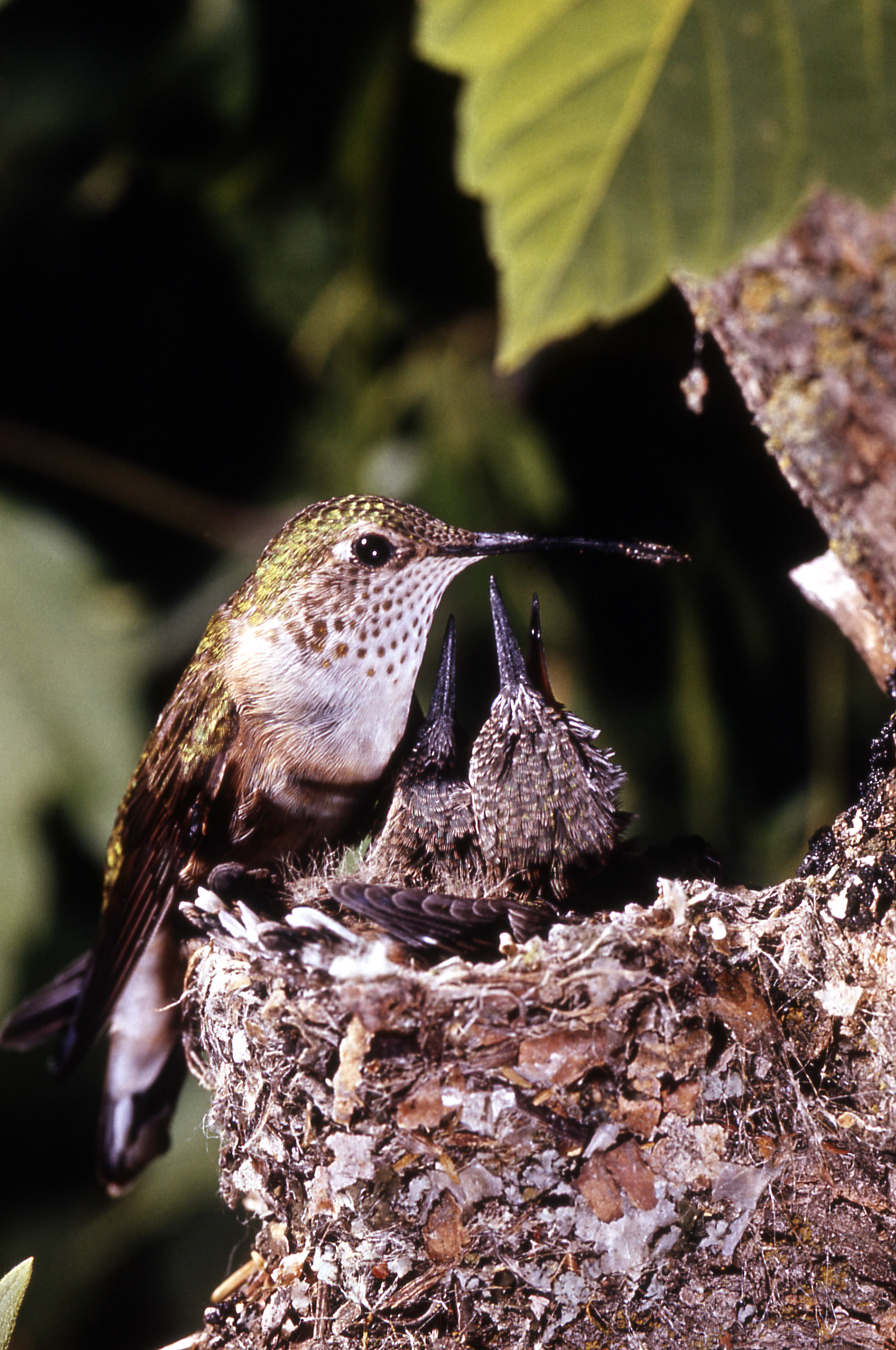
Female at nest

The range of breeding locations appear to be from central Montana in the north to Guatemala in the south. Although broad-tailed hummingbirds have been seen in British Columbia, these birds appear to be accidental migrants, with no evidence for breeding at such northern latitudes.

=== Breeding site ===
The broad-tailed hummingbird has a promiscuous mating system and does not form a pair bond. The reproduction time for broad-tailed hummingbirds correlated with the time flower production is at its peak.

=== Courtship ===
Male perform an aerial display to attract females during the breeding season. Males will fly high and dive while producing a trill sound with their wing feathers.

=== Nest construction ===
In 70% of cases, females return to their nest site from one year to the next. Females build their nest alone, without the male help. The overall nest construction may take around 4 to 5 days. The nest has an overall cup shape and is stuck to a tree branch with spider webs, camouflaged by the addition of an external layer of lichen, moss, and tree material. Nest material can be stolen by other females for the construction of a nest.

=== Brooding ===
The female will lay two white eggs of around 1.2–1.5 centimetres (0.47–0.59 in) in length and incubate them alone for around 16 to 19 days. Nest cup diameter increases as the chicks age. Chicks are altricial at their hatch, and will take around 10 to 12 days for feathering. The female will stay with the fledged young up to several weeks.

== Conservation status ==
The IUCN has assessed this species with a status of Least Concern, indicating it is not a threatened species, having a both a large range – 1,660,000 square kilometres (640,000 sq mi) – and a population size estimated to be 9.8 million individuals. One survey indicated a 52% decline in population between 1966 and 2015. It appears to be adapted to human-modified habitats.
