= Commemorative coins of Costa Rica =

Commemorative coins of Costa Rica have been designed by the Central Bank of Costa Rica to celebrate special events. The following is a complete list of all commemorative coins issued by the BCCR.

== Table of contents ==
Main article: Costa Rican colón

=== 1970 emissions ===
Denomination	Theme	Metal composition	Weight	Coins minted	Ref
2 Colones	20th Anniversary of the Central Bank	.999 Silver	4.31g	5,167 proof	
5 Colones	100th Anniversary of the establishment of Cartago city	.999 Silver	10.78g	5,257 proof	
10 Colones	Attempt of Unification of Middle America	.999 Silver	21.56g	5,157 proof	
20 Colones	Venus de Milo (Universal Art)	.999 Silver	43.12g	7,500 proof	
25 Colones	25 years of social legislation	.999 Silver	53.9g	6,800 proof	
50 Colones	Human Rights	.900 gold and .100 copper	7.45g	3,507 proof	
100 Colones	Native American Gold Art	.900 gold and .100 copper	14.9g	3,507 proof	
200 Colones	Juan Santamaria, National Hero of 1856	.900 gold and .100 copper	29.8g	3,507 proof	
500 Colones	100th Anniversary of Public Education	.900 gold and .100 copper	74.52g	3,507 proof	
1,000 Colones	Independence of Central America, 1821- September 15, 1971	.900 gold and .100 copper.	149.04g	3,507 proof	

=== 1974 emissions ===
Denomination	Theme	Metal composition	Weight	Coins minted	Ref
50 Colones	Conservation of Nature and the Natural Resources	.500 silver, .400 copper, .050 nickel, 0.50 zinc	25.31g	11,250 proof and 6,650 not proof	
100 Colones	Conservation of Nature and the Natural Resources	.500 silver, .400 copper, .050 nickel, 0.50 zinc	31.65g	10,840 proof and 6,650 not proof	
1,500 Colones	Conservation of Nature and the Natural Resources	.900 gold and .100 silver	33.44g	816 proof and 2,370 not proof	

=== 1975 emissions ===
Denomination	Theme	Metal composition	Weight	Coins minted	Ref
5 Colones	25th Anniversary of the Central Bank	Nickel	12g	5,000 proof and 1,995,111 not proof	
10 Colones	25th Anniversary of the Central Bank	Nickel	16g	5,000 proof and 245,085 not proof	
20 Colones	25th Anniversary of the Central Bank	Nickel	20g	5,000 proof and 495,115 not proof	

=== 1979 emission ===
Denomination	Theme	Metal composition	Weight	Coins minted	Ref
100 Colones	International Year of the Child	.525 silver and 0.475 copper	35g	5,000 proof and 9,500 not proof	

=== 1981 emissions ===
Denomination	Theme	Metal composition	Weight	Coins minted	Ref
300 Colones	125th Anniversary of the Death of Juan Santamaria	.925 silver and .075 copper	11g	10,000 proof	
300 Colones	200th Anniversary of the establishment of Alajuela city	.925 silver and 0.075 copper	11g	10,000 proof	
5,000 colones	125th Anniversary of the Death of Juan Santamaria	.900 gold, .100 copper	15g	2,000 proof	
5,000 Colones	200th Anniversary of the establishment of Alajuela city	.900 gold, .100 copper	15g	2,000 proof	

=== 1982 emissions ===
Denomination	Theme	Metal composition	Weight	Coins minted	Ref
250 colones	Jaguar Conservation (Felix Onca)	.925 silver	30.33g	1,109 proof	
1,500 Colones	Juan Vasquez de Coronado and Christopher Columbus	.500 gold	6.98g	724 proof	

=== 1983 emissions ===
Denomination	Theme	Metal composition	Weight	Coins minted	Ref
250 Colones	National Flower, Guaria Morada (Catleya Skinnery)	.925 silver	30.33g	393 proof	
1,500 Colones	Native American Figure	.500 gold	6.98g	272 proof	

=== 1987 emissions ===
Denomination	Theme	Metal composition	Weight	Coins minted	Ref
100 Colones	Oscar Arias Sanchez, Nobel Peace Prize Winner	Nickel	22.68g	25,040 proof	
1,000 Colones	Oscar Arias Sanchez, Nobel Peace Prize Winner	.925 silver and .075 copper	11g	9,901 proof	
25,000 Colones	Oscar Arias Sanchez, Nobel Peace Prize Winner	.900 gold and .100 copper	15g	4,900 proof	

=== 1994 emission ===
Denomination	Theme	Metal composition	Weight	Coins minted	Ref
3,000 Colones	150th Anniversary of the San Juan de Dios Hospital	.925 silver and .075 copper	25.175g	10,000 proof	

=== 1997 emission ===
Denomination	Theme	Metal composition	Weight	Coins minted	Ref
5,000 Colones	100th Anniversary of the Colón	.925 silver and .075 copper	25.175g	10,000 proof	

=== 2000 emissions ===
Denomination	Theme	Metal composition	Weight	Coins minted	Ref
500 Colones	50th Anniversary of the Central Bank	.920 copper, .060 aluminum, 0.20 nickel	9.8g	500 proof and 5,000,000 not proof	(Note: The 500 Colones issued in commemoration of the 50th anniversary of the founding of the BCCR, went out of circulation at the end of 2010, and starting on 2 January 2011, exchanged only by the BCCR. Perkins, Nate. "Central Bank Retires Commemorative 500 Colón Coin". Tico Times.net. Archived from the original on 27 January 2013.)
5,000 Colones	50th Anniversary of the Central Bank	.925 silver and .075 copper	31.1g	7500 proof	
100,000 Colones	50th Anniversary of the Central Bank	.900 gold and .100 copper	15.55g	2,500 proof	

== See also ==
- Economy of Costa Rica
- Commemorative banknotes of Costa Rica
