= Commemorative banknotes of Costa Rica =

Commemorative banknotes of Costa Rica of the Costa Rican colón have been issued by the Central Bank of Costa Rica since its creation in 1950. The following is a list of the different issues printed on all the currently circulating notes along with a short description.

== Table of contents ==
=== 150 Years of Independence ===
In 1971, to celebrate the 150 years of the independence of Costa Rica, the Central Bank issued a limited number of banknotes printed by Thomas de la Rue, London, with an overprint seal which reads “150 AÑOS DE INDEPENDENCIA 1821–1971”.

Image	Denomination	Serie	Issue date	Serial number	Agreement	Signature - Presidente de la Junta Directiva	Signature - Gerente del Banco	Ref
	5 Colones	D	24 May 1971	6500001 – 7500000	#16	Hernán Garrón Salazar	Claudio A. Volio Guardia	
	10 Colones	C	24 May 1971	4500001 – 5000000	#16	Hernán Garrón Salazar	Claudio A. Volio Guardia	
	50 Colones	B	24 May 1971	2450001 – 3000000	#16	Hernán Garrón Salazar	Claudio A. Volio Guardia	
	100 Colones	D	24 May 1971	1100001 – 1700000	#16	Hernán Garrón Salazar	Claudio A. Volio Guardia	
	500 Colones	A	24 May 1971	140001 – 170000	#16	Hernán Garrón Salazar	Claudio A. Volio Guardia	
	1,000 Colones	A	24 May 1971	210001 – 270000	#16	Hernán Garrón Salazar	Claudio A. Volio Guardia	

=== XXV Anniversary of the Central Bank ===
In 1975, to celebrate its 25th anniversary, the Central Bank issued a 5 Colones D series note, printed by Thomas de la Rue, London, with an overprint seal which reads “XXV ANIVERSARIO BANCO CENTRAL DE COSTA RICA 1950–1975”.

Image	Denomination	Serie	Issue date	Serial number	Agreement	Signature - Presidente de la Junta Directiva	Signature - Gerente del Banco	Ref
	5 Colones	D	20 March 1975	6500001 – 7500000	#5	Bernal Jiménez Monge	Alvaro Vargas Echeverría	

=== Centenario Banco de Costa Rica ===
In 1978, on the occasion of the centennial of Banco de Costa Rica, the Central Bank put on circulation a limited number of banknotes printed by Thomas de La Rue, London, with a commemorative inscription on the reverse which reads “1877–CENTENARIO BANCO DE COSTA RICA–1977”, eliminated in the next series. This note continued to be issued by the Central Bank until 1986.

Image	Denomination	Serie	Issue date	Serial number	Agreement	Signature - Presidente Ejecutivo	Signature - Gerente del Banco	Ref
	50 Colones	D	30 October 1978		#9	Rolando Ramírez Paniagua	Rigoberto Navarro Meléndez	
	50 Colones	D	30 April 1979		#7	Rolando Ramírez Paniagua	Rigoberto Navarro Meléndez	
	50 Colones	D	18 March 1980		#14		Rigoberto Navarro Meléndez	
	50 Colones	D	2 April 1981		#21		Rigoberto Navarro Meléndez	
	50 Colones	D	18 May 1982		#1	Carlos Manuel Castillo Morales	Rigoberto Navarro Meléndez	
	50 Colones	D	28 August 1984		#4	Marco Antonio López Agüero	Olivier Castro Pérez	
	50 Colones	D	22 November 1984		#2	Porfirio Morera Batres	Olivier Castro Pérez	
	50 Colones	D	20 March 1985		#4	Rodrigo Bolaños Zamora	Olivier Castro Pérez	
	50 Colones	D	2 April 1986		#3	Eduardo Lizano Faith	Rodrigo Bolaños Zamora	

=== L Anniversary of the Central Bank ===
In 2000, to celebrate its 50th anniversary, the Central Bank issued a limited number of banknotes printed by Thomas de la Rue, London, with an overprint seal which reads “50 BCCR ANIVERSARIO”.

Image	Denomination	Serie	Issue date	Serial number	Agreement	Signature - Presidente Ejecutivo	Signature - Gerente del Banco	Ref
	500 Colones	D*	6 July 1994	02001001 – 02011000	#19	Carlos Manuel Castillo	Carlos Muñoz	
	1,000 Colones	D*	23 September 1998	023955001 – 023965000	#15	Eduardo Lizano Faith	José Rafael Brenes	
	2,000 Colones	A*	30 July 1997	04825001 – 04835000	#13	Rodrigo Bolaños	Carlos Muñoz	
	5,000 Colones	C*	24 February 1999	031001 – 041000	#13	Eduardo Lizano Faith	José Rafael Brenes	
	10,000 Colones	A*	30 July 1997	4830001 – 4840000	#13	Rodrigo Bolaños	Carlos Muñoz	

Note: Every banknote of this serie (*) kept the agreement number and the signatures of the original issues. The only change was the commemorative seal.

== See also ==
- Economy of Costa Rica
- Commemorative coins of Costa Rica
