= Bernal Jiménez =

Bernal Jiménez is the name of:

- Miguel Bernal Jiménez, Mexican composer
- Bernal Jiménez Monge, Costa Rican politician
