= Costa Rican colón =

Currency of Costa Rica

colón costarricense (Spanish)
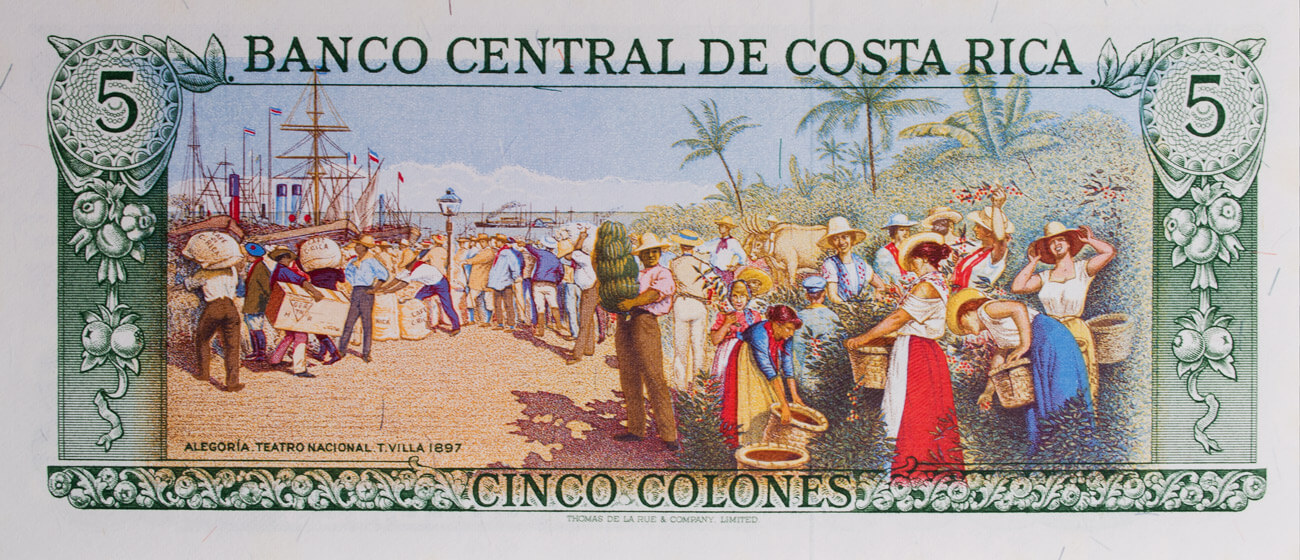
- Old 5 colón banknote

ISO 4217
- Code: CRC (numeric: 188)
- Subunit: 0.01

Units of account
- Plural: colones
- Symbol: ₡
- Subunit
- 1/100: céntimo (out of circulation)

Denominations
- Banknotes: ₡1000, ₡2000, ₡5000, ₡10000, ₡20000
- Coins: ₡10, ₡25, ₡50, ₡100, ₡500

Demographics
- Date of introduction: 1896
- Replaced: Costa Rican peso
- User(s): Costa Rica

Issuance
- Central bank: Central Bank of Costa Rica
- Website: www.bccr.fi.cr

Valuation
- Inflation: -0.22% (2025)
- Source: Central Bank of Costa Rica
- Method: CPI

The colón (plural: colones; sign: ₡; code: CRC) is the currency of Costa Rica. It was named after Christopher Columbus, known as Cristóbal Colón in Spanish. A colón is divided into one hundred céntimos.

== Symbol ==
The symbol for the colón is a capital letter "C" crossed by two diagonal strokes. The symbol is encoded at U+20A1 ₡ COLON SIGN and may be typed on many English language Microsoft Windows keyboards using the keystrokes ALT+8353.

The colón sign is not to be confused with U+00A2 ¢ CENT SIGN (&cent;), or with the Ghanaian cedi, U+20B5 ₵ CEDI SIGN. Nonetheless, the commonly available cent symbol '¢' is frequently used locally to designate the colón in price markings and advertisements.

== History ==
The colón was introduced in 1896, replacing the peso at par. The colón is divided into 100 céntimos, although, between 1917 and 1919, coins were issued using the name centavo for the 1/100 subunit of the colón. Colones were issued by a variety of banks in the first half of the twentieth century, but since 1951 have been produced solely by the Central Bank of Costa Rica. The currency was subject to a crawling peg against the United States dollar from 2006 to 2015, but has been floating within a band allowed by the Costa Rican central bank since then.

== Coins ==
=== First coins, 1897–1917 ===
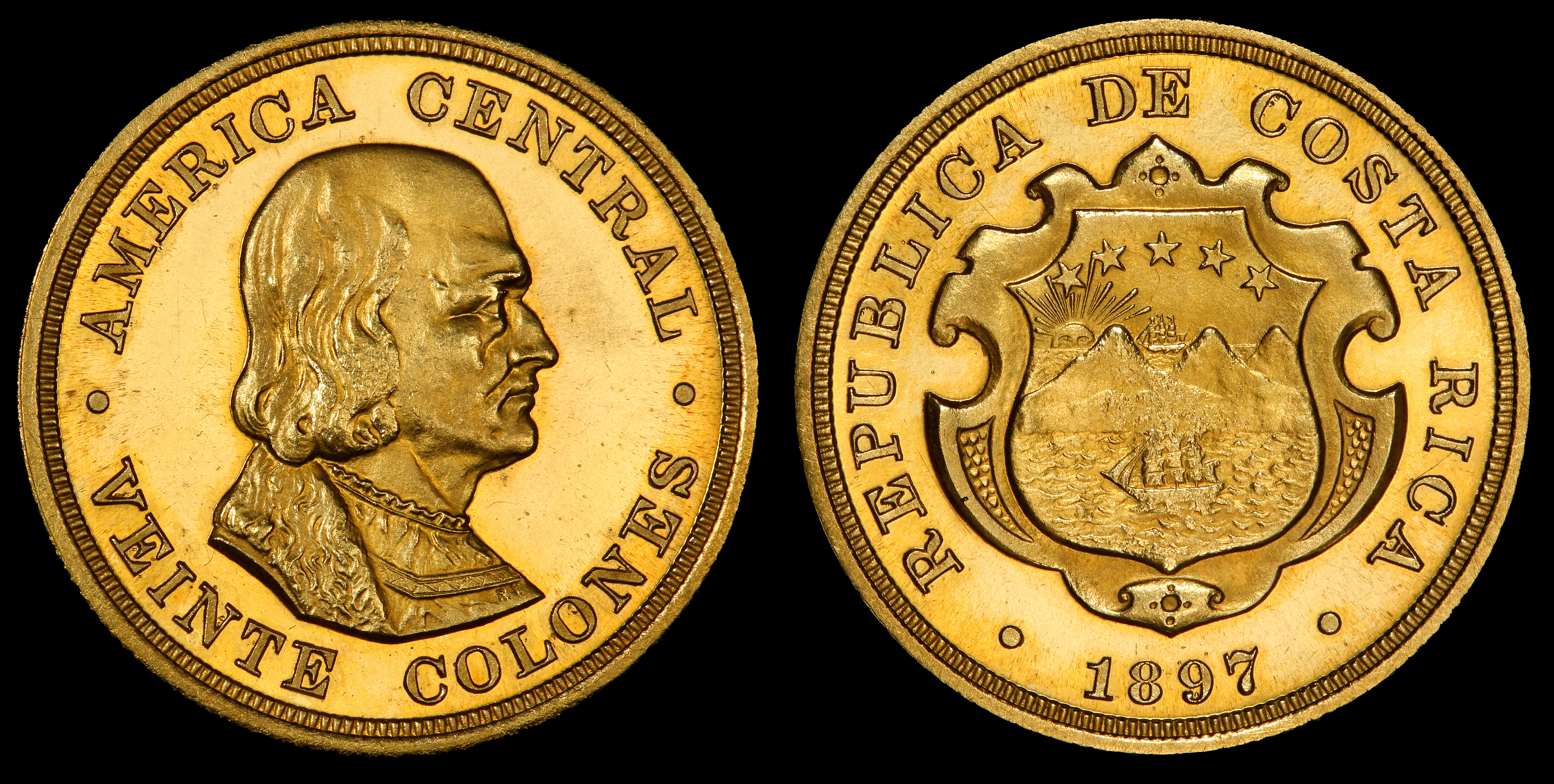
Costa Rica 1897 20 Colones (proof), first year coins were issued. The coin shows the Costa Rican coat of arms on the obverse and a profile of Christopher Columbus on the reverse.

Because the colón replaced the peso at par, there was no immediate need for new coins in 1896. In 1897, gold 2, 5, 10 and 20 colones were issued, followed by silver 50 centimos, and followed by cupro-nickel 2 centimos in 1903 and silver 5 and 10 centimos in 1905. The 5 and 10 centimos bore the initials G.C.R., indicating that they were issues of the government.

=== Centavo, 1917–1919 ===
In 1917, coins were issued in denominations of 5 and 10 centavos rather than centimos. 50 centavo coins were minted but not issued (see below). All bore the G.C.R. initials.

=== Issued by the Government, 1920–1941 ===
The issuance of centimo coins by the government (still indicated by the initials G.C.R.) was resumed in 1920, with 5 and 10 centimos issued. In 1923, silver 25 and 50 centimos from the peso currency, along with the unissued 50 centavos from 1917 and 1918, were issued with counterstamps which doubled their values to 50 centimos and 1 colón.

In 1925, silver 25 centimo coins were introduced. The last government issued coins were brass 10 centimos issued between 1936 and 1941.

=== Issued by the Banco Internacional, 1935 ===
In 1935, the International Bank of Costa Rica issued cupro-nickel coins in denominations of 25 and 50 centimos and 1 colón. These bore the initials B.I.C.R.

=== Banco Nacional, 1937–1948 ===
In 1937, the National Bank introduced coins in denominations of 25 and 50 centimos and 1 colón which bore the initials B.N.C.R. These were followed by 5 and 10 centimos in 1942 and 2 colones in 1948.

=== Banco Central, 1951–present ===
In 1951, the Central Bank took over coin issuance using the initials B.C.C.R. while introducing 5 and 10 centimo coins. These were followed by 1 and 2 colones in 1954, 50 centimos in 1965 and 25 centimos in 1967. In 1982–1983, 5 and 10 centimo coins were discontinued, the sizes of the 25 centimo to 2 colón coins were reduced and 5, 10 and 20 colón coins were introduced. Between 1995 & 1998, smaller, brass 1, 5 and 10 colón coins were introduced and coins for 25, 50 & 100 colones were added. 500 colones followed in 2003. Aluminium 5 and 10 colones were introduced in 2006. Coins of 1 colón are no longer found in circulation. In 2009 the larger, silver-coloured ₡5, ₡10 & ₡20 were gradually withdrawn leaving the small, lighter, ₡5 and ₡10 and the gold-coloured ₡5, ₡10, ₡25, ₡50, ₡100 & ₡500 coins circulating. At the end of 2019, the production of ₡5 coins ceased but remained in circulation.

In 2021, a smaller bimetallic ₡500 coin was introduced to commemorate the bicentennial of Costa Rican independence.

On July 1, 2025, the ₡50 and ₡500 coins of the old series were demonetized. The ₡5, ₡10, and ₡25 coins of the old series ceased to be legal tender on July 1, 2026, making the ₡10 coin the smallest tenderable amount in cash.

BCCR coin series
Denomination	Years	Composition	Shape	Diameter	Weight	Standard Catalog of World Coins	Obverse	Reverse	Image
₡1 (obsolete)	1998	Aluminium-Bronze	Circular	15 mm	2.8g	KM# 233	National coat of arms and year of issue	Face value	
₡5 (obsolete)	1995	Bronze plated Stainless Steel	Circular	21.5 mm	4g	KM# 227	National coat of arms and year of issue	Face value	
₡5 (obsolete)	1997, 1999	Aluminium-Bronze	Circular	21.5 mm	4g	KM#227a; KM# 227a.1	National coat of arms and year of issue	Face value	
₡5 (obsolete)	2001	Brass	Circular	21.5 mm	4g	KM# 227a.2	National coat of arms and year of issue	Face value	
₡5 (obsolete)	2005, 2008, 2012, 2016	Aluminium	Circular	21.5 mm	0.9g	KM# 227b	National coat of arms and year of issue	Face value	
₡10	1995 (Retired)	Brass plated Steel	Circular	23.5 mm	5g	KM# 228.1	National coat of arms and year of issue	Face value	150px
₡10	1997, 1999, 2002 (Retired)	Aluminium-Bronze	Circular	24 mm	5g	KM# 228a.1; KM# 228a.2; KM# 228.2	National coat of arms and year of issue	Face value	150px
₡10	2005, 2008, 2012, 2016, 2018	Aluminum	Circular	23.5 mm	1.1g	KM# 228b	National coat of arms and year of issue	Face value	150px
₡10	2021	Stainless Steel	Circular	23.5 mm	3.5g	N/a	National coat of arms and year of issue	Face value	
₡25	1995	Brass plated Steel	Circular	25.5 mm	7g	KM# 229	National coat of arms and year of issue	Face value	150px
₡25	2001, 2003, 2005	Aluminium-Bronze	Circular	25.5 mm	7g	KM# 229a; KM# 229b	National coat of arms and year of issue	Face value	150px
₡25	2007, 2014, 2017	Brass plated Steel	Circular	25.5 mm	7g	KM# 229c	National coat of arms and year of issue	Face value	150px
₡50	1997, 1999	Aluminium-Bronze	Circular	27.5 mm	8g	KM# 231.1a	National coat of arms and year of issue	Face value	150px
₡50	2002	Aluminium-Bronze	Circular	27.5 mm	8g	KM# 231.1a	National coat of arms and year of issue	Face value	150px
₡50	2006, 2007, 2012, 2015, 2017	Brass plated Steel	Circular	27.5 mm	8g	KM# 231.1b	National coat of arms and year of issue	Face value	150px
₡100	1995	Brass plated Steel	Circular	29.5 mm	9g	KM# 230	National coat of arms and year of issue	Face value	150px
₡100	1997, 1998, 1999	Aluminium-Bronze	Circular	29.5 mm	9g	KM#230a; KM#230a.1	National coat of arms and year of issue	Face value	150px
₡100	2000	Aluminium-Bronze	Circular	29.5 mm	9g	KM# 240	National coat of arms and year of issue	Face value	150px
₡100	2006, 2007, 2014, 2017, 2021	Brass plated Steel	Circular	29.5 mm	9g	KM# 240a	National coat of arms and year of issue	Face value	150px
₡500	2003, 2005	Aluminium-Bronze	Circular	33 mm	11g	KM# 239.1; KM# 239.2	National coat of arms and year of issue	Face value	150px
₡500	2006, 2007, 2015	Brass plated Steel	Circular	33 mm	11g	KM# 239.1a	National coat of arms and year of issue	Face value	150px
₡500	2021	CuNiZn ring; Copper-Nickel core	Circular	28 mm	10.5g	KM# 241	Face Value	Outline of the map of Costa Rica and motif commemorating the bicentennial of independence	150px
₡500	2023	CuNiZn ring; Copper-Nickel core	Circular	28 mm	10.5g	N/a	Face Value	Two coats of arms divided by a ribbon. Commemorating the 175th anniversary of the Republic of Costa Rica.	

== Banknotes ==
=== Private bank issues, 1896–1914 ===
Four private banks, the Banco Anglo–Costarricense, the Banco Comercial de Costa Rica, the Banco de Costa Rica and the Banco Mercantil de Costa Rica, issued notes between 1864 and 1917.

The Banco Anglo–Costarricense was established in 1864 and issued notes from 1864 to 1917. It later became a state-owned bank and in 1994 went bankrupt and closed. Notes were issued in denominations of 1, 25, 50, and 100 pesos as well as 5, 10, 20, 50, and 100 colones. Some 1, 5, 10 and 20 colones notes (unsigned and undated) were released in 1963 when the bank celebrated its 100th anniversary. Some had Muestra sin Valor ("sample without value") printed on them in order to nullify the legal tender status and to prevent people from selling them. Most, however, didn't have that printed on them, which makes it harder nowadays to find notes with the seal.

1 colón, 1917	5 colones, 191x	10 colones, 191x	20 colones, 191x

The Banco de Costa Rica was established in 1890 and issued notes from 1890 to 1914. It is currently a state-owned bank. Notes were issued in denominations of 1, 2, 5, 10, 20, and 100 pesos as well as 5, 10, 20, 50 and 100 colones.

1 peso, 1899	5 colones, 190x	10 colones, 190x	20 colones, 1906

The Banco Comercial de Costa Rica issued notes between 1906 and 1914 in denominations of 5, 10, 20, 50 and 100 colones.

The Banco Mercantil de Costa Rica issued notes between 1910 and 1916, also in denominations of 5, 10, 20, 50 and 100 colones.

=== Government issues, 1897–1917 ===
The government issued gold certificates in 1897 for 5, 10, 25, 50 and 100 colones. Between 1902 and 1917, it issued silver certificates for 50 centimos, 1, 2, 50 and 100 colones.

=== Banco Internacional, 1914–1936 ===
In 1914, the Banco Internacional de Costa Rica introduced notes in denominations of 5, 10, 20, 50 and 100 colones, to which 25 and 50 centimos, 1 and 2 colones were added in 1918. Although 25 centimos were not issued after 1919, the other denominations continued to be issued until 1936. After 1917, the Banco Internacional's notes were the only issued for circulation.

=== Banco Nacional, 1937–1949 ===
In 1937, the Banco Nacional de Costa Rica took over paper money issuing and issued notes for 1, 2, 5, 10, 20, 50 and 100 colones until 1949. Many of the early notes were provisional issues overprinted on notes of the Banco Internacional, including the 1 colón notes which were briefly issued.

=== Banco Central, 1950– ===
The Banco Central de Costa Rica began issuing paper money in 1950, with notes for 5, 10, 20, 50 and 100 colones. The first notes were provisional issues produced from Banco Nacional notes (unsigned and undated). The Central Bank printed on them the corresponding signatures and dates, and the legend "BANCO CENTRAL DE COSTA RICA" over "BANCO NACIONAL DE COSTA RICA". Regular issues of notes began in 1951, but a second provisional issue of 2 colones notes was made in 1967. 1,000 colones notes were added in 1958, followed by 500 colones in 1973, 5,000 colones in 1992, 2,000 and 10,000 colones in 1997, and 20,000 and 50,000 colones in 2011.

2 colones, 1967	100 colones, 1954	5 colones, 1972	1,000 colones, 1973

Current circulating banknotes (2011 series)
Image		Value	Dimensions	Main Colour	Description	
Obverse	Reverse	Value	Dimensions	Main Colour	Obverse	Reverse
		1,000 colones	125 mm x 67 mm	Red	Braulio Carrillo Colina/1840-1842 Costa Rican coat of arms	Dry forest - Guanacaste tree, White-tailed deer, Costa Rican nightblooming cactus
		2,000 colones	132 mm x 67 mm	Blue	Mauro Fernández Acuña/Colegio Superior de Señoritas	Coral reef - Bull shark, Red cushion sea star, Slimy Sea Plume
		5,000 colones	139 mm x 67 mm	Yellow	Alfredo González Flores; Banco International de Costa Rica building in San José	Mangrove swamp - White-headed capuchin monkey, mangrove crab, Red mangrove
		10,000 colones	146 mm x 67 mm	Green	José Figueres Ferrer, Abolition of the Army	Rainforest - Brown-throated sloth, cup fungi, Eriopsis orchid
		20,000 colones	153 mm x 67 mm	Orange	Maria Isabel Carvajal (alias Carmen Lyra); outline of Costa Rica, rabbit stroking a wolf – from Lyra's "Cuentos De Mi Tía Panchita" (Tales of My Aunt Panchita)	Paramo - Volcano hummingbird, Senecio oerstedianus sunflower, and coffee plants
250px	250px	50,000 colones	160 mm x 67 mm	Violet	Ricardo Jimenez Oreamuno, Supreme Court (San José)	Cloud forest - parasol mushroom, Bromelia flower, Morpho butterfly
For table standards, see the banknote specification table.

Current circulating banknotes (2018–2019 series)
Image		Value	Dimensions	Main Colour	Description	
Obverse	Reverse	Value	Dimensions	Main Colour	Obverse	Reverse
		1,000 colones	125 mm x 67 mm	Red	Braulio Carrillo Colina/1840-1842 Costa Rican coat of arms	Dry forest - Guanacaste tree, White-tailed deer, Costa Rican nightblooming cactus
		2,000 colones	132 mm x 67 mm	Blue	Mauro Fernández Acuña/Colegio Superior de Señoritas	Coral reef - Bull shark, Red cushion sea star, Slimy Sea Plume
		5,000 colones	139 mm x 67 mm	Yellow	Alfredo González Flores; Banco International de Costa Rica building in San José	Mangrove swamp - White-headed capuchin monkey, mangrove crab, Red mangrove
		10,000 colones	146 mm x 67 mm	Green	José Figueres Ferrer, Abolition of the Army	Rainforest - Brown-throated sloth, cup fungi, Eriopsis orchid
		20,000 colones	153 mm x 67 mm	Orange	Maria Isabel Carvajal (alias Carmen Lyra); outline of Costa Rica, rabbit stroking a wolf – from Lyra's "Cuentos De Mi Tía Panchita" (Tales of My Aunt Panchita)	Paramo - Volcano hummingbird, Senecio oerstedianus sunflower, and coffee plants
For table standards, see the banknote specification table.

Whenever a banknote of a specific denomination is changed (design, security features, colour, etc.), a new series is released. Prior to the most recent series, every banknote issued by this bank measures approximately 6.7 cm x 15.6 cm. Every note also has the serial and series numbers printed in red ink. Exceptions occurred with:

- 2 colones provisional issue: black
- 5 colones provisional issue: orange
- 10 colones provisional issue: blue
- 500 colones series B: black
- 1,000 colones series A issue: dark blue

Every issue also features the signatures, date, and the agreement number printed in black.

=== Banknote reform ===
In 2011 and 2012, Costa Rican banknotes underwent a reform and were replaced by a new series, with each banknote a different color and size. Two new denominations were introduced as part of the reform; 20,000 and 50,000 colones. The old notes are redeemable at the Central Bank of Costa Rica, but have been replaced with the newer models.

In 2020 and 2021, a new series of banknotes was issued in polymer, conserving the same themes of the 2011 series but with slightly redesigned motifs, with the old notes withdrawn in 2022. A redesigned 50000-colón note was not included in the new series, but existing issues remain legal tender.

== Exchange rate ==
The colón has had an unusual relationship with the U.S. dollar that may best be described as a "crawling peg"; instead of being defined by a constant value to the dollar, the colón instead would grow progressively weaker at a fixed rate of about 3.294 colones per dollar per month. On October 16, 2006, however, this crawling peg was modified due to weakness in the U.S. dollar and the perception that the colón was undervalued.

Since October 17, 2006, the colón is no longer bound to controlled devaluations (known in Costa Rica as minidevaluaciones) by the Central Bank of Costa Rica. With the new system, sistema cambiario de bandas, the exchange rates posted by the Central Bank are a "reference" and each authorized financial institution can determine their value independently in hopes that the free market will provide a mechanism to keep them reasonable.

The exchange rate is now free to float within a currency band referenced to the United States dollar. The floor of the band has been set at a fixed value, while the ceiling changes at a fixed rate. In practice the exchange rate has remained fixed at the lower value of the currency band.

Current CRC exchange rates
From Google Finance:	AUD CAD CHF CNY EUR GBP HKD JPY USD
From Yahoo! Finance:	AUD CAD CHF CNY EUR GBP HKD JPY USD
From XE.com:	AUD CAD CHF CNY EUR GBP HKD JPY USD
From OANDA:	AUD CAD CHF CNY EUR GBP HKD JPY USD

== Nicknames ==
The colón was sometimes referred to as the peso, which was the name of the Costa Rican currency before the colón, until 1896. This is very common across Hispanic American countries, where most have (or had at some point) currencies called pesos. Another slang name is caña (Spanish for sugar cane, plural cañas) but this term is more often used in its plural form and for amounts under 100 colones with multiples of ten, except for 5; e.g., 5 cañas, 10 cañas, 20 cañas, etc. This term has become less common.

Teja (roof tile) is the slang term for one hundred colones, so that five hundred colones coins and notes are called "cinco tejas", while fifty colones coins and notes are referred to as "media teja" (half roof tile).

The former five hundred colones note was called "morado" (purple) because of its color, but it is no longer in circulation.

The one thousand colones note is called "un rojo" (one red) because of its color. This also applies for any amounts that are multiples of a thousand colones (e.g., twenty thousand colones = veinte rojos).

The five thousand colones note is called tucán (toucan), referring to the image of a toucan it once carried (it now features a monkey). It can also be called "una libra" (one pound), although this term is no longer in common use.

The ten thousand colones note is also known as un puma, referring to the puma shown on one of its faces of a previous version.

== See also ==
- Economy of Costa Rica
- Commemorative coins of Costa Rica
- Commemorative banknotes of Costa Rica
