= Banco de Costa Rica =

Bank in Costa Rica

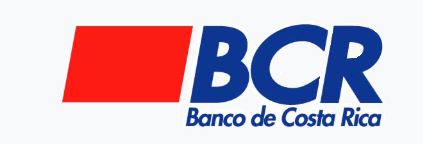

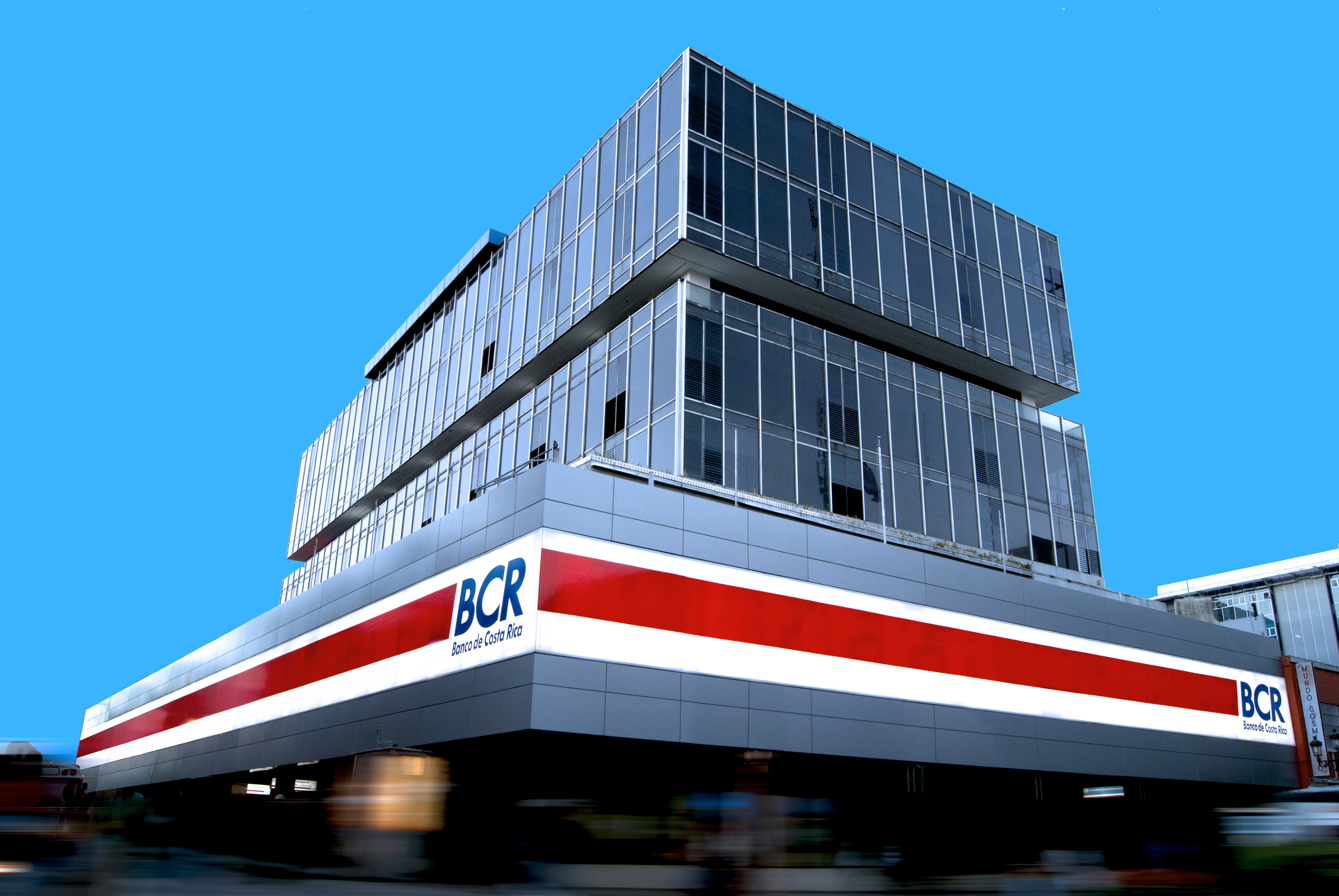
- Banco de Costa Rica main building in San José
- Formerly: Banco de la Unión (until 1890)
- Type: Public bank
- Industry: Commercial banking
- Founded: April 20, 1877; 149 years ago
- Headquarters: San José, Costa Rica
- Key people: Gina Carvajal Vega (President, Board of Directors); Douglas Soto Leitón (CEO)
- Total assets: $7,607,483,881
- Total equity: $806,606,710
- Website: www.bancobcr.com

Banco de Costa Rica (BCR) is a state-owned commercial bank headquartered in San José, Costa Rica. It was established in 1877 as Banco de la Unión, adopted its present name in 1890, and became part of Costa Rica's state banking system after the nationalization of private banks in 1948. With an equity of $806,606,710 and assets of $7,607,483,881, the bank has established itself as one of the strongest banking companies in both Costa Rica and Central America. BCR is an autonomous state institution under Costa Rican law.

By June 2026, BCR was the second-largest bank in Costa Rica by assets, behind Banco Nacional de Costa Rica, with total assets of approximately ₡6.48 trillion.

== History ==
Banco de la Unión was established in San José in April 1877. Its founding dates to 15 April, while the formal incorporation document was signed on 20 April. The latter date is used as the bank's official anniversary.

In 1884, the bank entered into the Soto-Ortuño agreement with the government of President Bernardo Soto Alfaro.The agreement gave it responsibility for issuing currency and administering public revenues. These functions remained in place until 1896.

The institution was renamed Banco de Costa Rica in 1890. It remained privately owned until the nationalization of the banking system in 1948. Its first branches outside San José opened in Limón and Puntarenas in 1928.

After the Costa Rican Civil War, the Founding Junta of the Second Republic nationalized private banking through Decree-Law No. 71, which took effect on 21 June 1948. BCR consequently became a state-owned bank.
