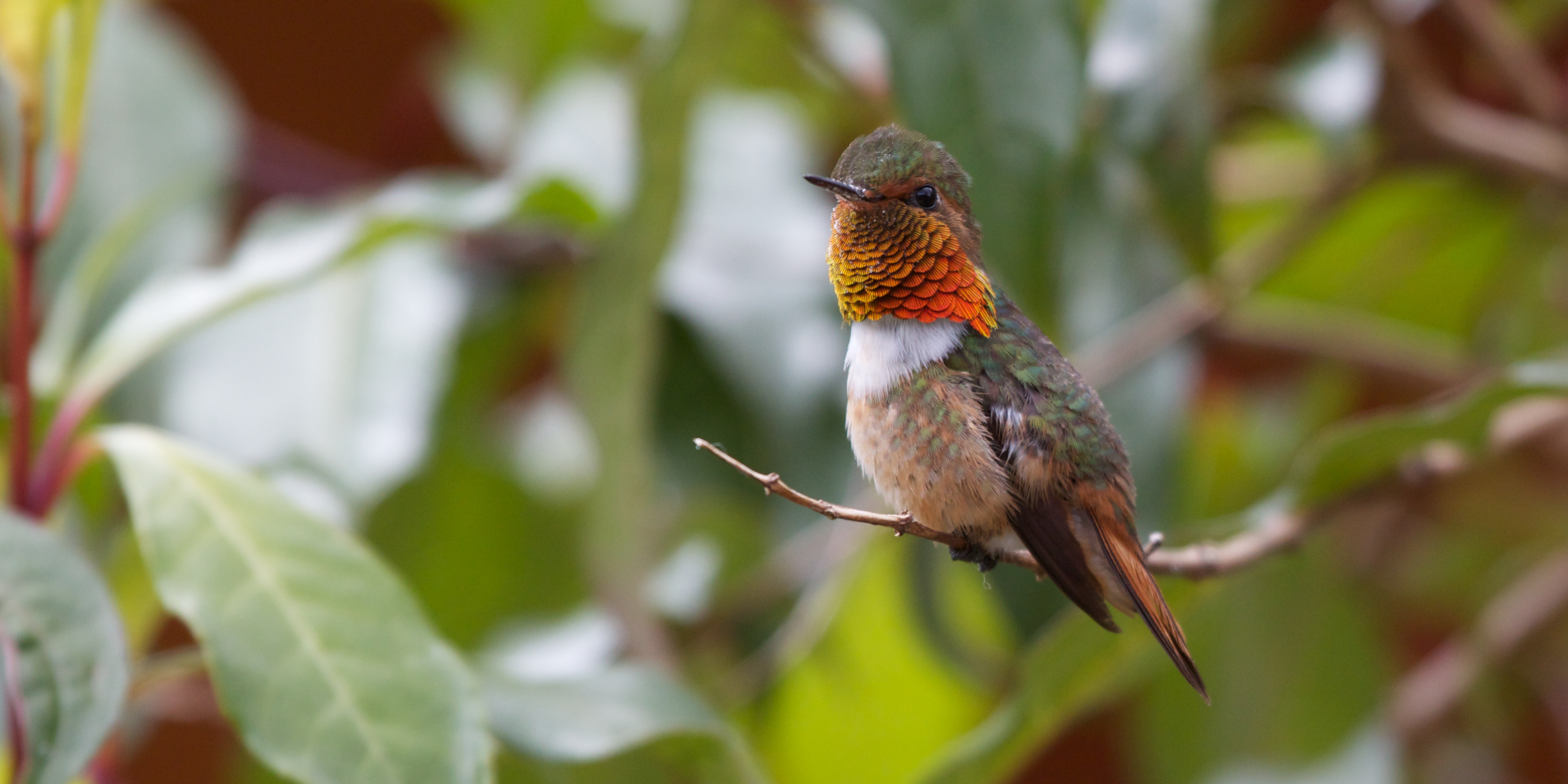

Conservation status
- Least Concern (IUCN 3.1)
- CITES Appendix II (CITES)

Scientific classification
- Kingdom: Animalia
- Phylum: Chordata
- Class: Aves
- Clade: Strisores
- Order: Apodiformes
- Family: Trochilidae
- Genus: Selasphorus
- Species: S. scintilla

Binomial name
- Selasphorus scintilla (Gould, 1851)
- Distribution (green)

Synonyms
- Trochilus (Selasphorus) scintilla; Selasphorus underwoodi Salvin, 1897

= Scintillant hummingbird =

Species of bird

The scintillant hummingbird (Selasphorus scintilla) is a hummingbird endemic to Costa Rica and Panama. This species is replaced at higher elevations by its relative, the volcano hummingbird, S. flammula.

== Habitat ==
It inhabits brushy forest edges, coffee plantations and sometimes gardens at altitudes from 900–2,000 m (3,000–6,600 ft), and up to 2,500 m (8,200 ft) when not breeding.

== Description ==
It is only 6.5–8 cm (2.6–3.1 in) long, including the bill. The male weighs 2 g (0.071 oz) and the female 2.3 g (0.081 oz). This is one of the smallest birds in existence, marginally larger than the bee hummingbird. The black bill is short and straight.

The adult male scintillant hummingbird has bronze-green upperparts and a rufous and black-striped tail. The throat is brilliant red, separated from the cinnamon underparts by a white neck band. The female is similar, but her throat is buff with small green spots and the flanks are richer rufous. Young birds resemble the female but have rufous fringes to the upperpart plumage.

== Breeding ==
The female scintillant hummingbird is entirely responsible for nest building and incubation. She lays two white eggs in her tiny plant-floss cup nest 1–4 m (3 ft 3 in – 13 ft 1 in) high in a scrub. Incubation takes 15–19 days, and fledging another 20–26.

== Diet ==
The food of S. scintilla is nectar, taken from a variety of small flowers, including Salvia and species normally pollinated by insects. Like other hummingbirds it also takes some small insects as an essential source of protein. In the breeding season, scintillant hummingbird males perch conspicuously in open areas with Salvia and defend their feeding territories aggressively with diving displays. The call is a liquid tsip.

== Works cited ==
- Stiles, F. Gary; Alexander F. Skutch (1991) [1989 (1991 is the third printing)]. A Guide to the Birds of Costa Rica. Dana Gardner (illustrations) (1st (paperback) ed.). Ithaca, N.Y.: Comstock Publishing Associates. ISBN 0-8014-9600-4. OCLC 1046303028.
