= Banco Nacional de Costa Rica =

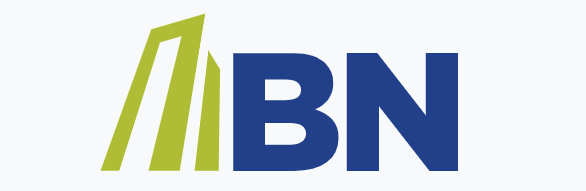

- Headquarters in San José, Costa Rica
- Company type: Public bank
- Industry: Banking, Financial services
- Founded: Banco de Emision: 20 April 1877; Banco Internacional de Costa Rica: 20 April 1877; Banco Nacional de Costa Rica: 1948
- Headquarters: Avenida 3, Calle 4, San José, Costa Rica
- Area served: Latin America
- Key people: Mario Rivera Turcios (General Manager), Guillermo Quesada Oviedo (Commercial Manager)
- Total assets: US$7209.40 million
- Number of employees: 8,000
- Website: www.bncr.fi.cr

Banco Nacional de Costa Rica or BNCR is the largest commercial bank in Costa Rica and the second largest in Central America by assets.

It has a 49% stake in Banco de Costa Rica International Limited (BICSA), incorporated with the Republic of Panama entity, and 100% of the shares of BN-Securities (Stock Exchange Market), BN-Vital (Operator owner pension fund), BN-SAFI (Mutual Funds) and BN insurance broker. in January 2013, the Fitch Ratings classified Banco Nacional de Costa Rica as an 'AA + (cri)' class bank.

== History ==
The Banco Nacional de Costa Rica traces its origins to 1914, when it was established as the Banco Internacional de Costa Rica by executive decree amid the economic turmoil of World War I. Costa Rica was facing a severe financial crisis – private banks were unwilling or unable to lend the government needed funds – and President Alfredo González Flores envisioned a state-owned bank to stabilize the economy. On November 9, 1914, Banco Internacional opened as Costa Rica's first state bank, with a mandate to finance agricultural and rural development, provide credit (including housing loans), and even issue currency to bolster the war-torn economy. This bold move introduced public banking into a system previously dominated by private banks, marking the beginning of a mixed public-private banking structure in the country.

In its early years, BNCR's governance and operations were still evolving. The bank's first director and general manager was Walter Field Spencer, who served from 1914 until 1917. At that time, the President of the Board also acted as General Manager, reflecting a simple organizational structure. Spencer resigned in 1917 due to the political upheaval of the Federico Tinoco dictatorship, which had seized power and imposed its own control over national institutions. Despite this disruption, the Banco Internacional survived the volatile 1910s and fulfilled a crucial role: it became a leading source of credit for farmers and rural businesses, countering the high interest rates and credit scarcity that had plagued small producers under purely private banking. From the start, the bank was conceived as an autonomous public institution (an institución autónoma under Costa Rican law) with its own legal personality and administrative independence, ensuring it could operate in the public interest with relative insulation from political interference.

=== Interwar challenges and the 1936 reform ===
The Great Depression (1929) had a severe impact on Costa Rica's export-driven economy (notably coffee prices), underscoring the need for stronger state intervention in banking. By the mid-1930s, it was evident that the financial system required reform to support recovery and prevent future crises. In 1936, a comprehensive banking reform was enacted – guided by an expert, Dr. Herman Max, commissioned by the government – to modernize Banco Internacional and broaden its services. Under Law Nº 15 of November 5, 1936, the Banco Internacional was reorganized and renamed "Banco Nacional de Costa Rica" (BNCR). This reform transformed BNCR into a true national bank of development, expanding its functions and improving services to better meet the country's needs. The bank gained a formalized Issuing Department to manage and issue the national currency (a role it would maintain until a central bank was created). In fact, after 1936 BNCR began issuing banknotes labeled "Banco Nacional de Costa Rica," initially by overstamping old bills and later with its own designs. These changes established a state-controlled monetary framework, replacing the prior plural issuance by private banks with a single managed currency supply.

Equally significant was BNCR's push into rural finance and social development during the 1930s. The bank pioneered the creation of Juntas Rurales de Crédito Agrícola (Rural Credit Boards) starting in 1937 as a solution to the chronic lack of credit in farming communities. These local credit committees, supported and funded by BNCR, provided small farmers with accessible loans for crop planting, livestock, equipment, and home building – at a time when private lenders charged exorbitant rates. The initial budget for the Juntas Rurales was ₡300,000, and they were set up in key agricultural districts. This program gradually expanded: the number of rural credit boards grew from just 4 in 1936 to 31 by 1948, reflecting BNCR's commitment to decentralize finance and support smallholder farmers nationwide. Although the early reach of the Juntas was limited (due to nascent organization and technical challenges), they marked a breakthrough in financial inclusion and cooperative credit. By issuing a Boletín Rural newsletter and adjusting regulations, BNCR continuously strengthened the Juntas Rurales through the late 1930s and 1940s. The bank also established Almacenes Generales de Depósito (warehousing facilities for crops as loan collateral) and even operated coffee processing plants (beneficios) to help farmers secure better prices.

=== Nationalization and the state banking era (1948–1970s) ===
Costa Rica underwent major political and economic changes in the late 1940s. After the Costa Rican Civil War, the reformist Junta Fundadora de la Segunda República (Founding Junta of the Second Republic) took power in 1948 under José Figueres Ferrer. One of its landmark decisions was the nationalization of all private banks in 1948 by decree. This policy was driven by a desire to democratize credit and place the financial system under public direction in order to accelerate development. With this decree (Law No. 71 of June 21, 1948), deposit-taking became a monopoly of the state – private banks could no longer directly take deposits from the public. BNCR, which was already state-owned, now became part of a broadened National Banking System composed entirely of public banks. Several formerly private banks were absorbed or converted: for example, Banco de Costa Rica (founded as Banco de la Unión in 1877) became state-owned, and other institutions like Banco Anglo Costarricense and Banco Crédito Agrícola were brought under government control. Rather than merging into one entity, these banks operated alongside BNCR, each with specific focuses, under the supervision of the state. BNCR emerged from nationalization as the flagship commercial bank of Costa Rica, given its size and early start, but it now worked in concert with sister public banks to implement national economic policies.

Another transformative step was the creation of a true central bank to manage monetary policy. Until the late 1940s, BNCR itself housed the country's currency-issuing authority (the Oficina de Emisión, or issuing office). In the wake of bank nationalization, Costa Rican leaders saw the need for a dedicated autonomous body to govern money and credit. Law No. 1130 of January 28, 1950 established the Banco Central de Costa Rica, initially as a temporary measure that took over BNCR's issuing department. The Central Bank began operations formally in 1950, inheriting the note-issuing powers BNCR had held. A few years later, the Central Bank was solidified by the Organic Law of the Central Bank (Law No. 1552 of 1953), while the commercial banking activities remained with BNCR and the other state banks. Concurrently, a new legal framework – the Organic Law of the National Banking System, No. 1644 of September 26, 1953 – defined BNCR's functions and governance within the fully nationalized banking sector. Under this law and related constitutional provisions (Articles 188 and 189), BNCR was affirmed as an autonomous state institution with its own board of directors, accountable to the government but with administrative independence.

During the 1950s–1970s, BNCR continued to expand its services and branch network throughout Costa Rica. As a public bank, it channeled credit into priority sectors for national development. For instance, BNCR provided financing for infrastructure and state enterprises – contributing to projects in electrification, healthcare, and industry in tandem with government plans. The bank also played a part in housing finance: it offered mortgage loans and, later, supported the establishment of the Banco Hipotecario de la Vivienda (Housing Mortgage Bank) to specialize in affordable housing credit. In fact, Costa Rica's postwar social reforms saw BNCR nurturing new institutions: the cooperative movement received backing (many credit cooperatives and producer co-ops started with BNCR technical or financial aid), and specialized trust funds were created for agriculture and housing, often managed through BNCR's programs. By the 1970s, BNCR had cemented its role as a multifaceted development bank – it remained the largest bank, with numerous branches across the country, and provided a broadening range of services from savings accounts and commercial loans to letters of credit for trade. Importantly, BNCR maintained a reputation of stability through these decades when state-directed banking was credited with supporting Costa Rica's economic diversification and social welfare policies.

=== 1980s crisis and banking reforms ===
The early 1980s brought a severe economic crisis to Costa Rica, one that tested BNCR and the entire financial system. Between 1980 and 1982, the country was hit by a foreign debt crisis, skyrocketing inflation, and a currency collapse – part of a wider Latin American debt crisis. Under President Rodrigo Carazo (1978– 1982), Costa Rica's government resorted to heavy money printing to finance deficits, which led to a colón devaluation of over 500% and hyperinflation (annual inflation spiked to 65% in 1981 and 82% in 1982). Unemployment doubled and external debt soared to unsustainable levels (around 120% of GDP by 1982). This crisis severely strained the state-owned banks, including BNCR, as loan defaults rose and the value of bank assets plummeted. In response, the new administration of President Luis Alberto Monge (1982–1986) negotiated stabilization programs with the International Monetary Fund and implemented structural adjustments. Costa Rica began moving away from a purely state-banking model toward a "banca mixta" (mixed banking) system. In practical terms, this meant reintroducing private banking activities to complement the state banks and foster competition and efficiency in financial services.

A series of financial reform laws in the 1980s and early 1990s gradually opened the door for private banks and modernized banking regulation. In 1983, Law No. 6899 amended the 1953 National Banking Law, adjusting the rules for state banks and permitting some private-sector financial intermediation under Central Bank oversight. By the late 1980s, new private "financial companies" and later fully fledged private banks were authorized to operate, initially with restrictions (for example, private banks for a time could only take foreign-currency deposits, preserving colón deposits for state banks). Further liberalization came with the Modernization of the Financial System law in the early 1990s (Law No. 7107), which aimed to increase competition, strengthen bank supervision, and prepare Costa Rica for a more open economy. In this period, BNCR underwent internal modernization to remain competitive. It embraced new technologies (such as electronic payment systems and ATM networks) and improved efficiency under stricter prudential regulations enforced by the Central Bank and a newly empowered General Superintendence of Financial Entities (SUGEF).

A notable event in the 1990s was the collapse of Banco Anglo Costarricense (a state-owned bank) in 1994 due to fraud and mismanagement. While this scandal did not directly involve BNCR, it shook public confidence and prompted sweeping banking reforms, including better oversight of state banks. BNCR itself remained solvent and stable through the turmoil, further solidifying its image as a pillar of reliability. By the end of the 1990s, Costa Rica's banking landscape featured both robust public banks (with BNCR still the largest by assets) and a growing private banking sector. BNCR had to adapt to compete: it diversified its offerings and organizational structure, establishing subsidiaries such as BN-V Valores (a brokerage house), BN-Vital (pensions), BN-SAFI (investment funds manager), and BN Corredora de Seguros (insurance brokerage) in subsequent years. These units allowed BNCR to offer one-stop financial services beyond traditional banking, in line with global trends. Throughout the late 20th century, BNCR balanced its developmental mission – e.g. continuing to provide a large share of credit to agriculture, industry, and housing – with the pressures of financial modernization and competition.

=== Modern era and legacy (2000s–Present) ===
In the 21st century, Banco Nacional de Costa Rica remains a leading force in the country's economic, social, and even technological progress. The bank's main headquarters is a 22-story tower in downtown San José (completed in 1982), which was once the tallest building in Costa Rica and stands as a symbol of BNCR's modern presence. BNCR today operates an extensive network of over 170 branches and 400 ATMs nationwide, serving millions of customers from all walks of life. It was a pioneer in digital banking locally, rolling out internet banking and mobile banking services as early as the 2000s to increase convenience for its clients.

Crucially, BNCR has retained its public-service orientation while staying financially sound and profitable. It consistently holds roughly a third of Costa Rica's banking market share and has been instrumental in funding national development projects. For instance, BNCR has managed large trust funds (fideicomisos) to finance infrastructure like power plants, roads, and public buildings in partnership with the government and other institutions. The bank's strong capital base and prudent management helped it weather the 2008 global financial crisis and the economic challenges of the COVID-19 pandemic era without major distress.

== Offices ==
- Panama - Bicsa Financial Center, Panama City
- Costa Rica - Plaza Salamanca Building (Orosi, Guanacaste), San José
- United States - 4000 Ponce de Leon Blvd, Miami

== See also ==
- Central Bank of Costa Rica
