= Bernal Jiménez Monge =

Costa Rican economist and politician (1930–2021)

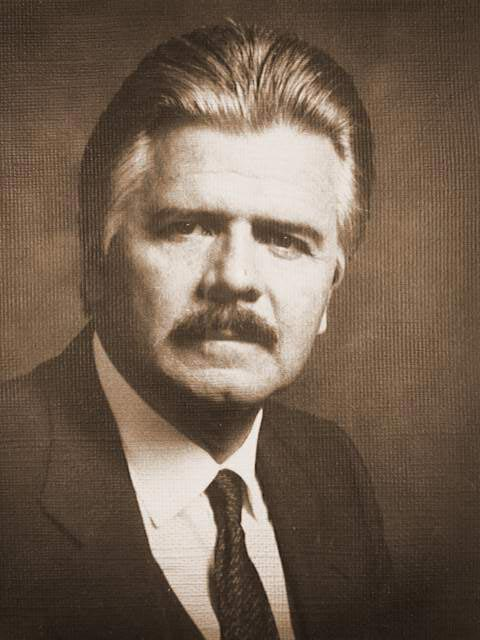
Bernal Jiménez Monge

Bernal Jiménez Monge (8 January 1930 – 20 March 2021) was a Costa Rican economist and politician who served as MP.

Jiménez was Minister of Economy and Finance from 1963 to 1966. He was president of the Central Bank of Costa Rica in 1973 and from 1974 to 1977. Later he was president of the Legislative Assembly from 1984 to 1985.

He was the president of National Liberation Party from 2010 to 2015.
