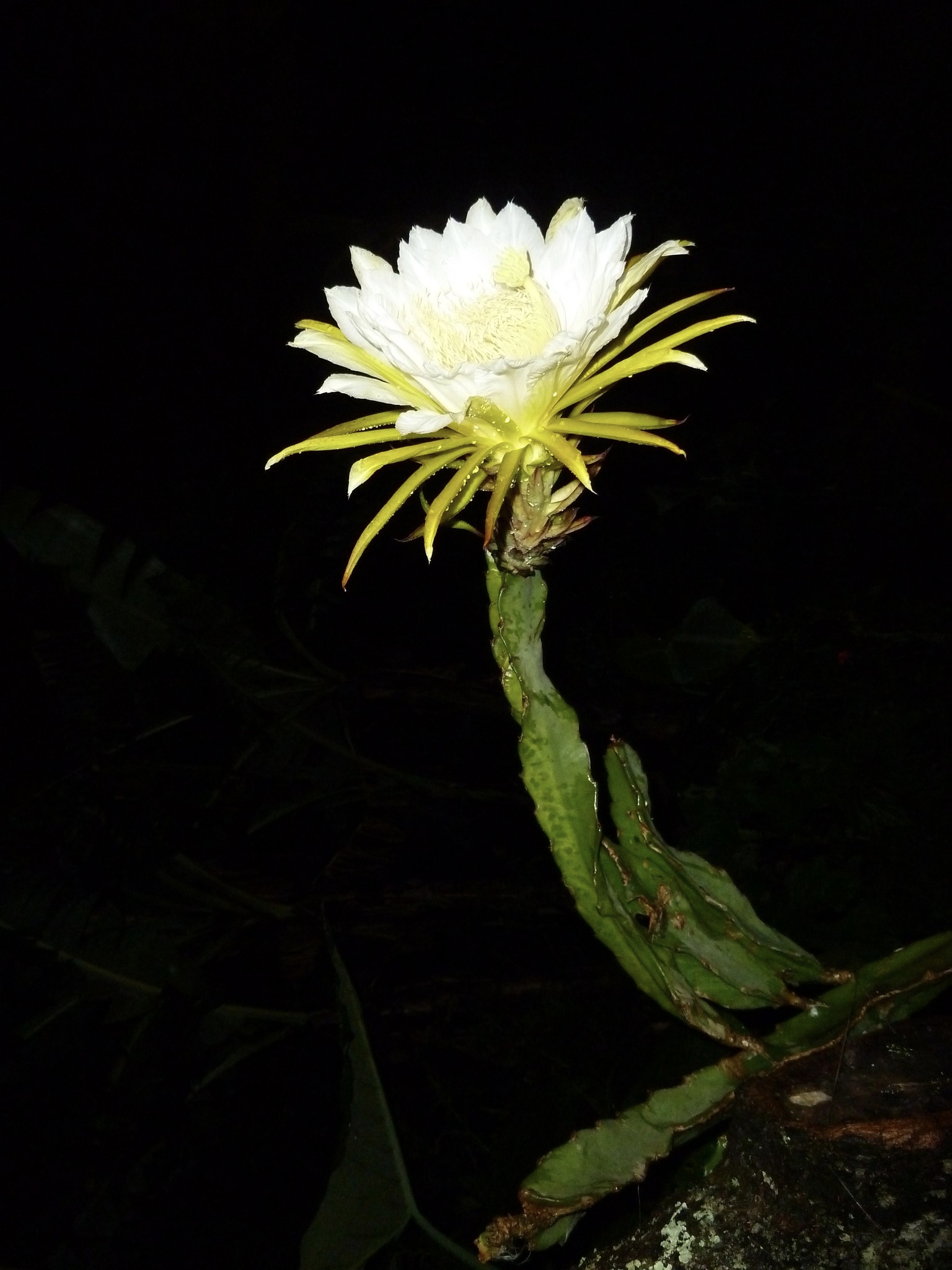

Conservation status
- Least Concern (IUCN 3.1)

Scientific classification
- Kingdom: Plantae
- Clade: Tracheophytes
- Clade: Angiosperms
- Clade: Eudicots
- Order: Caryophyllales
- Family: Cactaceae
- Subfamily: Cactoideae
- Genus: Selenicereus
- Species: S. costaricensis

Binomial name
- Selenicereus costaricensis (F.A.C.Weber) S.Arias & N.Korotkova ex Hammel
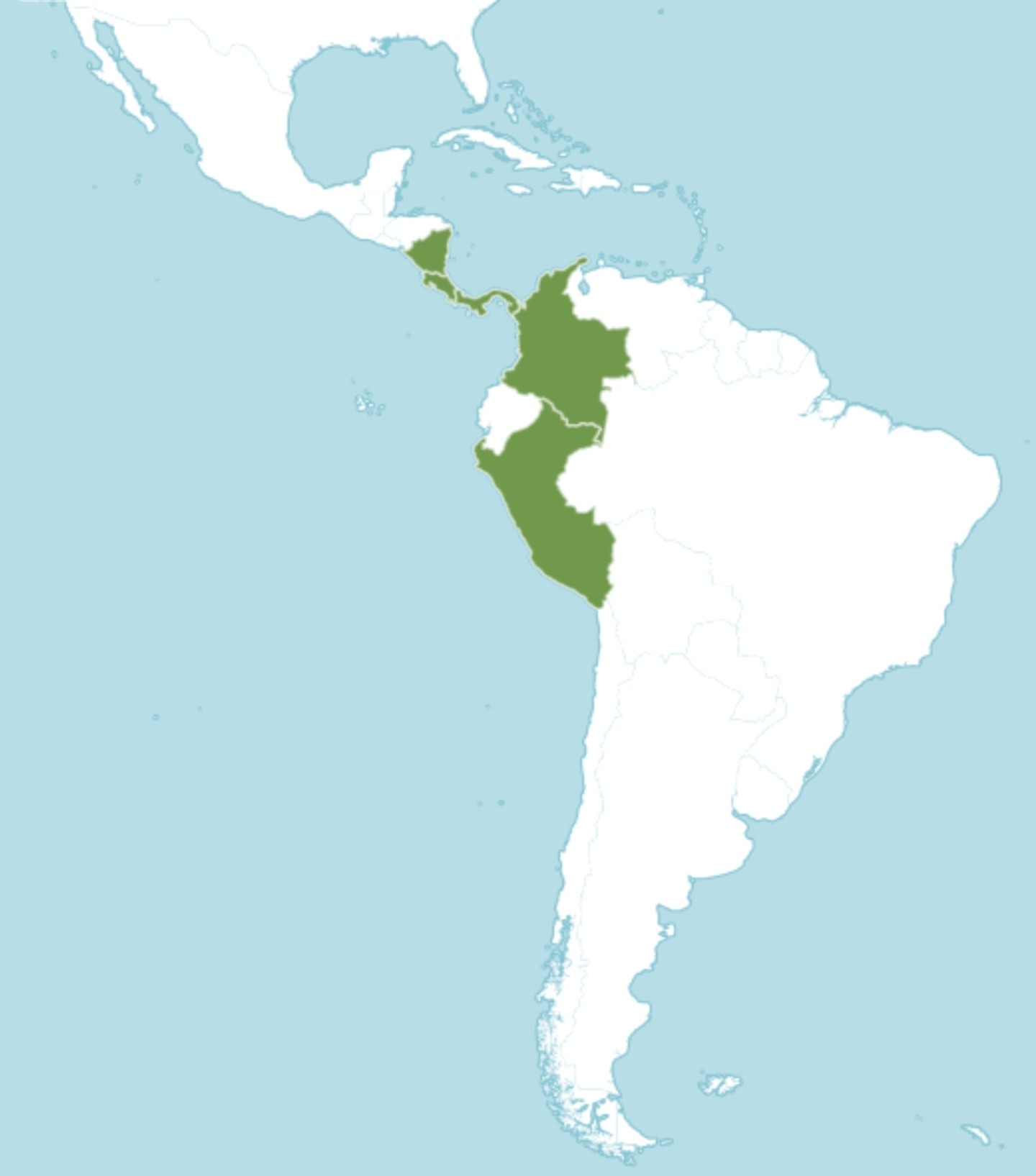
- Occurrence records of Selenicereus costaricensis

Synonyms
- Cereus costaricensis (F.A.C.Weber) A.Berger; Cereus trigonus var. costaricensis F.A.C.Weber; Hylocereus costaricensis (F.A.C.Weber) Britton & Rose; Hylocereus microcladus Backeb.; Selenicereus microcladus (Backeb.) Lodé

= Selenicereus costaricensis =

Costa Rica nightblooming cactus

Species of cactus

Selenicereus costaricensis, also known as Costa Rica nightblooming cactus or Costa Rican pitaya, is a perennial climbing succulent in the cactus family (Cactaceae). Its fruit, a type of pitaya (dragon fruit), has high economic and nutritional value. The species is native to Central America and northwestern South America, ranging from Nicaragua to northern Peru in seasonally dry tropical biomes.

== Description ==
Selenicereus costaricensis forms vigorous vines, sometimes 10 cm broad, that are normally three-angled, at first green or purplish but soon becoming white and afterwards green or gray. The ribs or wings of the stems are comparatively thin, although in age becoming more turgid, with rather variable margins, either straight or somewhat undulate, obtuse, never horny. The areoles have two to four short, rather stout, brownish spines, usually accompanied by two white hairs or bristles which finally drop off. The young flower-buds are purple and globular. The strongly fragrant flowers are 30 cm long or more. Their outer perianth-segments are narrow, more or less reddish, especially the tips; the inner perianth-segments are pure white. The stigma-lobes are rather short, yellowish, and entire; the ovary is covered with closely set scales, these having deep purple margins. The oblong fruit is scarlet, and about 10 cm.

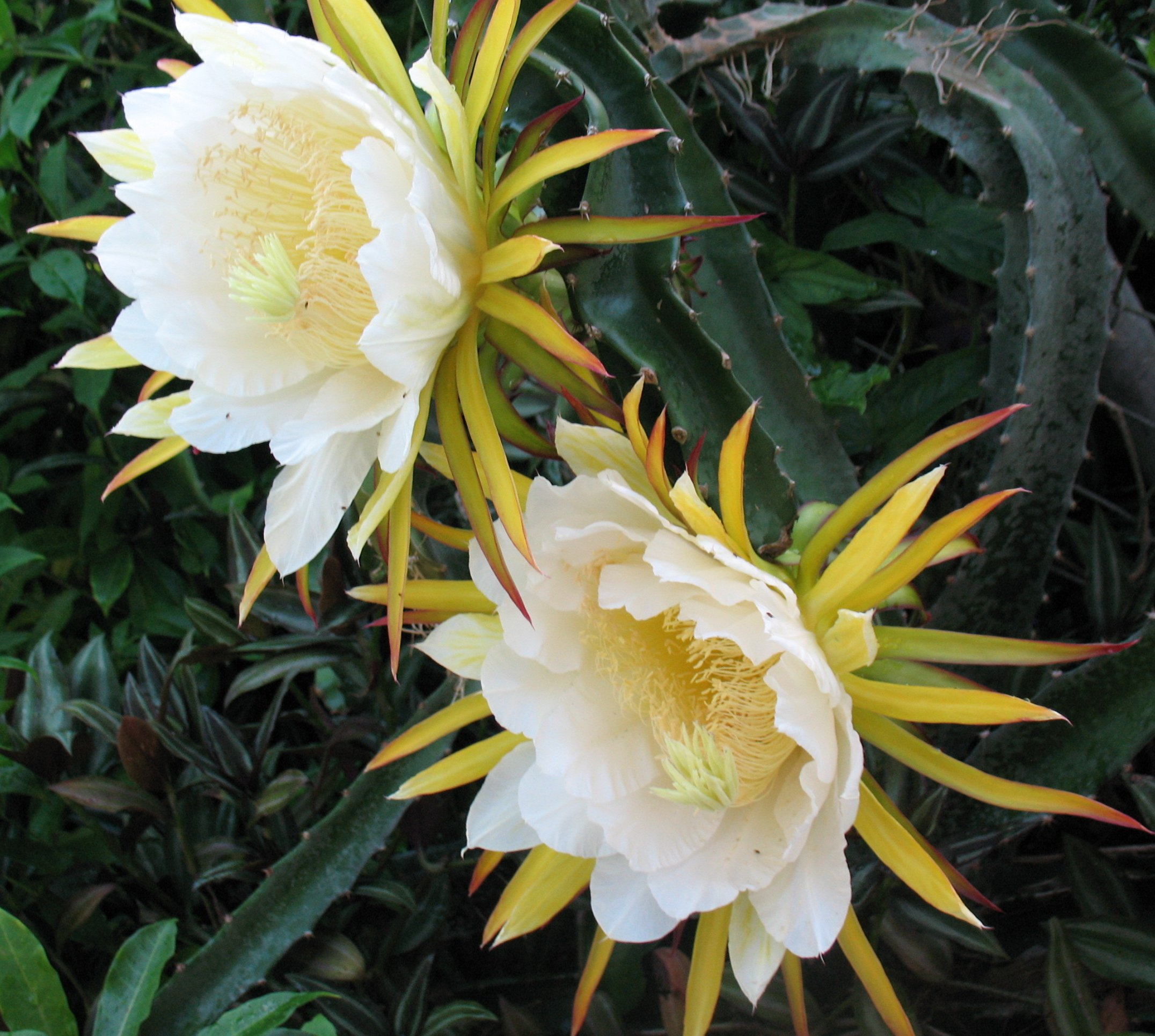
Flowers

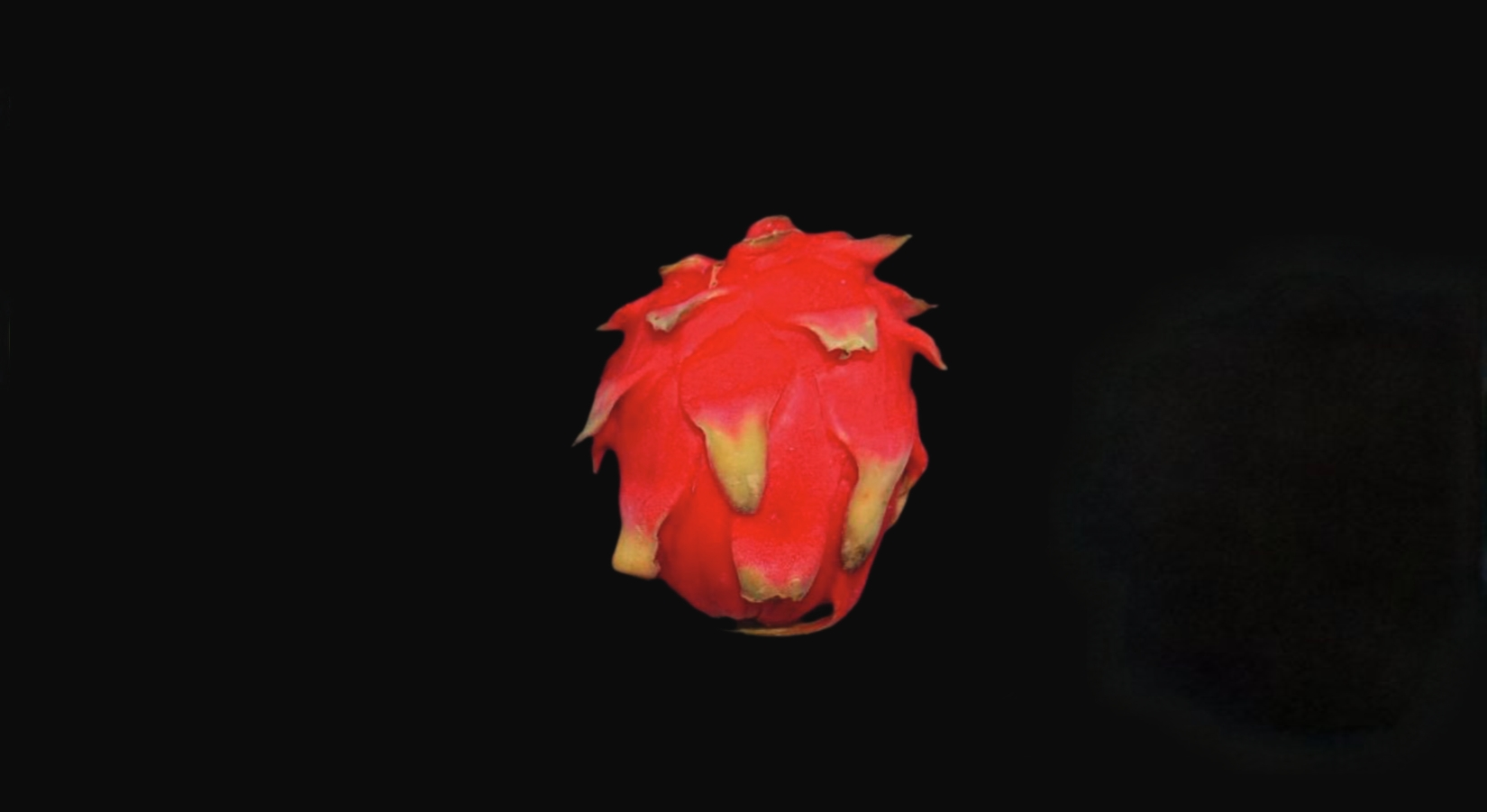
Fruit

== Taxonomy ==
In 1902, Frédéric Weber first published the name Cereus trigonus var. costaricensis. The epithet costaricensis refers to Costa Rica, where the species is native. Weber described a plant with triangular stems similar to Cereus trigonus, but distinguished by "its more glaucous stem and especially by its fruit, which is just as large but more spherical, less scaly, and filled with a crimson pulp of a very delicate taste."

Weber mentioned a photograph of the plant, but as of 2017 it had not been located, so the name lacked a type.

In 1909, Britton and Rose transferred the plant to the genus Hylocereus and raised it to full species as Hylocereus costaricensis.

A molecular phylogenetic study in 2017 confirmed earlier research showing that Hylocereus is nested within Selenicereus, so all species of Hylocereus were transferred to Selenicereus, making this species Selenicereus costaricensis. However, the names remained problematic in the absence of a type.

In 2021, a lectotype was designated for the species, and the name has since been accepted by the International Plant Names Index and Plants of the World Online.

== Distribution ==
The natural range of the species extends from Nicaragua, Costa Rica, and Panama in Central America to Colombia and northern Peru in South America. Its original distribution is difficult to determine precisely because of long‑term cultivation. In Costa Rica and Nicaragua it grows in dry or deciduous coastal forests and rocky areas at elevations of 0–1400 m. It has been introduced to many regions as a crop plant.

== Biology ==
Selenicereus costaricensis is self‑compatible, meaning pollen from the same flower can cause the ovary to develop into a fruit, but cross‑pollination significantly increases fruit size and weight. Under natural conditions, the combined activity of nocturnal and diurnal pollinators produces the largest fruits. The main pollinators are night‑active hawkmoths and honey bees (e.g. Apis mellifera), which visit the flowers en masse just before dawn. Bats do not pollinate this species. The flowers produce no measurable nectar, and pollinators are rewarded mainly with pollen.

In humid tropical climates, the time from flowering to fruit ripening is about 32 days. The optimal harvest time is when the peel turns completely purplish‑red and the hue angle falls below 30 degrees. The red pigment (betalain) accumulates rapidly about one week before ripening, at which point the pulp changes from white to red. The fruit’s antioxidant content is higher at mid‑development and decreases after full ripening.

The seeds contain potential allergens that can be recognized by the immune system of sensitised individuals. These allergens may share structural similarity with common inhaled allergens such as pollen and dust mites, potentially causing cross‑allergic reactions in some people.

== Cultivation ==
Selenicereus costaricensis is a plant that thrives in warm, dry, and sunny conditions. While it tolerates drought well, it has little resistance to cold; its preferred growing temperature lies between 20 and 30 °C. The species is not particular about soil type, though it performs best in well‑drained sandy loam. In commercial production, growers plant either cuttings or tissue‑cultured seedlings and provide climbing supports for the vines.

To improve propagation efficiency, researchers have developed tissue culture protocols for this species. By selecting suitable culture media, plant growth regulators, and acclimatisation substrates, rapid and large‑scale seedling production can be achieved. Traditional cutting propagation has also been studied; treating cuttings with appropriate concentrations of rooting promoters significantly increases rooting rate and root quality.

To improve fruit quality, it is recommended to maintain genetic diversity within the plantation—avoiding the use of a single clone—and to introduce beehives, which can enhance pollination efficiency. Common pests and diseases include soft rot, anthracnose, and scale insects. These can be managed through proper pruning, good ventilation, and biological control methods. Fruit development takes approximately 32 days, and harvesting is done when the peel turns a uniform purplish‑red, corresponding to a hue angle below 30 degrees.

== Conservation status ==
According to the IUCN Red List, Hylocereus costaricensis (synonymous with Selenicereus costaricensis) is assessed as least concern. In Costa Rica and Nicaragua the species has a wide range and populations are common to very abundant.

The assessment notes that although threats such as coastal development, tourism infrastructure, deforestation for pasture, and overharvesting of fruit exist, they are not severe enough to warrant a threatened category.

A report (Murillo and Arias 2005) claimed that wild fruit harvesting is pushing the species toward extinction in Costa Rica, but the assessor B. Hammel questioned this view. The species occurs in protected areas such as Tepisque and Guanacaste in Costa Rica, and has also been recorded in Santa Rosa National Park. It is listed in Nicaragua’s red list.
