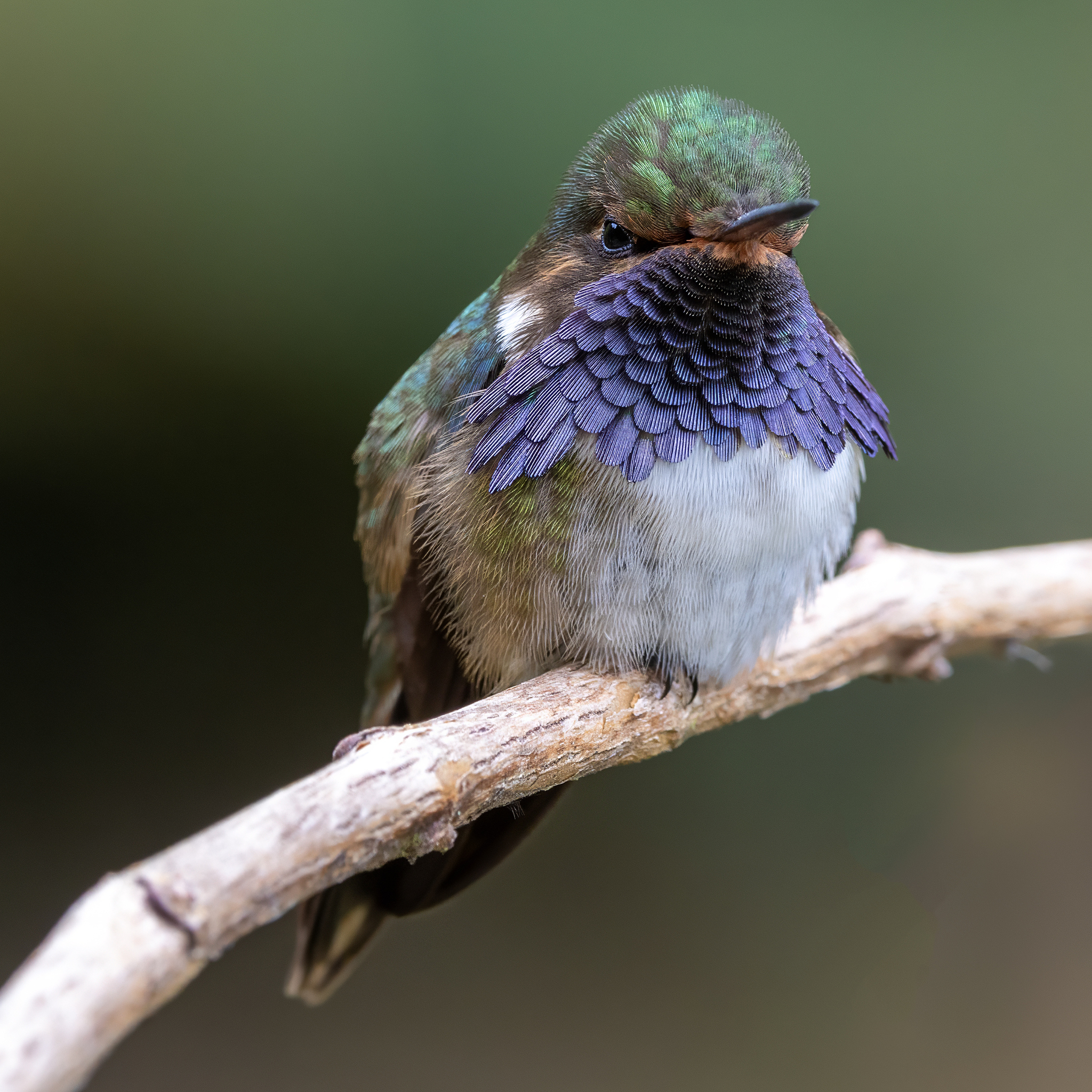

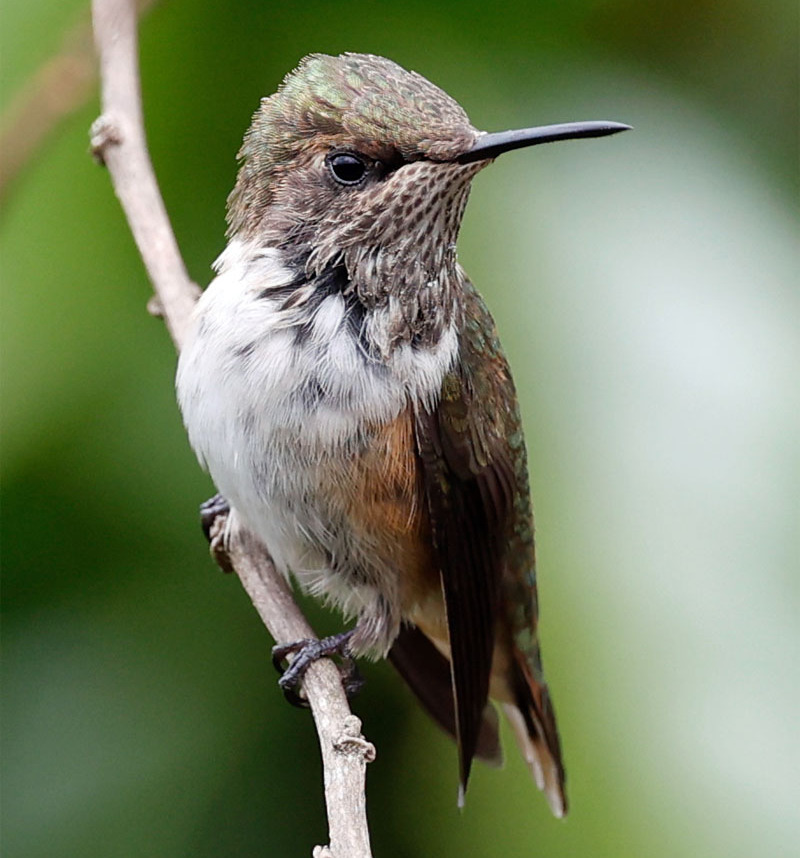
- Male (top) and female (bottom)

Conservation status
- Least Concern (IUCN 3.1)
- CITES Appendix II (CITES)

Scientific classification
- Kingdom: Animalia
- Phylum: Chordata
- Class: Aves
- Clade: Strisores
- Order: Apodiformes
- Family: Trochilidae
- Genus: Selasphorus
- Species: S. flammula

Binomial name
- Selasphorus flammula Salvin, 1865

= Volcano hummingbird =

The volcano hummingbird (Selasphorus flammula) is a species of hummingbird in tribe Mellisugini of subfamily Trochilinae, the "bee hummingbirds". It is found in Costa Rica and Panama. This hummingbird is the one that appears on the 20 thousand colones bill from Costa Rica.

== Taxonomy and systematics ==
The volcano hummingbird has three subspecies, the nominate S. f. flammula, S. f. torridus, and S. f. simoni. All three have at times been treated as color morphs rather than subspecies and at other times as individual species.

== Description ==
The volcano hummingbird is 7.5 to 8 cm (3.0 to 3.1 in) long. Males weigh about 2.5 g (0.088 oz) and females 2.8 g (0.099 oz). Both sexes of all subspecies have a short, straight, black bill and a small white spot behind the eye. The adult male of the nominate subspecies has bronze-green upperparts and rufous-edged black outer tail feathers. Its gorget is mauve-purple and the rest of the underparts mostly white. The sides of the breast have a buffy to pale cinnamon wash and green speckles. The adult female is also bronze-green above. Its central tail feathers are green and the rest have rufous bases, a black band near the end, and buffy to white tips. The throat is whitish with dusky bronze speckles and the rest of the underparts are like the male's. Juveniles are similar to the adult female but have buffy fringes on the upperparts' feathers.

Both sexes of subspecies S. f. torridus are whiter below than the nominate, and males have a purplish-gray gorget. Both sexes of S. f. simoni are buffier below than the nominate and have more black on the tail. The male's gorget is rose red.

== Distribution and habitat ==
The nominate subspecies of volcano hummingbird is found on Volcanoes Irazú and Turrialba in central Costa Rica. Subspecies S. f. torridus is found on the Cordillera de Talamanca of southern Costa Rica and on Volcán Barú in extreme western Panama. S. f. simoni is found on Volcanes Poás and Barva (or Barba) in central Costa Rica.

The species inhabits a variety of semi-open to open habitats on high mountain slopes. Examples include páramo, second growth on landslide scars or ashfall areas, scrubby pastures, and the edges of elfin forest and taller forest. It is found mostly between elevations of 2,000 and 3,500 m (6,600 and 11,500 ft) but occurs locally down to 1,800 m (5,900 ft) and seasonally as low as 1,350 m (4,400 ft).

== Behavior ==
=== Movement ===
The volcano hummingbird breeds at the higher elevations of its range, and after breeding some descend much lower and may even move to an adjacent mountain. The latter allows some mixing of the subspecies.

=== Feeding ===
The volcano hummingbird forages for nectar at a wide variety of flowers, mostly small ones on shrubs, vines, herbs, and small trees. It also feeds from larger flowers that bees or flowerpiercers (Diglossa) have made holes in. Males commonly defend clusters of flowers and females do so less frequently. In addition to nectar the species feeds on small arthropods taken on the wing or, for the female especially, by gleaning from foliage or picking from spider webs.

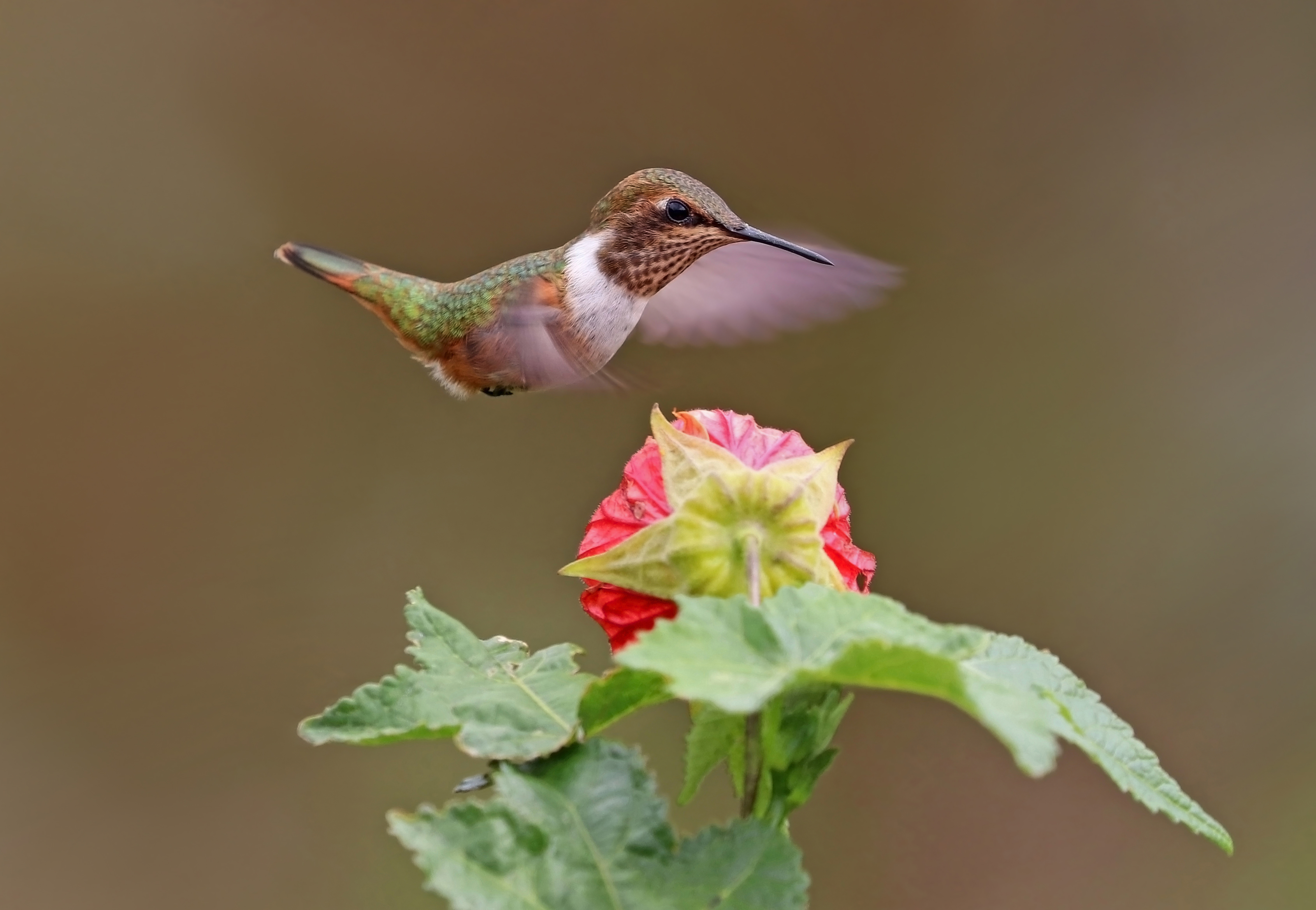
Female in Panama

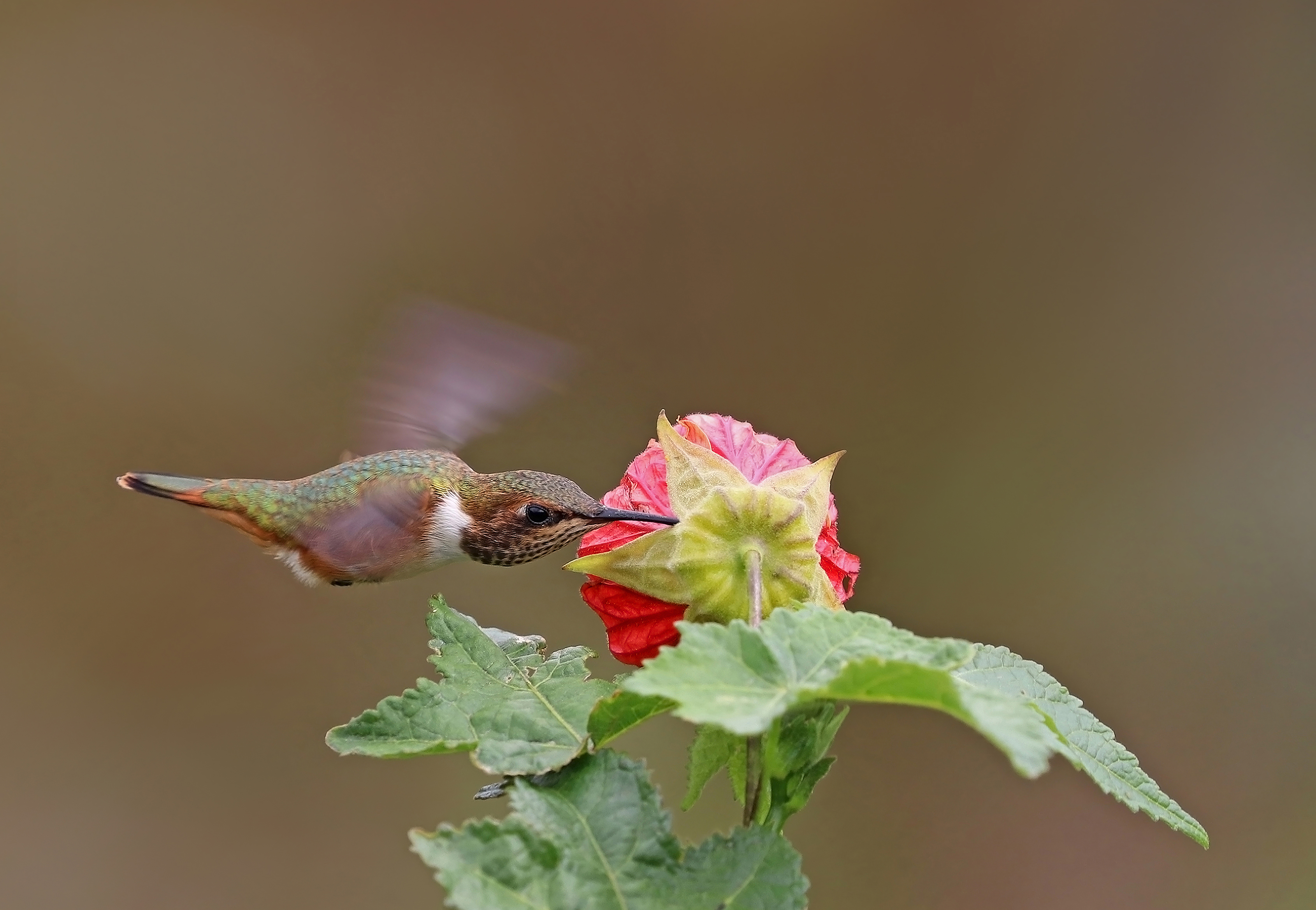
Feeding on Abutilon

=== Breeding ===
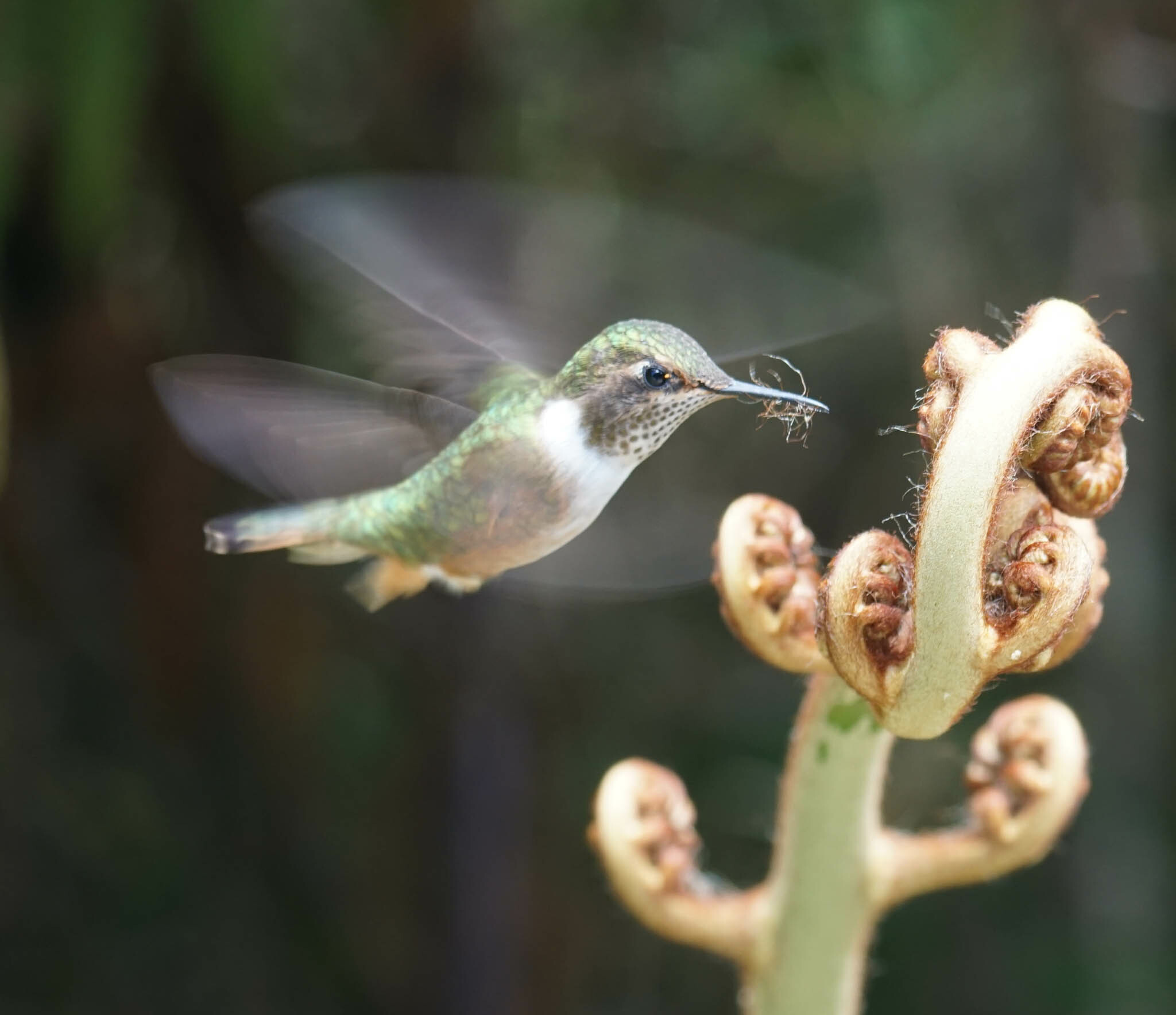
Collecting nesting material from a fiddlehead

The volcano hummingbird's breeding season spans from August or September to February. The male defends small territories that are independent of nectar resources though flowers are usually nearby, and makes dive displays directed at females. The female makes a cup nest of plant down and spider web covered with moss and lichens. It is placed at the outermost end of a twig, usually between 1 and 5 m (3 and 20 ft) above the ground. Nests are sometimes also attached to a rootly drooping from a projecting earth bank such as by a road. The incubation period and time to fledging are not known.

=== Vocal and non-vocal sounds ===
The volcano hummingbird makes "soft chip notes" while foraging. Males make "a thin whistled 'teeeeeuu'" whose purpose is not noted and "a twittering 'scolding'" call during agonistic encounters with other males. During the dive display the male's tail feathers make a series of broad-frequency pulses.

== Status ==
The IUCN has assessed the volcano hummingbird as being of Least Concern. It has a fairly large range and an apparently stable population between 20,000 and 50,000 mature individuals. All three subspecies occur in protected areas, and outside them they might benefit from human activity as they are more abundant in open areas than forest.
