= Central Bank of Costa Rica =

Central Bank of Costa Rica Banco Central de Costa Rica

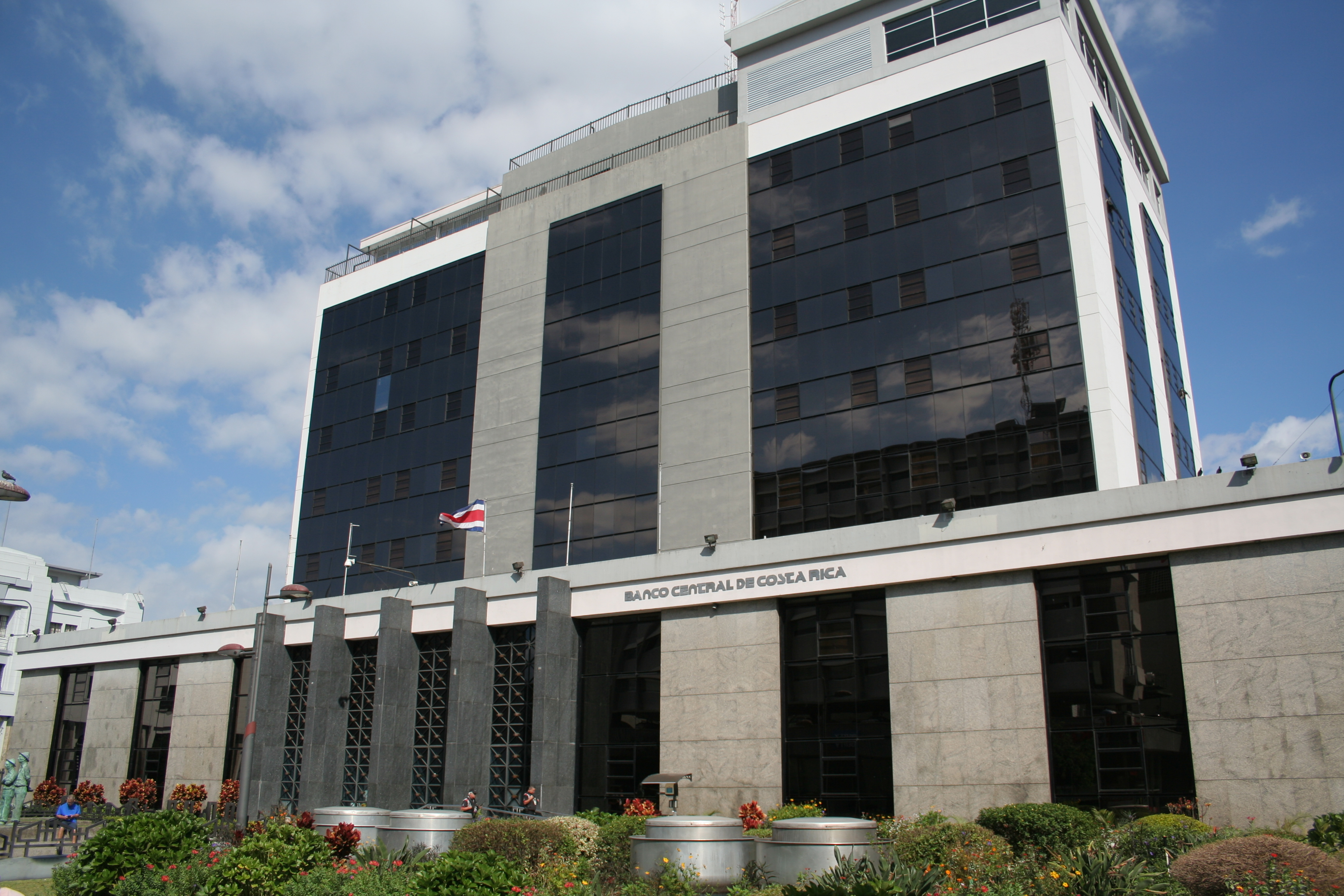
- The central building in 2023
- Central bank of: Costa Rica
- Headquarters: San José, Costa Rica
- Coordinates: 9°56′07.61″N 84°05′08.03″W
- Established: January 1950
- Ownership: 100% state ownership
- Governor: Róger Madrigal
- Currency: Costa Rican colón CRC (ISO 4217)
- Reserves: US$7.62 billion
- Website: www.bccr.fi.cr

The Central Bank of Costa Rica (Spanish: Banco Central de Costa Rica) or Banco Central de Costa Rica, is the central bank and primary monetary authority of Costa Rica. Its functions include maintaining inflation, supporting the government to make economic decisions, and implement the policies enacted by the government. The Central Bank of Costa Rica also maintains a substantial collection of pre-Columbian artifacts including coins, and visual arts.

== History ==
Before the establishment of a central bank, an adjunct office attached to Banco Nacional de Costa Rica handled the monetary and mint responsibilities. In 1948, private banks were nationalized. The Central Bank of Costa Rica was established in January 1950 taking over central banking functions previously shared by private commercial banks and the Banco Nacional de Costa Rica. The bank became a centralized monetary authority to manage the national banking system.

== Functions ==
The functions include maintaining inflation, supporting the government to make economic decisions, and implement the policies enacted by the government. It provides banking services to the Government of Costa Rica and other financial institutions. It is the monetary authority tasked with the issuing of the domestic currency (the Costa Rican colón). It also regulates commercial banks and other financial entities, and manages inter bank clearing of funds.

== Museums ==
The Central Bank maintains a collection of pre-Columbian artifacts including gold, coins, and national art and started establishing museums to exhibit them. The museums managed by the bank, exhibit and preserve these collections. The collections include more than 6500 objects exibhited in the Plaza de la Cultura in San José, which opened in 1982.

== Presidents ==
- Juan Dent Alvarado, January 1950 - December 1951
- Jaime Solera Bennett, January 1952 - May 1960
- Ángel Coronas Guardía, June 1960 - December 1960
- Max Gurdián Rojas, January 1961 - November 1962
- Carlos Manuel Escalante Durán, November 1962 - December 1964
- Rodolfo Lara Iraeta January 1965 - December 1967
- Jaime Solera Bennett, January 1968 - December 1969
- Juan Rafael Arias, January 1970 - November 1970
- Jorge Rossi Chavarría, November 1970 - May 1971
- Hernán Garrón Salazar, June 1971 - January 1972
- Claudio Alpízar Vargas, January 1972 - December 1972
- Bernal Jiménez Monge, January 1973 - September 1973
- Claudio Alpízar Vargas, January 1974 - September 1974
- Bernal Jiménez Monge, September 1974 - July 1977
- Porfirio Morera Batres, August 1977 - November 1977
- Juan José Arrea Escalante, December 1977 - May 1978
- Guillermo González Truque, May 1978 - January 1980
- Manuel Naranjo Coto, January 1980 - May 1982
- Carlos Manuel Castillo Morales, May 1982 - April 1984
- Marco Antonio López Agüero, April 1984 - September 1984
- Eduardo Lizano, September 1984 - May 1990
- Jorge Guardia Quirós, May 1990 - October 1993
- Jorge Corrales Quesada, October 1993 - May 1994
- Carlos Manuel Castillo Morales, May 1994 - March 1995
- Rodrigo Bolaños Zamora, March 1995 - May 1998
- Eduardo Lizano, May 1998 - November 2002
- Francisco de Paula Gutiérrez Gutiérrez, November 2002 - May 2010
- Rodrigo Bolaños Zamora, May 2010 - May 2014
- Olivier Castro Pérez, May 2014 - May 2018
- Rodrigo Cubero Brealey, May 2018 - May 2022
- Róger Madrigal López, May 2022 - Present

== See also ==
- Ministry of Finance (Costa Rica)
- BICSA
- Costa Rican colón
- Pre-Columbian Gold Museum
- Economy of Costa Rica
- List of central banks
- Americas Central Securities Depositories Association
