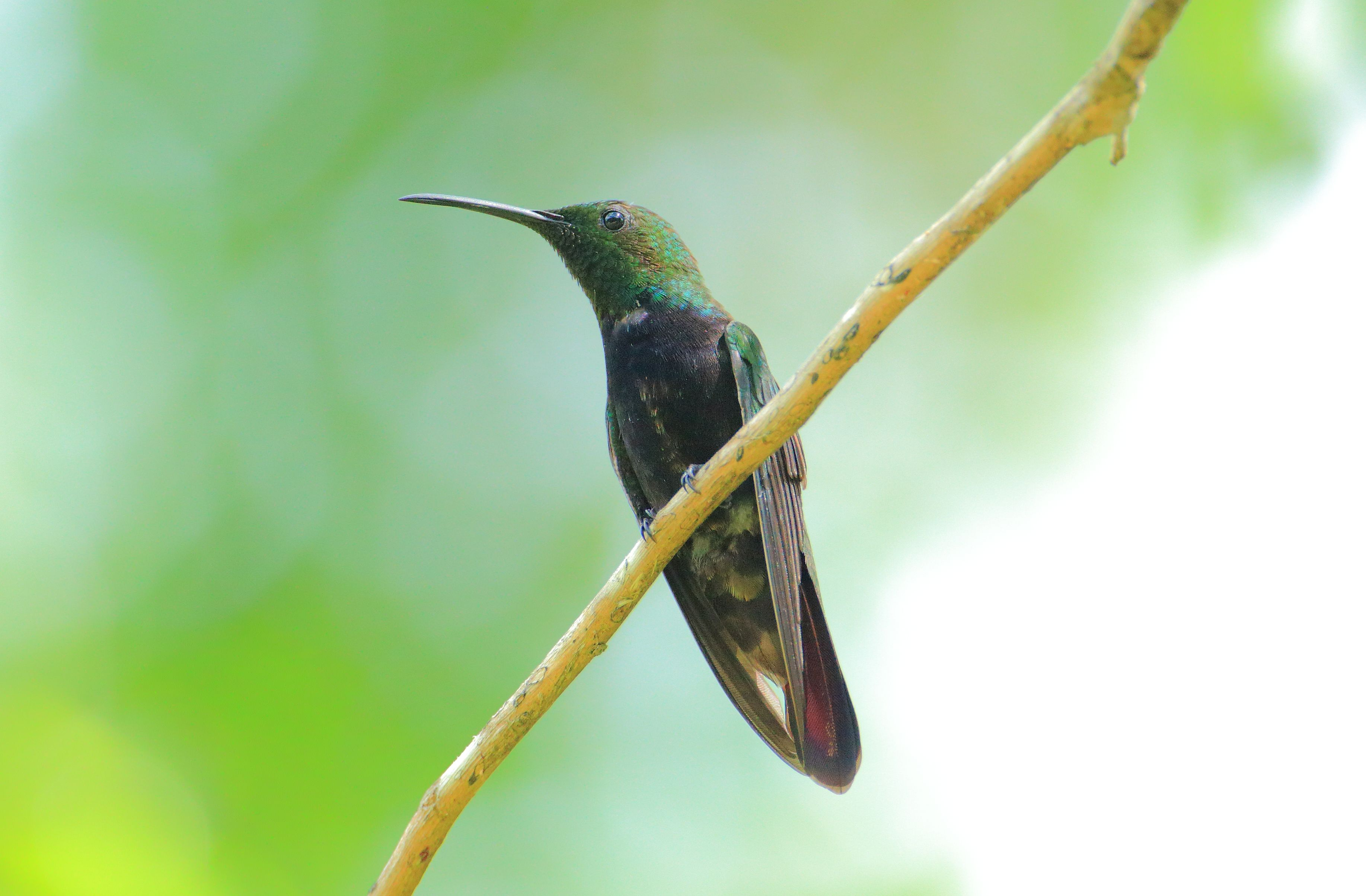

Conservation status
- Least Concern (IUCN 3.1)
- CITES Appendix II

Scientific classification
- Kingdom: Animalia
- Phylum: Chordata
- Class: Aves
- Order: Apodiformes
- Family: Trochilidae
- Genus: Riccordia
- Species: R. swainsonii

Binomial name
- Riccordia swainsonii (Lesson, 1829)

Synonyms
- Chlorostilbon swainsonii

= Hispaniolan emerald =

Species of hummingbird

The Hispaniolan emerald (Riccordia swainsonii) is a species of hummingbird in the "emeralds", tribe Trochilini of subfamily Trochilinae. It is endemic to the island of Hispaniola, which is shared by the Dominican Republic and Haiti.

== Taxonomy and systematics ==
The Hispaniolan emerald was formerly placed in the genus Chlorostilbon. Based on a molecular phylogenetic study published in 2014 and a 2017 publication, the North American Classification Committee of the American Ornithological Society, the International Ornithological Committee (IOC), and the Clements taxonomy moved it to the resurrected genus Riccordia. However, as of 2020 BirdLife International's Handbook of the Birds of the World (HBW) retained it in Chlorostilbon.

The Hispaniolan emerald is closely related to the Cuban emerald (Riccordia ricordii) and the Puerto Rican emerald (R. maugaeus). It is monotypic.

== Description ==
Male Hispaniolan emeralds are 9.5 to 10.5 cm (3.7 to 4.1 in) long and females 8.5 to 9.5 cm (3.3 to 3.7 in). The species weighs between 2.5 and 5 g (0.088 and 0.18 oz). Both sexes have a small white spot behind the eye. Males have a bill whose mandible is red and the maxilla black, and that is slightly decurved at the outer end. Its forehead, crown, and cheeks are dull dark brown; the rest of its upperparts and flanks are dark green with a bronze tinge and the uppertail coverts are dark green. Its throat is iridescent green with a large black patch below it. The rest of its underparts are a darker green than the upperparts with dark green undertail coverts. The tail is deeply forked and dark brown. The female's bill is more deeply decurved than the male's. Its head and upperparts are like the male's. Its underparts are gray that is darker on the belly and undertail coverts. The outermost pair of tail feathers have a gray base, a wide dark brown band near the end, and a white tip. The next pair inward is mostly dark grass green becoming black at the end. The inner three pairs are green.

== Distribution and habitat ==
The Hispaniolan emerald is found in both countries of its namesake island, the Dominican Republic and Haiti. It inhabits the interior and edges of dense montane rainforest, scrublands, and coffee plantations. In elevation it mostly ranges between 300 and 2,500 m (980 and 8,200 ft) but is found as low as sea level and occasionally higher than 3,000 m (9,800 ft).

== Behavior ==
=== Movement ===
The Hispaniolan emerald is generally sedentary. However, it occasionally wanders to high elevations and perhaps regularly moves to lower ones after the breeding season.

=== Feeding ===
The Hispaniolan emerald forages for nectar by trap-lining, visiting a circuit of flowering plants. It feeds anywhere from 3 to 18 m (10 to 60 ft) above the ground. In addition to nectar, it feeds on insects captured by hawking from a perch.

=== Breeding ===
The Hispaniolan emerald's breeding season extends from January to June and occasionally as late as August. It makes a cup nest of moss and plant fibers bound with spiderweb and covered with lichen. It often places it in shrubs within 2 m (7 ft) of the ground but sometimes as high as 10 m (30 ft). The female incubates the clutch of two eggs for 15 to 16 days and fledging occurs 20 to 22 days after hatch.

=== Vocalization ===
The Hispaniolan emerald makes "[s]harp metallic chipping notes", sometimes in a long series.

== Status ==
The IUCN has assessed the Hispaniolan emerald as being of Least Concern, though its population size and trend are not known. Though Hispaniola is a large island, the species is threatened by deforestation, especially in Haiti; however, it is confirmed to occur in at least two protected areas in that country. It "[r]eadily accepts man-made habitats as long as patches of forest remain."
