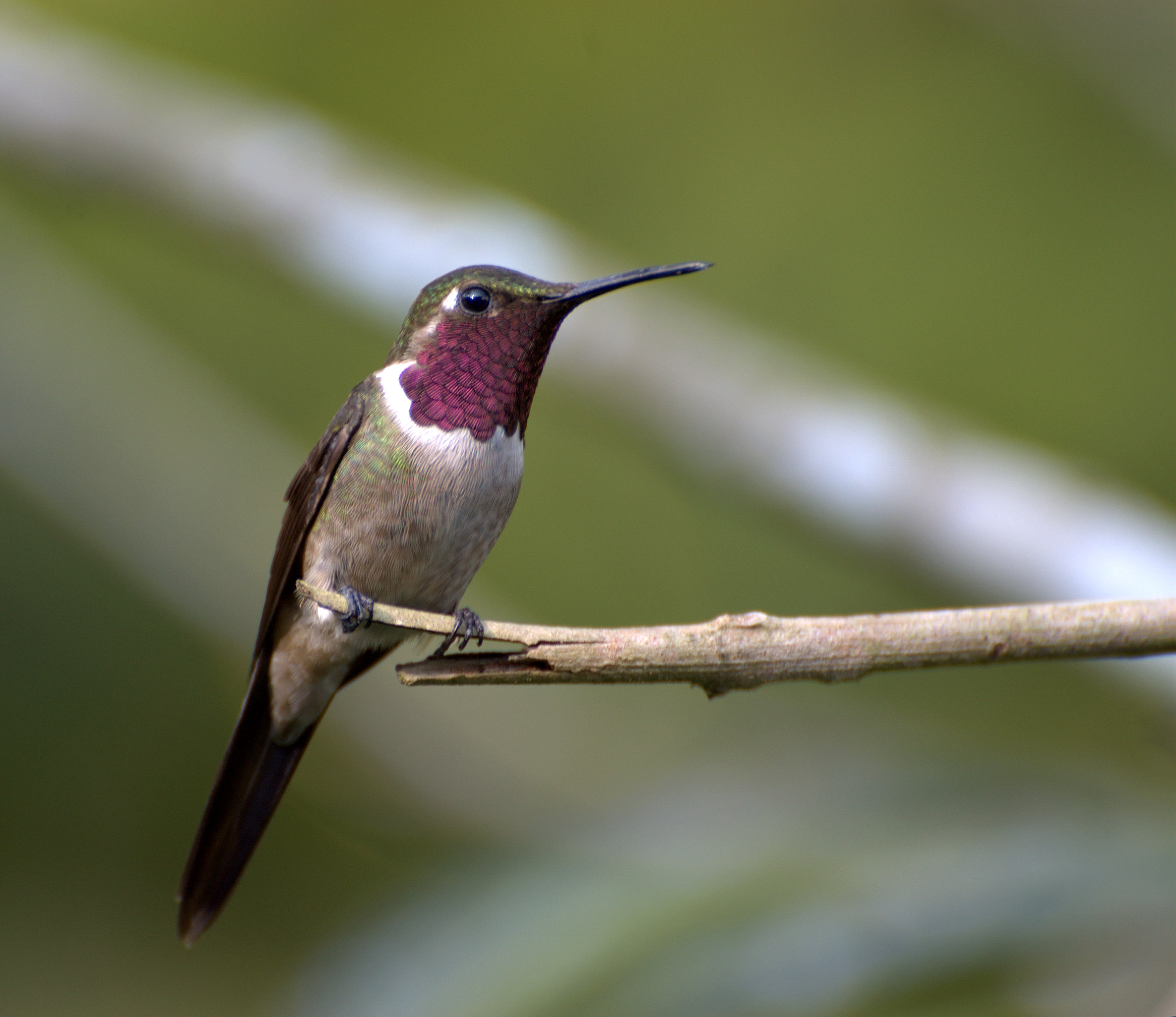

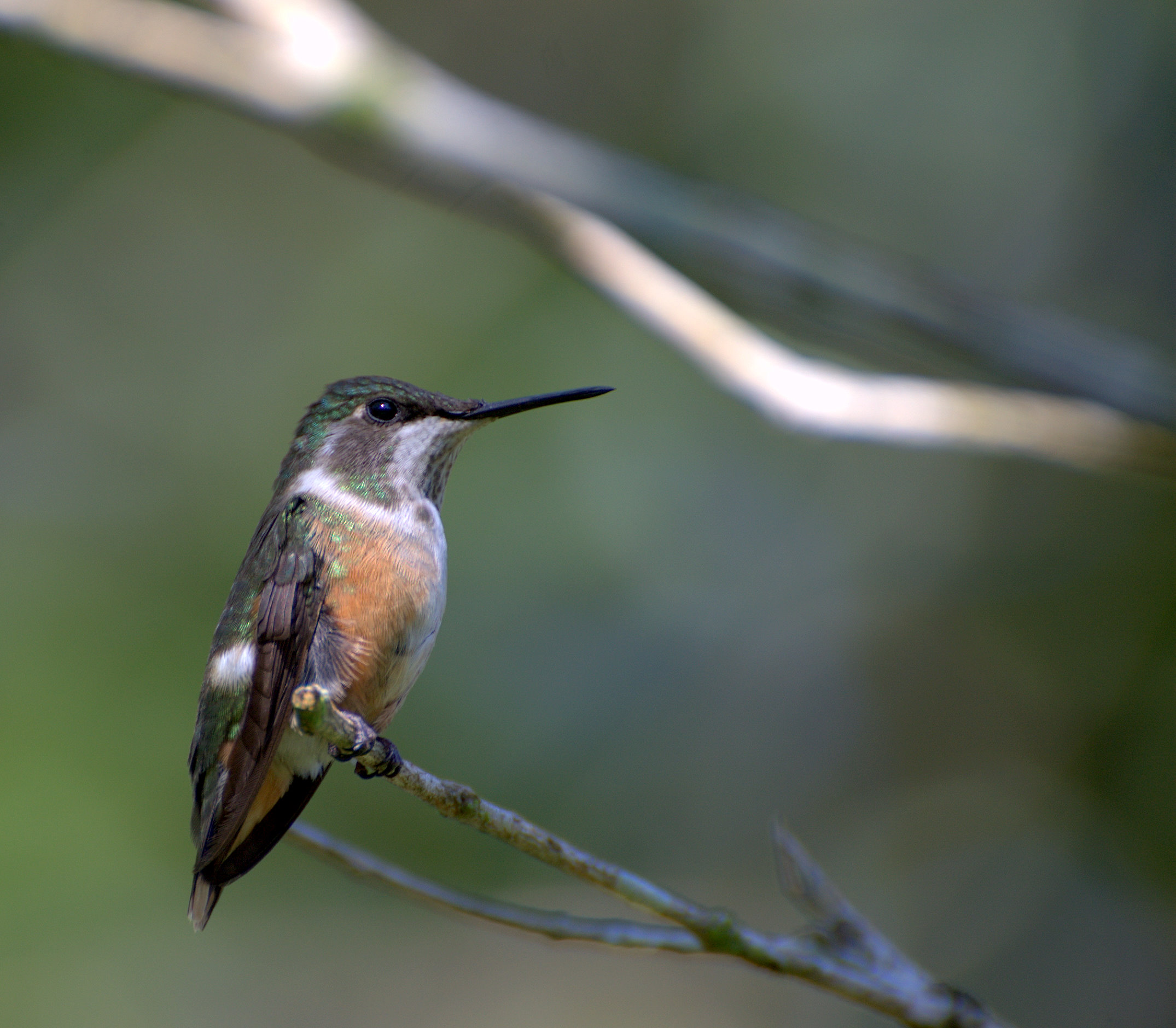
- male (above) and female (below)

Conservation status
- Least Concern (IUCN 3.1)
- CITES Appendix II

Scientific classification
- Kingdom: Animalia
- Phylum: Chordata
- Class: Aves
- Order: Apodiformes
- Family: Trochilidae
- Tribe: Mellisugini
- Genus: Calliphlox; F. Boie, 1831
- Species: C. amethystina

Binomial name
- Calliphlox amethystina (Boddaert, 1783)
- Range

= Amethyst woodstar =

Species of hummingbird

The amethyst woodstar (Calliphlox amethystina) is a species of hummingbird in tribe Mellisugini of subfamily Trochilinae, the "bee hummingbirds". It is found in every mainland South American country except Chile and Uruguay and has been recorded as a vagrant on Trinidad.

== Taxonomy and systematics ==
The South American Classification Committee of the American Ornithological Society, the International Ornithological Committee (IOC), and the Clements taxonomy consider the amethyst woodstar to be the only member of genus Calliphlox. However, BirdLife International's Handbook of the Birds of the World (HBW) also includes the magenta-throated woodstar (as C. bryantae) and purple-throated woodstar (as C. mitchellii) in that genus. The other three taxonomies assign them to genus Philodice. The species is monotypic.

The amethyst woodstar was described by the French polymath Georges-Louis Leclerc, Comte de Buffon in 1781 in his Histoire Naturelle des Oiseaux. The bird was also illustrated in a hand-colored plate engraved by François-Nicolas Martinet in the Planches Enluminées D'Histoire Naturelle which was produced under the supervision of Edme-Louis Daubenton to accompany Buffon's text. Neither the plate caption nor Buffon's description included a scientific name but in 1783 the Dutch naturalist Pieter Boddaert coined the binomial name Trochilus amethystinus in his catalogue of the Planches Enluminées. The type locality is Cayenne in French Guiana. The amethyst woodstar is now placed in the genus Calliphlox that was introduced by the German zoologist Friedrich Boie in 1831. The generic name is derived from the Ancient Greek kalliphlox meaning "beautifully blazing". The specific epithet is Latin for "amethyst-colored".

The genus Calliphlox, which presently only contains C. amethystina, formerly also had several other species classified within it; the Bahama woodstar, Inagua woodstar, purple-throated woodstar, and magenta-throated woodstar. However, a molecular phylogenetic study of the hummingbird family published in 2014 found that Calliphlox was polyphyletic. The polyphyly was confirmed in 2017 by a more detailed study restricted to species in tribe Mellisugini. Based on these results, the genus Nesophlox was resurrected for the Bahama woodstar and the Inagua woodstar. Later, the genus Philodice was resurrected to accommodate the purple-throated woodstar and the magenta-throated woodstar. However, as noted above, HBW retains those two in Calliphlox.

A hummingbird originally described as Calliphlox iridescens and later named Smaragdochrysis iridescens is now believed to be a hybrid between the amethyst woodstar and the glittering-bellied emerald (Chlorostilbon lucidus).

== Description ==
The amethyst woodstar is 6 to 8.4 cm (2.4 to 3.3 in) long and weighs 3.2 to 2.5 g (0.11 to 0.088 oz). Both sexes have a medium length, straight, black bill. They have dark bronzy green upperparts with a large white spot on either side of the rump. Males have a small white spot behind the eye while females have a thin white stripe. Males in breeding plumage have an iridescent amethyst gorget with a whitish band below it. The rest of the underparts are greenish with brownish lower flanks. Its deeply forked tail is purplish black with green tips to the feathers. Males in non-breeding (eclipse) plumage have a pale throat with some iridescent disks. Females have whitish underparts with a few green spangles on the throat and rufous flanks and undertail coverts. The tail is short and dull green with a black band near the end and pale tips to the feathers.

== Distribution and habitat ==
The amethyst woodstar is found from eastern Colombia through Venezuela and the Guianas into most of Brazil except the main Amazon basin as far south as extreme northeastern Argentina, and from there west and north into Paraguay and through Bolivia, Peru, and Ecuador slightly into southern Colombia. It inhabits a wide variety of semi-open to open landscapes including the borders of humid forest, clearings within forest, savanna, and scrubby woodland. It shuns the interior of closed forest. In elevation it ranges from sea level to 1,500 m (4,900 ft).

== Behavior ==
=== Movement ===
The amethyst woodstar's movements are very poorly understood. It is thought to be generally sedentary. However, it is known only between January and July in the Chapada Diamantina of Brazil's Bahia state, and in some parts of Venezuela has records only between August and January.

=== Feeding ===
The amethyst woodstar forages in low bushes and small trees, collecting nectar from a very wide variety of flowering plants. It is known to feed at plants of more than 30 genera. In addition to nectar, it also feeds on insects captured by hawking from a perch. It is dominated by most other hummingbirds.

=== Breeding ===
The amethyst woodstar's breeding season in eastern Brazil spans from November to April; it has not been defined elsewhere. The female builds a cup nest from soft plant material and decorates the outside with lichen. It is typically placed on a horizontal branch within vegetation. The female incubates the clutch of two eggs for 13 to 14 days and fledging occurs 20 to 22 days after hatch.

=== Vocalization ===
Very few recordings of the amethyst woodstar's vocalizations are known. Its song has not been described. Its call is a "low, very sharp rattle, like 'trr'."

== Status ==
The IUCN has assessed the amethyst woodstar as being of Least Concern, though its population size is not known and is believed to be decreasing. It is common in much of its range but uncommon to rare around its periphery such as in Colombia, Venezuela, and Peru. It readily accepts human-altered landscapes such as gardens and parks.
