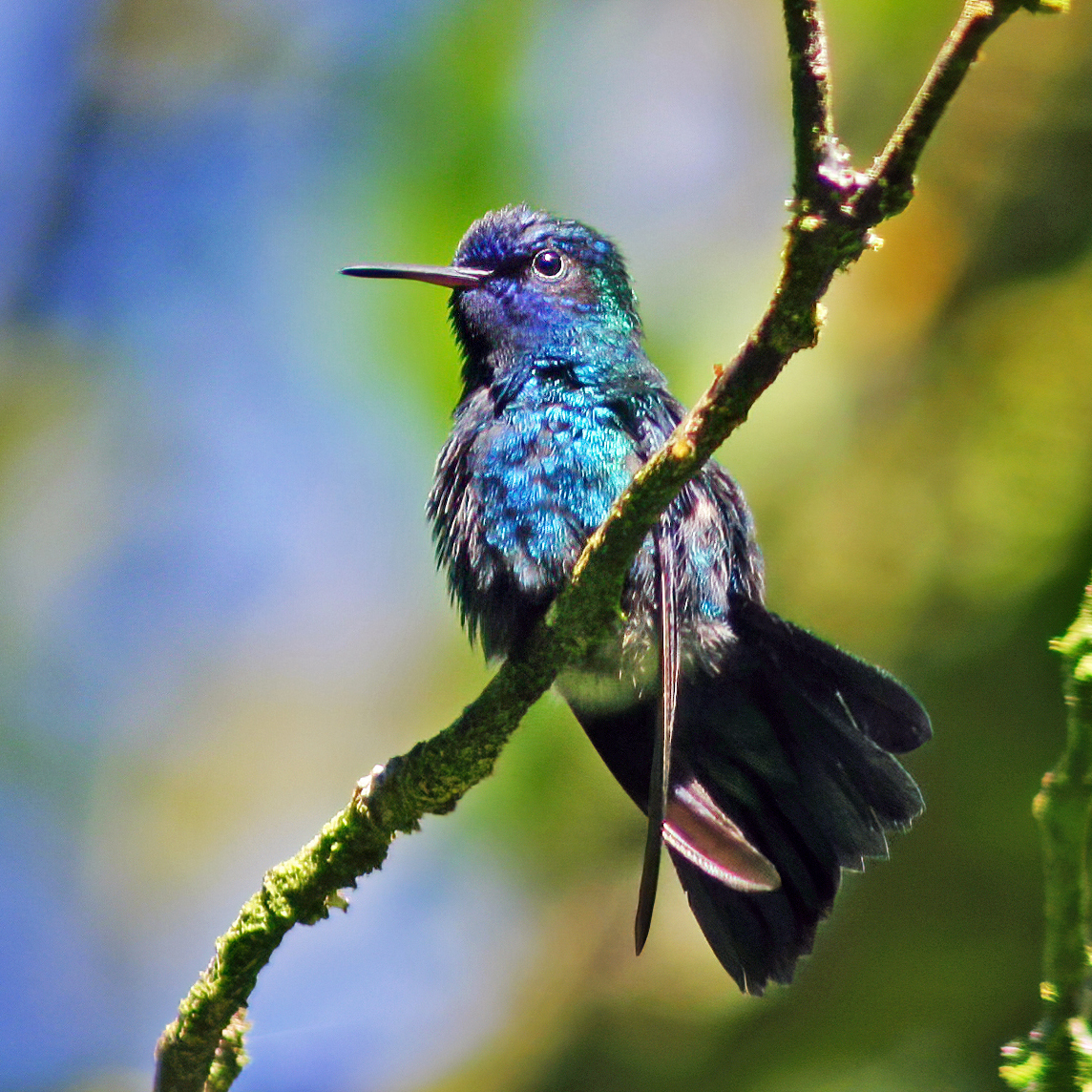
- Blue-headed hummingbird in Morne Diablotin National Park, Dominica

Conservation status
- Near Threatened (IUCN 3.1)
- CITES Appendix II

Scientific classification
- Kingdom: Animalia
- Phylum: Chordata
- Class: Aves
- Order: Apodiformes
- Family: Trochilidae
- Genus: Riccordia
- Species: R. bicolor

Binomial name
- Riccordia bicolor (Gmelin, JF, 1788)

Synonyms
- Cyanophaia bicolor

= Blue-headed hummingbird =

Species of bird

The blue-headed hummingbird (Riccordia bicolor) is a hummingbird of the genus Riccordia. It is exclusively found on the islands of Dominica and Martinique in the Lesser Antilles in forests along rivers. The males and females have distinct appearances; the female has a white front, and her back and wings are iridescent bronze-green colored. The male is entirely emerald of varying shades, with an especially blue head. The blue-headed hummingbird's behavior is typical of most hummingbirds, mostly feeding off of nectar. It nests from February to May in tree ferns, incubating a clutch of two white eggs for 16 to 18 days. It is a near-threatened species, with an estimated mature population of 25,000–150,000.

== Taxonomy and systematics ==
The blue-headed hummingbird was formally described in 1788 by the German naturalist Johann Friedrich Gmelin in his revised and expanded edition of Carl Linnaeus's Systema Naturae. He placed it with all the other hummingbirds in the genus Trochilus and coined the binomial name Trochilus bicolor. Gmelin based his description on "Le saphir-ésmeraude" (lit. 'The sapphire-emerald') that been described in 1779 by the French polymath Georges-Louis Leclerc, Comte de Buffon in Histoire Naturelle des Oiseaux. Buffon believed his specimen had come from Guadeloupe but this was an error for Dominica.

The blue-headed hummingbird was formerly the only species placed in the genus Cyanophaia. A molecular phylogenetic study published in 2014 found that Cyanophaia was nested within the resurrected genus Riccordia. Based on that study and others, the North American Classification Committee of the American Ornithological Society, the International Ornithological Committee (IOC), and the Clements taxonomy merged it into Riccordia. However, as of 2020 BirdLife International's Handbook of the Birds of the World (HBW) retained it in Cyanophaia.

The genus Riccordia had originally been introduced in 1854 by the German ornithologist Ludwig Reichenbach with the Cuban emerald as the type species. Reichenbach based the genus name on the specific epithet of the type species recordii, which had been chosen by Paul Gervais to honour the French surgeon-naturalist Alexandre Ricord. The specific name bicolor is Latin meaning "two-colored". The blue-headed hummingbird has no subspecies.

== Description ==
The blue-headed hummingbird is a medium-sized hummingbird at 9.4–9.9 cm (3.7–3.9 in) in length and 3.9–4.7 g (0.14–0.17 oz) in weight. On average, the bill (measuring along the culmen) is 17 mm (0.67 in), each wing is 59 mm (2.3 in) long, and the tail is 37.2 mm (1.46 in) in length. Its iris is dark brown but may appear black due to lighting, and the skin around its eyes are dark gray. Its legs are slightly larger compared to other hummingbirds but are otherwise typical, small and weak. It is sexually dimorphic; the female is slightly smaller compared to the male, and each gender's plumage is different.

The female blue-headed hummingbird is iridescent; from behind she is a shiny, bronze-like green that appears indigo from certain angles. Her throat and neck are whitish. Her largest flight feathers (the primaries and secondaries) are black and lose their glossiness with wear. Her tail feathers (rectrices) have a detailed pattern: the center two feathers are the same metallic green as her back with darker fringes, but the remaining four feathers on both sides are dark green to black and terminate with a white or gray tip that become broader farther from the center, and the outermost two feathers on each side are especially broad, resulting in a stepped appearance. The underside of her tail feathers and her belly are gray with green spots on the fringes. The sides of her head and especially the area around her eyes are darker, and the top of her head is markedly more cyan compared to the rest of her body.

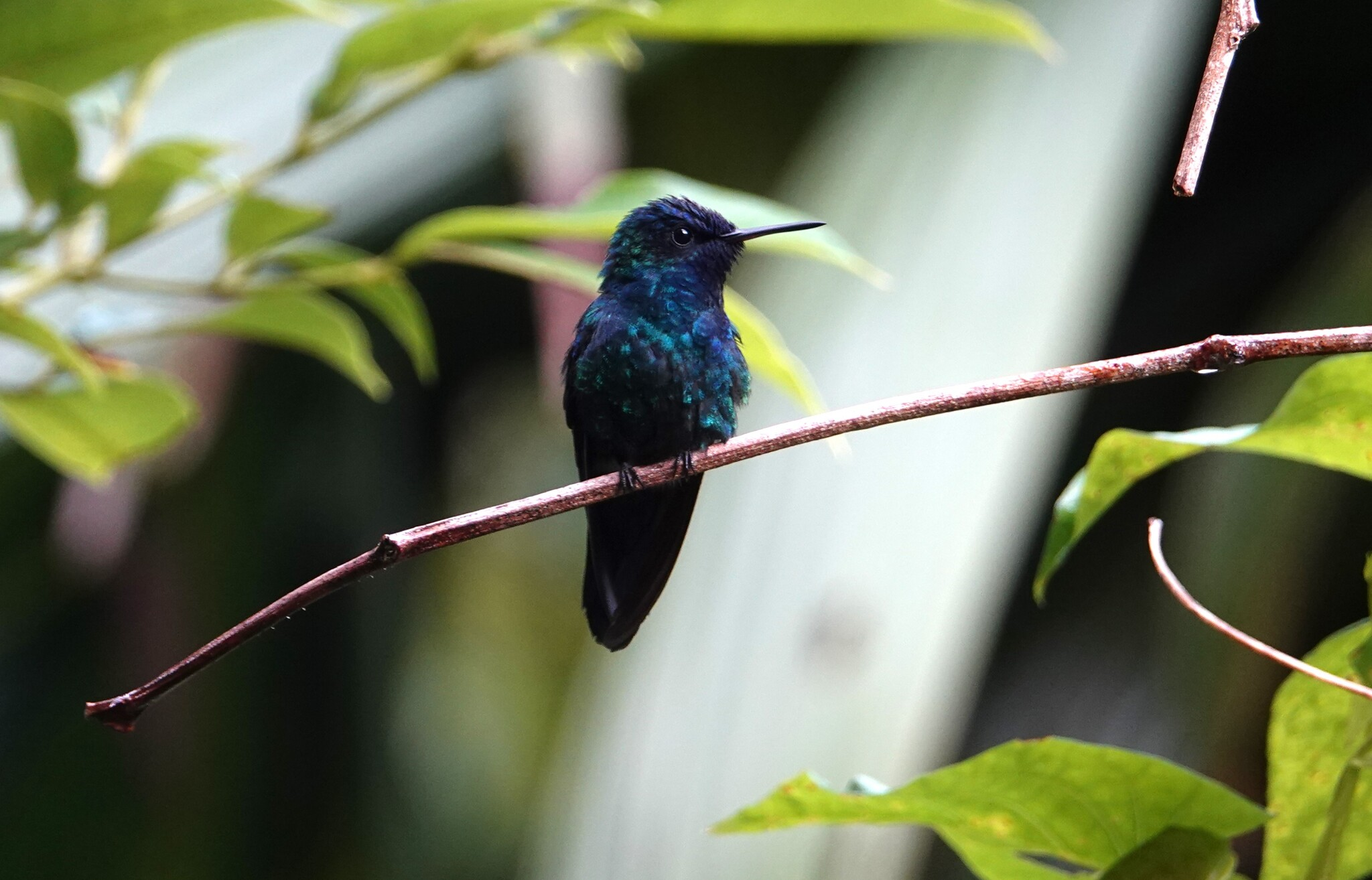
A male blue-headed hummingbird

The male is strikingly different from the female. He is almost entirely an iridescent green-blue color of different shades, except for the feathers around his thighs, which are white to grayish. At certain angles (especially the back of the head, the lower back, the rump, and the breast) his feathers appear especially vivid and blue. His head and throat are a vivid azure, as is his tail feathers and underparts. His largest flight feathers are similar to that of the female but exaggerated, with a slight violet sheen when fresh. The underside of his wing is much duller in comparison, largely colored black, although the feathers nearest to the head (the underwing lesser and median coverts) are a much more vibrant bright green bronze.

The juvenile blue-headed hummingbird strongly resembles the adult, however, it is generally duller in color, its bill is shorter and not decurved, and its tail and wing feathers are smaller. The juvenile female's upperparts do not look as indigo from some angles, and her tail feathers have much whiter tips. Unlike the adult, who has an entirely black beak, the juvenile male's lower beak is a bright pink that may be tipped black. His tail feathers are also less azure and more of a dusky blue.

=== Similar species ===
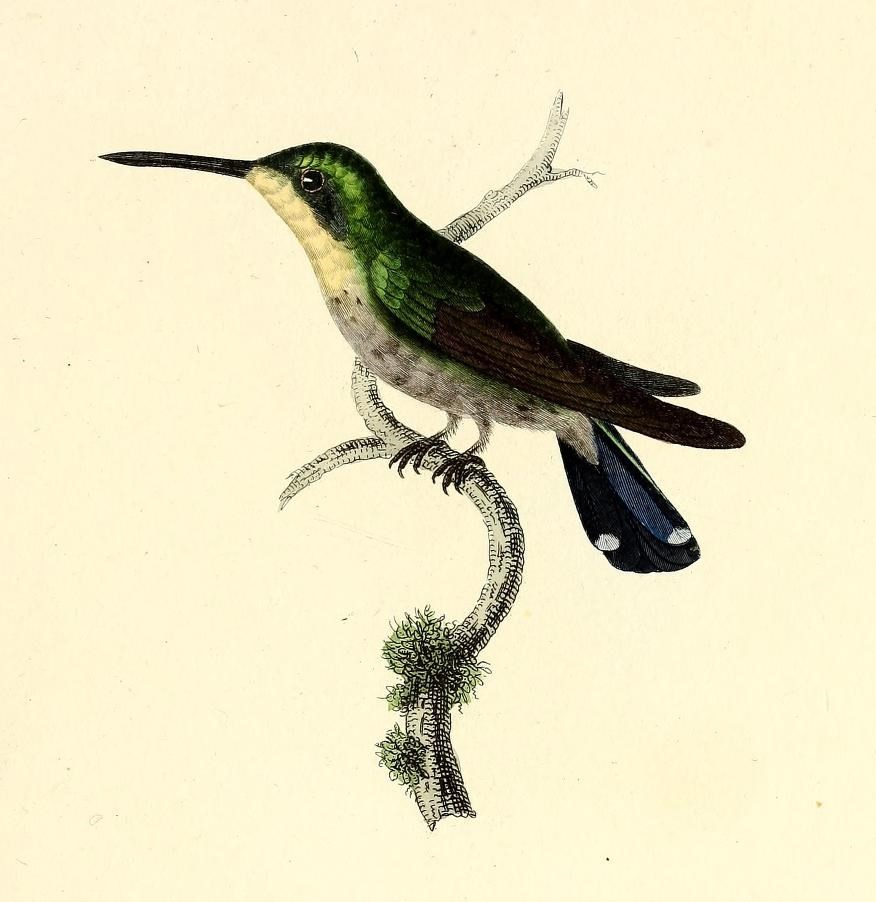
An illustration of a female blue-headed hummingbird

The blue-headed hummingbird is largely distinct in its range. A female blue-headed may look similar to the female Antillean crested hummingbird, which also has a white breast and chin with gray underparts; however it can be distinguished from the blue-crested by its shorter bill and eponymous crest. The male blue-crested hummingbird may look black in poor lighting, making it hard to distinguish from the male purple-throated and green-throated caribs, however, unlike the blue-crested hummingbird, the wings of the two caribs are usually much brighter than the rest of the body, their bills are longer with a downwards curve, and they are larger in size.

== Distribution and habitat ==
The blue-headed hummingbird exclusively present on the islands of Dominica and Martinique in central Lesser Antilles, between 500–1,200 meters above sea level, although they are the most numerous between 800–1,000 m. It inhabits undisturbed forests and secondary forest along rivers. It is sedentary, meaning that it does not migrate at all.

== Behavior ==
Little is known of the blue-headed hummingbird's behaviors, but it can be assumed that they are mostly similar to other Lesser Antillean hummingbirds.

=== Feeding ===
Typical of all hummingbirds, the blue-headed hummingbird forages for nectar from a variety of flowering plants and trees. It feeds up to six meters above the ground. In addition to nectar it feeds on arthropods captured by hawking from a perch, especially over streams, and also gleans them from leaves.

=== Breeding ===
The blue-headed hummingbird breeds from February to May. Its nest is a cup 58 mm (2.3 in) tall and 47 mm (1.9 in) in diameter, made of assorted plant material, often lined with kapok tree fluff, and usually attached to a nearby twig with cobwebs. It is placed on horizontal twigs or tree fern fronds between 1–4 m (3.3–13.1 ft) above the ground. Its eggs are small at 13.5 by 8.6 mm (0.53 by 0.34 in) in size, and they are white in color. The female incubates the clutch of two eggs for 16 to 18 days; fledging occurs 20 to 23 days after hatch.

=== Vocalization ===
The blue-headed hummingbird's calls are similar to those of other small hummingbirds, and include "shrill, metallic notes, rapidly descending in pitch, and a metallic 'click-click-click'."

== Conservation and ecology ==
BirdLife International, which provides the IUCN conservation status for birds, classifies the blue-headed hummingbird as near-threatened due to climate change and the resulting severe weather. The blue-headed hummingbird is common in its habitat, albeit sporadically distributed; estimates for population density have varied greatly. In a 1996 survey of Martinique, it was found to be the seventh most common bird of the entire island with an estimated density of 350–770 per square kilometer. In a 2021 study, the population density was estimated to be 3–4 per square kilometer. This discrepancy may be caused by the 2021 study being excessively cautious, and the 1996 survey is likely the more accurate figure for higher altitudes, and as such the global population is estimated to be 25,000–150,000 mature individuals.

Hurricane Maria in 2017 resulted in 18% of tree cover being lost in Dominica, coinciding with a heavy decrease in blue-headed hummingbird abundance, however, on Guadeloupe other hummingbird species have successfully recovered from Hurricane Hugo, which, along with the high frequency of cyclones in the Lesser Antilles, suggests that the blue-headed hummingbird may be naturally resistant to cyclones.
