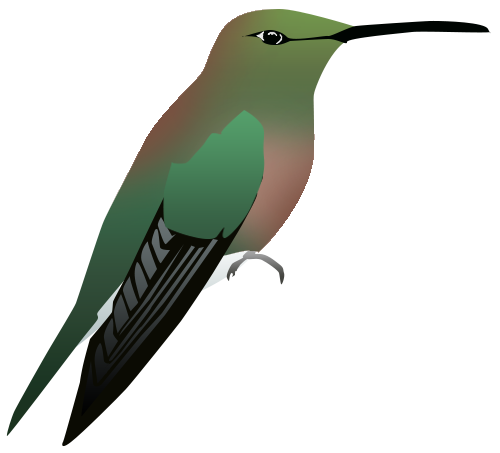
- Artist rendition

Conservation status
- Extinct (1877) (IUCN 3.1)
- CITES Appendix II

Scientific classification
- Kingdom: Animalia
- Phylum: Chordata
- Class: Aves
- Clade: Strisores
- Order: Apodiformes
- Family: Trochilidae
- Genus: Riccordia
- Species: †R. bracei

Binomial name
- †Riccordia bracei (Lawrence, 1877)

= Brace's emerald =

Extinct species of bird

Brace's emerald (Riccordia bracei) is an extinct species of hummingbird which was endemic to the main island of the Bahamas, New Providence.

== Description ==
Its weight was 0.43 oz (12 g) its wingspan was 9.25 in (23.5 cm);its length was 5.5 in (14 cm) and the length of its tail was 2.5 in (6.4 cm). The black bill was slightly straight and short. The legs and feet were black. The back exhibited a slaty blue hue with a black gleam. The head was similarly coloured to the back, with the absence of the black gloss. Directly behind the eyes was a white eyebrow. The throat was white. The abdomen had white feathers with black and yellow splotches. The wings exhibited a bluish hue with white wingbars. The rectrices were blackish. The crissum (the undertail covert which surrounded the cloacal opening) was white with a faint yellow hue at the edges.

== Status and extinction ==
For more than a hundred years, Brace's emerald was only known by the type specimen, one single male which was shot by bird collector Lewis J. K. Brace on July 13, 1877, around three miles (4.8 kilometres) away from Nassau on the island of New Providence. The skin (which is unfortunately heavily damaged at the throat) is now at the Smithsonian Institution in Washington, D.C. The species was long ignored by ornithological authorities. In 1880, it was listed without commentary as a synonym of the Cuban emerald (Riccordia ricordii).

Not until the 1930s was the unique status of the holotype even recognized, as it was seen as an aberrant specimen of the Cuban emerald that had become a vagrant to New Providence. American ornithologist James Bond was the first to discuss the differences between R. ricordii and R. bracei. In 1945, he split R. ricordii and regarded R. ricordii bracei as a new subspecies. In contrast to the Cuban species, the specimen from New Providence was smaller, had a longer bill and a different plumage.

In 1982, palaeornithologists William Hilgartner and Storrs Olson discovered fossil remains of three hummingbird species from the Pleistocene in the deposits in a cave of New Providence. These were the Bahama woodstar (Nesophlox evelynae), Cuban emerald (R. ricordii; also R. elegans), and another species, which was later identified as Riccordia bracei. This provided evidence that Brace had discovered a new hummingbird species which lived on New Providence since the Pleistocene. It formed a relict population, and most likely due to habitat loss and human disturbance (e.g. agriculture), it became extinct at the end of the 19th century. Both R. bracei and R. elegans are listed as extinct on the 2024 IUCN Red List as extinct species.
