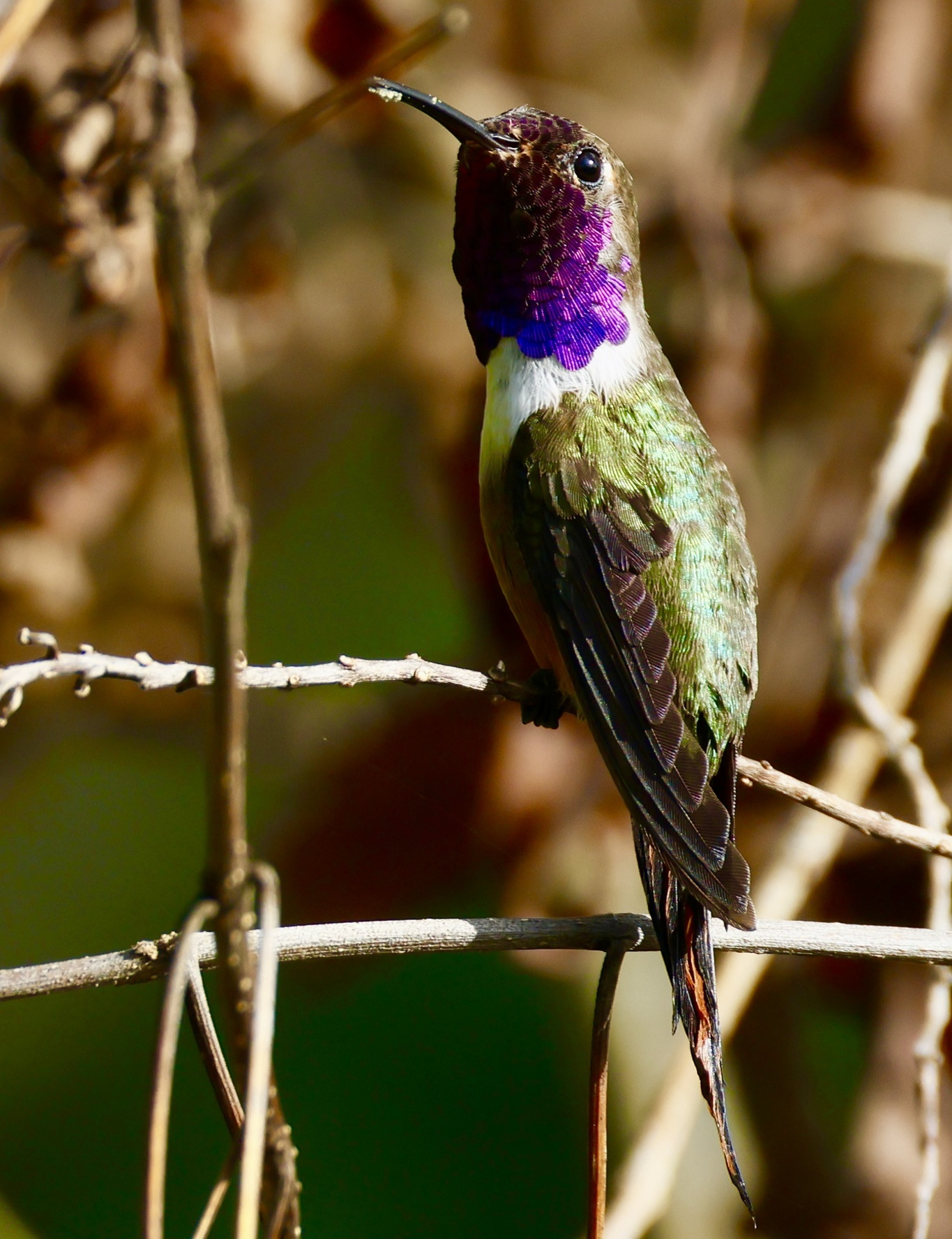

Conservation status
- Least Concern (IUCN 3.1)
- CITES Appendix II

Scientific classification
- Kingdom: Animalia
- Phylum: Chordata
- Class: Aves
- Order: Apodiformes
- Family: Trochilidae
- Genus: Nesophlox
- Species: N. lyrura

Binomial name
- Nesophlox lyrura (Gould, 1869)

Synonyms
- Nesophlox evelynae lyrura

= Inagua woodstar =

Species of hummingbird

The Inagua woodstar (Nesophlox lyrura), also called the lyre-tailed hummingbird, is a species of hummingbird in tribe Mellisugini of subfamily Trochilinae, the "bee hummingbirds". It is endemic to the two islands of the Inagua district of the Bahamas.

== Taxonomy and systematics ==
The Inagua woodstar was originally treated as a subspecies of the Bahama woodstar (Nesophlox evelynae), which for a time was placed in the genus Calliphlox. Following a 2015 publication, the Committee on Classification and Nomenclature of the then American Ornithologists' Union recognized the Inagua woodstar as a separate species and the major worldwide taxonomic systems followed suit. A molecular phylogenetic study published in 2014 found that the genus Calliphlox was polyphyletic. Following that study and a 2017 publication, taxonomists moved the Inagua and Bahama woodstars into the resurrected genus Nesophlox.

The Inagua woodstar is monotypic.

== Description ==
The Inagua woodstar is 7.8 to 8.2 cm (3.1 to 3.2 in) long and weighs 2.1 to 2.7 g (0.074 to 0.095 oz). Both sexes have a short, slightly decurved, black bill and a small white spot behind the eye. The male's forehead and gorget are glittering reddish purple. Its upperparts are iridescent green, the breast whitish, and the belly mixed rufous and green. The tail is very deeply forked. Its central feathers are green and the others have cinnamon-rufous inner webs. The outermost feathers are lyre-shaped. Females have dull green upperparts, pale gray chin and throat with small green spots, a whitish chest, and a rufous belly. Their tail is rounded; the central feathers are green and the rest cinnamon with a wide black band near the end.

== Distribution and habitat ==
The Inagua woodstar is found on Great and Little Inagua islands in the Bahama archipelago. It inhabits most of the landscapes of the islands with the probable exception of mangroves. These include dune scrub, freshwater riparian areas, and human-made parks and gardens.

== Behavior ==
=== Movement ===
The Inagua woodstar is assumed to be sedentary but for movements in response to where flowers are blooming. However, there are a few records of vagrant Bahama woodstars in Florida and Cuba from before the split that were not identified at the subspecies level, so it is possible that some were of this species.

=== Feeding ===
The Inagua woodstar forages for nectar at a variety of native and introduced flowering plants. Both sexes defend small territories around good nectar sources. In addition to nectar, the species also feeds on small insects captured by hawking from a perch.

=== Breeding ===
The Inagua woodstar's breeding season has not been defined but seems to include October. It makes a tiny cup nest of plant fiber and spiderweb lined with soft fibers and covered with small pieces of bark. It generally places it within 1 and 3 m (3 and 10 ft) of the ground. Nothing else is known about the species' breeding phenology.

=== Vocalization ===
As of July 2022, neither the Cornell Lab of Ornithology's Macaulay Library nor xeno-canto have recordings of the Inagua woodstar's vocalizations. Its song is described as quiet and simple, "sounding like wet, squeaking shoes". It also makes "chip" calls.

== Status ==
The IUCN has assessed the Inagua woodstar as being of Least Concern. Though it has a small range and its population size is not known, the latter is believed to be stable. No specific threats have been identified, but because the islands are so low-lying, the potential is there for major habitat destruction and direct mortality by a hurricane.
