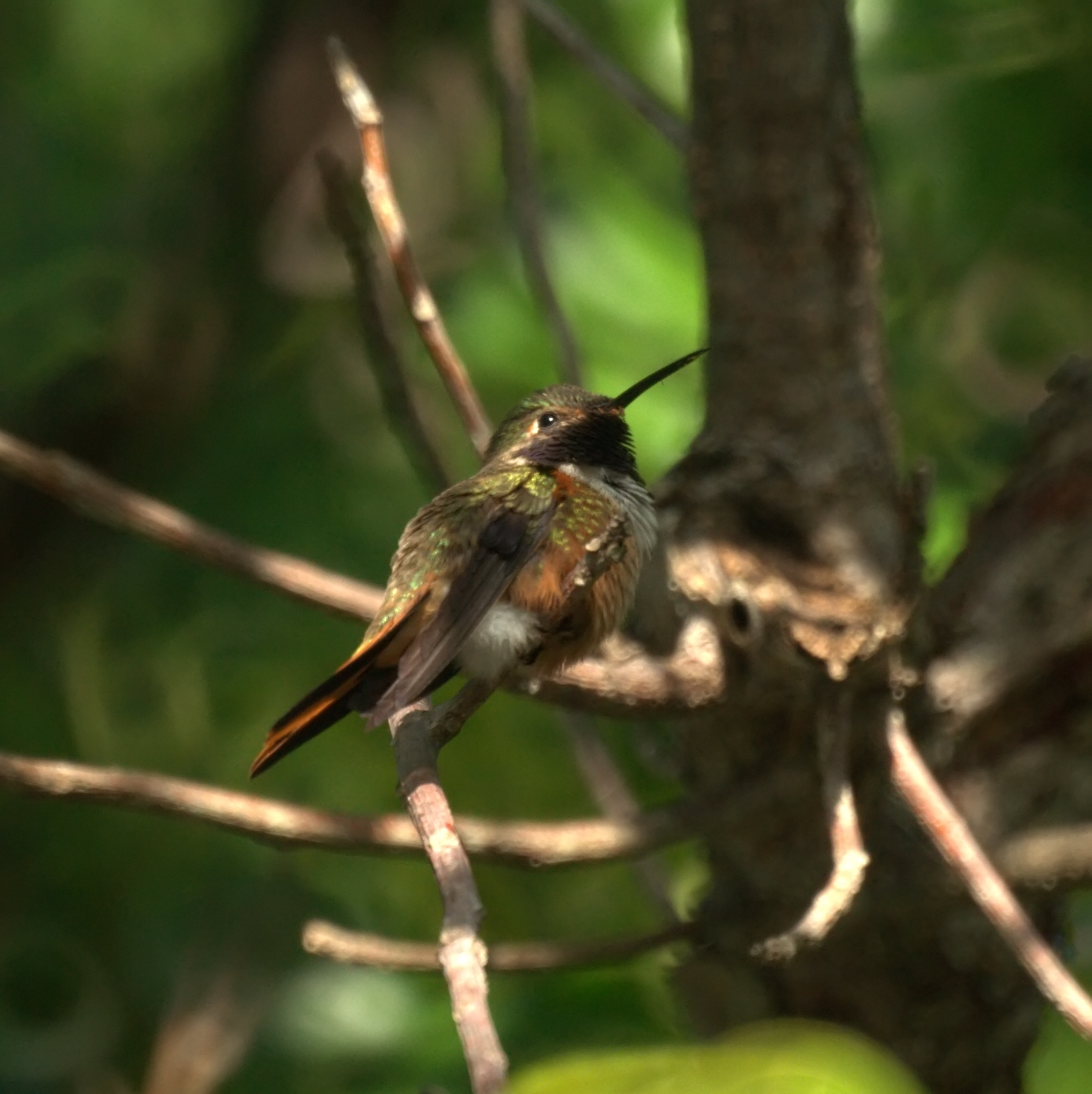
- Bahama woodstar, (Nesophlox evelynae)

Scientific classification
- Kingdom: Animalia
- Phylum: Chordata
- Class: Aves
- Order: Apodiformes
- Family: Trochilidae
- Tribe: Mellisugini
- Genus: Nesophlox; Ridgway, 1910

Species
- 2, see text

Synonyms
- Calliphlox

= Nesophlox =

Genus of birds

Nesophlox is a genus in the family of Hummingbirds. It consists of two endemic hummingbirds of the Bahamas.

== Species ==
The genus contains two species:

Genus Nesophlox – Ridgway, 1910 – two species
Common name	Scientific name and subspecies	Range	Size and ecology	IUCN status and estimated population
Bahama woodstar	Nesophlox evelynae (Bourcier, 1847)	Bahama and Turks and Caicos islands	Size: Habitat: Diet:	LC
Inagua woodstar	Nesophlox lyrura (Gould, 1869)	Inagua in the Bahamas.	Size: Habitat: Diet:	LC

These species were formerly placed in the genus Calliphlox. Molecular phylogenetic studies published in 2014 and 2017 found that the genus Calliphlox was polyphyletic. In the revised classification to create monophyletic genera, the Bahama woodstar and the Inagua woodstar were moved to the resurrected genus Nesophlox that had been introduced by Robert Ridgway in 1910.
