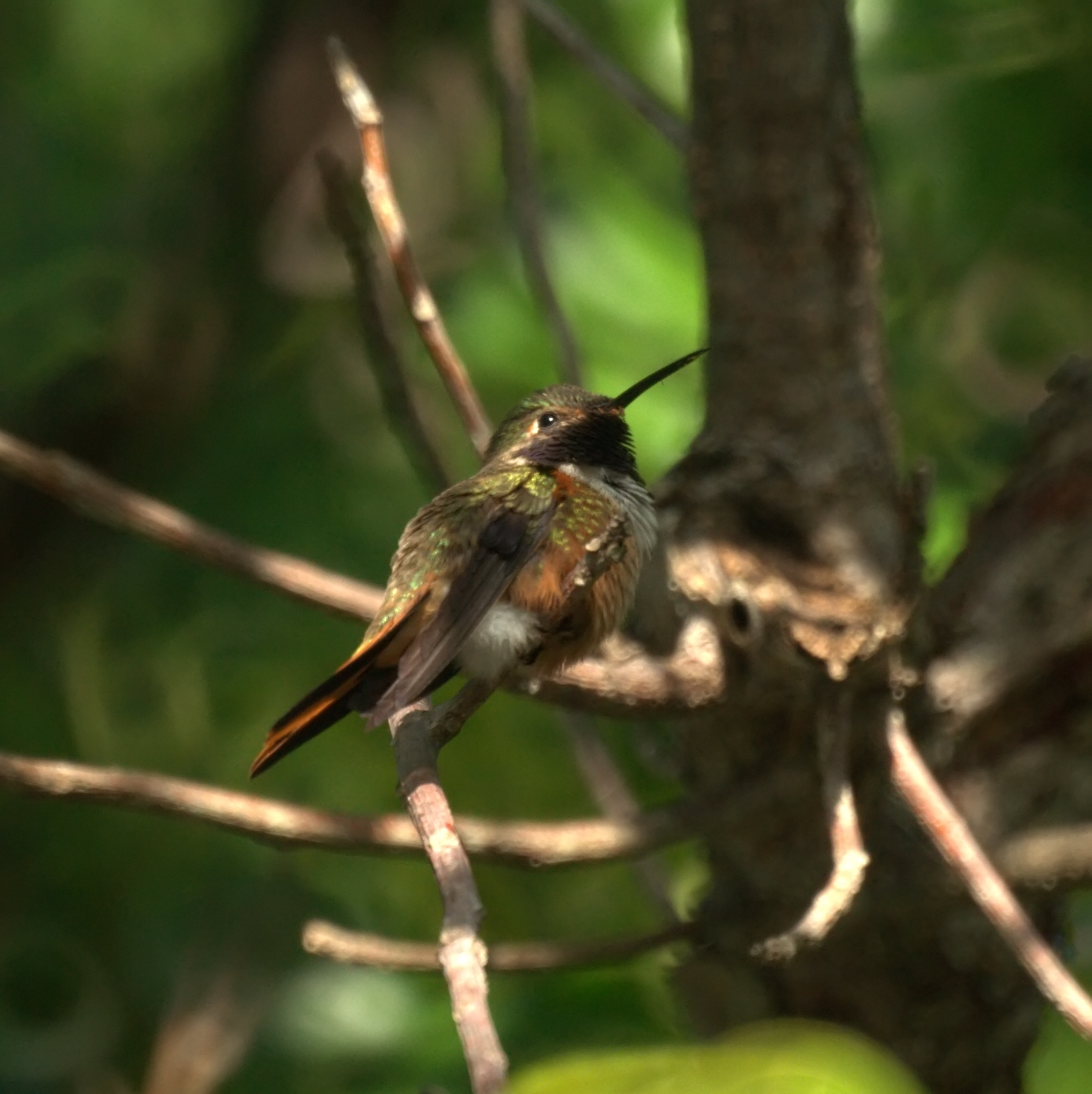

Conservation status
- Least Concern (IUCN 3.1)
- CITES Appendix II

Scientific classification
- Kingdom: Animalia
- Phylum: Chordata
- Class: Aves
- Clade: Strisores
- Order: Apodiformes
- Family: Trochilidae
- Genus: Nesophlox
- Species: N. evelynae

Binomial name
- Nesophlox evelynae (Bourcier, 1847)

Synonyms
- Philodice evelynae; Calliphlox evelynae

= Bahama woodstar =

Species of bird

The Bahama woodstar or Bahama hummingbird (Nesophlox evelynae) is a species of hummingbird endemic to the Lucayan archipelago, including the Bahamian and Turks and Caicos islands. It is named the "hummer" by locals due to a distinct humming sound it makes while feeding.

== Taxonomy ==
Hummingbirds are the second most abundant group of avian families, having approximately 338 different recognized species. Due to its recent divergence between lineages, the many clades within this group are constantly under close scrutiny and rearrangement. The Bahama woodstar in particular belongs to the "bee clade", the youngest and most extensively diversifying clade. A characteristic of this clade is the fact that males use their tails to make sounds. Relationships between species and genera of this clade are still being re-evaluated.

The Bahama woodstar is one of the species which has been recently re-evaluated, having used to contain two subspecies of woodstars: Nesophlox evelynae evelynae and Nesophlox "evelynae" lyura (also known as the Inagua woodstar). However, hummingbird species can be separated depending on morphological differences in tail shape and presence or absence of iridescent feathers, both known to play a role in sexual selection. For this reason, the Inagua woodstar, formerly considered a subspecies, is now a species in itself (Nesophlox lyrura). It has a fully iridescent crown and a more lyre-shaped tail than the Bahama woodstar.

This species was formerly placed in the genus Calliphlox. A molecular phylogenetic study published in 2014 found that the genus Calliphlox was polyphyletic. In the revised classification to create monophyletic genera, the Bahama woodstar was moved to the resurrected genus Nesophlox.

== Description ==
The Bahama woodstar is a small hummingbird, growing to be only about 8 to 9.5 cm (3.1 to 3.7 in) in length. These birds weigh around 2.4 to 3 g (0.085 to 0.106 oz). Their backs are green and gold, with olive-buff underparts, and flanks fading into white (males) or cinnamon (females). Wings are brown and their tails appear a blackish-purple. Males have a fork-shaped tail while females display a more rounded tail with wider feathers. Males have bright purple iridescent gorgets (when accurately exposed to sunlight) lined with a white stripe, which dull out as breeding season ends. Females do not have the purple throat or white stripe. Both males and females have black, slightly curved bills and black feet.

=== Vocalizations ===
The Bahama woodstar has three typical vocalizations: "chips", scolding and song. During flight and feeding, Bahama woodstars will make a one syllable "chip" sound. The length of this call may vary, from a simple "chip" to a longer, repeated sequence of "chips". Other simple calls such as "spurts" from courting or fighting males, and "cheep" sounds from younglings have rarely been recorded. Scolding was recorded during agonistic behaviour such as fighting and chasing. Scolding is a two syllable call, where the second syllable may be vocalized once or repeated multiple times after the first syllable. The frequency of both "chips" and scolding range from 7 to 9 Hz, compared to 1.5 to 3 Hz in N. lyrura. Songs are vocalized when resting on a branch or by males courting females. This song is high-pitched and lasts around 30 seconds, compared to the shorter song of N. lyrura.

The call of the Bahama woodstar somewhat resembles that of the North American Anna's hummingbird.

== Distribution and habitat ==
The Bahama woodstar is distributed around the Lucayan Archipelago, including the Turks and Caicos Islands, and with exception to the Inaguan islands. It has also been recorded multiple times in Florida, United States. In April 2013, a bird was seen for three days at a feeder in Lancaster County, Pennsylvania. They are less plentiful on the Grand Bahama, Abaco and Andros Islands that house the Cuban emerald, an introduced hummingbird which shows competitive aggression towards the Bahama woodstar.

Bahama woodstars are found in many different habitats such as gardens, scrubland, both secondary growth and dry lowland, the edges of tropical evergreen forests and pine forests. They tend not to migrate very far from these habitats being a year-round species. Although they may inhabit the same area as other woodstars, they are not very social and will often become aggressive towards other birds.

== Behaviour ==
=== Food and feeding ===
Bahama woodstars mainly suck up nectar from local plants . On the Abaco Islands, one of these plants include Ernodea serratifolia. They visit the flowers during the mornings and evenings. Lacerations can be seen in the tubular corollas of the flowers, where the beaks of these birds and other hummingbird species took the nectar. They may also feed on insects.

=== Breeding ===
Breeding season is mainly in April, but Bahama woodstars may also breed year-round. During the breeding season, males court females using two courting displays: shuttle displays, broken into shuttle segments which are periods of side to side flight and aerial dives.

Shuttle displays include three forms: initial, typical and alternate.

- The initial shuttle is characterized by a brief shuttle segment followed by a period of hovering over the on-looking female.
- Typical shuttle displays are characterized by rapid segments of repeated lateral flight around the female while constantly looking at her. Males will frequently change direction and angle of their flight. In addition, during the middle of the segment they will snap their tail to the side a few times. At the end of each segment, they beat their wings at a high intensity making a buzzing sound known as a wing trill . The male will slowly decrease his distance from the female until he is only centimeters away from her.
- Alternate shuttle displays include shuttle segments and song while hovering over the female. Males sometimes only use one type of display, or they may use typical combined with alternate.

Aerial dives have seldom been recorded, but are always demonstrated after shuttle displays. Males will zigzag up to heights of 20 m (66 ft) and then abruptly dive back down towards their perch, near the female.

The nest is a small cup made of soft materials such as cotton and down, woven together with lichen and various plant materials such as twigs and bark The height of these nests varies, some recorded as low as 2 feet and as high as 12 feet. Females lay two white oval shaped eggs which incubate for approximately two weeks.
