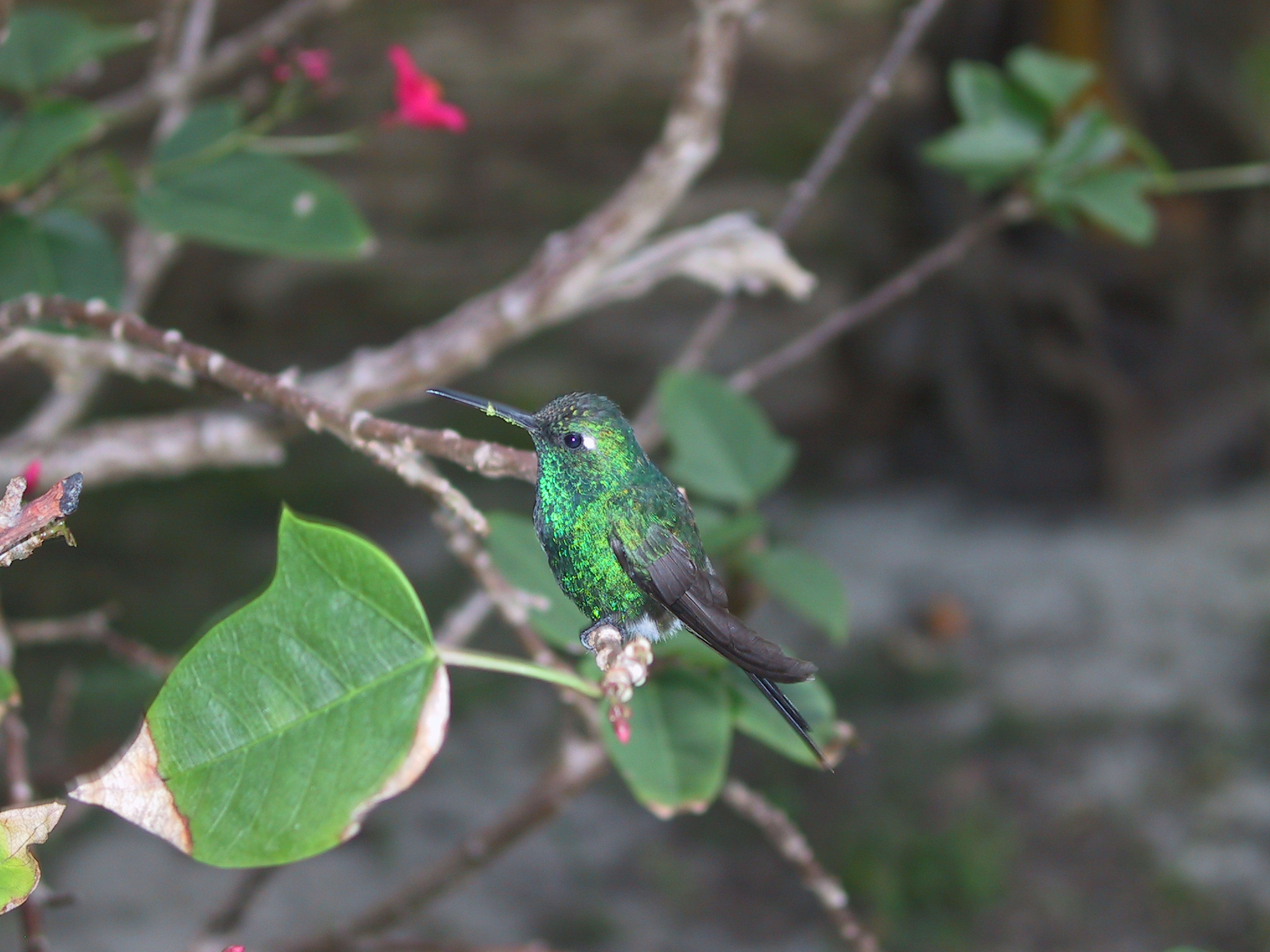
- Cuban emerald, (Riccordia ricordii)

Scientific classification
- Kingdom: Animalia
- Phylum: Chordata
- Class: Aves
- Order: Apodiformes
- Family: Trochilidae
- Tribe: Trochilini
- Genus: Riccordia; Reichenbach, 1854

Type species
- Ornismya ricordii Gervais, 1835

Species
- 5, see text

= Riccordia =

Genus of birds

Riccordia is a genus of birds in the hummingbird family Trochilidae. They are endemic to the Caribbean.

== Species ==
The species now placed in this genus were formerly assigned to the genus Chlorostilbon. A molecular phylogenetic study published in 2014 found that Chlorostilbon was polyphyletic. In the revised classification to create monophyletic genera, these species, as well as the blue-headed hummingbird in the monotypic Cyanophaia, were moved to the resurrected genus Riccordia that had been introduced in 1854 by the German ornithologist Ludwig Reichenbach with the Cuban emerald as the type species. The two extinct species, Brace's emerald and Gould's emerald, were not included in the phylogenetic studies and thus their placement is uncertain. Reichenbach based the genus name on the specific epithet of the type species, recordii, which had been chosen by Paul Gervais to honour the French surgeon-naturalist Alexandre Ricord (born 1798).

The genus contains five species, of which one is extinct:

Genus Riccordia – Reichenbach, 1854 – five species
Common name	Scientific name and subspecies	Range	Size and ecology	IUCN status and estimated population
Blue-headed hummingbird	Riccordia bicolor (Gmelin, JF, 1788)	Dominica and Martinique in the Lesser Antilles	Size: Habitat: Diet:	LC
Puerto Rican emerald	Riccordia maugaeus (Audebert & Vieillot, 1801)	Puerto Rico	Size: Habitat: Diet:	LC
Cuban emerald Male Female	Riccordia ricordii (Gervais, 1835)	Bahamas and Cuba	Size: Habitat: Diet:	LC
Hispaniolan emerald	Riccordia swainsonii (Lesson, 1829)	Hispaniola	Size: Habitat: Diet:	LC
† Brace's emerald	Riccordia bracei (Lawrence, 1877)	Bahamas, New Providence	Size: Habitat: Diet:	EX
