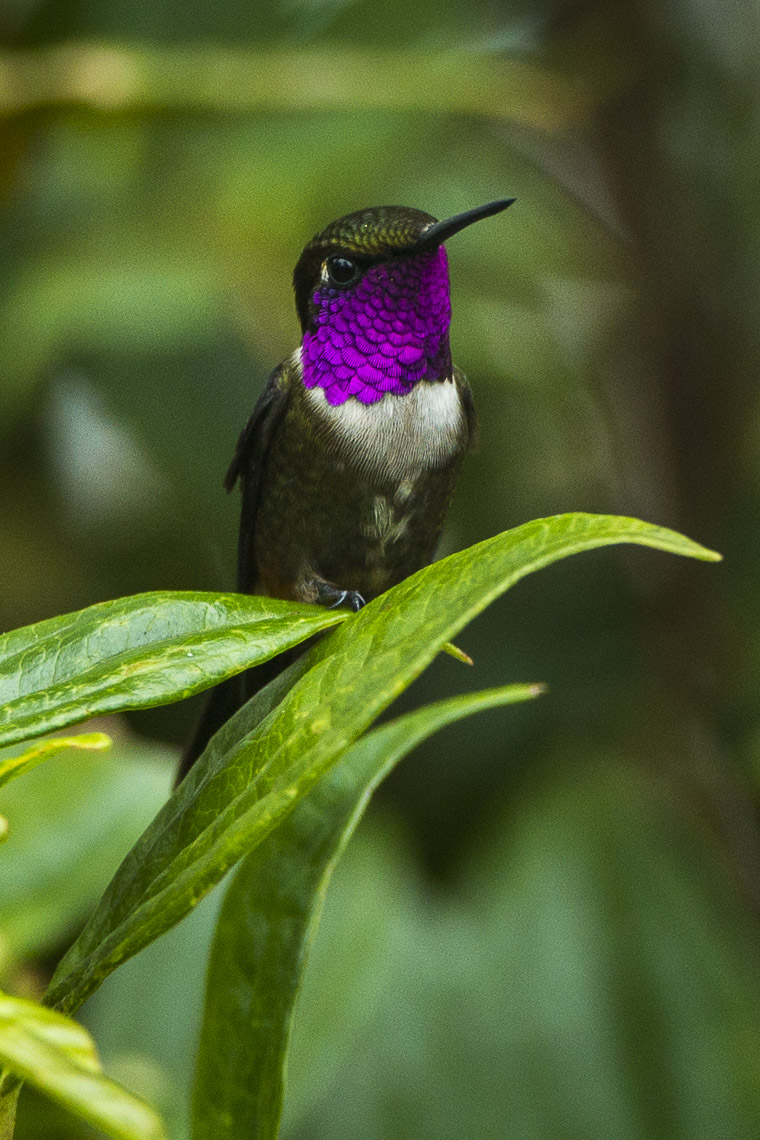
- Male

Conservation status
- Least Concern (IUCN 3.1)
- CITES Appendix II

Scientific classification
- Kingdom: Animalia
- Phylum: Chordata
- Class: Aves
- Clade: Strisores
- Order: Apodiformes
- Family: Trochilidae
- Genus: Philodice
- Species: P. mitchellii

Binomial name
- Philodice mitchellii (Bourcier, 1847)

Synonyms
- Calliphlox mitchellii

= Purple-throated woodstar =

Species of hummingbird

The purple-throated woodstar (Philodice mitchellii) is a species of hummingbird in tribe Mellisugini of subfamily Trochilinae, the "bee hummingbirds". It is found in Colombia, Ecuador, and Panama.

== Taxonomy and systematics ==
The purple-throated woodstar is placed in genus Philodice by the International Ornithological Committee (IOC), the Clements taxonomy, and the South American Classification Committee of the American Ornithological Society (AOS). According to them, it shares the genus with the magenta-throated woodstar (P. bryantae). However, the North American Classification Committee of AOS and BirdLife International's Handbook of the Birds of the World retain them in the older genus Calliphlox.

All the taxonomies agree that the purple-throated woodstar is monotypic.

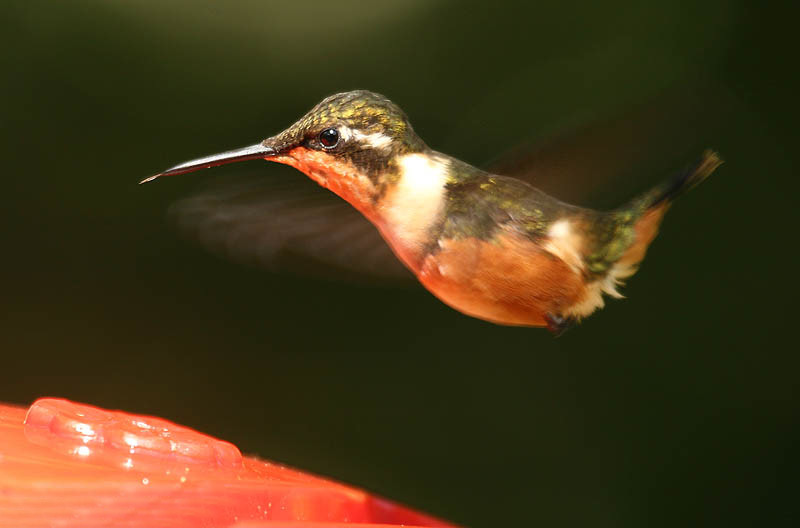
female/immature

== Description ==
The purple-throated woodstar is 6.8 to 7.5 cm (2.7 to 3.0 in) long and weighs 3.0 to 3.3 g (0.11 to 0.12 oz). Both sexes have a short, straight, black bill. Both have dusky bronze-green upperparts with a white patch on either side of the rump. The male has a small white spot behind the eye and the female a downward curved white line there. The male's gorget is shining violet-purple with a white band below it. Its lower breast is dusky bronze and the belly and flanks rufous. The forked tail is brownish purple. The female has a buffy white throat with dusky speckles at the side, a white band below it, a green lower breast, and a rufous belly. Its central tail feathers are bronze-green and the others cinnamon with a black band near the end.

== Distribution and habitat ==
The purple-throated woodstar is found discontinuously in eastern Panama's Darién Province, along both slopes of Colombia's western Andes and south to central Ecuador, and in southern Ecuador. It inhabits the edges and interior of humid forest and cloudforest. In elevation in ranges from sea level to 2,400 m (7,900 ft) but is most numerous above 1,000 m (3,300 ft).

== Behavior ==
=== Movement ===
At least in Colombia, the purple-throated woodstar breeds at higher elevations and moves to lower ones outside that season.

=== Feeding ===
The purple-throated woodstar forages for nectar high in flowering trees such as those of genera Cordia and Inga. Males defend feeding territories. In addition to feeding on nectar the species captures small arthropods by hawking from a perch.

=== Breeding ===
The purple-throated woodstar breeds between December and May in southwestern Colombia; its breeding season elsewhere has not been determined. It builds a tiny cup nest of fine fibers and spiderweb on a thick branch of a tall tree, typically 8 to 12 m (26 to 39 ft) above the ground. The female incubates the clutch of two eggs for 15 to 17 days; the time to fledging is not known.

=== Vocalization ===
The purple-throated woodstar's song has not been described. Its calls include "a series of thin 'chit' notes" and "a squeaky 'kyee-kyee-kyee-kyee'."

== Status ==
The IUCN has assessed the purple-throated woodstar as being of Least Concern. It has a restricted range, and though its population size is not known it is believed to be stable. It is considered uncommon to locally common and appears to depend on native trees for nectar. It occurs in at least two protected areas in Colombia.
