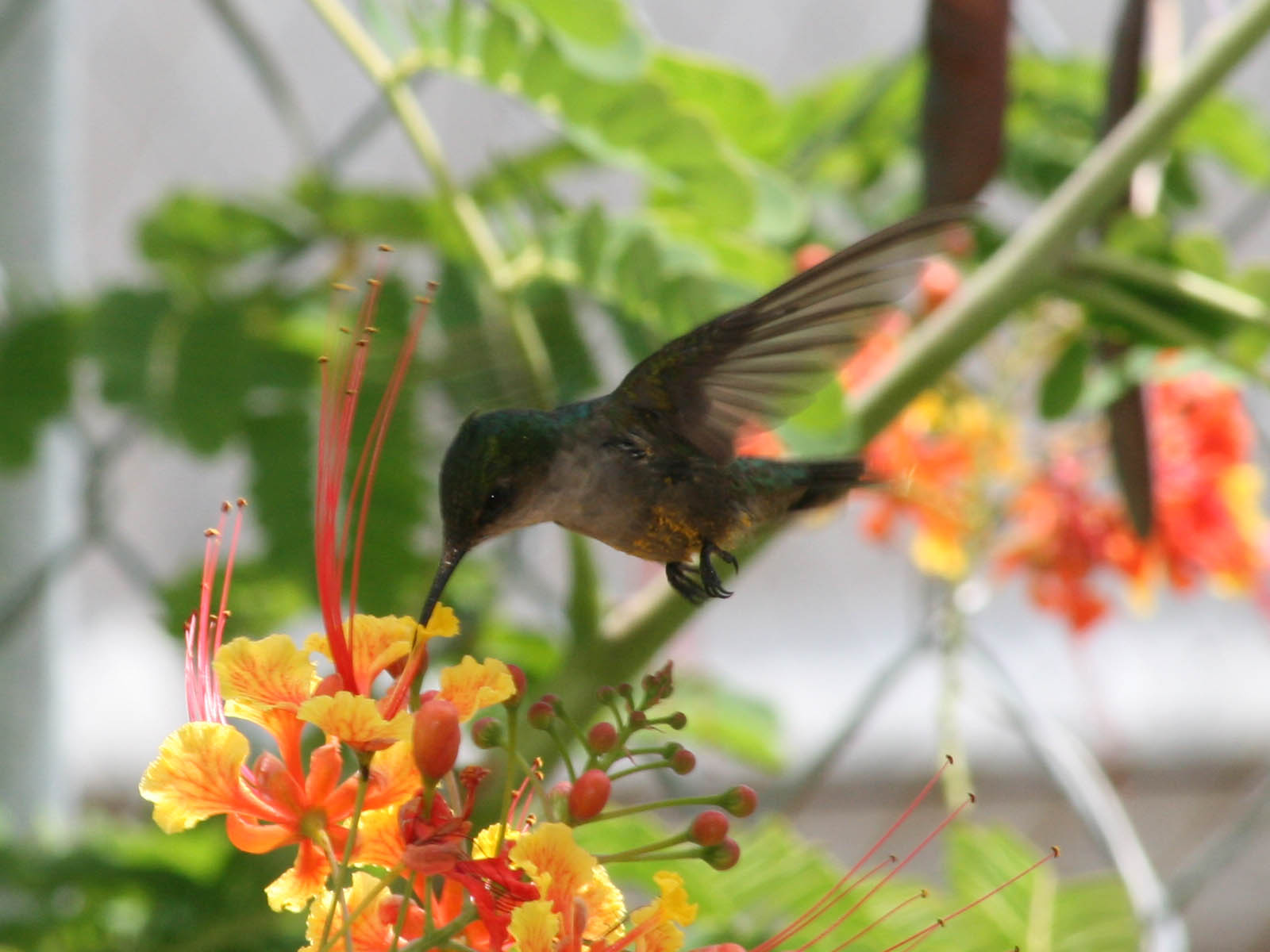

Conservation status
- Least Concern (IUCN 3.1)
- CITES Appendix II

Scientific classification
- Kingdom: Animalia
- Phylum: Chordata
- Class: Aves
- Clade: Strisores
- Order: Apodiformes
- Family: Trochilidae
- Genus: Riccordia
- Species: R. maugaeus

Binomial name
- Riccordia maugaeus (Audebert & Vieillot, 1801)

Synonyms
- "Chlorostilbon maugaeus"

= Puerto Rican emerald =

Species of hummingbird

The Puerto Rican emerald (Riccordia maugaeus), or zumbadorcito de Puerto Rico in Spanish, is species of hummingbird in the "emeralds", tribe Trochilini of subfamily Trochilinae. It is endemic to Puerto Rico.

== Taxonomy and systematics ==
The Puerto Rican emerald was formerly placed in the genus Chlorostilbon. Based on a molecular phylogenetic study published in 2014 and a 2017 publication, the North American Classification Committee of the American Ornithological Society, the International Ornithological Committee (IOC), and the Clements taxonomy moved it to the resurrected genus Riccordia. However, as of 2020 BirdLife International's Handbook of the Birds of the World (HBW) retained it in Chlorostilbon.

== Description ==
Male Puerto Rican emeralds are 8.5 to 9.5 cm (3.3 to 3.7 in) long and females 7.5 to 8.5 cm (3.0 to 3.3 in). The species weighs between 3.4 and 3.8 g (0.12 and 0.13 oz). Both sexes have a small white spot behind the eye. Males have a short straight bill with black-tipped red mandible and a black maxilla. Its forehead and crown are iridescent green; the rest of its upperparts are dark shining metallic green. Its gorget is iridescent bluish green and the rest of its underparts are shining green. The tail is forked and shining steely blue. The female's bill is all black. Its forehead and crown are dull dark green and the rest of the upperparts shining grass green. Its throat is light gray that darkens on the belly and undertail coverts. The tail is less forked than the male's. Its outermost pair of feathers have pale white bases, brown centers, and white ends. The next pair inward is steel blue with greenish white bases and a white spot at the end. The next two pairs are green on their body half and dull brown beyond. The central pair is shining green.

== Distribution and habitat ==
The Puerto Rican emerald is found throughout its namesake island. It inhabits almost all the forested landscapes from coastal mangroves to montane forest on the summits including dry and moist forests, plantations, and secondary forest. It also occurs in gardens and urban areas.

== Behavior ==
=== Movement ===
The Puerto Rican emerald is sedentary.

=== Feeding ===
The Puerto Rican emerald forages for nectar from wide variety flowering plants and trees. It mostly feeds at low to medium levels of the forest. In addition to nectar, it feeds on small arthropods by gleaning from leaves and branches; its diet includes flies, Homoptera, Hymenoptera, and spiders.

=== Breeding ===
The Puerto Rican emerald's peak breeding season spans from February to May but some nesting occurs at any time of year. The nest is a small cup of dry plant fibers lined with softer material and covered with lichen. It is typically built in a low to medium-height shrub or tree. The female incubates the clutch of two eggs for 14 to 16 days; fledging occurs 20 to 22 days after hatch.

=== Vocalization ===
What is believed to be the Puerto Rican emerald's song is "a repeated twittering phrase of high-pitched descending notes followed by a series of ‘lisping’ notes on constant pitch 'tseereetseetseetsee-tslew-tslew-tslew-tslew-tslew'". It also makes "high-pitched 'tsik'" and "si..si..sik-sik...tsik.." calls.

== Status ==
The IUCN has assessed the Puerto Rican emerald as being of Least Concern, though its population size and trend are not known. It is considered generally common throughout its large island and accepts human-made landscapes like plantations, gardens, and parks.

== See also ==
- Fauna of Puerto Rico
- List of birds of Puerto Rico
- List of endemic fauna of Puerto Rico
- List of birds of Vieques
- El Toro Wilderness
