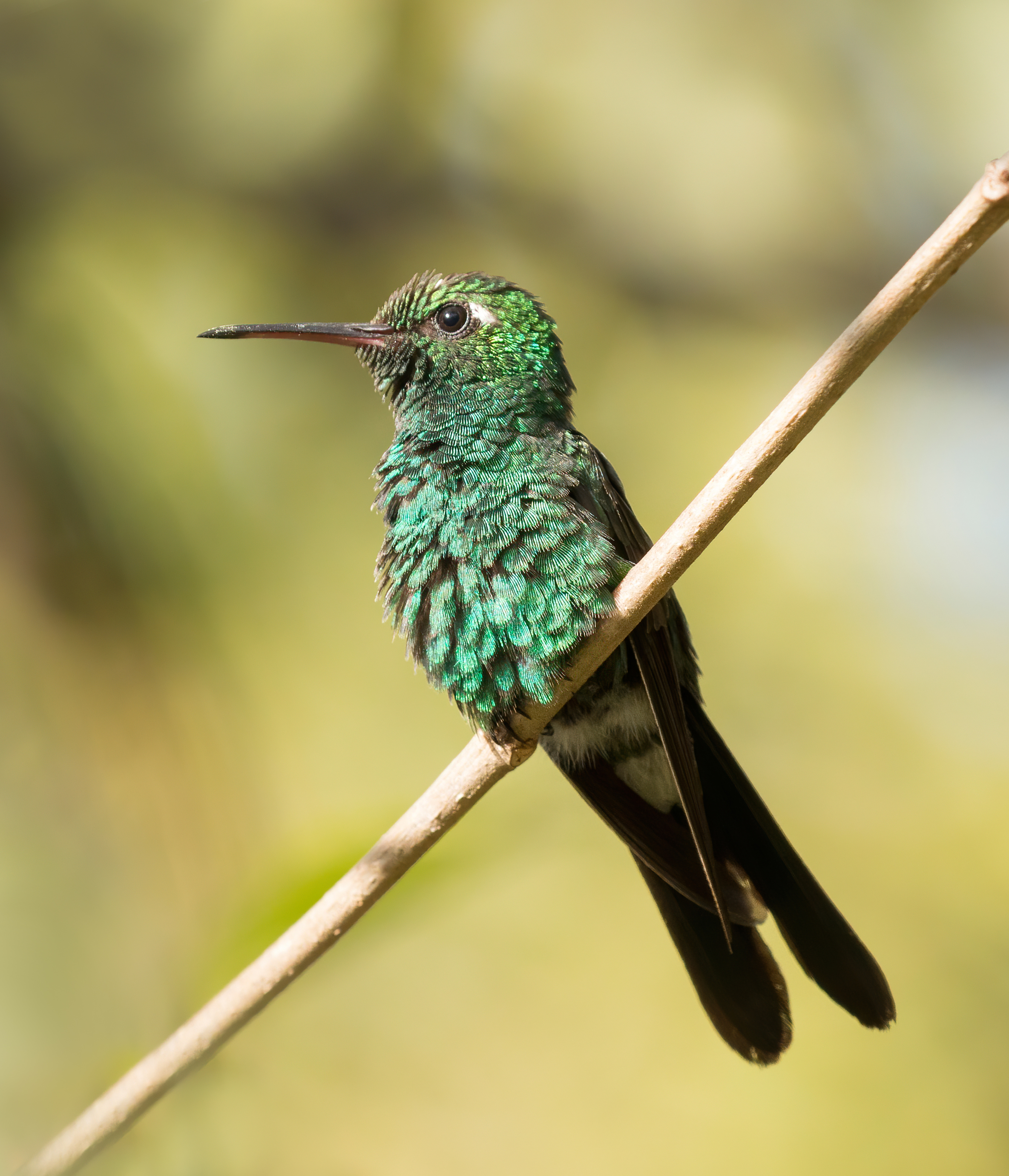
- Male

Conservation status
- Least Concern (IUCN 3.1)
- CITES Appendix II

Scientific classification
- Kingdom: Animalia
- Phylum: Chordata
- Class: Aves
- Clade: Strisores
- Order: Apodiformes
- Family: Trochilidae
- Genus: Riccordia
- Species: R. ricordii

Binomial name
- Riccordia ricordii (Gervais, 1835)
- Range of C. ricordii

Synonyms
- Chlorostilbon ricordii

= Cuban emerald =

Species of hummingbird

The Cuban emerald (Riccordia ricordii) is a species of hummingbird in the "emeralds", tribe Trochilini of subfamily Trochilinae. It is found in the Bahamas and Cuba.

== Taxonomy and systematics ==
The Cuban emerald was formerly placed in the genus Chlorostilbon. Based on a molecular phylogenetic study published in 2014 and a 2017 publication, the North American Classification Committee of the American Ornithological Society, the International Ornithological Committee (IOC), and the Clements taxonomy moved it to the resurrected genus Riccordia. However, as of 2020 BirdLife International's Handbook of the Birds of the World (HBW) retained it in Chlorostilbon.

The Cuban emerald is monotypic. However, the extinct Brace's emerald (R. bracei) was at one time treated as a subspecies of it.

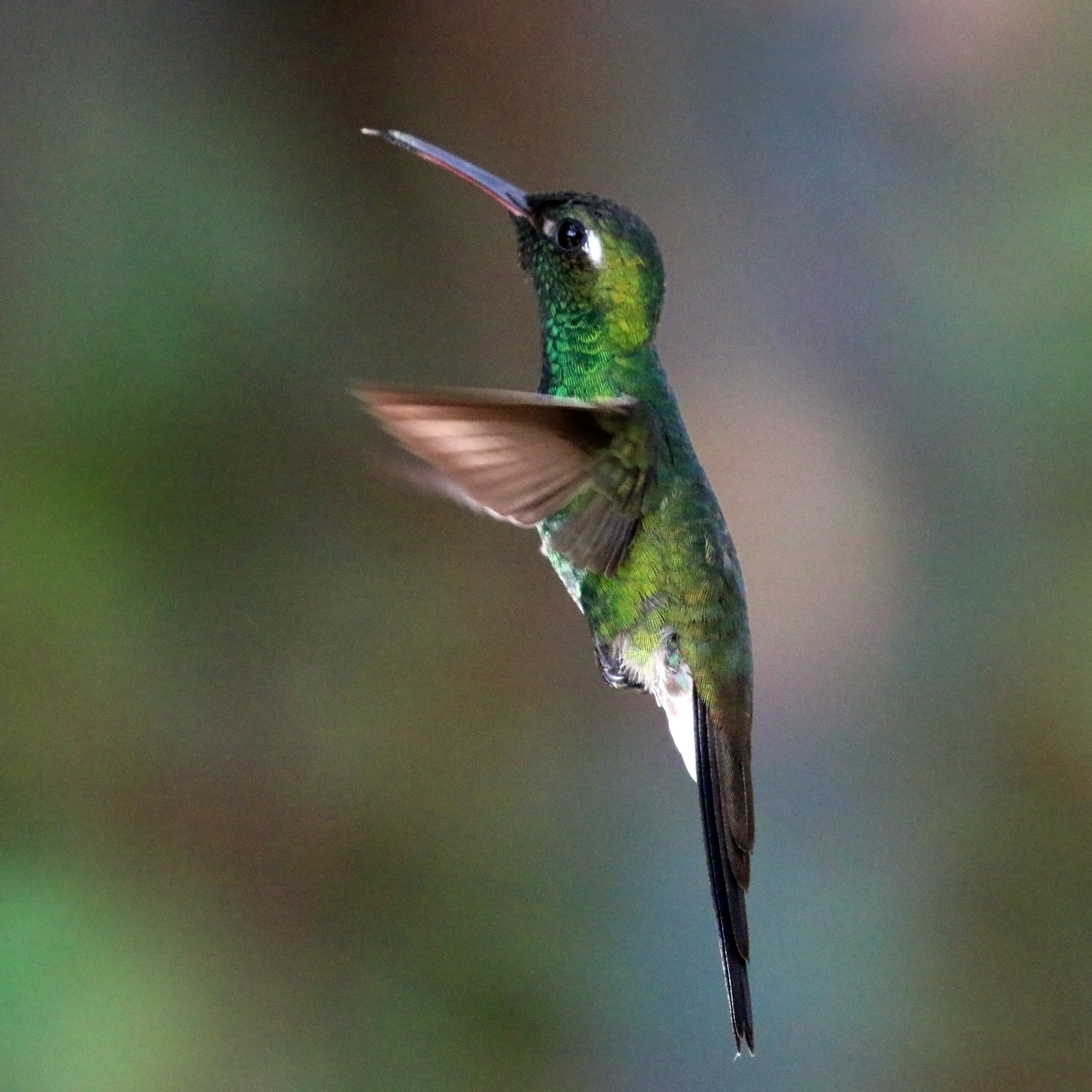
Male in flight

== Description ==
Male Cuban emeralds are 10.5 to 11.5 cm (4.1 to 4.5 in) long and females 9.5 to 10.5 cm (3.7 to 4.1 in). The species weighs between 2.5 and 5 g (0.088 and 0.18 oz). Males have a short, slightly decurved, black-tipped bill whose mandible is dull black and the maxilla red. It has a small whitish spot behind the eye. Its upperparts are dark shining green with a bronze tinge; the crown is darker and duller. Its underparts are mostly iridescent metallic green with white undertail coverts. The tail is deeply forked. Its innermost four pairs of feathers are dark metallic bronze to greenish bronze and the outermost pair similar with dark brown inner webs. Female's upperparts are similar to the male's. It has a longer whitish spot behind the eye. The underparts are mostly brownish gray with metallic green flanks and white undertail coverts. The tail is less forked than the male's but colored similarly.

== Distribution and habitat ==
The Cuban emerald is found on the main island of Cuba, the large Isla de la Juventud (Isle of Pines), and several smaller offshore cays. It is also found on Grand Bahama, Great Abaco, Andros, and Green Cay and occasionally as a stray on other islands in the Bahamas. It inhabits a variety of wooded habitats. On mainland Cuba it mostly occurs in both arid and humid open forest and on Grand Bahama in pine woods and coastal scrub forest. It also occurs in parks, gardens, and plantations. In elevation it ranges from sea level to at least 1,300 m (4,300 ft) but there are records at almost 2,000 m (6,600 ft) on Cuba.

== Behavior ==
=== Movement ===
The Cuban emerald is generally sedentary but makes some local elevational dispersal. It has been reported as a vagrant in Florida at least 14 times but the AOS considers the records "unsubstantiated" and it is not on the official Florida state list.

=== Feeding ===
The Cuban emerald forages for nectar at a variety of flowering trees and shrubs, generally staying below about 6 m (20 ft) of the ground. It also feeds on small insects captured by hawking from a perch and sometimes by gleaning from spider webs.

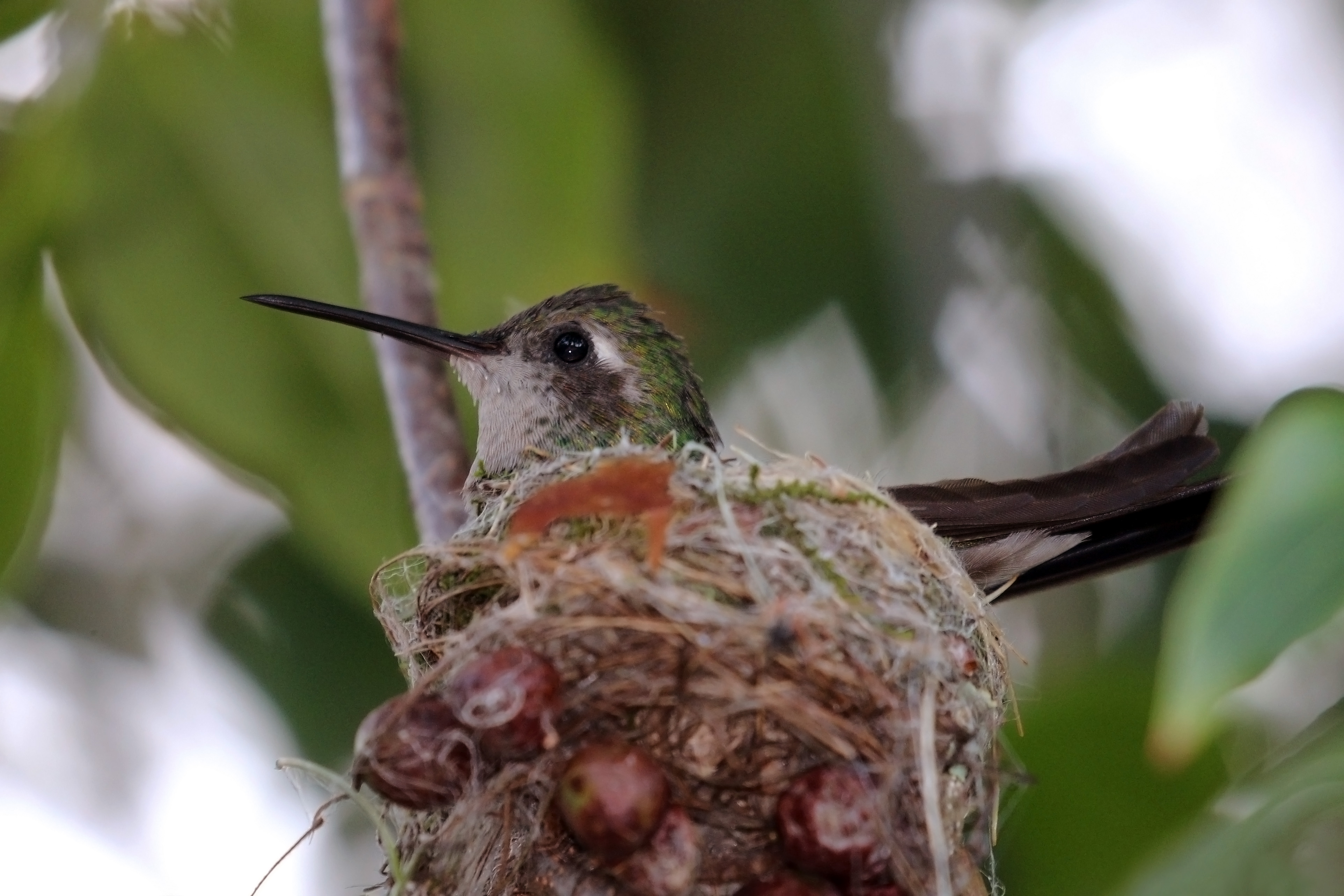
Female on nest

=== Breeding ===
The Cuban emerald can breed at any time of the year, but is thought to do so in Cuba mainly between April and July. It makes a cup nest of plant fiber, moss, and bark woven together with spider web and often covered with lichen and bits of bark. It places the nest in a fork, usually between 1 and 4 m (3 and 10 ft) above the ground. The female incubates the clutch of two eggs for 15 to 16 days and fledging occurs 19 to 22 days after hatch.

=== Vocalization ===
The male Cuban emerald's high-pitched song is "a rapid rolling series of 'slee' notes and sputtering metallic sounds". Females give a "high-pitched 'seeeee' flight call". They also make "a buzzy 'zzzir'" and "chi-di-dit" calls.

== Status ==
The IUCN has assessed the Cuban emerald as being of Least Concern, though its population size and trend are not known. It does have a large range and no immediate threats have been identified. It is considered common in most of its range and readily uses human-made habitat.
