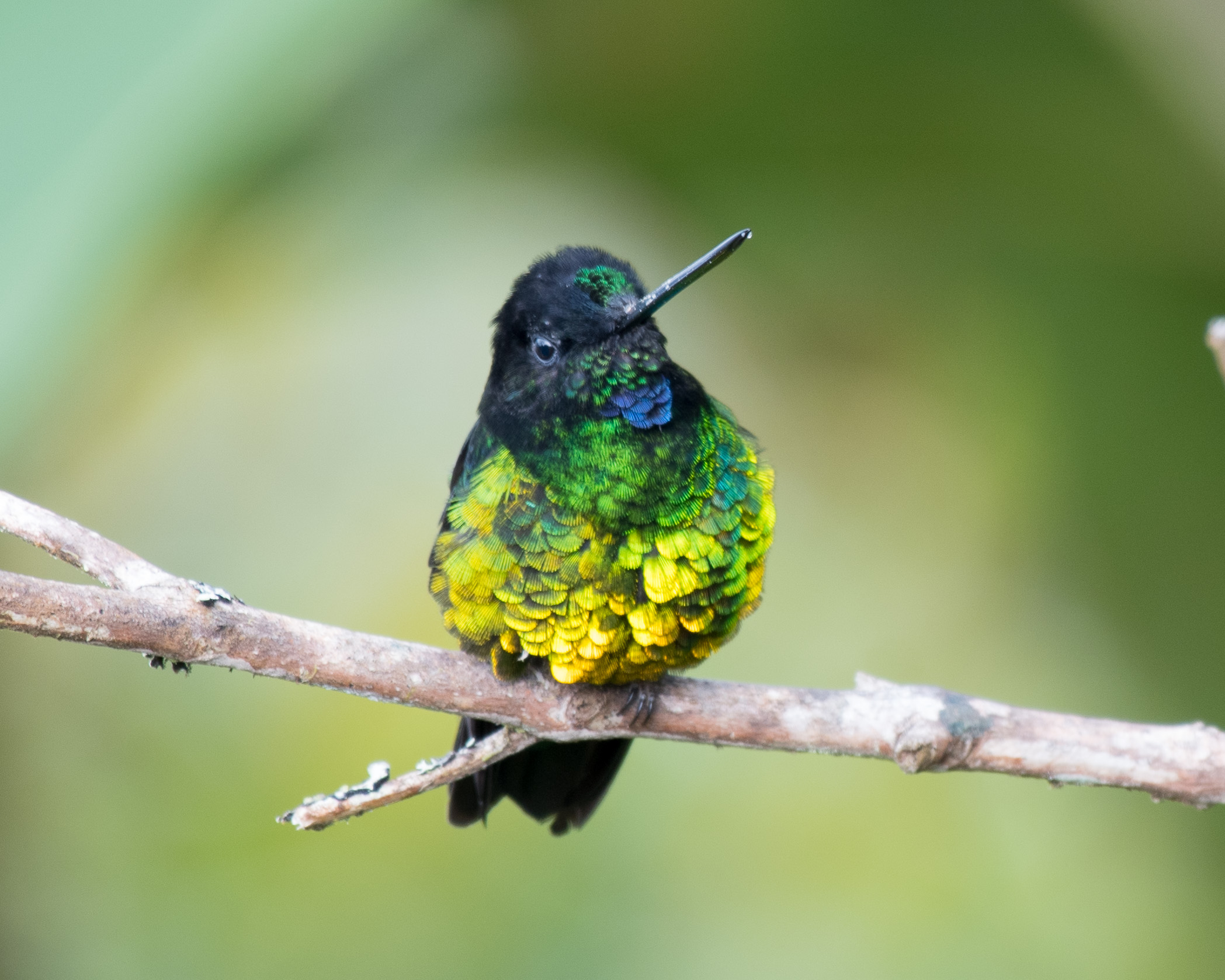

Conservation status
- Endangered (IUCN 3.1)
- CITES Appendix II (CITES)

Scientific classification
- Kingdom: Animalia
- Phylum: Chordata
- Class: Aves
- Clade: Strisores
- Order: Apodiformes
- Family: Trochilidae
- Genus: Coeligena
- Species: C. orina

Binomial name
- Coeligena orina Wetmore, 1953

= Dusky starfrontlet =

Species of hummingbird

The dusky starfrontlet (Coeligena orina), also known as glittering starfrontlet, is an Endangered species of hummingbird in the "brilliants", tribe Heliantheini in subfamily Lesbiinae. It is endemic to a few small areas in western Colombia.

== Taxonomy and systematics ==
The dusky starfrontlet was originally known from a single museum specimen collected in 1951 and described as a full species in 1953. In 1988 its status was reassessed as a subspecies of golden-bellied starfrontlet (Coeligena bonapartei). It was rediscovered in 2004, in what is now the Colibri del Sol Bird Reserve, and additional specimens confirmed its identity as a species. It and the buff-winged starfrontlet (C. lutetiae) are sister species and it is also closely related to the golden-bellied, violet-throated (C. violifer), and blue-throated (C. helianthea) starfrontlets.

The dusky starfrontlet is monotypic.

== Description ==
The dusky starfrontlet is about 14 cm (5.5 in) long. Males weigh 6.9 to 7.2 g (0.24 to 0.25 oz) and females 6.7 to 7 g (0.24 to 0.25 oz). The male has a glittering blue-green to golden green forehead and a velvety black crown, face, and mantle. The back is green with black highlights, the rump and uppertail coverts iridescent golden green, and the tail a paler green. The throat and breast are dark green, like the back suffused with black, and there is a large cobalt-blue spot on the lower throat. The belly and undertail coverts are the same golden green as the rump. The female's crown, face, and upper back are green with blackish tips to the feathers that give a scaly effect. The rump, uppertail coverts, and tail are like the male's but with less iridescence. The throat is a bright cinnamon buff with green spots on the sides, the belly iridescent golden green with dusky inclusions, and the undertail coverts dull golden green with buffy edges.

One Spanish name for the dusky starfrontlet is "Colibrí del Sol", which translates to "hummingbird of the Sun".

== Distribution and habitat ==
The dusky starfrontlet is found in only about a dozen sites in a few small areas of the Western Andes of Colombia. The original 1951 specimen and some of the 2004 ones were collected at Páramo de Frontino, Antioquia Department. Others were collected in 2004 at nearby Las Orquídeas National Natural Park in Farallones del Citará on the Antioquia/Chocó border. Further observations have come from Jardín in Antioquia and Cerro Montezuma in Risaralda Department.

Specimens and sight records of dusky starfrontlet have come from tall humid forest, elfin forest, and the ecotone between forest and páramo. Most observations have been between about 3,100 and 3,500 m (10,200 and 11,500 ft) of elevation, but there is one record from 2,500 m (8,200 ft).

== Behavior ==
=== Movement ===
No movements of the dusky starfrontlet are definitely known, but the sighting at 2500 m might indicate that some take place.

=== Feeding ===
The dusky starfrontlet has been observed feeding on nectar at plants of genera Aetanthus, Bejaria, Bomarea, Cavendishia, and Centropogon. Stomachs of specimens have yielded spiders, wasps, flies, and what appeared to be a psocopteran.

=== Breeding ===
Little is known about the dusky starfrontlet's breeding phenology. Two nests are known, both from Tatamá National Natural Park. They were held by thin roots on rock faces about 3 m (10 ft) above the ground. Each contained two eggs. Immature birds have been reported in both January and August.

=== Vocalization ===
A few dusky starfrontlet vocalizations have been described, a "high-pitched wiry note becoming trill-like towards the end 'tseeririrrr', a single 'tsee' and a lower-pitched strident 'tsip'."

== Status ==
The IUCN originally assessed the dusky starfrontlet in 2004 as being of Least Concern but in 2007 revised its status to Critically Endangered. In 2020 the status was again revised, to Endangered. Its population is estimated at between 250 and 2500 mature individuals and is believed to be declining. Even in national parks, continued deforestation for timber, agriculture, and settlement is a threat. The high probability of future mining for gold, zinc, and copper in Páramo de Frontino poses an additional threat.
