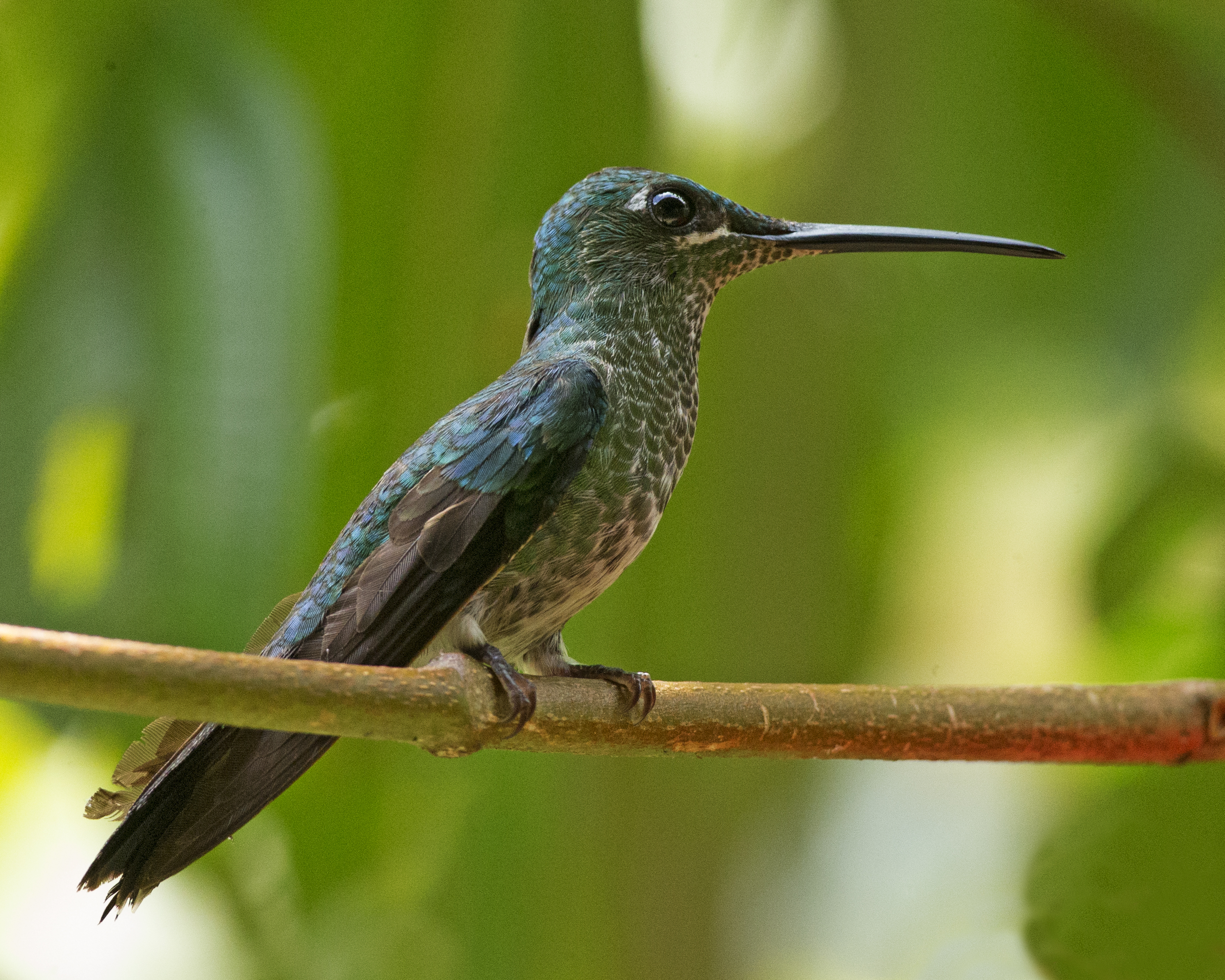
- Green-crowned brilliant (Heliodoxa jacula)

Scientific classification
- Kingdom: Animalia
- Phylum: Chordata
- Class: Aves
- Order: Apodiformes
- Family: Trochilidae
- Subfamily: Lesbiinae
- Tribe: Heliantheini; Reichenbach, 1854

Genera
- 13, see text

= Heliantheini =

Tribe of birds

Heliantheini is one of the two tribes that make up the subfamily Lesbiinae of the hummingbird family Trochilidae. The other tribe in the subfamily is Lesbiini.

The informal name "brilliants" has been proposed for this group as it includes the genus Heliodoxa that has nine species with "brilliant" in their common name.

The tribe contains 53 species divided into 14 genera.

== Phylogeny ==
A molecular phylogenetic study of the hummingbirds published in 2007 found that the family was composed of nine major clades. When Edward Dickinson and James Van Remsen, Jr. updated the Howard and Moore Complete Checklist of the Birds of the World for the 4th edition in 2013 they divided the hummingbirds into six subfamilies and proposed using the name Heliantheini for one of the two tribes in the subfamily Lesbiinae. The tribe Heliantheini had been introduced (as a subfamily Heliantheinae) by the German naturalist Ludwig Reichenbach in 1854.

== Cladogram ==
Molecular phylogenetic studies by Jimmy McGuire and collaborators published between 2007 and 2014 determined the relationships between the major groups of hummingbirds. In the cladogram below the English names are those introduced in 1997. The Latin names are those proposed by Dickinson and Remsen in 2013.

- Trochilidae
  - - Florisuginae – topazes
    - Phaethornithinae – hermits
  - - Polytminae – mangos
    - - Lesbiinae
        - Heliantheini – brilliants
        - Lesbiini – coquettes
      - - Patagoninae – giant hummingbird
        - Trochilinae
          - - Lampornithini – mountain gems
            - Mellisugini – bees
          - Trochilini – emeralds

The phylogeny of the Heliantheini based on a molecular phylogenetic study published in 2014 is shown below. Loddigesia (marvelous spatuletail) was found to be embedded within Eriocnemis.

- Heliantheini
  - - Haplophaedia
    - Eriocnemis and Loddigesia
  - - - Lafresnaya
      - Aglaeactis
    - - Coeligena
      - - - Urochroa
          - Heliodoxa
        - - - Pterophanes – great sapphirewing
            - Ensifera – sword-billed hummingbird
          - - Boissonneaua
            - - Urosticte
              - Ocreatus

== Taxonomic list ==
The tribe contains 14 genera.

| Image | Genus | Living species |
|---|---|---|
| | Haplophaedia | Greenish puffleg, Haplophaedia aureliae; Buff-thighed puffleg, Haplophaedia assimilis; Hoary puffleg, Haplophaedia lugens |
| | Eriocnemis | Black-breasted puffleg, Eriocnemis nigrivestis; Gorgeted puffleg, Eriocnemis isabellae; Glowing puffleg, Eriocnemis vestita; Black-thighed puffleg, Eriocnemis derbyi; Turquoise-throated puffleg, Eriocnemis godini; Coppery-bellied puffleg, Eriocnemis cupreoventris; Sapphire-vented puffleg, Eriocnemis luciani; Golden-breasted puffleg, Eriocnemis mosquera; Blue-capped puffleg, Eriocnemis glaucopoides; Colorful puffleg, Eriocnemis mirabilis; Emerald-bellied puffleg, Eriocnemis aline |
| | Loddigesia | Marvelous spatuletail, Loddigesia mirabilis |
| | Aglaeactis | Shining sunbeam, Aglaeactis cupripennis; White-tufted sunbeam, Aglaeactis castelnaudii; Purple-backed sunbeam, Aglaeactis aliciae; Black-hooded sunbeam, Aglaeactis pamela |
| | Coeligena | Bronzy inca, Coeligena coeligena; Brown inca, Coeligena wilsoni; Black inca, Coeligena prunellei; Green inca, Coeligena conradii; Collared inca, Coeligena torquata; Gould's inca, Coeligena inca; Violet-throated starfrontlet, Coeligena violifer; Rainbow starfrontlet, Coeligena iris; White-tailed starfrontlet, Coeligena phalerata; Dusky starfrontlet, Coeligena orina; Buff-winged starfrontlet, Coeligena lutetiae; Perija starfrontlet, Coeligena consita; Golden-bellied starfrontlet, Coeligena bonapartei; Golden-tailed starfrontlet, Coeligena eos; Blue-throated starfrontlet, Coeligena helianthea |
| | Lafresnaya | Mountain velvetbreast, Lafresnaya lafresnayi |
| | Ensifera | Sword-billed hummingbird, Ensifera ensifera |
| | Pterophanes | Great sapphirewing, Pterophanes cyanopterus |
| | Boissonneaua | Buff-tailed coronet, Boissonneaua flavescens; Chestnut-breasted coronet, Boissonneaua matthewsii; Velvet-purple coronet, Boissonneaua jardini |
| | Ocreatus | White-booted racket-tail, Ocreatus underwoodii; Peruvian racket-tail, Ocreatus peruanus; Rufous-booted racket-tail, Ocreatus addae |
| | Urochroa | Rufous-gaped hillstar, Urochroa bougueri; Green-backed hillstar, Urochroa leucura |
| | Urosticte | Purple-bibbed whitetip, Urosticte benjamini; Rufous-vented whitetip, Urosticte ruficrissa |
| | Heliodoxa | Velvet-browed brilliant, Heliodoxa xanthogonys; Pink-throated brilliant, Heliodoxa gularis; Rufous-webbed brilliant, Heliodoxa branickii; Black-throated brilliant, Heliodoxa schreibersii; Gould's jewelfront, Heliodoxa aurescens; Fawn-breasted brilliant, Heliodoxa rubinoides; Green-crowned brilliant, Heliodoxa jacula; Empress brilliant, Heliodoxa imperatrix; Violet-fronted brilliant, Heliodoxa leadbeateri; Brazilian ruby, Heliodoxa rubricauda |

== Sources ==
- Dickinson, E.C.; Remsen, J.V. Jr., eds. (2013). The Howard & Moore Complete Checklist of the Birds of the World. Vol. 1: Non-passerines (4th ed.). Eastbourne, UK: Aves Press. ISBN 978-0-9568611-0-8.
