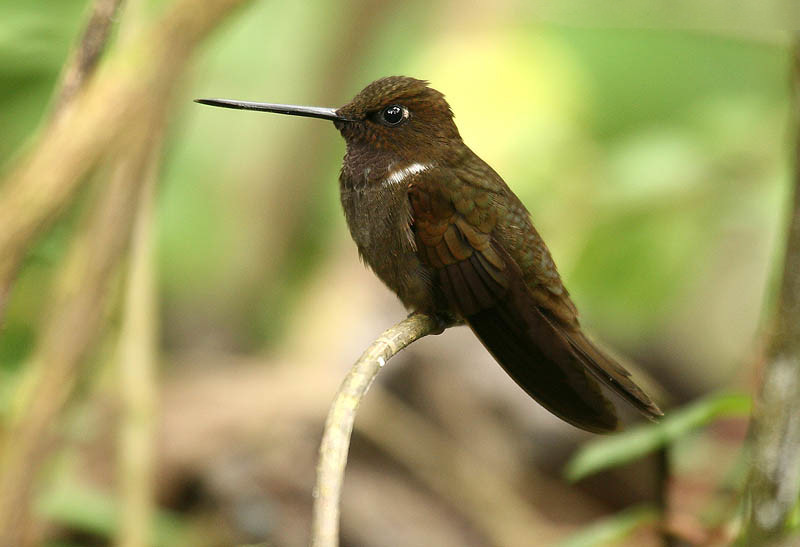

Conservation status
- Least Concern (IUCN 3.1)
- CITES Appendix II

Scientific classification
- Kingdom: Animalia
- Phylum: Chordata
- Class: Aves
- Order: Apodiformes
- Family: Trochilidae
- Genus: Coeligena
- Species: C. wilsoni

Binomial name
- Coeligena wilsoni (Delattre & Bourcier, 1846)

= Brown inca =

Brown Inca

Species of hummingbird

The brown inca (Coeligena wilsoni) is a species of hummingbird in the "brilliants", tribe Heliantheini in subfamily Lesbiinae. It is found in Colombia and Ecuador.

== Taxonomy and systematics ==
The brown inca and most other members of genus Coeligena were at one time placed in genus Helianthea but have been in their current placement since the mid-1900s. The brown inca, bronzy inca (C. coeligena), and black inca (C. prunellei) are sister species. The brown inca is monotypic.

The species' specific epithet commemorates the American naturalist Thomas Bellerby Wilson.

== Description ==
The brown inca is about 11 to 13 cm (4.3 to 5.1 in) long. Males weigh about 7.0 g (0.25 oz) and females about 6.5 g (0.23 oz). Both sexes have a long, straight, black bill and a white spot behind the eye. Adult males' upperparts are reddish bronze with a greenish olive lower back and a bronzy forked tail. Their underparts are mostly dull brown with an amethyst gorget and a white patch on each side of the breast. Adult females are essentially the same as males but for a longer bill, a smaller gorget, and a less forked tail. Immatures resemble the adult female.

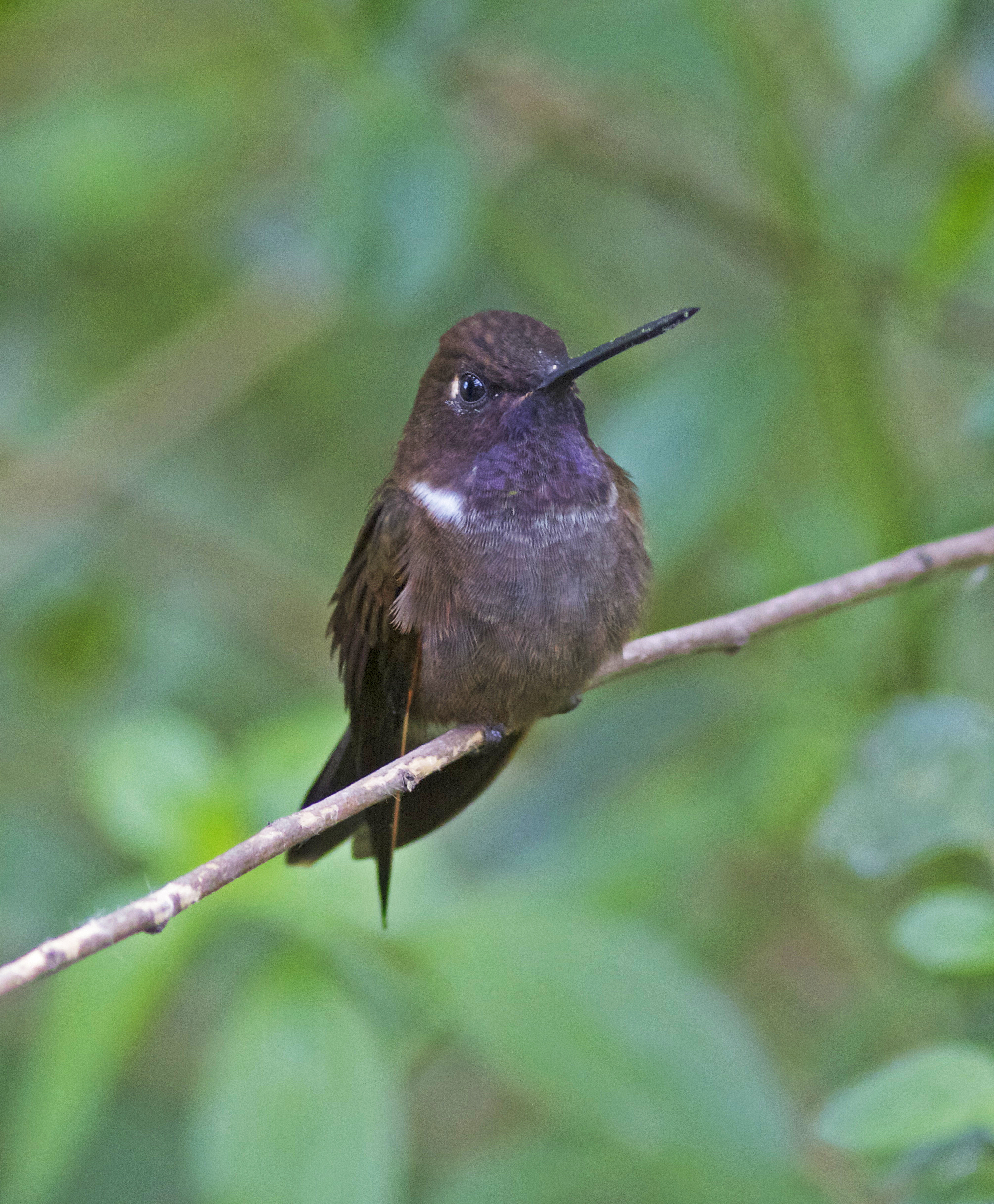
Brown inca in northwest Ecuador showing amethyst gorget

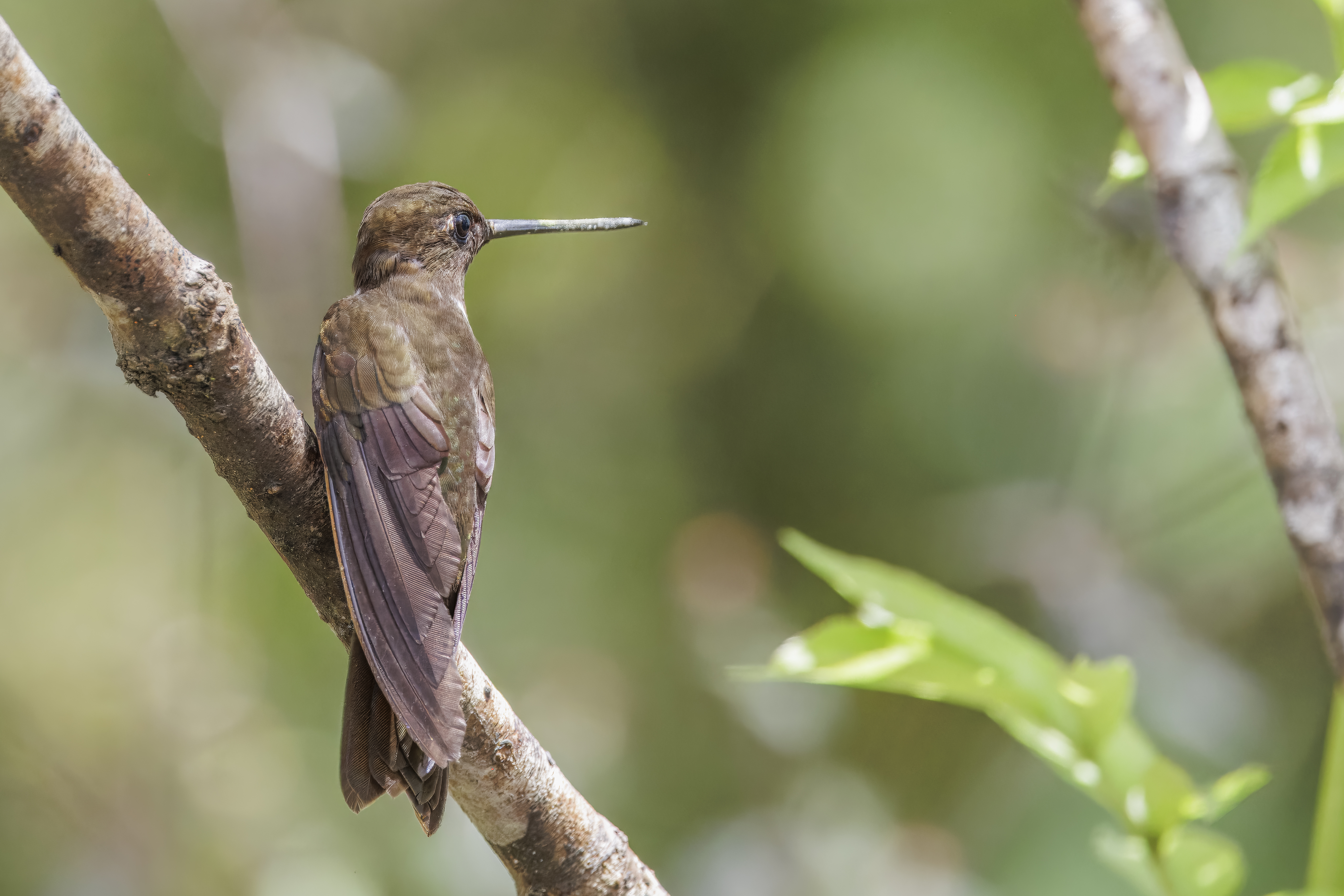

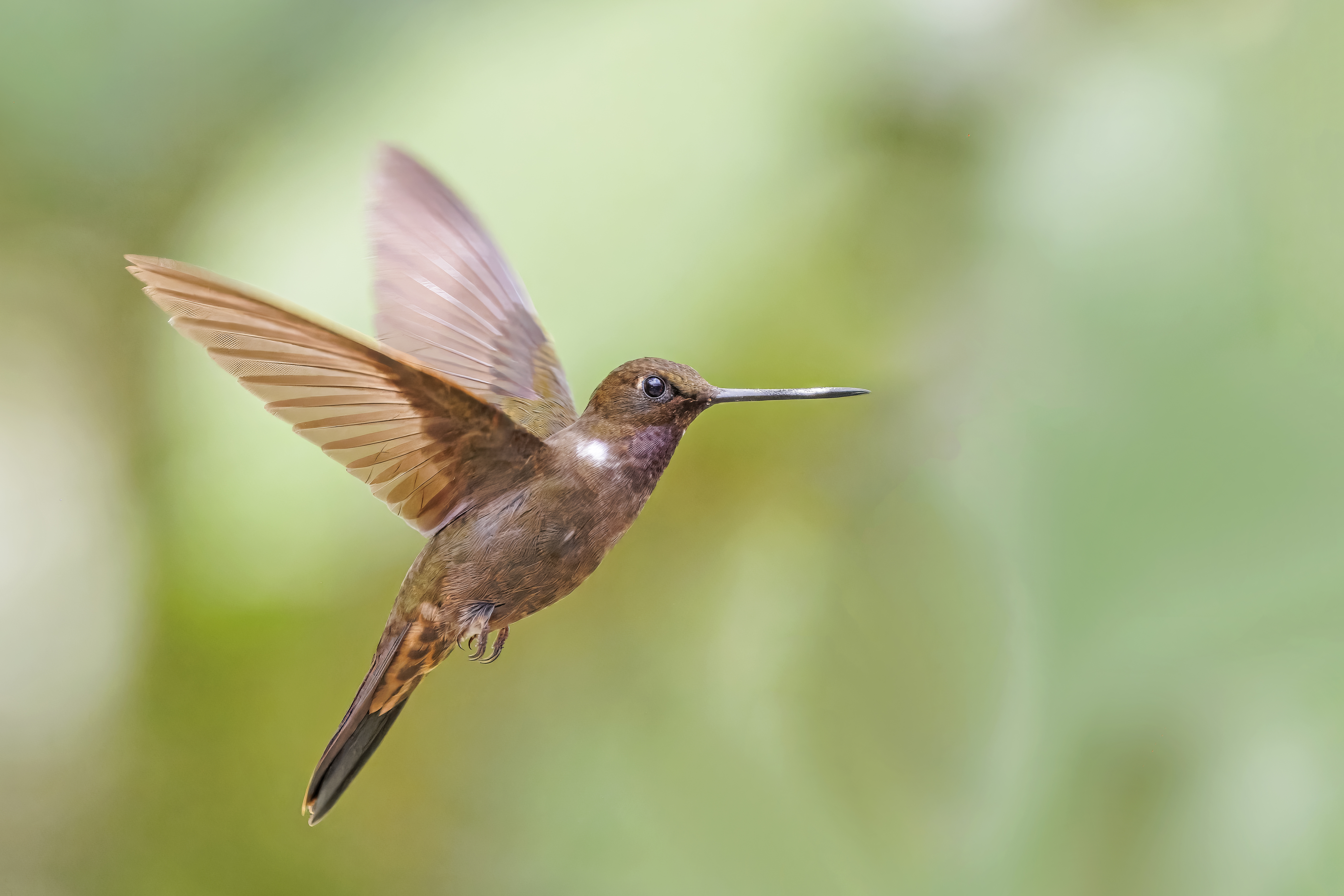

== Distribution and habitat ==
The brown inca is found on the Pacific slope of the Andes from Colombia's Chocó Department south through Ecuador all the way to Loja Province. It most commonly inhabits the edges of cloudforest and is also found in the forest interior. In elevation it generally ranges from 700 to 1,900 m (2,300 to 6,200 ft). However, it is most common below 1,300 m (4,300 ft) and has been recorded as high as 2,400 m (7,900 ft).

== Behavior ==
=== Movement ===
The brown inca probably makes some seasonal movements but little data are available.

=== Feeding ===
The brown inca forages for nectar by trap-lining, visiting a circuit of a wide variety of flowering plants low in the forest understory. Examples include genera Psammisia, Macleania, Cavendishia, and Fuchsia. In addition to feeding on nectar it gleans small arthropods from vegetation and sometimes captures them by hawking.

=== Breeding ===
The brown inca's breeding season spans from January to June. It builds a cup nest of moss and plant fibers, typically 2 to 3 m (7 to 10 ft) above ground in a fork of a small tree. The female alone incubates the clutch of two eggs for 15 to 16 days; fledging occurs 22 to 26 days after hatch.

=== Vocalization ===
What is thought to be the brown inca's song is "a repeated phrase comprising three notes, 'tsip-tzreeew-tzrew'". It has a variety of calls such as "tsit" and "tsi-tsit" notes and a "tsitsitsitsitsit…tsitsitsi...tsitsitsit..." series. In flight it utters "a short rattle 'trrr', short twitters... [and] a high-pitched 'tzree...tzee...tzee...tzee'."

== Status ==
The IUCN has assessed the brown inca as being of Least Concern, though its population size is unknown and believed to be decreasing. It is regarded as uncommon to locally common. Its habitat is under threat by deforestation and it is not known if the species accepts human-altered landscapes. It does occur in several protected areas.
