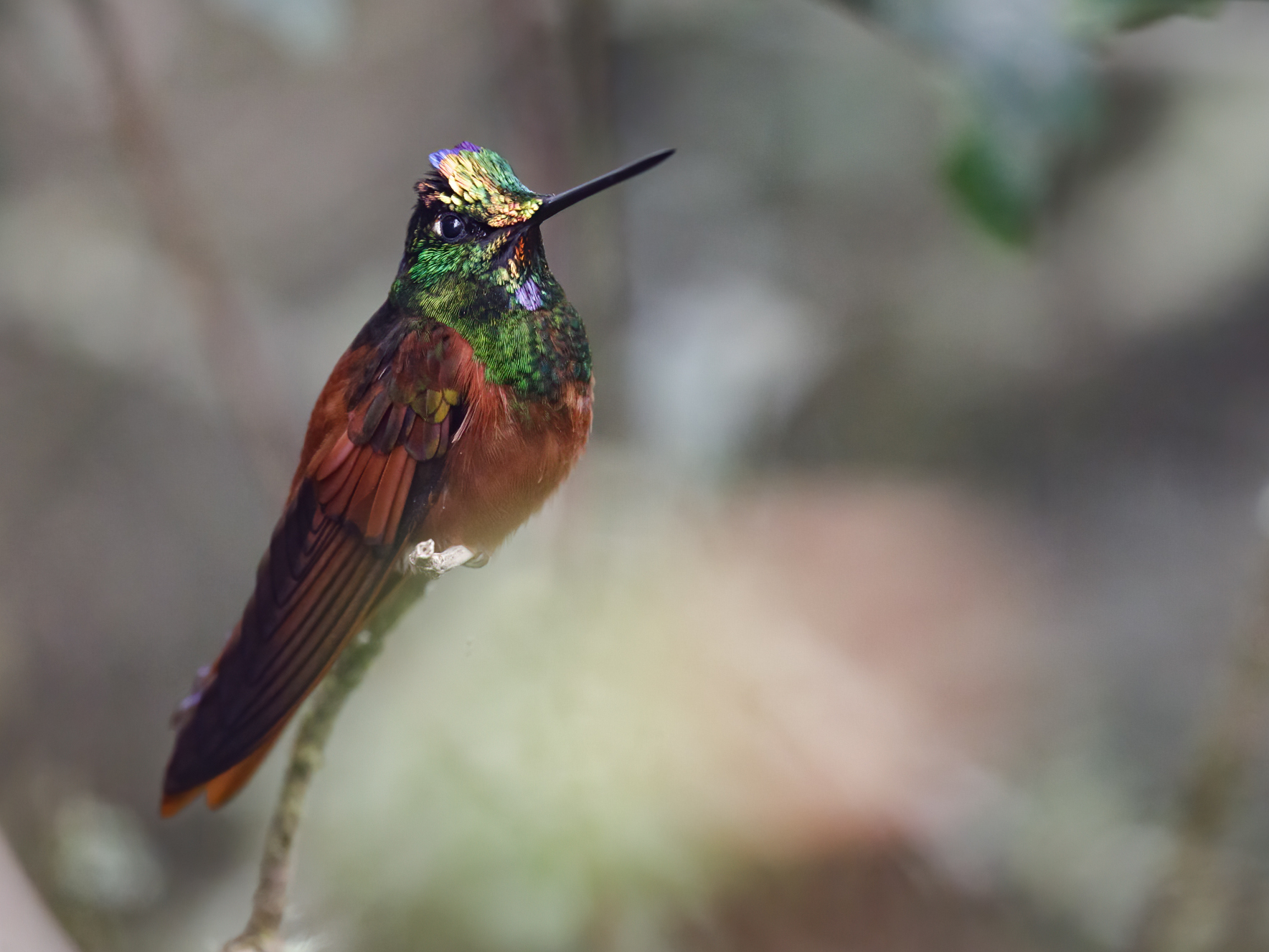

Conservation status
- Least Concern (IUCN 3.1)
- CITES Appendix II

Scientific classification
- Kingdom: Animalia
- Phylum: Chordata
- Class: Aves
- Order: Apodiformes
- Family: Trochilidae
- Genus: Coeligena
- Species: C. iris

Binomial name
- Coeligena iris (Gould, 1853)

Synonyms
- Diphogena iris; Diphogena aurora （Coeligena iris aurora）

= Rainbow starfrontlet =

Species of hummingbird

The rainbow starfrontlet (Coeligena iris) is a species of hummingbird in the "brilliants", tribe Heliantheini in subfamily Lesbiinae. It is found in Ecuador and Peru.

== Taxonomy and systematics ==
The rainbow starfrontlet has these six subspecies:

- C. i. hesperus Gould (1865)
- C. i. iris Gould (1853)
- C. i. aurora Gould (1853)
- C. i. flagrans Zimmer, JT (1951)
- C. i. eva Salvin (1897)
- C. i. fulgidiceps Simon (1921)

Early in the 20th century, subspecies C. i. hesperus, C. i. aurora, C. i. eva were considered to be separate species. "Striking differences between subspecies suggest that several are very close to species status...further gathering and analysis of evidence is needed, however, in order to produce coherent revision of species limits in this complex."

== Description ==
The rainbow starfrontlet is 12.5 to 14 cm (4.9 to 5.5 in) long. Males weigh 6.7 to 8.8 g (0.24 to 0.31 oz) and females 6 to 8.1 g (0.21 to 0.29 oz). Both sexes have a long, straight, black bill, with the female's being somewhat longer than the male's. Both sexes have a white spot behind the eye. Both sexes also have a forked tail, but the male's is more deeply indented than the female's. The subspecies differ significantly in their plumage.

Males of the nominate subspecies have a glittering yellow-green forecrown that transitions through golden yellow to blue on the crown. Their upperparts are mostly blackish with a green sheen and are chestnut on the lower back and rump. The throat and chest are glittering emerald green and the throat has a small violet spot. The belly, undertail coverts, and tail are chestnut. Nominate females are generally similar to the males but with less of a metallic sheen, and juveniles are similar to adult females.

Males of subspecies C. i. hesperus have a dark golden-red crown with a blue stripe, a golden green back, green underparts with a violet throat spot, and bronzy tips on the chestnut tail feathers. Females are a duller version of the male. Males of C. i. aurora have a turquoise crown with golden tips to the feathers, a black hindneck, and light chestnut upperparts. Their chin and throat are turquoise and the rest of the underparts light chestnut. Females are again a duller version of the male. C. i. flagrans is similar to the nominate but with a coppery hindneck and back. C. i. fulgidiceps is also similar to the nominate but with a blackish neck and upper back and darker chestnut on the underparts. Males of C. i. eva have a yellowish green forecrown, a dark violet crown, and a coppery hindneck and back. Their chin, throat, and breast are emerald green and the rest of the underparts chestnut. They do not have the violet throat patch of the other subspecies. The female has a coppery green head and lighter underparts than the male.

== Distribution and habitat ==
The six subspecies of rainbow starfrontlet are found thus:

- C. i. hesperus, southwestern Ecuador's Chimborazo and Azuay provinces
- C. i. iris, from Azuay Province in Ecuador into northern Peru's Department of Piura
- C. i. aurora, central and eastern Cajamarca Department in northwestern Peru
- C. i. flagrans, the western slope of the western Andes in Cajamarca Department.
- C. i. eva, the eastern slope of northern Peru's western Andes, west of the Marañón River
- C. i. fulgidiceps, Peru east of the Marañón River in southern Amazonas Department

The rainbow starfrontlet inhabits the edges of both humid and semi-humid cloudforest, gardens, and riparian scrub. In elevation it generally ranges from 1,700 to 3,300 m (5,600 to 10,800 ft) but has been recorded as high as 4,000 m (13,000 ft) in northern Peru's Huascarán National Park.

== Behavior ==
=== Movement ===
The rainbow starfrontlet is presumed to be sedentary.

=== Feeding ===
The rainbow starfrontlet forages for nectar by trap-lining, visiting a circuit of a wide variety of flowering plants, most of which have tubular red flowers. Examples include those of genera Embothrium, Fuchsia, Iochroma, Mutisia, Salvia, and Tilandsia. It usually forages within 2 to 4 m (7 to 10 ft) of the ground. In addition to feeding on nectar it captures small arthropods by hawking.

=== Breeding ===
The rainbow starfrontlet's breeding season lasts from November into January. The female builds a cup nest of small twigs, moss, and lichens lined with soft plant fibers. It is typically placed in the fork of a small branch. No further details of its breeding phenology have been documented.

=== Vocalization ===
During aerial chases, the rainbow starfrontlet makes a "thin, wiry chatter, rising and falling, with rattles and squeaky notes". It also makes "tsit" or "tip" notes.

== Status ==
The IUCN originally assessed the rainbow starfrontlet as Near Threatened but since 2004 has rated it as being of Least Concern. It has a large range. Its population size is not known and is believed to be decreasing. Its natural habitat is heavily fragmented but the effects of deforestation may be somewhat mitigated by the species' acceptance of human-made landscapes such as gardens and parks.
