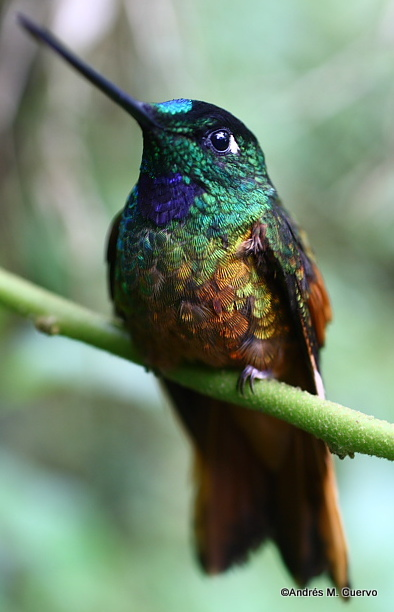

Conservation status
- Least Concern (IUCN 3.1)
- CITES Appendix II

Scientific classification
- Kingdom: Animalia
- Phylum: Chordata
- Class: Aves
- Order: Apodiformes
- Family: Trochilidae
- Genus: Coeligena
- Species: C. eos

Binomial name
- Coeligena eos (Gould, 1848)

Synonyms
- Coeligena bonapartei eos

= Golden-tailed starfrontlet =

Species of hummingbird

The golden-tailed starfrontlet (Coeligena eos) is a species of hummingbird in the "brilliants", tribe Heliantheini in subfamily Lesbiinae. It is endemic to Venezuela. It is also called the Mérida starfrontlet and golden starfrontlet.

== Taxonomy and systematics ==
The golden-bellied starfrontlet and most other members of genus Coeligena were at one time placed in genus Helianthea but have been in their current placement since the mid-1900s. The International Ornithological Committee (IOC), the Clements taxonomy, and BirdLife International's Handbook of the Birds of the World recognize the golden-tailed starfrontlet as a monotypic species, though each gives it a different English name. The South American Classification Committee of the American Ornithological Society (SACC) considers it to be a subspecies of the golden-bellied starfrontlet (C. bonapartei) but is seeking a proposal to elevate it to species status.

== Description ==
The golden-tailed starfrontlet is about 11.4 cm (4.5 in) long including its 3.0 cm (1.2 in) bill. Males weigh about of 6.8 g (0.24 oz) and females 6.4 g (0.23 oz). Both sexes have a white spot behind the eye. Adult males have a blackish crown with a glittering green forehead. Their upper back is shining golden green that transitions to the gold to golden orange rump. The throat and breast are glittering green and the throat has a small violet patch. The rest of the underparts are variable, from glittering coppery red to reddish gold. The undertail coverts are light cinnamon. The wings are dark with a rufous patch on the tertials. The slightly forked tail is rufous or cinnamon tipped with golden bronze. The adult female's forehead is plain green; the rest of the upperparts are colored like the male's but are duller. The throat is plain cinnamon buff and has green spots on its sides. The breast is mottled buff and green. The rest of the underparts are mostly cinnamon with a fiery gold belly and a coppery gold vent area.

== Distribution and habitat ==
The golden-tailed starfrontlet is found in the Andes of western Venezuela between the states of Lara and Táchira. It primarily inhabits the interior and edges of humid montane forest. It also occurs in dwarf forest and more open landscapes with scattered vegetation. In elevation it ranges from 1,400 to 3,200 m (4,600 to 10,500 ft).

== Behavior ==
=== Movement ===
The golden-tailed starfrontlet apparently moves to higher elevation during the rainy season.

=== Feeding ===
The golden-tailed starfrontlet gathers nectar from long tubular flowers, usually of low to medium height. It has been observed feeding at Ericaceae and at plants of genera Centropogon and Fuchsia. In addition to feeding on nectar it captures small arthropods by gleaning from foliage, hovering, and by hawking.

=== Breeding ===
The golden-tailed starfrontlet's breeding season appears to be from January to March. It makes a cup nest of moss, lichens, and rootlets lined with softer plant material, and typically attaches it to a vertical branch within vegetation. Nothing else is known about its breeding biology.

=== Vocalization ===
As of early 2023 neither xeno-canto nor the Cornell Lab of Ornithology's Macaulay Library had any recordings of the golden-tailed starfrontlet's vocalizations.

== Status ==
The IUCN has assessed the golden-tailed starfrontlet as being of Least Concern. It has a small range and an unknown population size that is believed to be decreasing. No immediate threats have been identified. Its "distribution coincides with areas of new human settlements and areas of interest for minerals exploitation."
