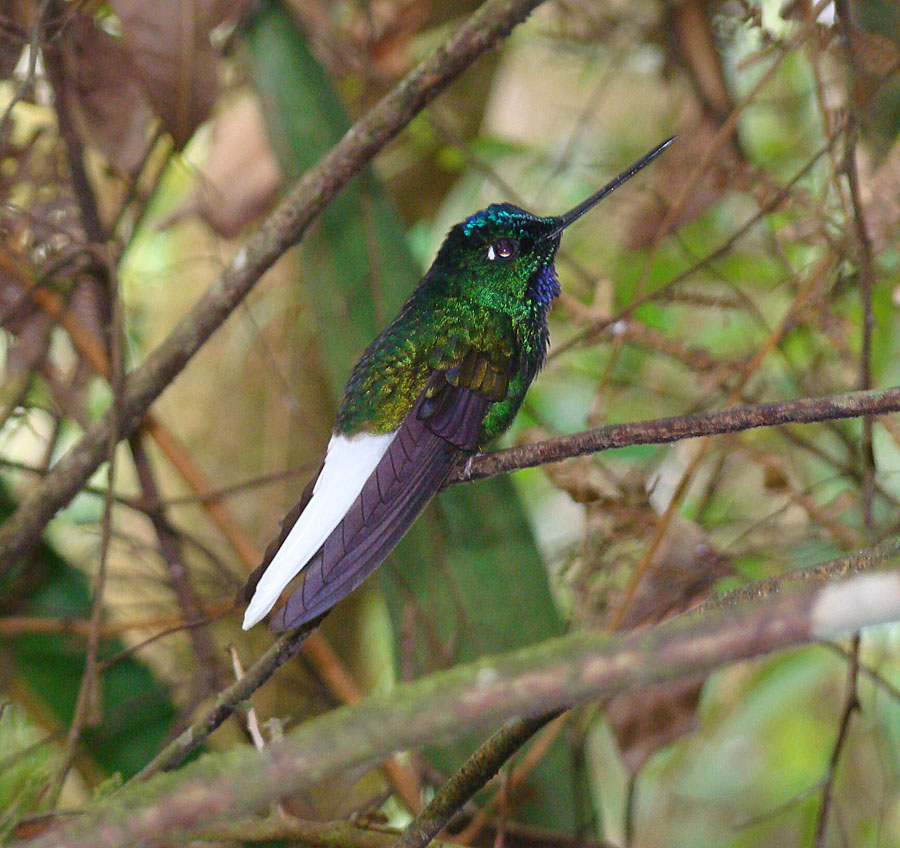

Conservation status
- Near Threatened (IUCN 3.1)
- CITES Appendix II

Scientific classification
- Kingdom: Animalia
- Phylum: Chordata
- Class: Aves
- Order: Apodiformes
- Family: Trochilidae
- Genus: Coeligena
- Species: C. phalerata

Binomial name
- Coeligena phalerata (Bangs, 1898)

Synonyms
- Leucuria phalerata

= White-tailed starfrontlet =

Species of hummingbird

The white-tailed starfrontlet (Coeligena phalerata) is a species of hummingbird in the "brilliants", tribe Heliantheini in subfamily Lesbiinae. It is endemic to the Sierra Nevada de Santa Marta of northeastern Colombia.

== Taxonomy and systematics ==
The white-tailed starfrontlet and most other members of genus Coeligena were at one time placed in genus Helianthea but have been in their current placement since the mid-1900s. The species is monotypic.

== Description ==
The white-tailed starfrontlet is about 14 cm (5.5 in) long. Both sexes have a long, straight, black bill, with the female's being somewhat longer than the male's. Both sexes have a white spot behind the eye. Both sexes also have a forked tail, but the male's is more deeply indented than the female's. Adult males have metallic dark green upperparts with a glittering turquoise crown. The entire tail is white, though the feathers when fresh have bronze tips. They have a blue gorget, mostly emerald green underparts, white leg puffs, and white undertail coverts. Adult females have a dusky blue-green crown and shining green upperparts. The tail is bronzy with pale buff tips to the feathers. Its underparts are rufous cinnamon. Immatures are similar to the adult female.

== Distribution and habitat ==
The white-tailed starfrontlet is found only in northeast Colombia's isolated Sierra Nevada de Santa Marta. It inhabits humid to wet montane forest; males prefer openings within the forest while females are more often seen at the forest edge. In elevation it ranges between 1,400 and 3,700 m (4,590 and 12,140 ft).

== Behavior ==
=== Movement ===
Nothing is known about the white-tailed starfrontlet's movements, if any.

=== Feeding ===
The white-tailed starfrontlet feeds on nectar. Sources are known to include Fuchsia and bromeliads, though it probably feeds on a wide variety of plants like others of its genus. It is more territorial than other Coeligena but also sometimes feeds by trap-lining. In addition to feeding on nectar it captures small arthropods by gleaning from foliage and by hawking.

=== Breeding ===
The white-tailed starfrontlet's breeding season appears to span from February to April, but nothing else is known about its breeding phenology.

=== Vocalization ===
Only a few white-tailed starfrontlet vocalizations have been recorded. It is known to make "a high-pitched chattering 'tsee-tsee-tsi-tsi-tsirrrrr' and lower-pitched short rattles."

== Status ==
The IUCN originally assessed the white-tailed starfrontlet as being of Least Concern but since 2018 has rated it as Near Threatened. It has a very small range "where it is under threat of habitat loss and fragmentation". Its population size is not known and is believed to be decreasing.
