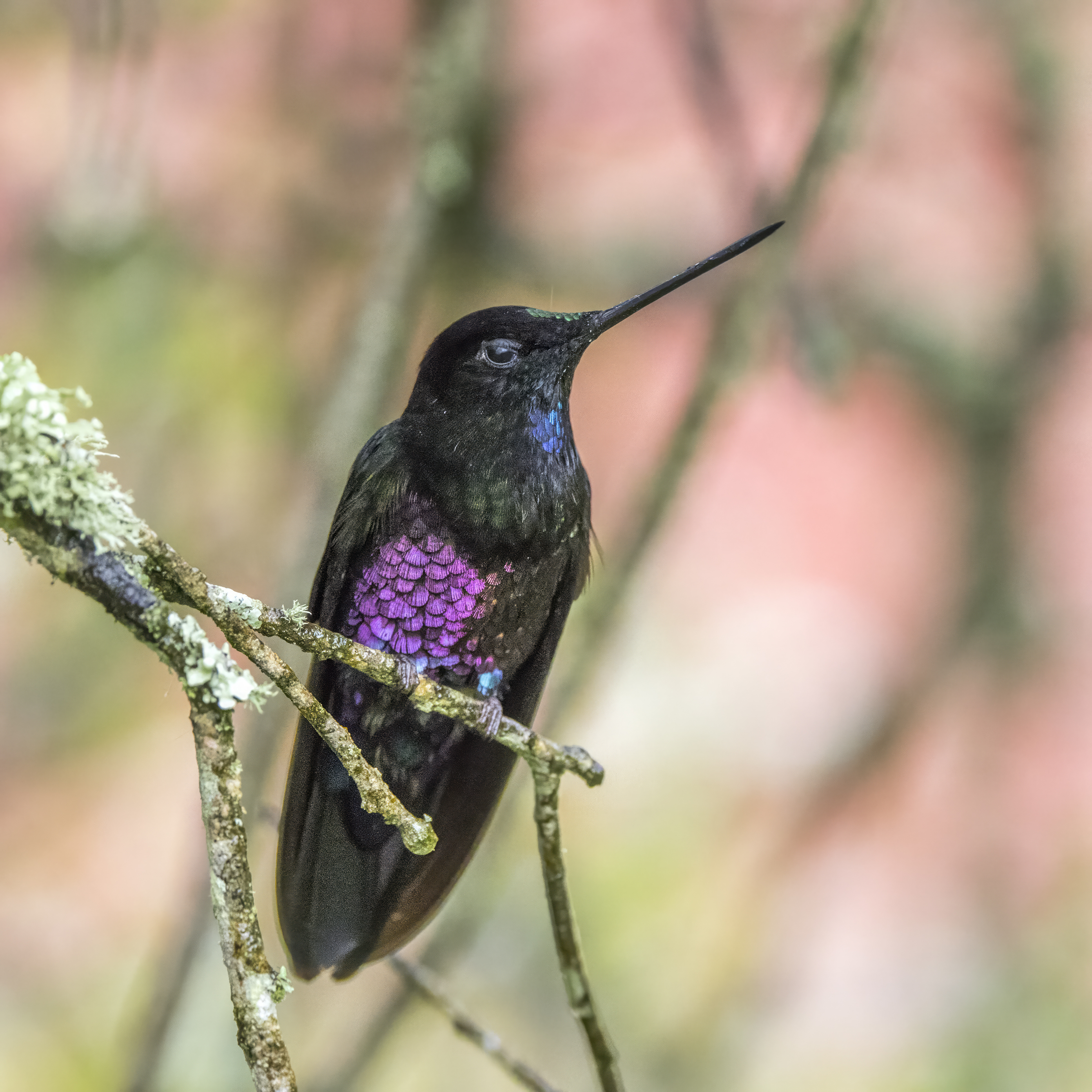
- Male
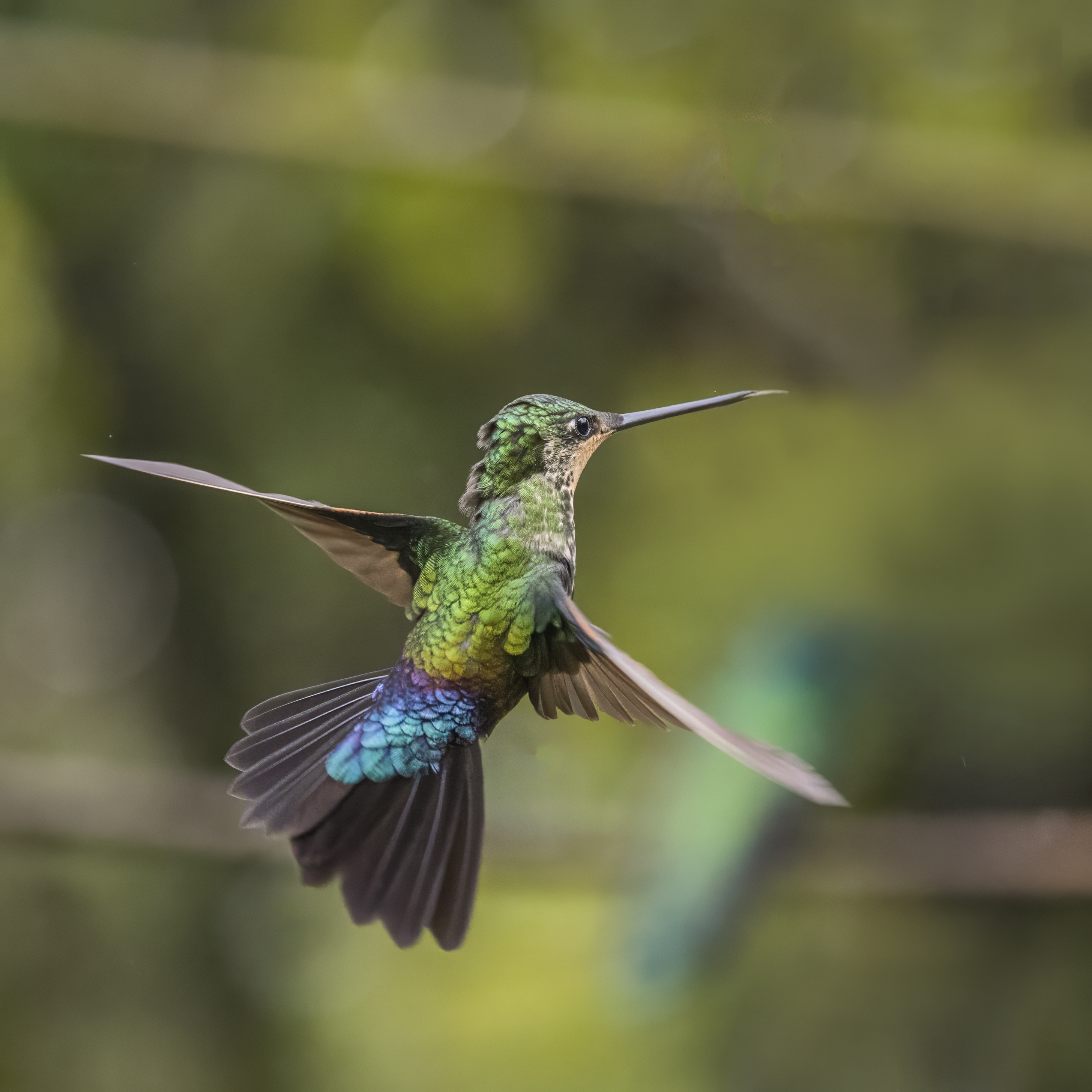
- Female both in Colombia

Conservation status
- Least Concern (IUCN 3.1)
- CITES Appendix II (CITES)

Scientific classification
- Kingdom: Animalia
- Phylum: Chordata
- Class: Aves
- Clade: Strisores
- Order: Apodiformes
- Family: Trochilidae
- Genus: Coeligena
- Species: C. helianthea

Binomial name
- Coeligena helianthea (Lesson, 1839)
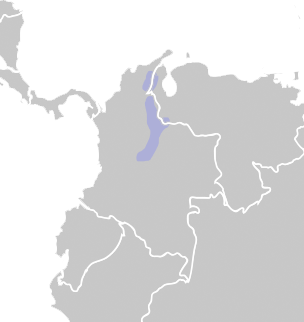

Synonyms
- Helianthea typica

= Blue-throated starfrontlet =

Species of hummingbird

The blue-throated starfrontlet (Coeligena helianthea) is a species of hummingbird in the "brilliants", tribe Heliantheini in subfamily Lesbiinae. It is found in Colombia and Venezuela.

== Taxonomy and systematics ==
The blue-throated starfrontlet and most other members of genus Coeligena were at one time placed in genus Helianthea but have been in their current placement since the mid-1900s. It has two subspecies, the nominate C. h. helianthea and C. h. tamai.

== Description ==
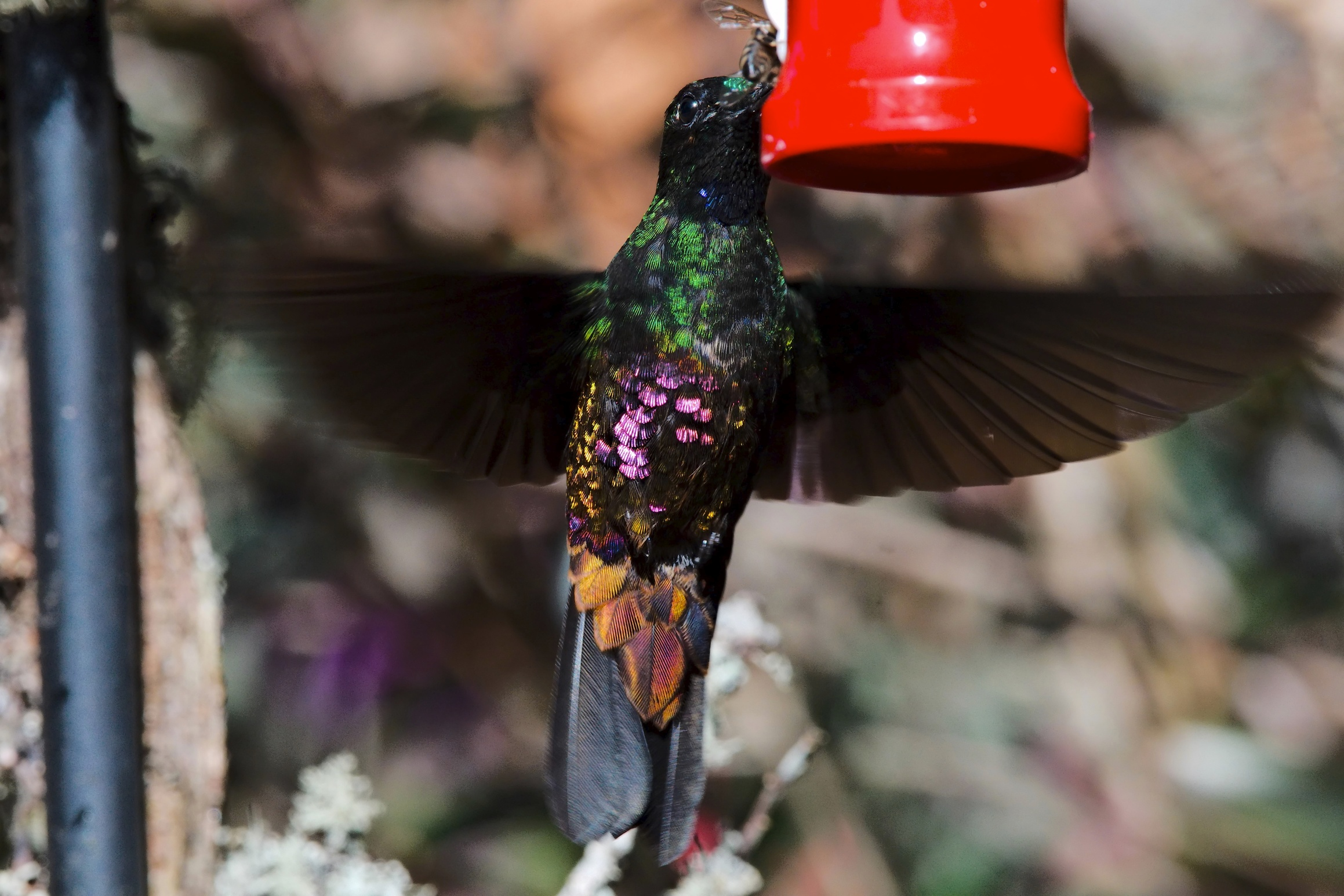
Blue-throated starfrontlet

The blue-throated starfrontlet is about 13 cm (5.1 in) long. Males weigh between 7.1 and 7.6 g (0.25 and 0.27 oz) and females 6 to 6.5 g (0.21 to 0.23 oz). Both sexes have a long, straight, black bill and white spot behind the eye. Both have bronzy black forked tails but the female's is less indented than the male's. In poor light the species may appear all dark. However, males of the nominate subspecies have a black head with a dark green forehead. Their upperparts are dark glossed with emerald green while the lower back and rump are dark blue with some violet. They have a dark iridescent violet throat, a dark gray breast with and emerald green sheen, and a rosy belly, vent area, and undertail coverts. Nominate females have a gray-green head including the forehead, and upperparts that are golden green transitioning to the blue-violet rump; all of these colors are duller than those of the male. The throat and breast are rufous, with green spots on the latter. The belly is rosy and the undertail coverts a paler rose.

Males of subspecies C. h. tamai are very similar to those of the nominate but duller. The male's belly and undertail coverts are more bluish than rosy. The females are essentially the same as the nominate.

== Distribution and habitat ==
The nominate subspecies of blue-throated starfrontlet is found in Colombia's northern and eastern Andes from the Serranía del Perijá, which straddles the border between northern Colombia and northwestern Venezuela, south and west to the Metropolitan Area of Bogotá. C. h. tamai is found in the Tamá Massif in the western Venezuelan state of Táchira. The species inhabits the interior and edges of cloudforest and elfin forest, shrubby slopes, and sometimes bushy landscapes at the lower margin of páramo. It also occurs in flowering gardens. In elevation it ranges between 1,900 and 3,300 m (6,200 and 10,800 ft).

== Behavior ==
=== Movement ===
Details of the blue-throated starfrontlet's movements are unknown, but it likely makes season elevational changes.

=== Feeding ===
The blue-throated starfrontlet feeds on nectar by trap-lining, visiting a circuit of a wide variety of flowering plants. It tends to forage within a few meters of the ground. In addition to feeding on nectar it captures small arthropods by gleaning from foliage and sometimes by hawking.

=== Breeding ===
The blue-throated starfrontlet's breeding season spans from May to October. Nothing else is known about its breeding phenology.

=== Vocalization ===
The blue-throated starfrontlet's voice is poorly known. It does make "single, strident 'chit' notes."

== Status ==
The IUCN has assessed the blue-throated starfrontlet as being of Least Concern, though its population size and trend are not known. Though it is considered locally common and accepts human-made habitats, "its natural habitat is under threat of deforestation."
