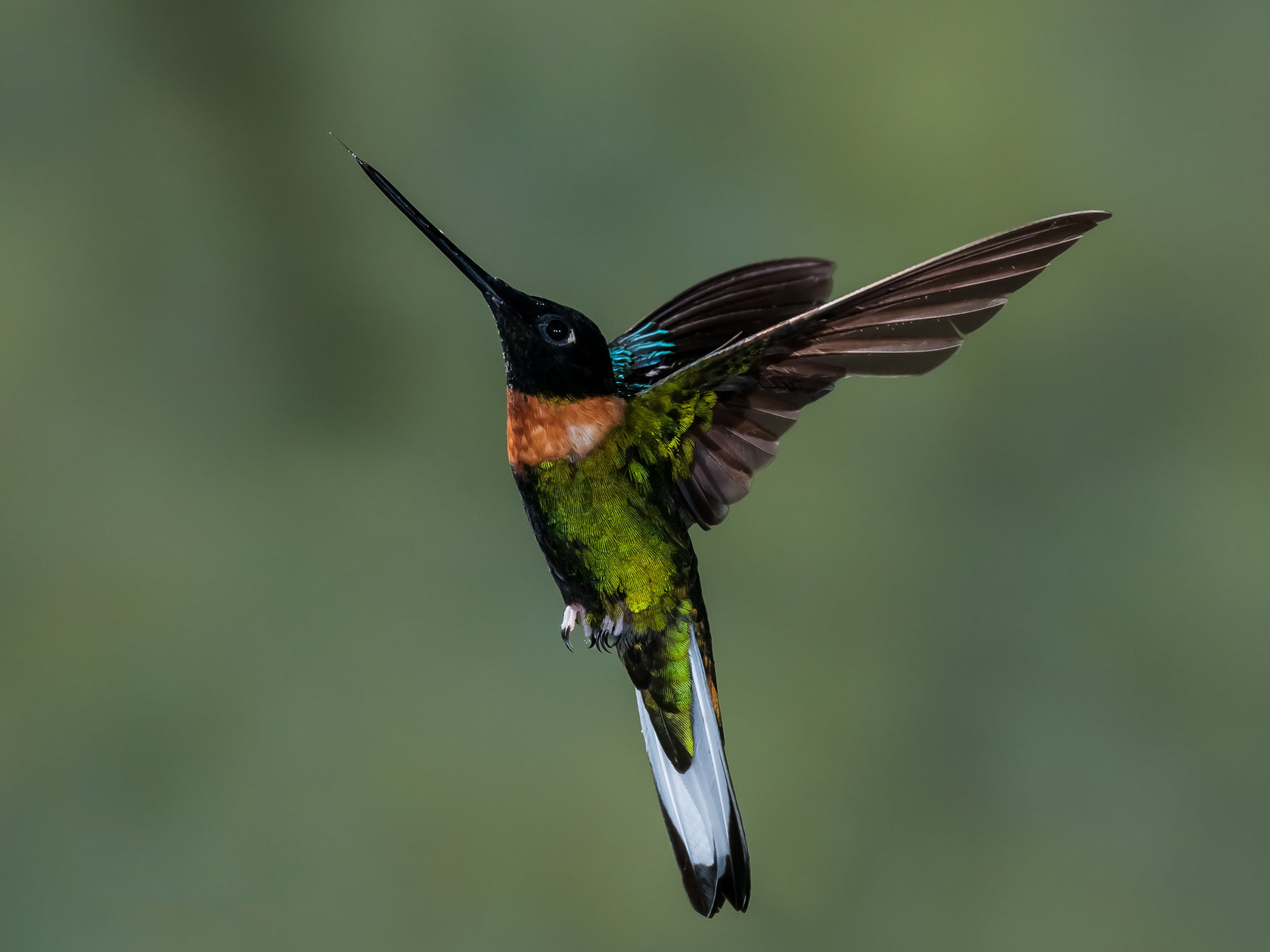
- At Machu Picchu, Peru

Conservation status
- Least Concern (IUCN 3.1)
- CITES Appendix II

Scientific classification
- Kingdom: Animalia
- Phylum: Chordata
- Class: Aves
- Order: Apodiformes
- Family: Trochilidae
- Genus: Coeligena
- Species: C. inca

Binomial name
- Coeligena inca (Gould, 1852)

= Gould's inca =

Species of hummingbird

Gould's inca (Coeligena inca) is a species of hummingbird in subfamily Lesbiinae, the so-called "typical hummingbirds", of family Trochilidae. It is found in Bolivia and Peru.

== Taxonomy and systematics ==
The International Ornithological Committee (IOC), the Clements taxonomy, and BirdLife International's Handbook of the Birds of the World (HBW) recognize Gould's inca as a species. The South American Classification Committee of the American Ornithological Society treats it as a subspecies of the collared inca (C. torquata) but is seeking a proposal to recognize it as a species.

According to the IOC, Clements, and HBW, Gould's inca has two subspecies, the nominate C. t. inca (Gould, 1852) and C. t. omissa (Zimmer, J.T., 1948).

== Description ==
Gould's inca is about 14.5 cm (5.7 in) long and weighs 6.8 to 7.2 g (0.24 to 0.25 oz). Adult males of the nominate subspecies have a mostly velvety black head with a green forehead and a small white spot behind the eye. The rest of their upperparts are golden green that is shinier on the lower back. Their central pair of tail feathers is bronze-green and the rest are white with bronze-green tips. Their throat is black, their upper breast collar orange, their belly glittering green, and their undertail coverts golden-green with white fringes. Nominate adult females have a lighter black head than males, and with golden-green spots. The rest of their upperparts are shining golden green. Their collar is rufous, usually with some green spots on the side, their breast glittering green, and their lower belly green with a rufous wash and large golden green spots. Juveniles resemble adult females. Subspecies C. t. omissa is similar to the nominate but has a bluish forehead, a greener throat, and mostly dark green rather than golden green upper- and underparts.

== Distribution and habitat ==
The nominate subspecies of Gould's inca is found in the Andes of Bolivia in the departments of La Paz and Cochabamba. Subspecies C. t. omissa is found in the Peruvian Andes between Cuzco and Puno departments. The species inhabits the understory and lower canopy of wet montane forest. In elevation it ranges between 1,600 and 3,200 m (5,200 and 10,500 ft).

== Behavior ==
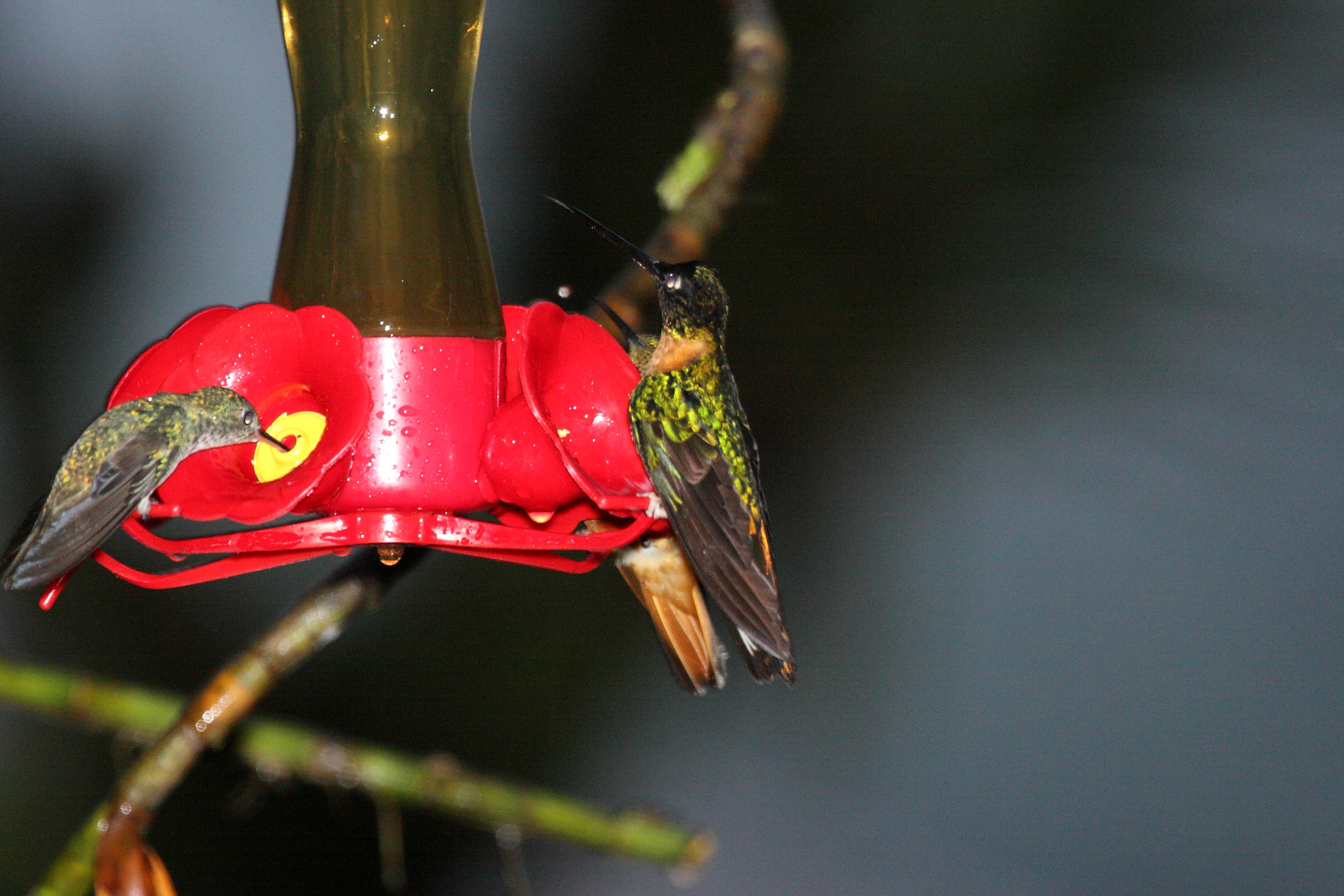
Drinking nectar from hummingbird feeder, Aguas Calientes

=== Movement ===
As far as is known, Gould's inca is a year-round resident throughout its range, but it might make short-distance seasonal movements.

=== Feeding ===
Gould's inca forages by trap-lining, visiting a circuit of flowering plants. It feeds on nectar from a variety of plants, mostly those with long tubular flowers. It also catches insects by hawking from a perch or by gleaning while hovering.

=== Breeding ===
Gould's inca makes a cup nest of moss lined with fern scales. Most of those known were placed on a stick or root projecting from a rocky cliff beneath a mossy overhang. The clutch size is one or two eggs. The incubation period is not known; the time to fledging is about 23 days. The female alone incubates the clutch and cares for nestlings.

=== Vocalization ===
The vocalization's of Gould's inca have not been described. Xeno-canto includes recordings within those of the collared inca. As of early 2023 Cornell Lab of Ornithology's Macaulay Library had one recording.

== Status ==
The IUCN has assessed Gould's inca as being of Least Concern. It has a restricted range and its population size is not known and is believed to be decreasing. No immediate threats have been identified. "[S]ince its habitat, humid montane cloudforest, is under heavy threat of destruction, [the] species could suffer in the near future."
