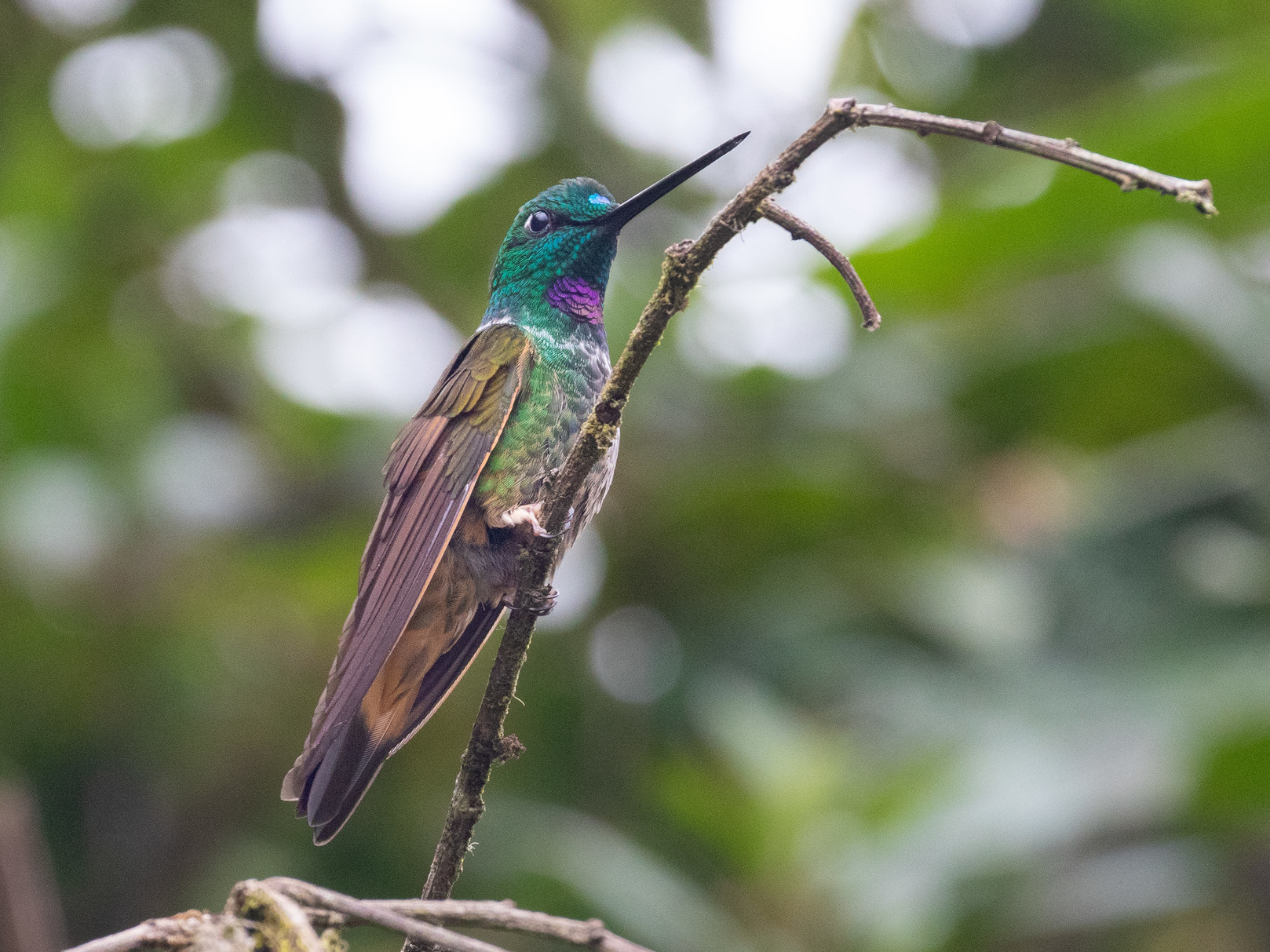

Conservation status
- Least Concern (IUCN 3.1)
- CITES Appendix II

Scientific classification
- Kingdom: Animalia
- Phylum: Chordata
- Class: Aves
- Order: Apodiformes
- Family: Trochilidae
- Genus: Coeligena
- Species: C. violifer

Binomial name
- Coeligena violifer (Gould, 1846)

Synonyms
- Helianthea violifera; Helianthea dichroura (Coeligena violifer dichroura); Helianthea osculans (Coeligena violifer osculans)

= Violet-throated starfrontlet =

Species of hummiingbird

The violet-throated starfrontlet (Coeligena violifer) is a species of hummingbird in the "brilliants", tribe Heliantheini in subfamily Lesbiinae. It is found in Bolivia and Peru and possibly Ecuador.

== Taxonomy and systematics ==
The violet-throated starfrontlet and most other members of genus Coeligena were at one time placed in genus Helianthea but have been in their current placement since the mid-1900s. Its taxonomy is otherwise unsettled. The South American Classification Committee of the American Ornithological Society (SACC), the International Ornithological Committee (IOC), and the Clements taxonomy all treat it as one species with four subspecies. However, BirdLife International's Handbook of the Birds of the World (HBW) treats each of those subspecies as a separate species. The subspecies are:

- C. v. dichroura ("Huanuco" starfrontlet) Taczanowski (1874)
- C. v. albicaudata ("Apurimac" starfrontlet) Schuchmann & Züchner (1998)
- C. v. osculans ("Cuzco" starfrontlet) Gould (1871)
- C. v. violifer ("Bolivian" starfrontlet) Gould (1846)

== Description ==
All four subspecies of violet-throated starfrontlet are 13 to 14.5 cm (5.1 to 5.7 in) long. All have long, straight, black bills, with the females' being longer than the males'. Both sexes of all subspecies have a white spot behind the eye. Both sexes have a forked tail, with the male's more deeply indented than the female's.

Males of the nominate subspecies weigh 8 to 13 g (0.28 to 0.46 oz) and females 4 to 6 g (0.14 to 0.21 oz). The male's head is blackish blue and the back shining bronzy green. The tail is orange-buff with small bronzy tips. The throat and upper breast are green with an iridescent violet spot on the throat. A thin gray band separates the upper breast from the green lower breast and cinnamon belly. The nominate female has a green head, a buff throat with green spots, and a darkish green breast.

Males of subspecies C. v. dichroura weigh 4 to 10 g (0.14 to 0.35 oz) and females about 7.9 g (0.28 oz). Males have an emerald green forehead, a bluish throat patch, a whitish chest band, and a wide bronzy band at the end of the tail. The female is similar but without the throat patch.

Subspecies C. v. albicaudata weighs 6 to 12 g (0.21 to 0.42 oz). Males have a bottle green head with an iridescent turquoise forehead and a shiny golden copper back. The outer tail feathers are whitish to pale green at the end and the others a darker green. The chin is moss green, the throat patch violet, the breast moss green, and the belly golden green. Females are similar to those of the nominate violifer but with the same tail colors as this subspecies' males.

Males of subspecies C. v. osculans weigh 5 to 11 g (0.18 to 0.39 oz) and females 5 to 7 g (0.18 to 0.25 oz). Males have a greenish turquoise forehead and a dark shining green crown. The tail has a narrow bronzy band at the end. The throat spot is variable and the belly pale cinnamon. The female is similar but does not have the turquoise forehead or throat patch.

== Distribution and habitat ==
According to the IOC and Clements taxonomies, the subspecies are distributed thus:

- C. v. dichroura ("Huanoco"), the Andes of Ecuador's Loja Province south into Peru as far as the departments of Junín, Huánuco, and Lima (But see below.)
- C. v. albicaudata ("Apurimac"), the Andean Apurímac River valley in the southern Peruvian departments of Ayacucho, Apurímac, and Cuzco
- C. v. osculans ("Cuzco"), the Andes of Cuzco and Puno departments of southeastern Peru
- C. v. violifer ("Bolivian"), the Andes of northwestern Bolivia's La Paz and Cochabamba departments (The map shows the range of only this subspecies.)

However, the SACC does not recognize any records of the species in Ecuador and HBW does not include Ecuador in the range of the "Huanuco" starfrontlet.

The four subspecies of violet-throated starfrontlet differ somewhat in their habitats. C. v. dichroura is usually found at the edges and in clearings of cloudforest and elfin forest but also in secondary forest, at elevations between 1,900 and 3,700 m (6,200 and 12,100 ft). C. v. albicaudata is found in the understory of elfin forest between 2,250 and 3,600 m (7,380 and 11,800 ft). C. v. osculans, like dichroura, is usually found at the edges and in clearings of cloudforest and elfin forest but also in secondary forest, but at elevations between 2,000 and 3,700 m (6,600 and 12,100 ft). C. v. violifer is also found at the edges and in clearings of cloudforest and elfin forest and in secondary forest. In elevation it ranges between 1,300 and 3,700 m (4,300 and 12,100 ft) but is most common between 2,800 and 3,300 m (9,200 and 10,800 ft).

== Behavior ==
=== Movement ===
Data suggest that three of the violet-throated starfrontlet subspecies make seasonal elevational movements. There is no information on the movements of C. v. albicaudata.

=== Feeding ===
The nominate subspecies of violet-throated starfrontlet forages for nectar by trap-lining, visiting a circuit of a variety of flowering plants. Examples include genera Vriesea, Bomarea, and Fuchsia. It tends to nectar the edges of vegetation. In addition to feeding on nectar it gleans small arthropods from vegetation and captures them by hawking. The feeding practices and diets of the other three subspecies have not been studied but are presumed to be similar to those of the nominate.

=== Breeding ===
The nominate subspecies of violet-throated starfrontlet's breeding season is from November to January. That of C. v. albicaudata apparently begins in July or August. No further information is known about their breeding phenology or that of the other subspecies.

=== Vocalization ===
What is thought to be the song of the nominate subspecies of violet-throated starfrontlet is "a mellow drawn-out whistle followed by three nasal notes 'drreeeuw…nyeh-nyeh-nyeh'." It also makes "very sweet and mellow" single or double notes. The presumed songs of both C. v. albicaudata and C. v. osculans are a "rhythmic phrase, 'wet-tsee-tser'" alternating with high-pitched notes, though they have slight differences. The song of C. v. dichroura is a "long series of single 'tchit' notes". In flight it gives "a jerky mix of squeaky notes and rattles".

== Status ==
The IUCN follows HBW taxonomy and so treats the four subspecies as separate species. All are assessed as being of Least Concern, though their population sizes are not known and all are believed to be decreasing. All four have somewhat restricted ranges that at least in part are undergoing deforestation. However, "since [the species] inhabits open forest and clearings, it may accept these disturbed areas to some extent."
