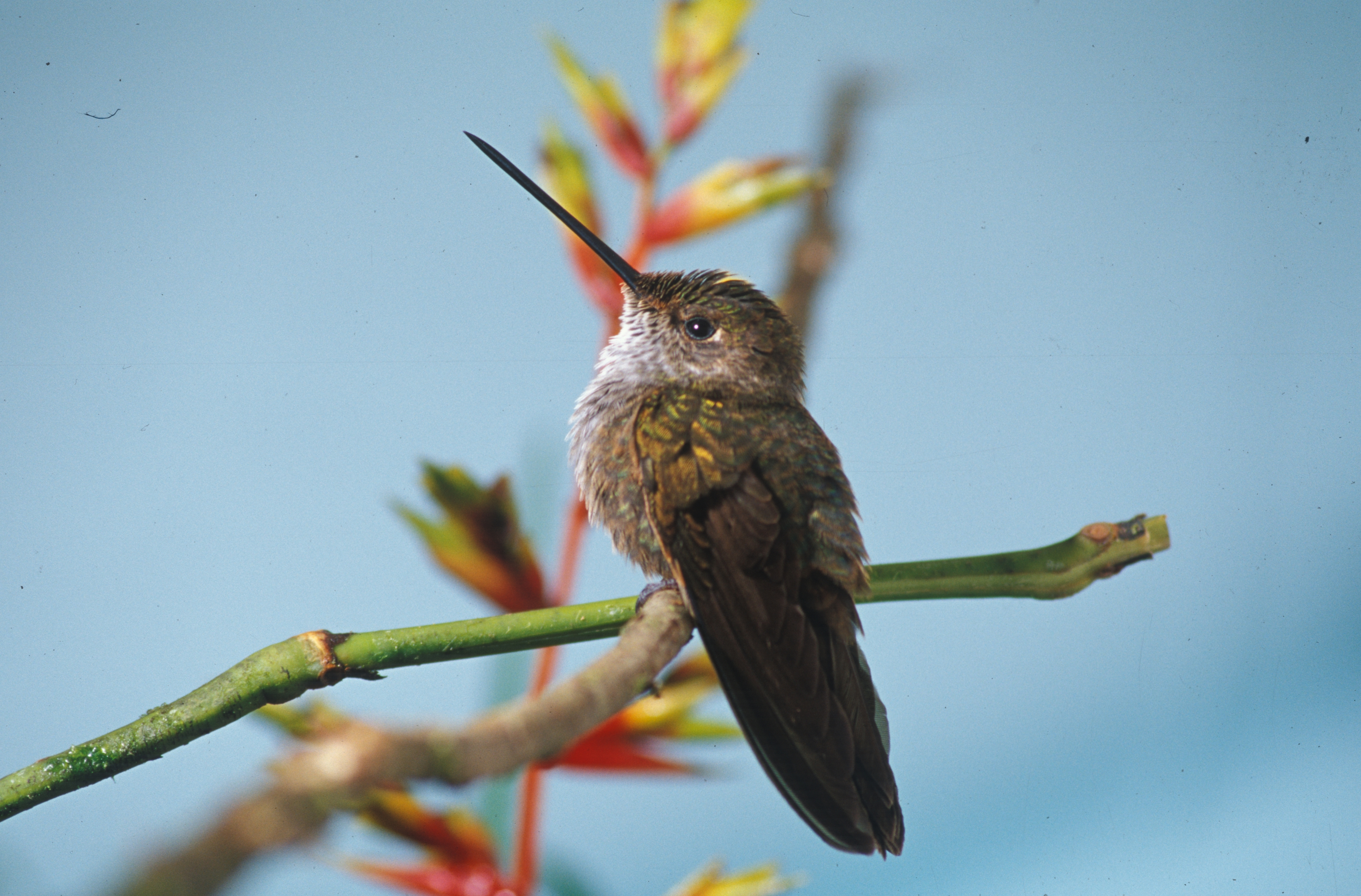

Conservation status
- Least Concern (IUCN 3.1)
- CITES Appendix II (CITES)

Scientific classification
- Kingdom: Animalia
- Phylum: Chordata
- Class: Aves
- Clade: Strisores
- Order: Apodiformes
- Family: Trochilidae
- Genus: Coeligena
- Species: C. coeligena

Binomial name
- Coeligena coeligena (Lesson, 1833)

= Bronzy inca =

Species of hummingbirdbird

The bronzy inca (Coeligena coeligena) is a species of hummingbird in the "brilliants", tribe Heliantheini in subfamily Lesbiinae. It is found in Bolivia, Colombia, Ecuador, Peru, and Venezuela.

== Taxonomy and systematics ==
The bronzy inca and most other members of genus Coeligena were at one time placed in genus Helianthea but have been in their current placement since the mid-1900s. The species has these six subspecies:

- C. c. ferruginea (Chapman, 1917) – west, central Colombia
- C. c. columbiana (Elliot, DG, 1876) – east, central Colombia and northwest Venezuela
- C. c. coeligena (Lesson, RP, 1833) – north Venezuela
- C. c. zuliana Phelps, WH & Phelps, WH Jr, 1953 – Serranía del Perijá (northeast Colombia and west Venezuela)
- C. c. obscura (Berlepsch & Stolzmann, 1902) – south Colombia, Ecuador and Peru
- C. c. boliviana (Gould, 1861) – central, southeast Bolivia

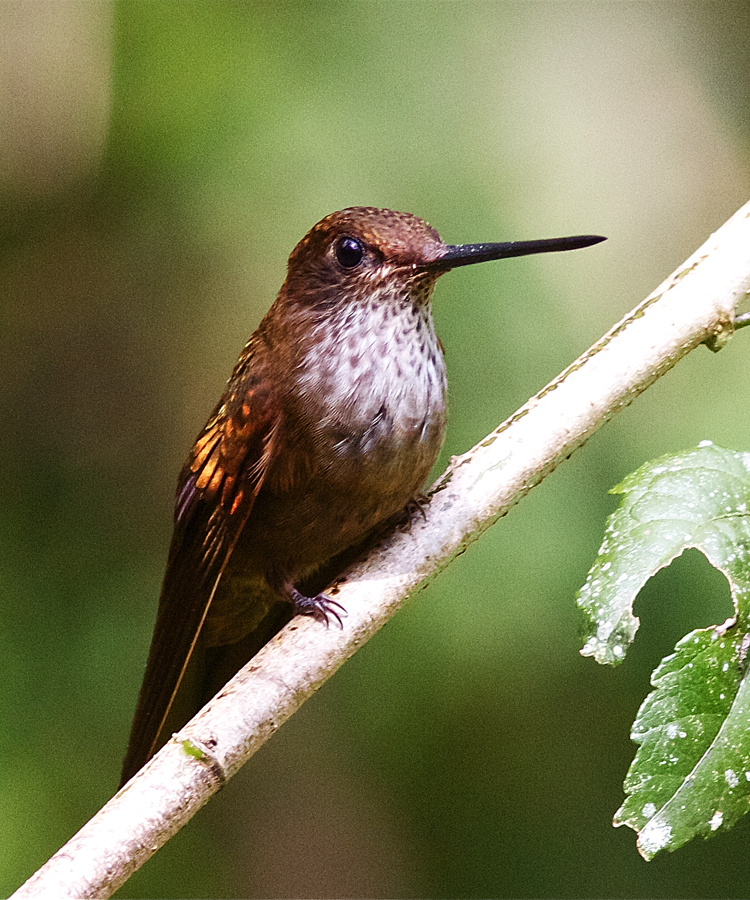
Bronzy Inca, photo taken at San Isidro Lodge (east slope), Ecuador.

== Description ==
The bronzy inca is about 14 cm (5.5 in) long. Males weigh about 7.3 g (0.26 oz) and females about 6.2 g (0.22 oz). Males have a long, straight, black bill, often with some yellow at the base of the mandible; the female's bill is also straight and black but somewhat longer. The species is the drabbest member of genus Coeligena, some others of which are rather dramatically plumaged.

Adult males of the nominate subspecies are mostly dark bronzy brown with a maroon sheen above; the lower back is greenish. They have a white spot behind the eye. Their throat and chest have white spots and dusky gray streaks, and the rest of the underparts are reddish brown. The forked tail is bronze. Adult nominate females are essentially the same as males but for bill length and a less forked tail, and juveniles resemble the adult female.

Subspecies C. c. zuliana is slightly more greenish and less bronzy than the nominate. C. c. columbiana is smaller than the nominate and has more of an olive shade. C. c. ferruginea is similar to the nominate but with less white on the throat and a tawny wash to the underparts. C. c. obscura is the darkest subspecies, with a blackish back and a grayish, not white, throat. C. c. boliviana has dark green spots on the crown and a bronzy blackish purple tail.

== Distribution and habitat ==
The subspecies of bronzy inca are distributed thus:

- C. c. ferruginea, Colombia's Central and Western Andes
- C. c. columbiana, Andes from northwestern Venezuela's Lara state south into Colombia's Eastern Andes to Huila Department
- C. c. coeligena, northern Venezuela from Falcón east to Miranda
- C. c. zuliana, Serranía del Perijá of northern Colombia and northwestern Venezuela
- C. c. obscura, east slope of the Andes from Colombia's Nariño Department south through Ecuador and Peru
- C. c. boliviana, east slope of the Andes of central and southeastern Bolivia

The bronzy inca primarily inhabits the edges of humid pre-montane forest, though it also occurs in more open landscapes of scattered trees and in coffee plantations. In elevation it ranges between 1,500 and 2,600 m (4,900 and 8,500 ft).

== Behavior ==
=== Movement ===
The bronzy inca makes some seasonal movements that have not been fully defined.

=== Feeding ===
The bronzy inca forages for nectar by trap-lining, visiting a circuit of a wide variety of flowering plants. It seldom feeds above the mid-story of the forest, though it has been observed feeding in the canopy. In addition to nectar it captures small arthropods by hawking and hover-gleaning.

=== Breeding ===
The bronzy inca's breeding season spans from November to March. It builds a cup nest of moss and plant fibers, typically 1 to 1.5 m (3 to 5 ft) above ground and well hidden in vegetation. The female alone incubates the clutch of two eggs for 15 to 16 days; fledging occurs 22 to 24 days after hatch.

=== Vocalization ===
What is thought to be the bronzy inca's song is "a continuous series of single rather sweet 'tseet' notes". Its calls include single "tsee" or "tzeet" notes, usually during flight.

== Status ==
The IUCN has assessed the bronzy inca as being of Least Concern. It has a very larger range, and though its population size is unknown it is believed to be stable. It occurs in several protected areas, and because it readily accepts some human-altered landscapes deforestation does not appear to be a major threat.
