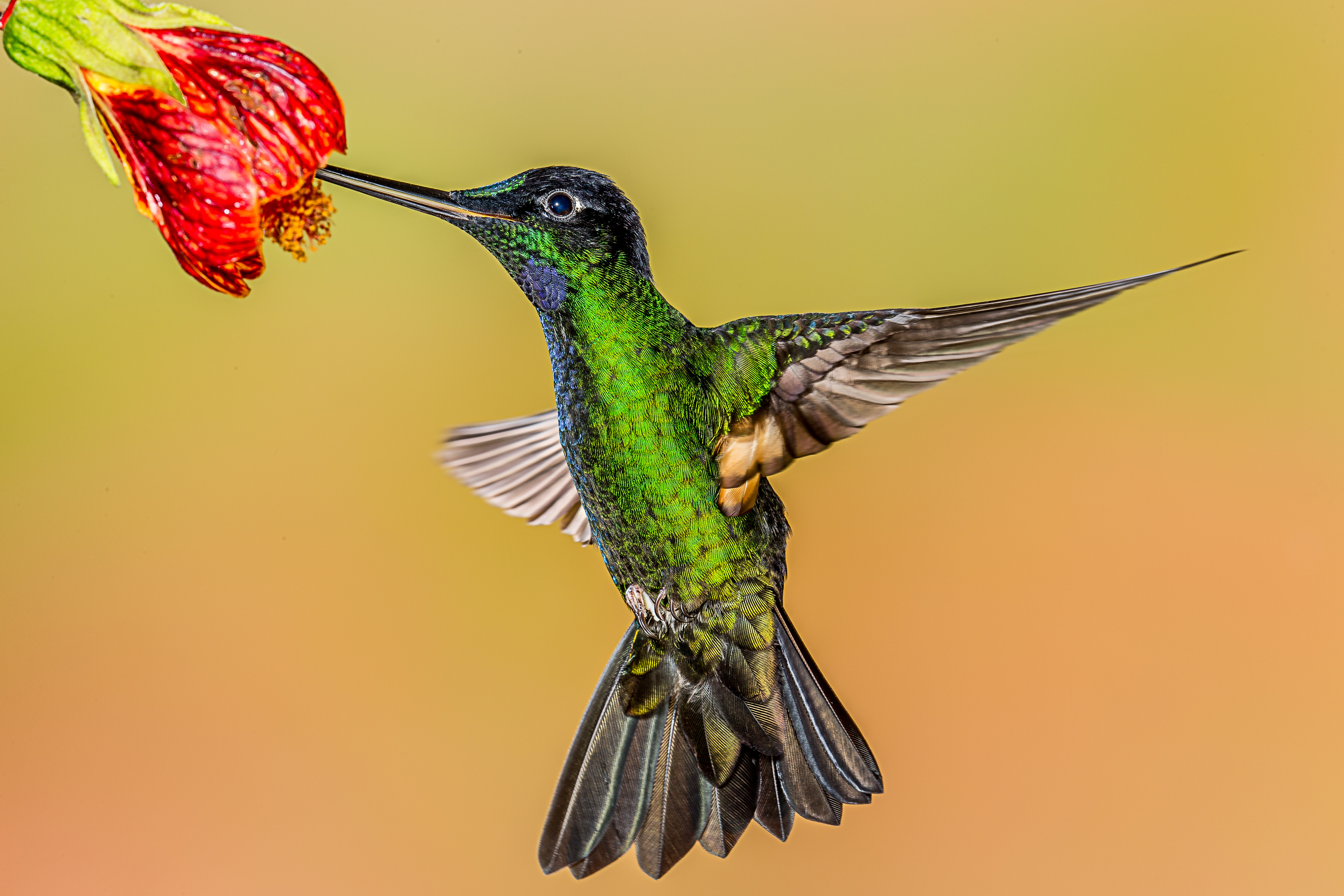
- Male
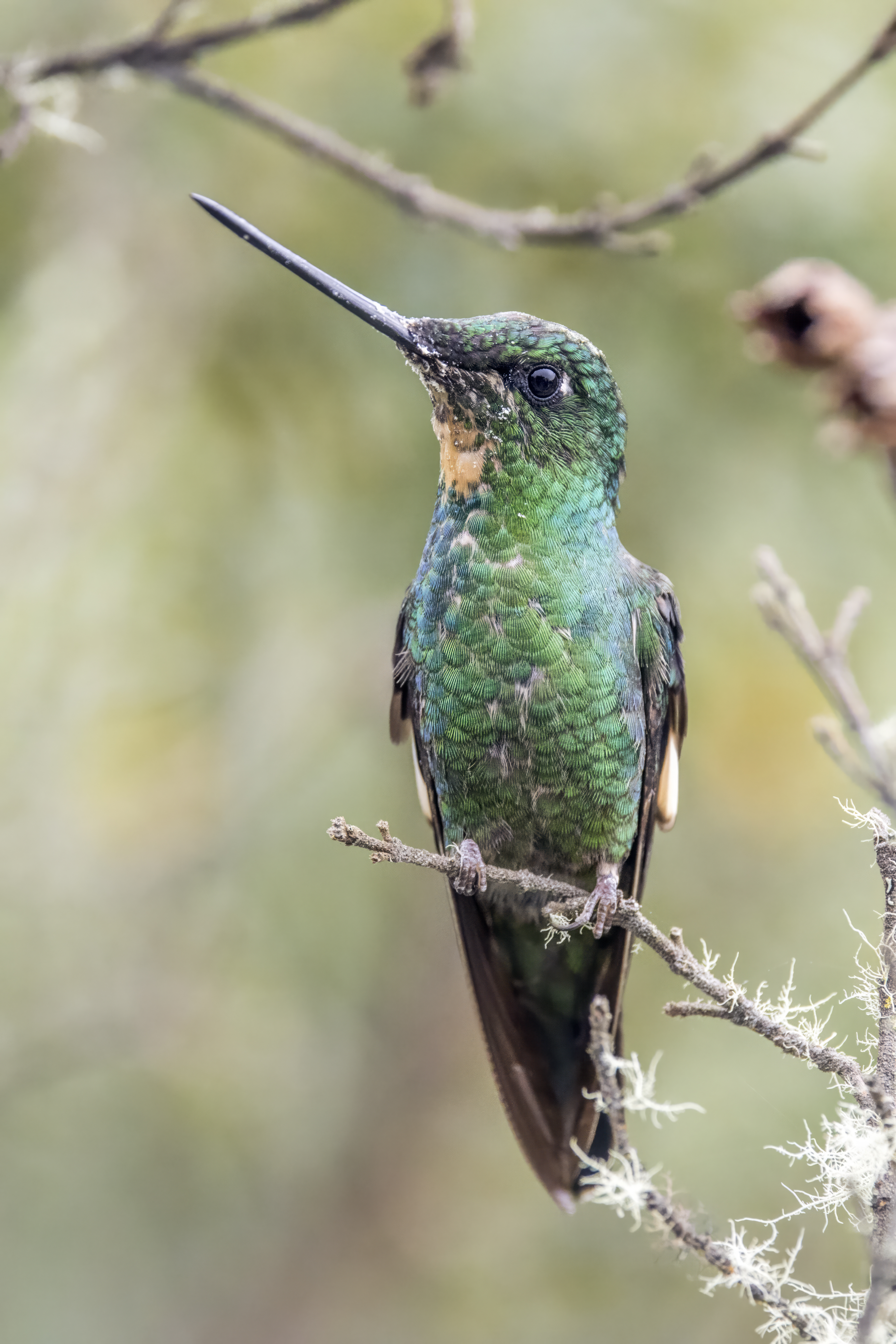
- Female both L. l. lutetiae, Colombia

Conservation status
- Least Concern (IUCN 3.1)
- CITES Appendix II

Scientific classification
- Kingdom: Animalia
- Phylum: Chordata
- Class: Aves
- Order: Apodiformes
- Family: Trochilidae
- Genus: Coeligena
- Species: C. lutetiae

Binomial name
- Coeligena lutetiae (Delattre & Bourcier, 1846)

= Buff-winged starfrontlet =

Species of hummingbird

The buff-winged starfrontlet (Coeligena lutetiae) is a species of hummingbird in the "brilliants", tribe Heliantheini in subfamily Lesbiinae. It is found in Colombia, Ecuador, and Peru.

== Taxonomy and systematics ==
The buff-winged starfrontlet and most other members of genus Coeligena were at one time placed in genus Helianthea but have been in their current placement since the mid-1900s. The International Ornithological Committee (IOC) and BirdLife International's Handbook of the Birds of the World (HBW) recognize two subspecies, the nominate C. l. lutetiae and C. l. albimaculata. However, the Clements taxonomy treats the species as monotypic.

== Description ==
The buff-winged starfrontlet is about 14 cm (5.5 in) long. Males weigh 6.9 to 7.2 g (0.24 to 0.25 oz) and females about 6.6 g (0.23 oz). Both sexes have a long, black, slightly upturned bill and a white spot behind the eye. Both sexes have a forked tail though the female's is not as deeply indented as the male's. Males of the nominate subspecies has velvety black upperparts with a glittering green forehead. They have a violet gorget and the rest of the underparts are dark green. The wings are dark with a large cinnamon-buff patch and the tail is bronzy black. Nominate females have shining dark green upperparts. Their throat is cinnamon-buff and the rest of the underparts golden green with pale fringes on the feathers. They have the same cinnamon-buff wing patch as the males but the tail is bronzy green.

Males of subspecies C. l. albimaculata have almost white wing patches but are otherwise like the nominate. Females have a paler throat than the nominate and a cinnamon tinge to the underparts, whose golden green is also less iridescent.

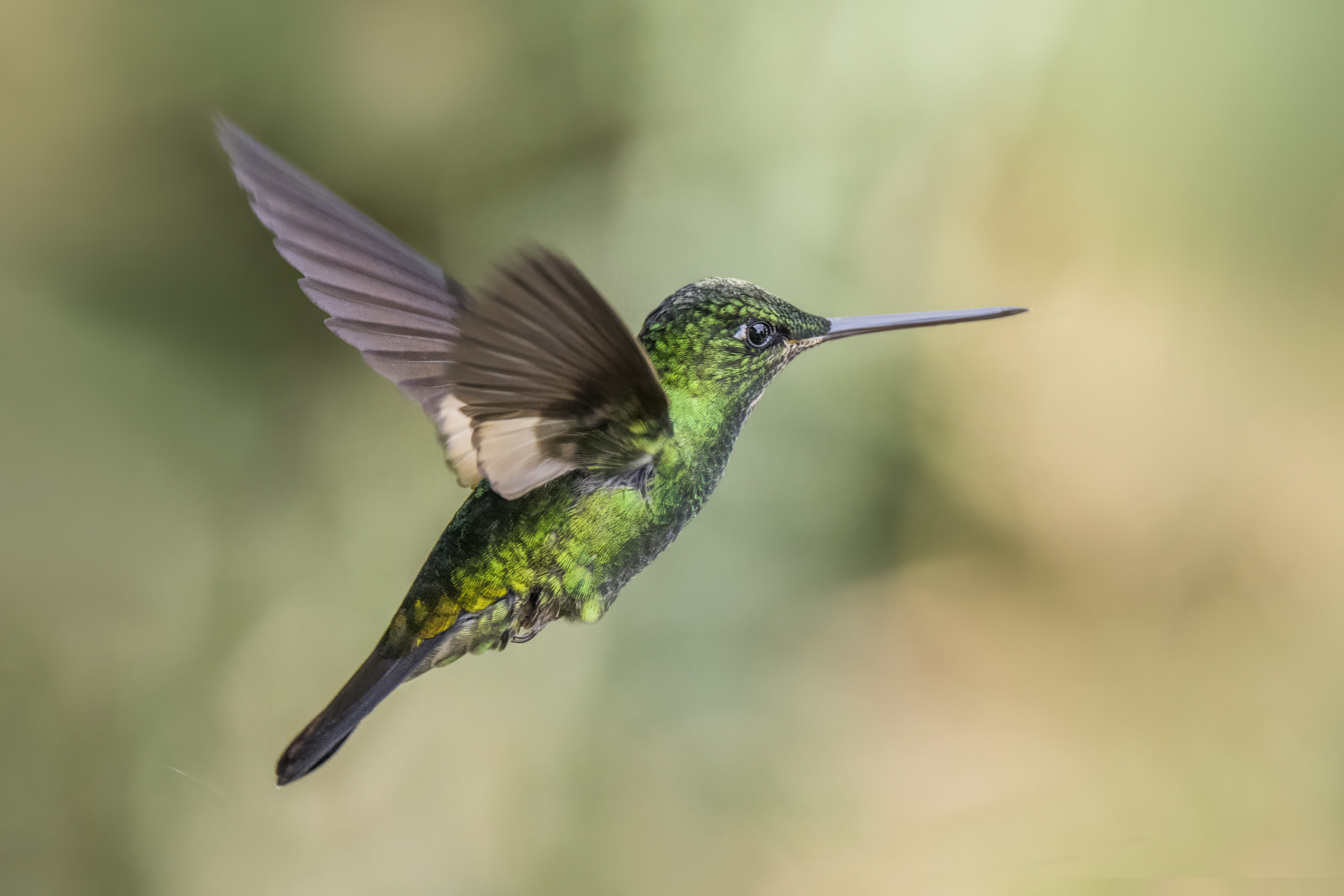
young male C. l. lutetiae, Colombia

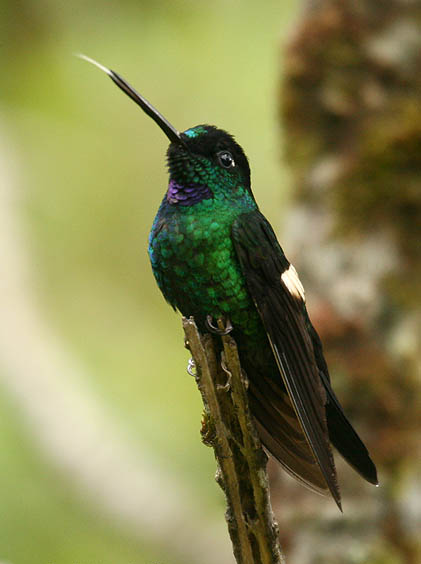
male C. l. albimaculata
Yanacocha Reserve, Ecuador

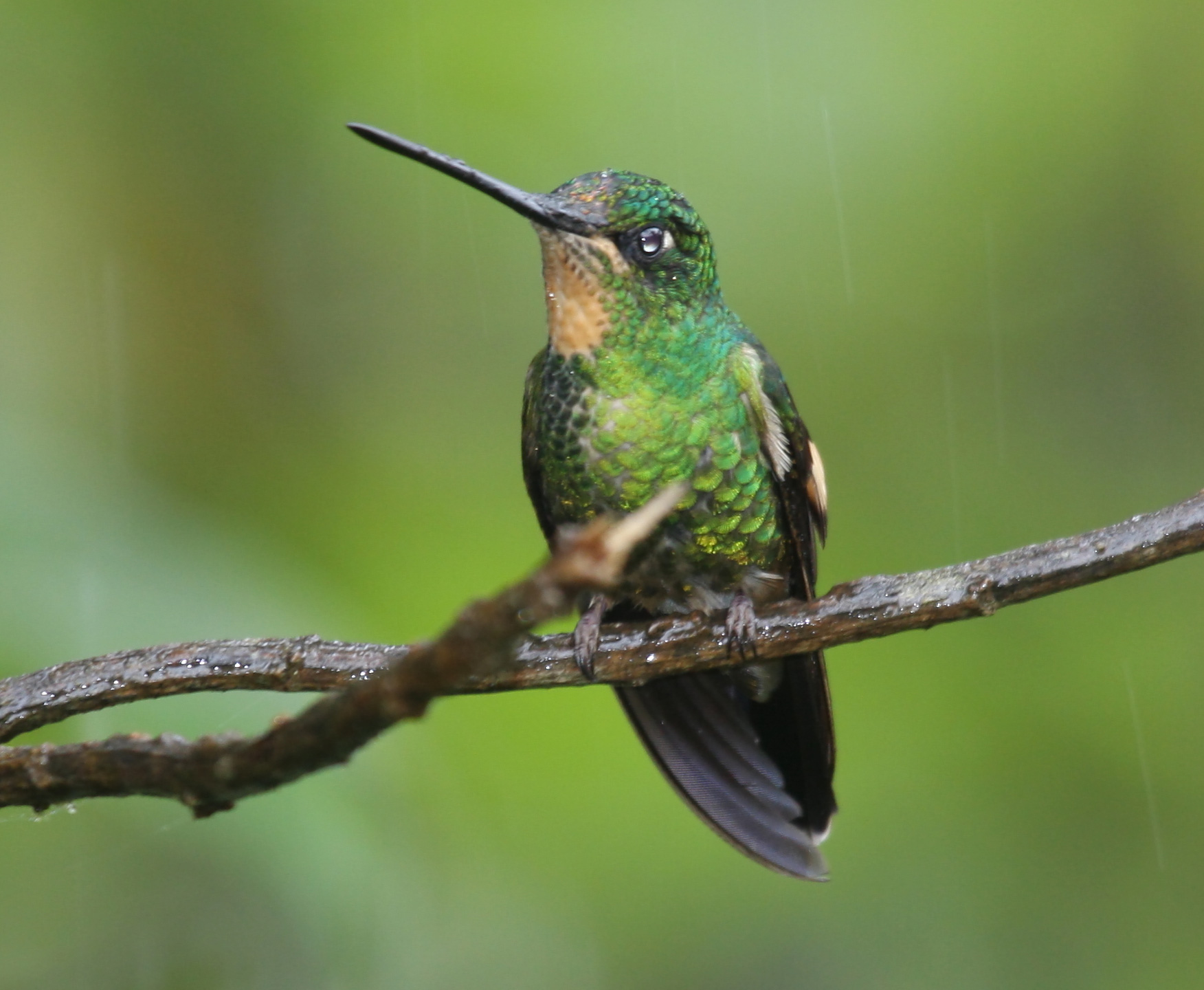
female C. l. albimaculata
Yanacocha Reserve, Ecuador

== Distribution and habitat ==
The nominate subspecies of buff-winged starfrontlet is found from the Central Andes of Colombia south through the Andes of Ecuador into far northern Peru. C. l. albimaculata is found only in northwestern Ecuador. The species inhabits cloudforest, elfin forest, and the lower edges of páramo. In elevation it ranges from 2,600 to 4,800 m (8,500 to 15,700 ft) but is most common around 3,000 m (9,800 ft).

== Behavior ==
=== Movement ===
The buff-winged starfrontlet is generally sedentary, though some movement to follow flowering plants has been noted.

=== Feeding ===
The buff-winged starfrontlet feeds on nectar by trap-lining, visiting a circuit of flowering plants, but it also will defend patches of flowers. It most often forages at low levels at the margins of forest, and often clings to flowers to feed as well as hovering. In addition to feeding on nectar it captures small arthropods by gleaning from foliage and by hawking.

=== Breeding ===
The buff-winged starfrontlet's breeding season in Colombia is August and September; it is not defined elsewhere. It builds a cup nest in a branch fork, typically about 2 to 4 m (7 to 13 ft) above ground. The female incubates the clutch of two eggs for 15 to 17 days; the time to fledging has not been determined.

=== Vocalization ===
The buff-winged starfrontlet makes a "thin, wiry chatter with rattles", often during territorial disputes. While feeding it often repeats "a characteristic, nasal 'unk'".

== Status ==
The IUCN has assessed the buff-winged starfrontlet as being of Least Concern, though its population size is not known and is believed to be decreasing. Though it has a fairly large overall range, its habitat is patchy, fragmented, and under continuing threat of deforestation. It is not thought likely to accept human-made habitats like gardens.
