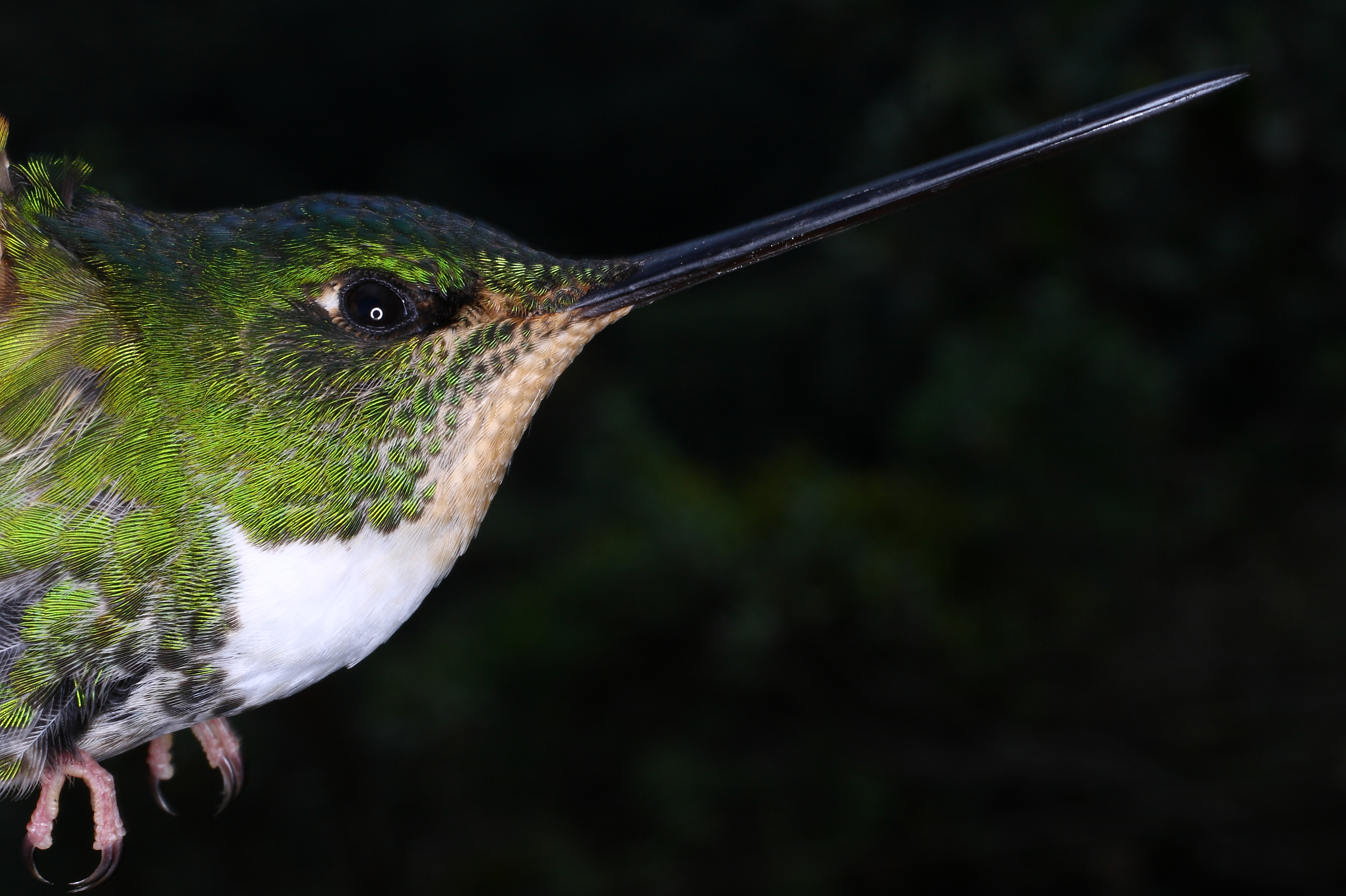
- In Mérida, Venezuela

Conservation status
- Least Concern (IUCN 3.1)
- CITES Appendix II

Scientific classification
- Kingdom: Animalia
- Phylum: Chordata
- Class: Aves
- Order: Apodiformes
- Family: Trochilidae
- Genus: Coeligena
- Species: C. conradii

Binomial name
- Coeligena conradii (Bourcier, 1847)

= Green inca =

Species of hummingbird

The green inca (Coeligena conradii) is a species of hummingbird in subfamily Lesbiinae, the so-called "typical hummingbirds", of family Trochilidae. It is found in Colombia and Venezuela.

== Taxonomy and systematics ==
The International Ornithological Committee (IOC), the Clements taxonomy, and BirdLife International's Handbook of the Birds of the World (HBW) recognize the green inca as a species. The South American Classification Committee of the American Ornithological Society treats it as a subspecies of the collared inca (C. torquata) but is seeking a proposal to recognize it as a species.

== Description ==
The green inca is about 14.5 cm (5.7 in) long; one female specimen weighed 6.7 g (0.24 oz). Adult males are mostly grass green, with a wide white collar across the upper breast. Their outer tail feathers are mostly white with green tips and their wings are brownish. Females are also mostly grass green above but with a smaller white collar and a rusty throat with green spots. The rest of their underparts are grayish with green mottling and spots.

== Distribution and habitat ==
The green inca is found in the Andes of northwestern Venezuela between the states of Trujillo and Táchira and in northern Colombia's Norte de Santander Department. It inhabits the interior and edges of humid montane cloudforest. In elevation it mostly ranges between 1,800 and 3,000 m (5,900 and 9,800 ft) but can be found as low as 1,500 m (4,900 ft).

== Behavior ==
=== Movement ===
As far as is known, the green inca is a year-round resident throughout its range.

=== Feeding ===
The green inca forages by trap-lining, visiting a circuit of flowering plants. It mostly feeds from the understory to the forest's mid-level but also sometimes in the canopy. It feeds on nectar from Cavendishia, Fuchsia, plants of family Ericaceae, and others such as vines. It also catches insects by hawking from a perch or by gleaning while hovering.

=== Breeding ===
Nothing is known about the green inca's breeding biology.

=== Vocalization ===
The green inca's most common vocalization is "a squeaky chatter". It also makes "a soft, low, reedy whistle "tu-tee", "a longer series...pip..pip..pip...", "a repeated phrase such as tsi-tsi-tsiririt...tsi-tsi-tsiririt...", and while foraging a "short spit or tsit".

== Status ==
The IUCN has assessed the green inca as being of Least Concern. It has a restricted range and its population size is not known and is believed to be decreasing. No immediate threats have been identified.
