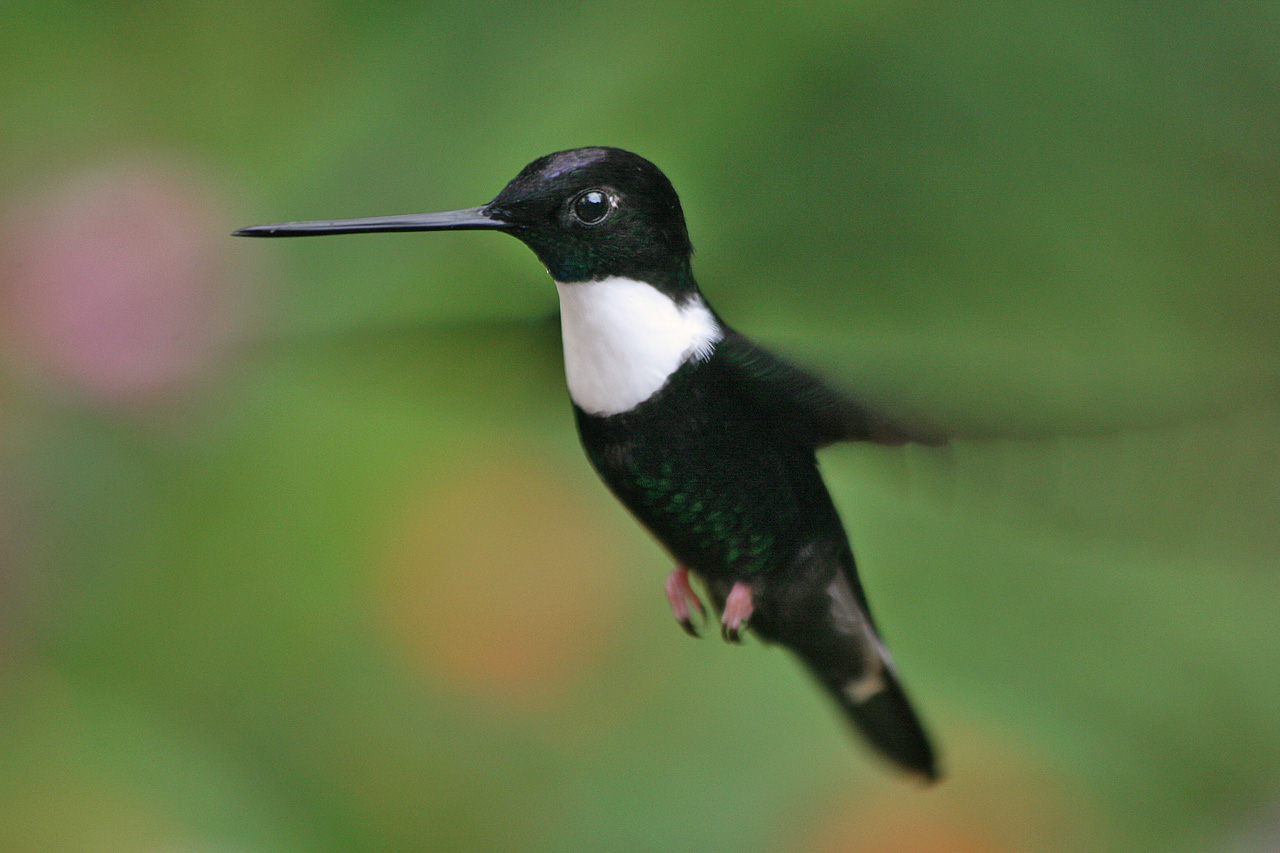
- Collared inca (C. torquata)

Scientific classification
- Kingdom: Animalia
- Phylum: Chordata
- Class: Aves
- Order: Apodiformes
- Family: Trochilidae
- Tribe: Heliantheini
- Genus: Coeligena; Lesson, 1833

Type species
- Ornismya coeligena Lesson, 1833

Species
- see text

= Coeligena =

Genus of birds

Coeligena is a genus of South American hummingbirds. Species in the genus are commonly called incas or starfrontlets.

== Taxonomy ==
The genus Coeligena was introduced in 1833 by the French naturalist René Lesson with the type species by tautonymy as Ornismya coelinga Lesson, the bronzy inca. The genus name is from Latin coeligenus meaning "heaven-born" or "celestial".

== Species ==
The genus contains the following 15 species:

Image	Common name	Scientific name	Distribution
	Bronzy inca	Coeligena coeligena	North Venezuela to southeast Bolivia
	Brown inca	Coeligena wilsoni	West Colombia to west Ecuador
	Black inca	Coeligena prunellei	North-central Colombia
	Green inca	Coeligena conradii	Northeast Colombia and northwest Venezuela (Trujillo to north Táchira)
	Collared inca	Coeligena torquata	Northwest Venezuela and Colombia to south Peru
	Gould's inca	Coeligena inca	Southeast Peru to Bolivia
	Violet-throated starfrontlet	Coeligena violifer	North Peru to northwest Bolivia
	Rainbow starfrontlet	Coeligena iris	Ecuador and Peru
	White-tailed starfrontlet	Coeligena phalerata	Northeast Colombia
	Dusky starfrontlet	Coeligena orina	North-central Colombia
	Buff-winged starfrontlet	Coeligena lutetiae	Colombia to Peru
	Perija starfrontlet	Coeligena consita	Perijá Mountains (Colombia-Venezuela border)
	Golden-bellied starfrontlet	Coeligena bonapartei	East Colombia
	Golden-tailed starfrontlet	Coeligena eos	West Venezuela
	Blue-throated starfrontlet	Coeligena helianthea	Northeast Colombia and west Venezuela
