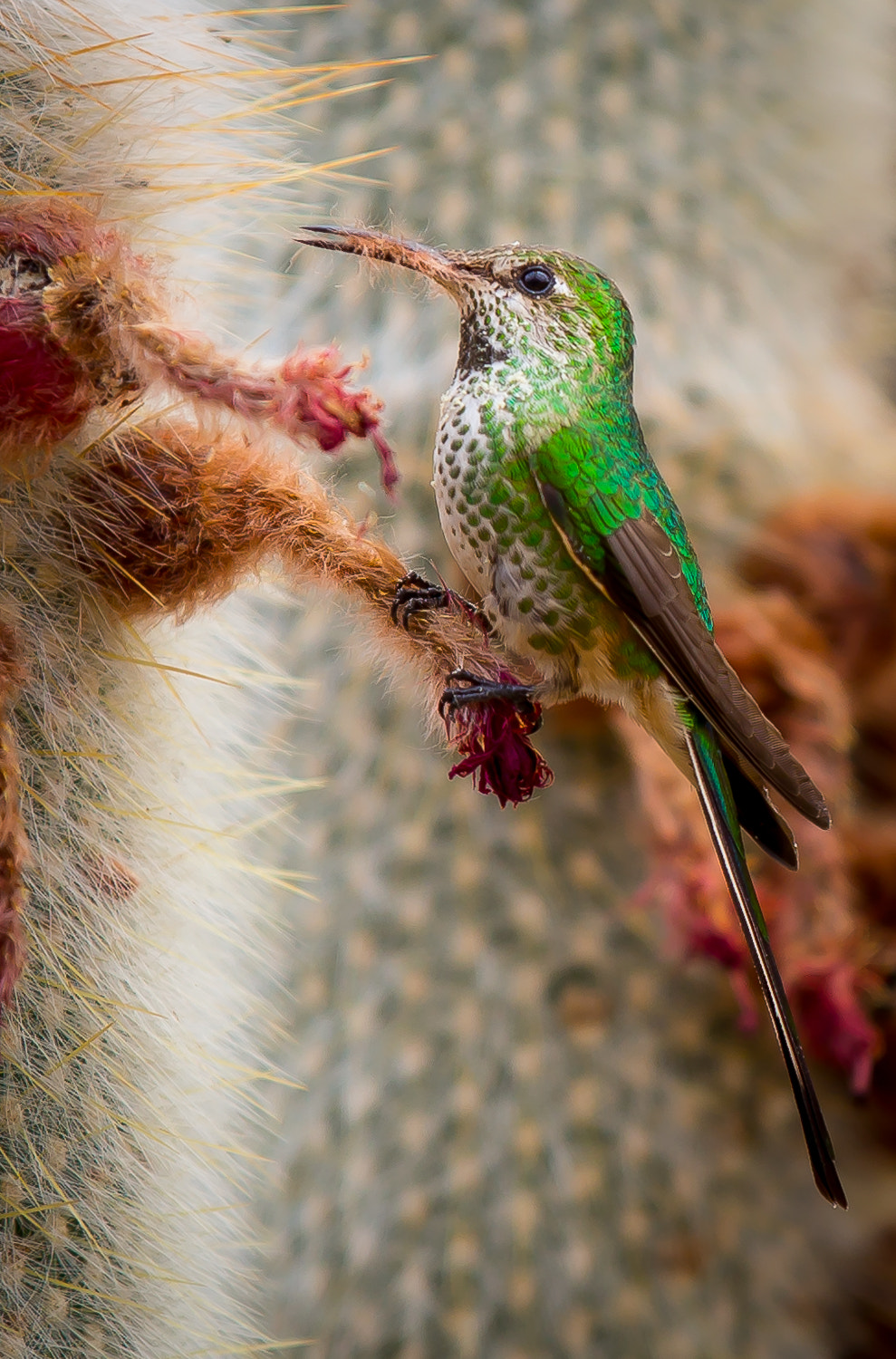
- Female black-tailed trainbearer (Lesbia victoriae)

Scientific classification
- Kingdom: Animalia
- Phylum: Chordata
- Class: Aves
- Order: Apodiformes
- Family: Trochilidae
- Subfamily: Lesbiinae; Reichenbach, 1854

Tribes
- 2, see text

= Lesbiinae =

Subfamily of birds

Lesbiinae is one of the six subfamilies that make up the hummingbird family Trochilidae.

The subfamily is divided into two tribes: Heliantheini ("brilliants") containing 14 genera and Lesbiini ("coquettes") containing 18 genera.

== Phylogeny ==
A molecular phylogenetic study of the hummingbirds published in 2007 found that the family consisted of nine clades. When Edward Dickinson and James Van Remsen, Jr. updated the Howard and Moore Complete Checklist of the Birds of the World for the 4th edition in 2013 they divided the hummingbird family into six subfamilies and proposed using the name Lesbiinae for a subfamily containing the tribes Heliantheini and Lesbiini. The subfamily Lesbiinae had been introduced by Ludwig Reichenbach in 1854.

Molecular phylogenetic studies by Jimmy McGuire and collaborators published between 2007 and 2014 determined the relationships between the major groups of hummingbirds. In the cladogram below the English names are those introduced in 1997. The Latin names are those proposed by Dickinson and Remsen in 2013.

- Trochilidae
  - - Florisuginae – topazes
    - Phaethornithinae – hermits
  - - Polytminae – mangoes
    - - Lesbiinae
        - Heliantheini – brilliants
        - Lesbiini – coquettes
      - - Patagoninae – giant hummingbird
        - Trochilinae
          - Trochilini – emeralds
          - - Lampornithini – mountain gems
            - Mellisugini – bees

== Sources ==
- Dickinson, E.C.; Remsen, J.V. Jr., eds. (2013). The Howard & Moore Complete Checklist of the Birds of the World. Vol. 1: Non-passerines (4th ed.). Eastbourne, UK: Aves Press. ISBN 978-0-9568611-0-8.
