= List of hummingbirds =

The International Ornithological Committee (IOC) recognizes these 366 hummingbird species in family Trochilidae, and distributes them among 112 genera. One extinct species known only from a 19th century specimen, Brace's emerald (Riccordia bracei), is included. This list is presented in IOC taxonomic sequence and is also sortable alphabetically by common name and binomial name.

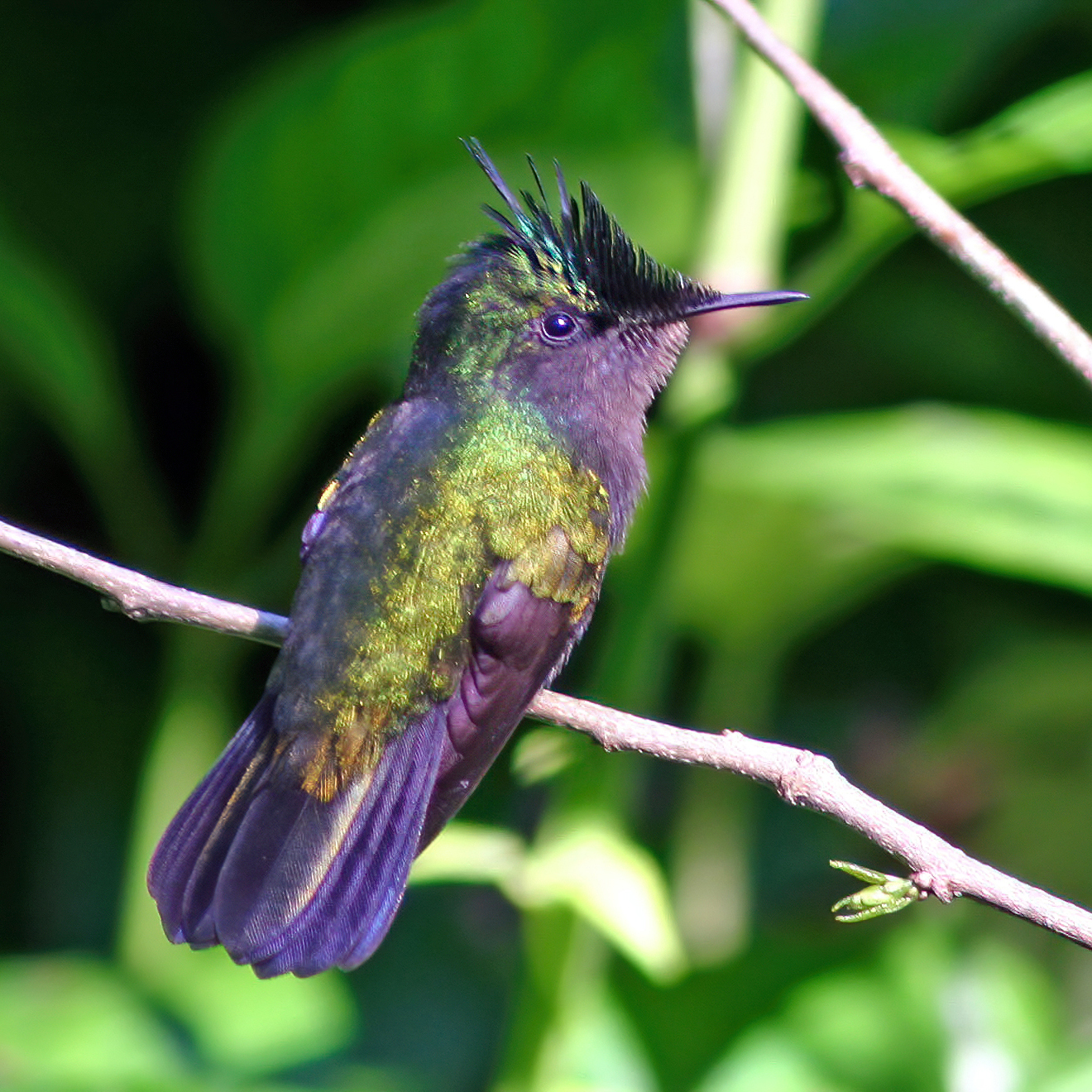
Antillean crested hummingbird Orthorhyncus cristatus

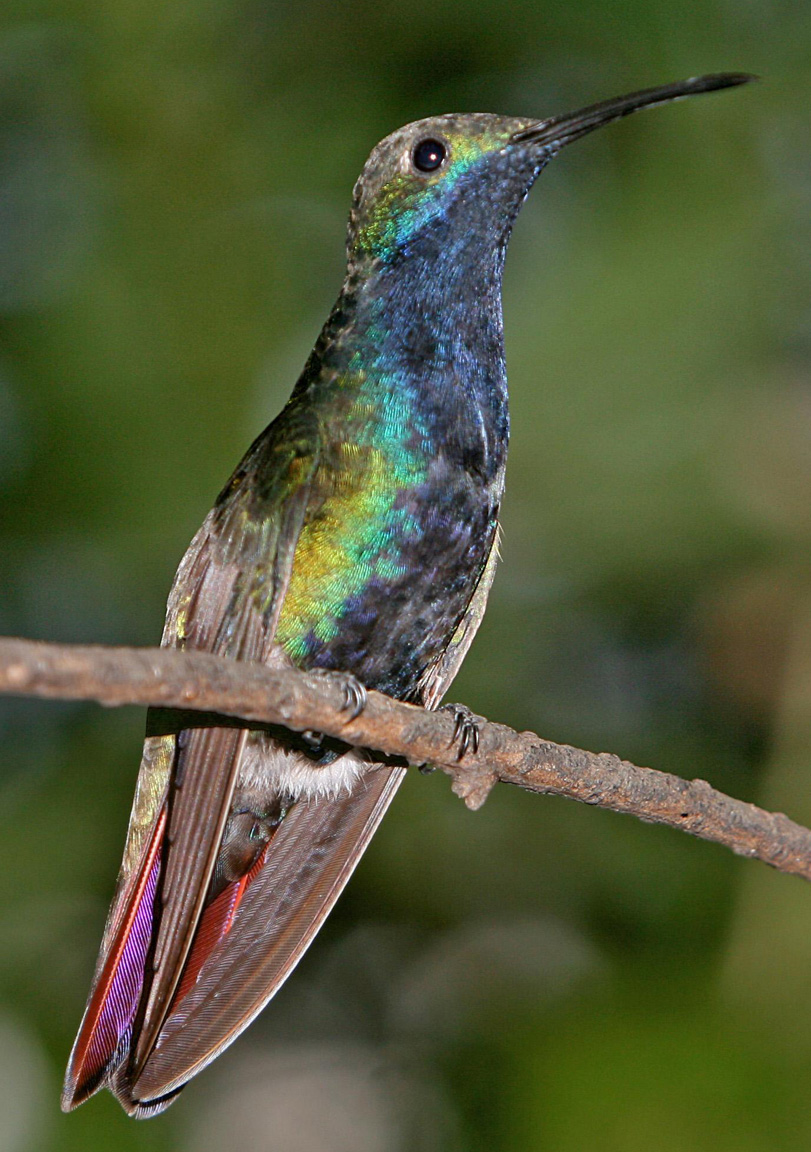
Black-throated mango Anthracothorax nigricollis

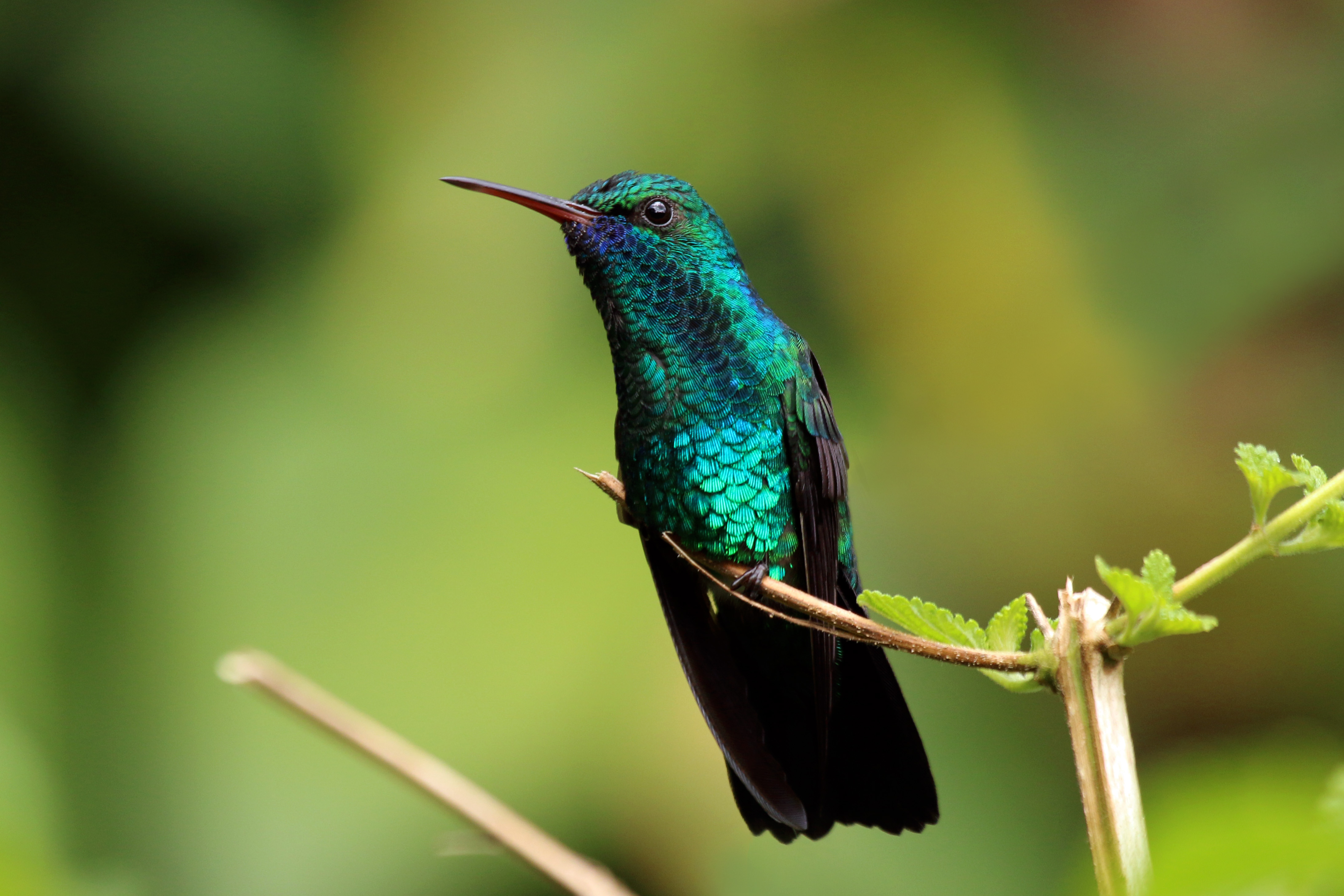
Blue-chinned sapphire Chlorestes notata

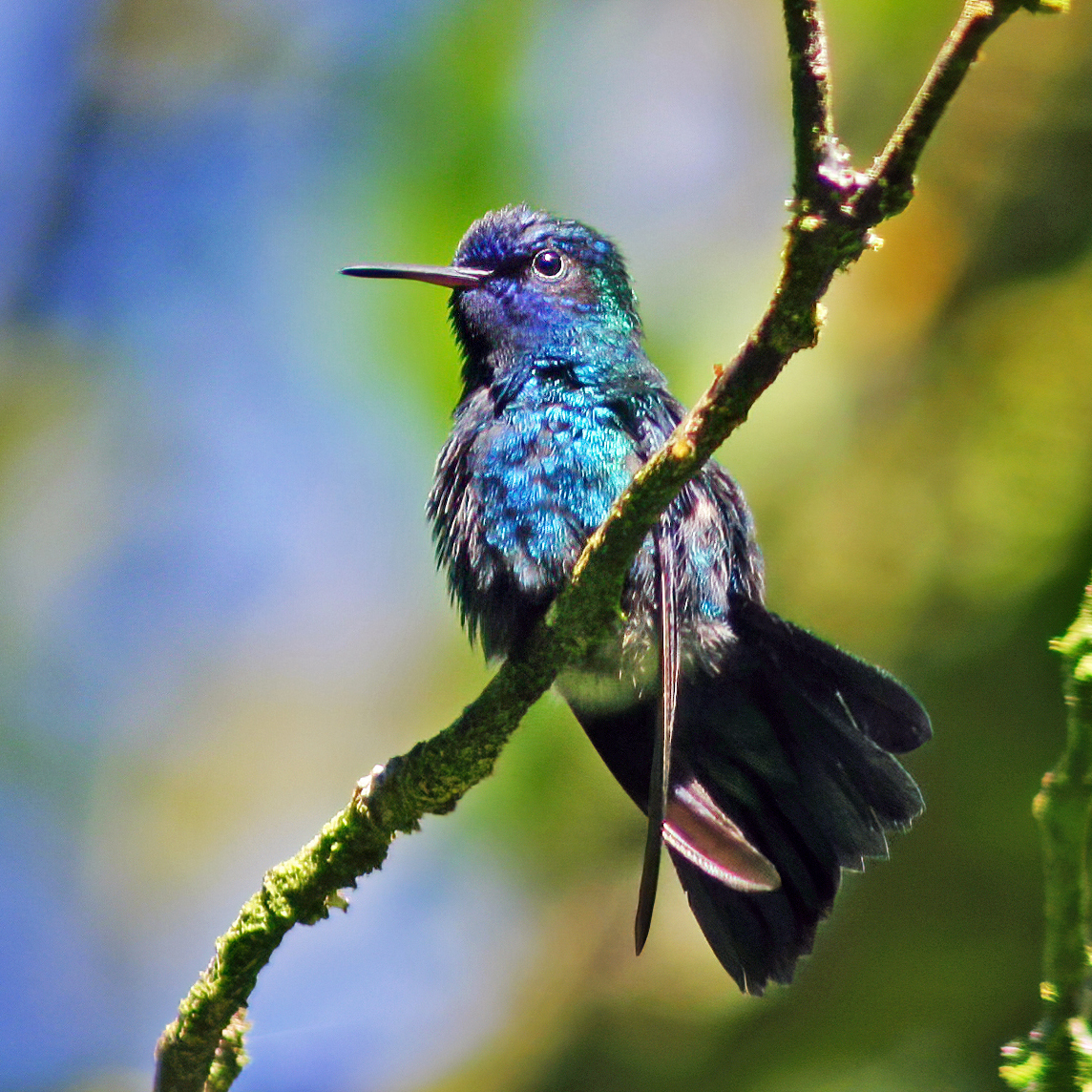
Blue-headed hummingbird Riccordia bicolor

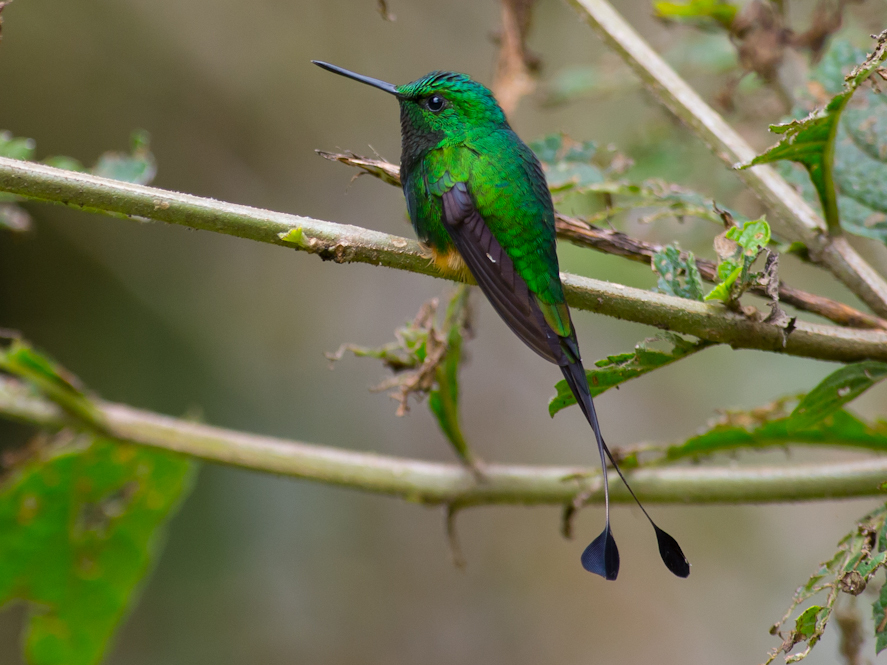
Rufous-booted racket-tail Ocreatus addae

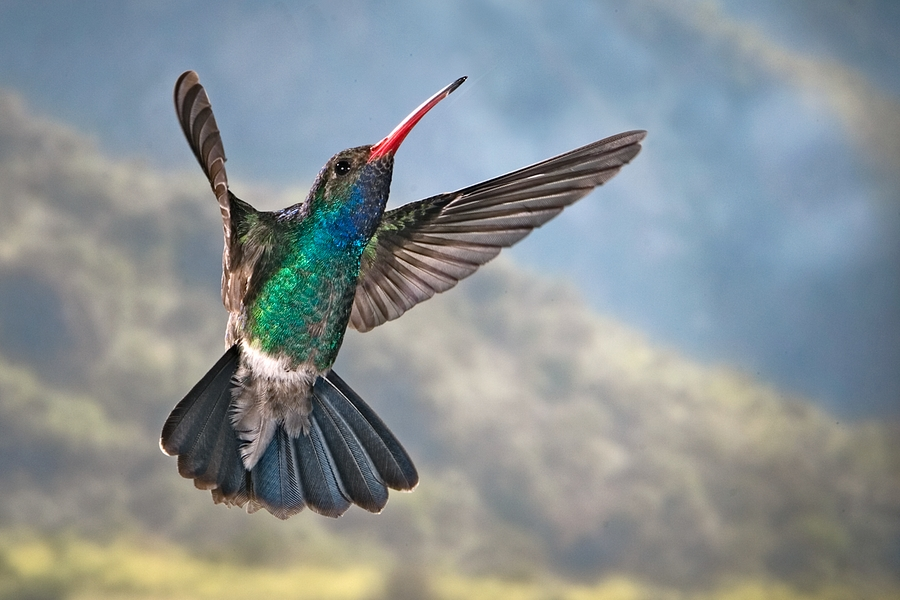
Broad-billed hummingbird Cynanthus latirostris

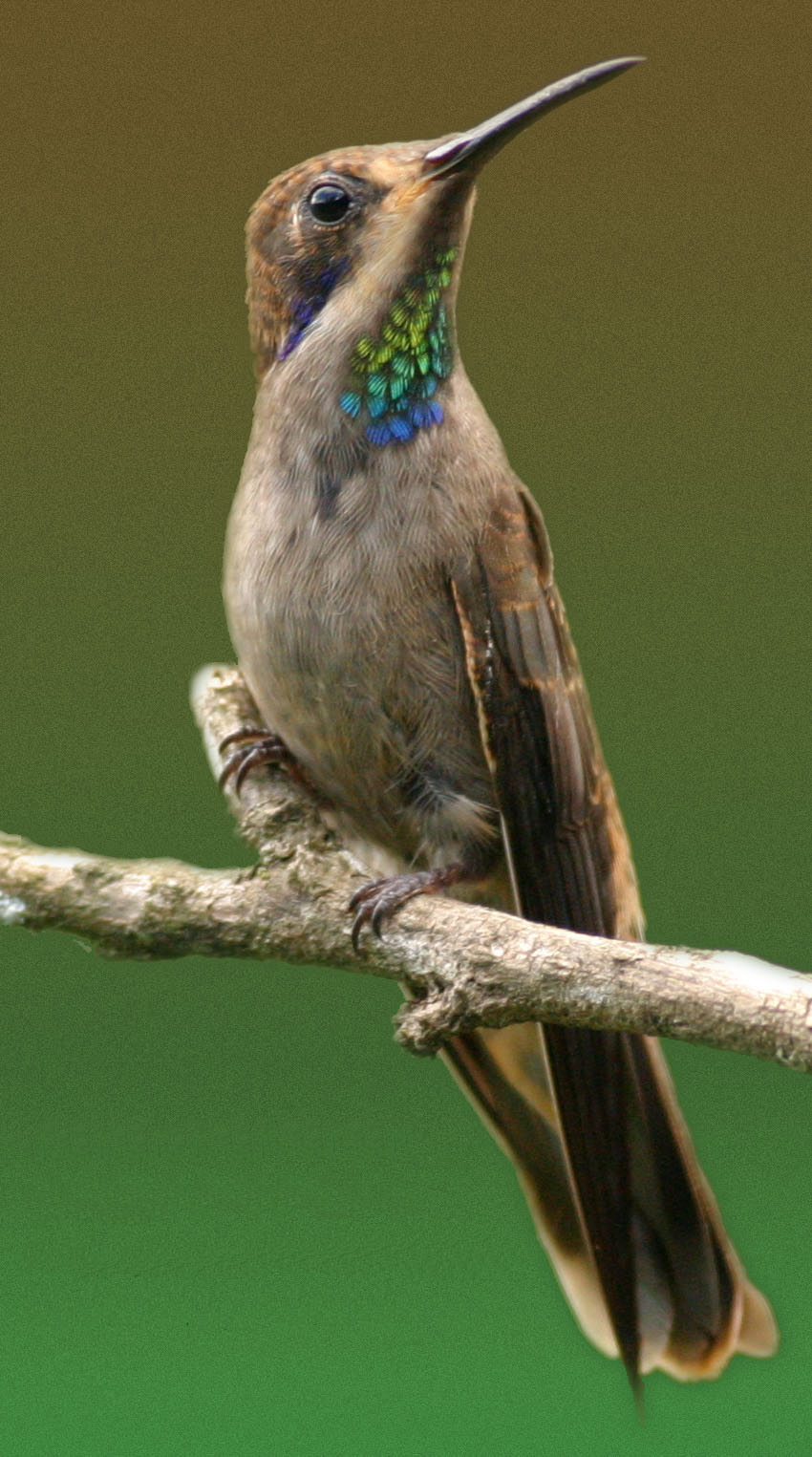
Brown violetear Colibri delphinae

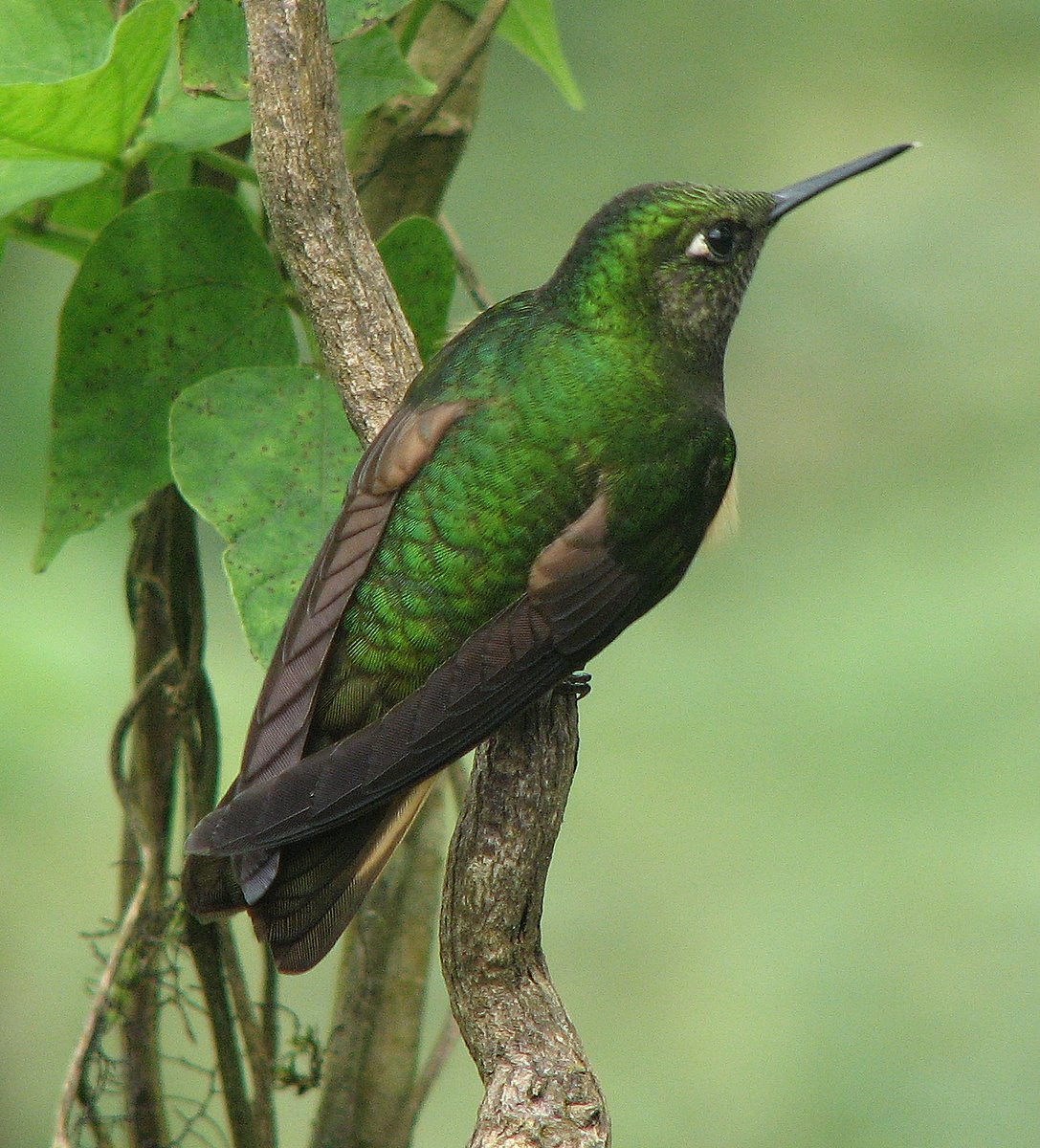
Buff-tailed coronet Boissonneaua flavescens

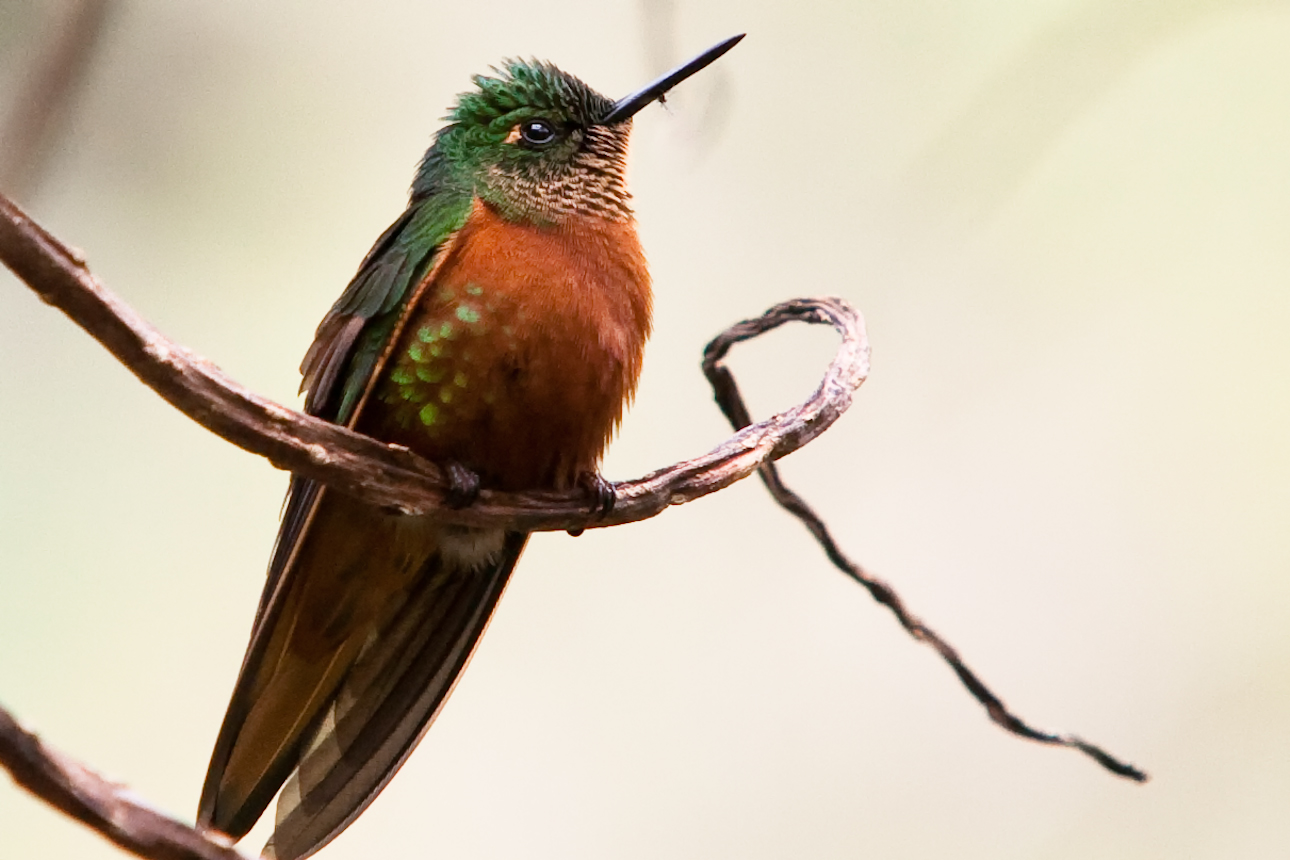
Chestnut-breasted coronet Boissonneaua matthewsii

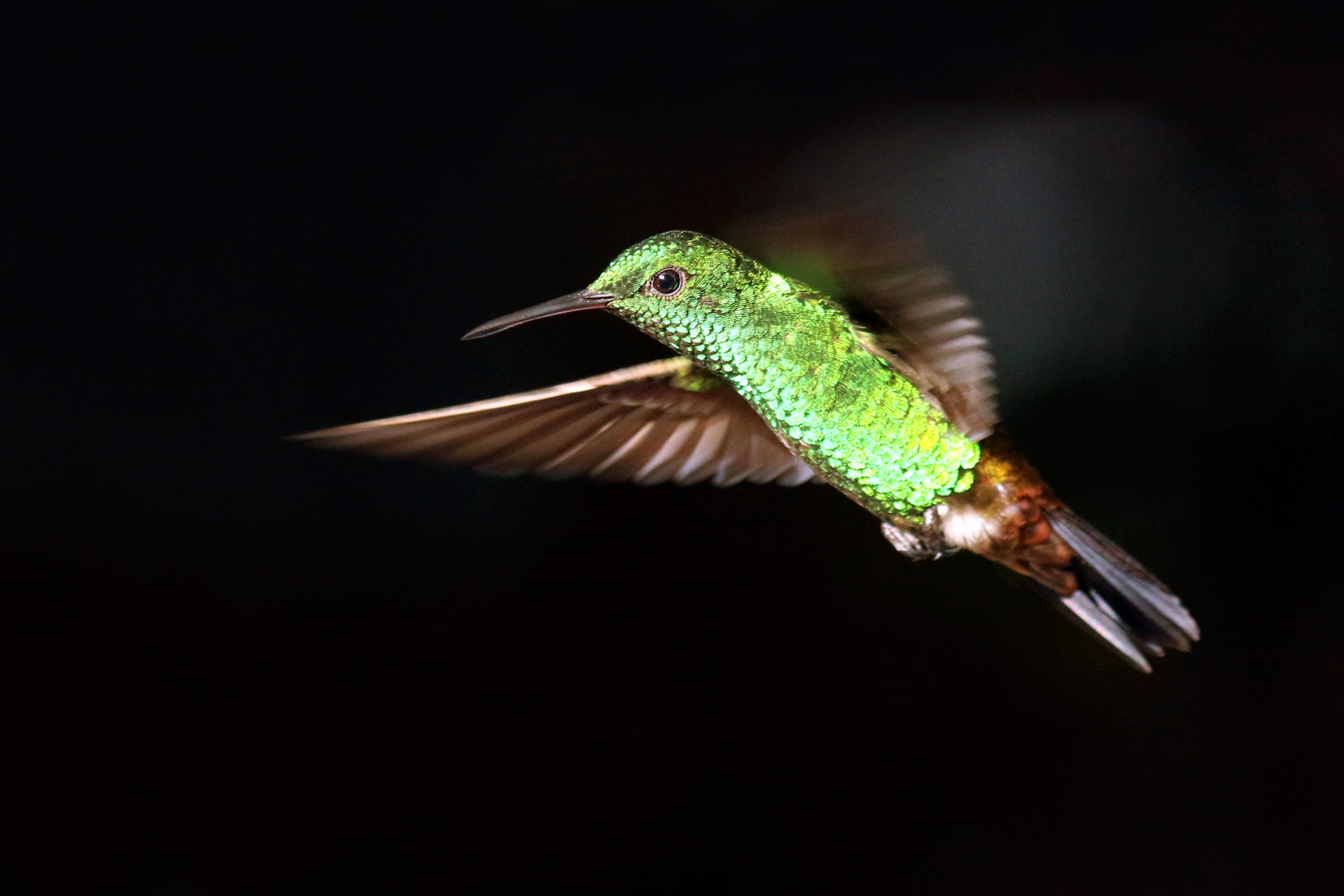
Copper-rumped hummingbird Amazilia tobaci

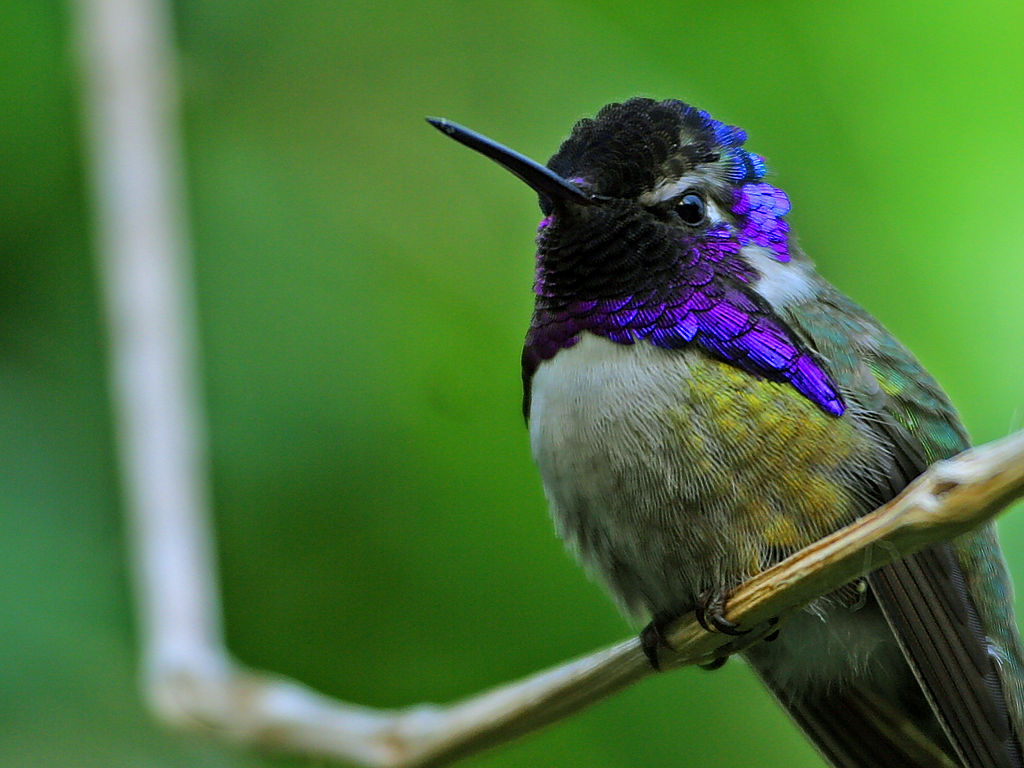
Costa's hummingbird Calypte costae

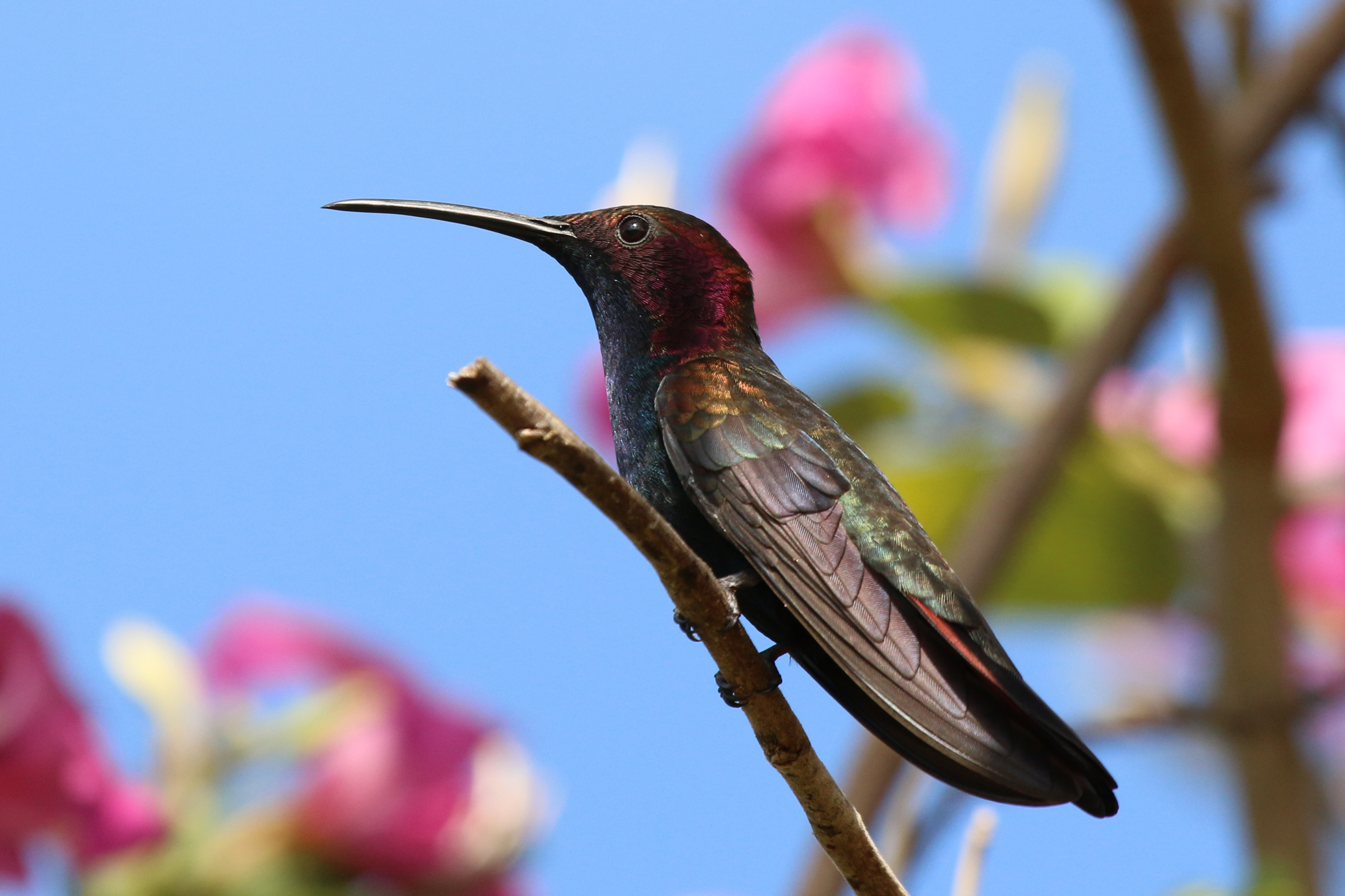
Jamaican mango Anthracothorax mango

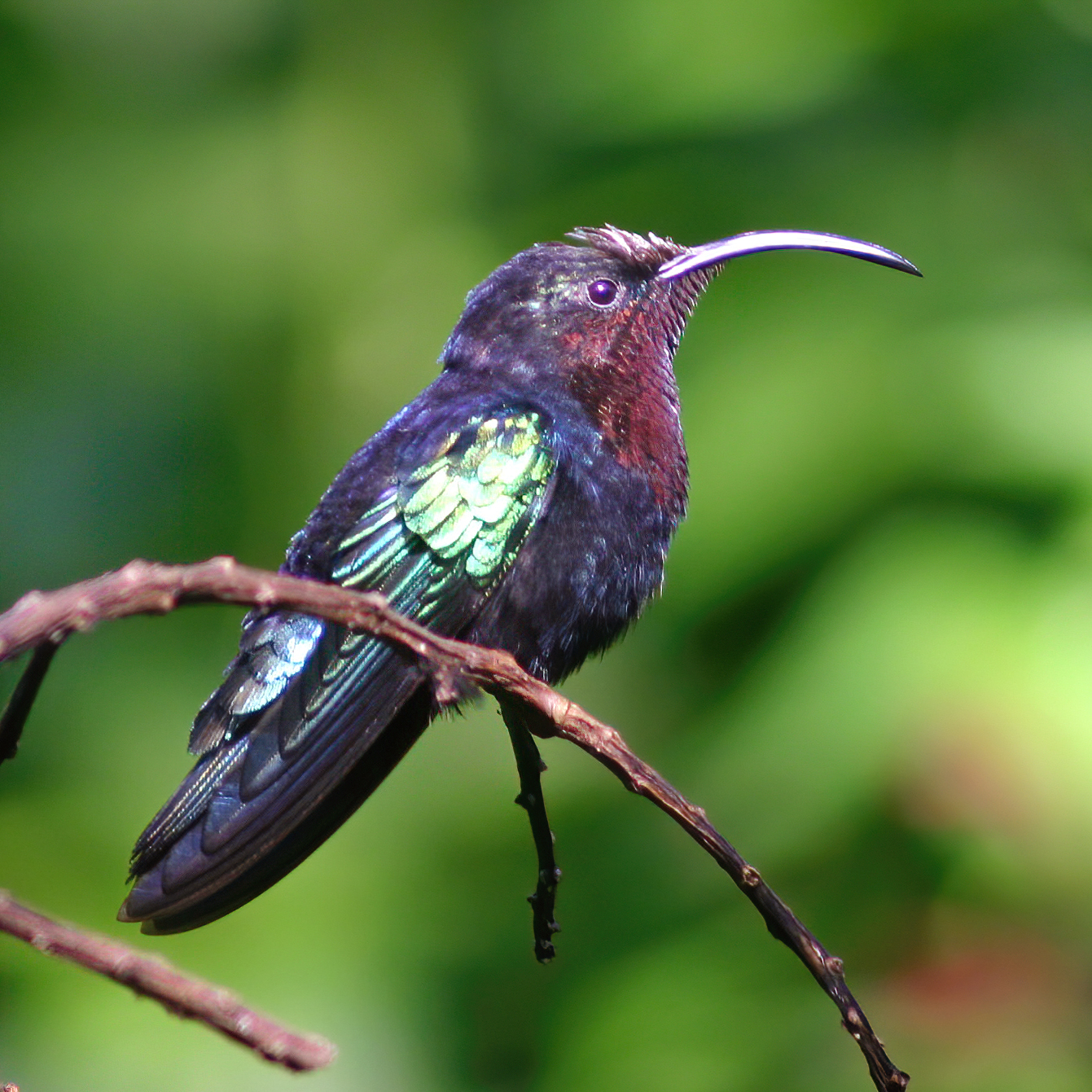
Purple-throated carib Eulampis jugularis

Red-billed streamertail Trochilus polytmus

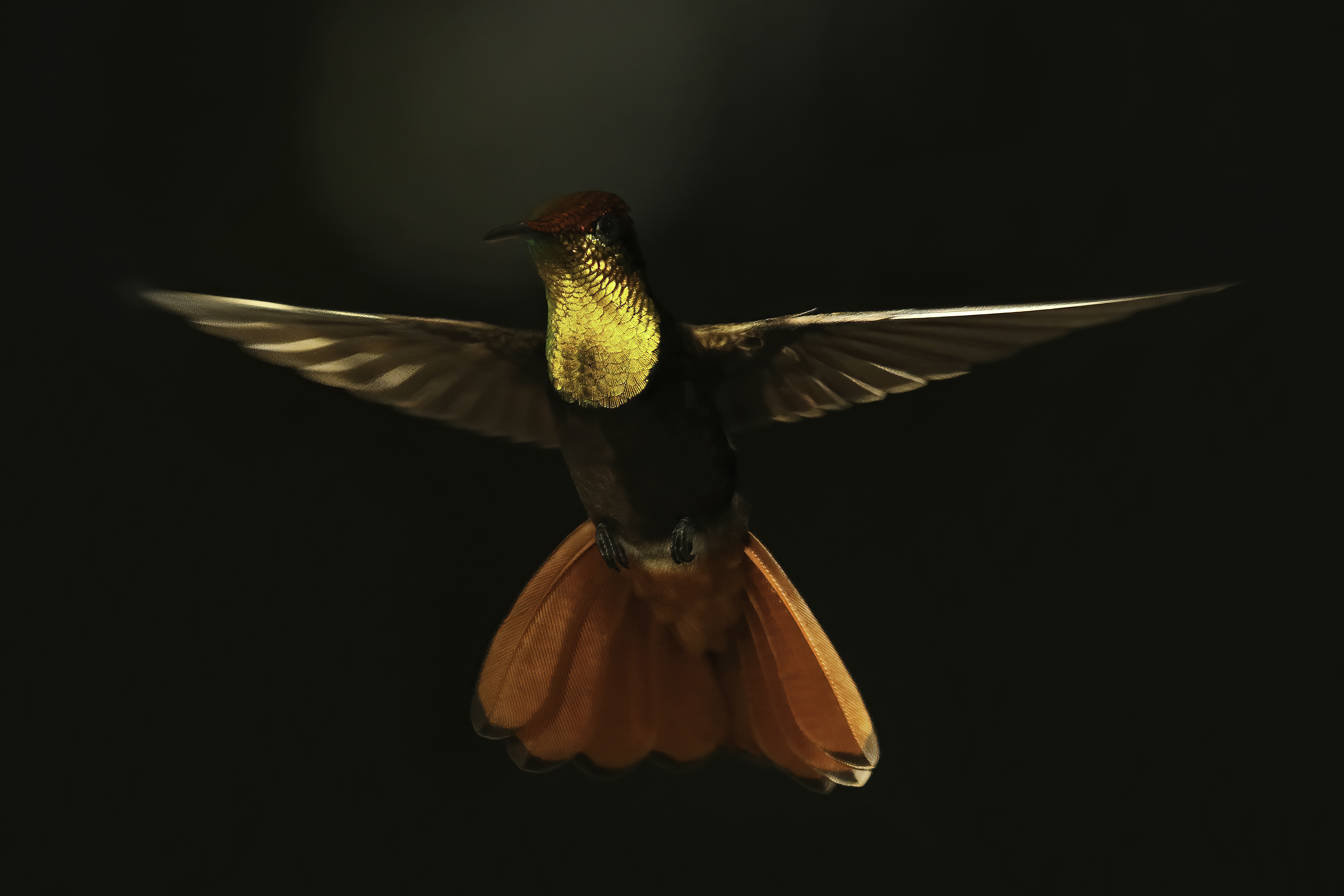
Ruby-topaz hummingbird Chrysolampis mosquitus

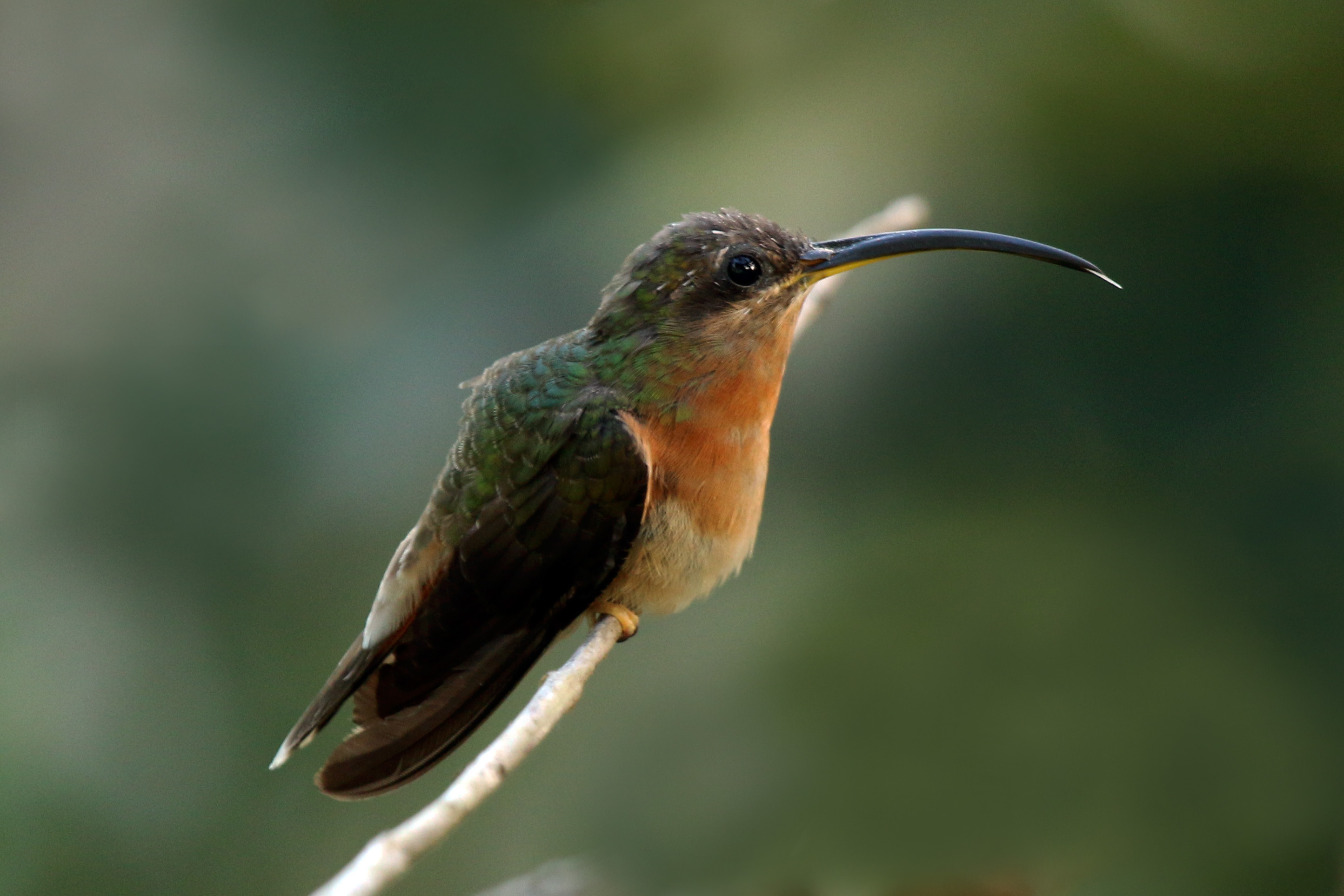
Rufous-breasted hermit Glaucis hirsutus

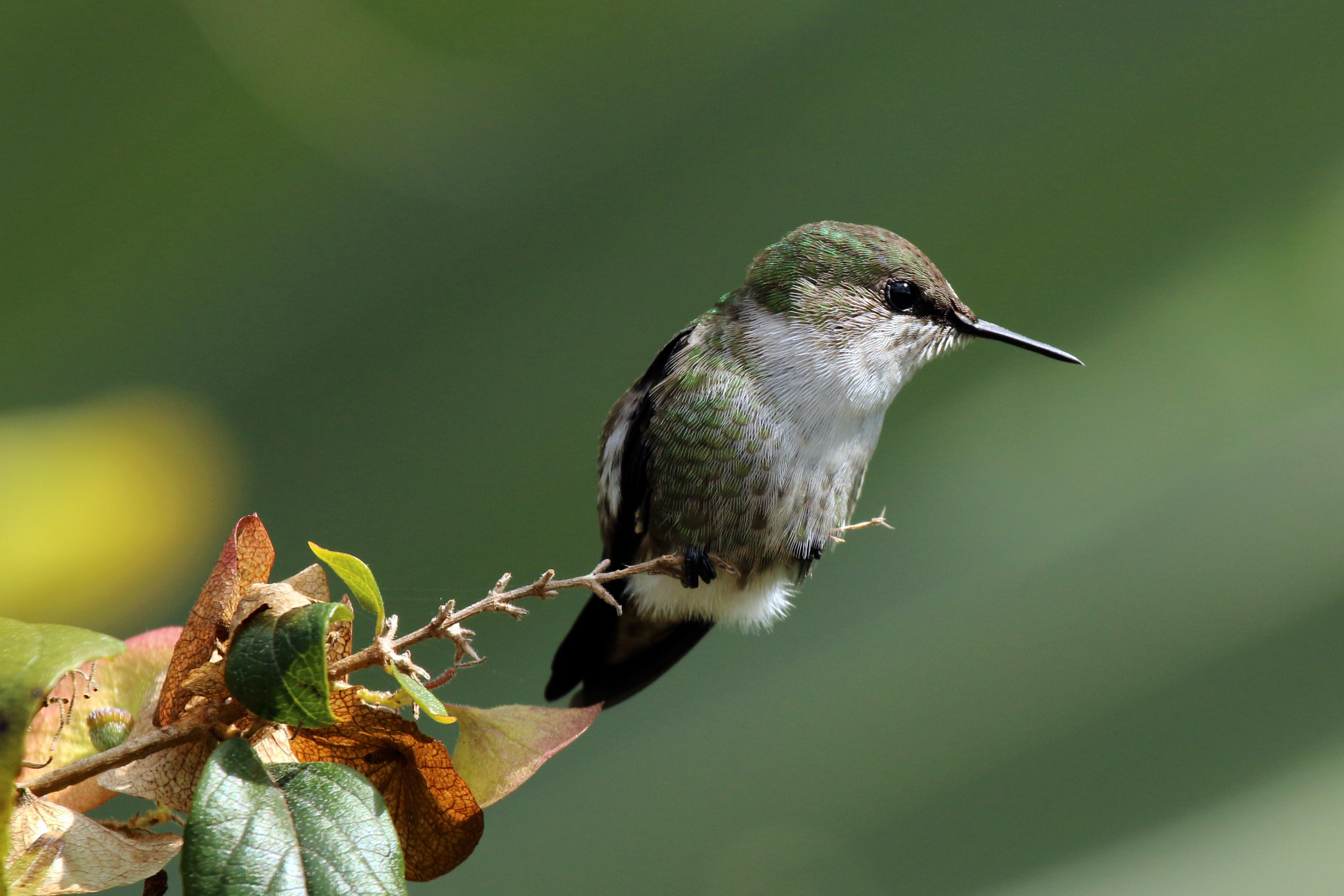
Vervain hummingbird Mellisuga minima

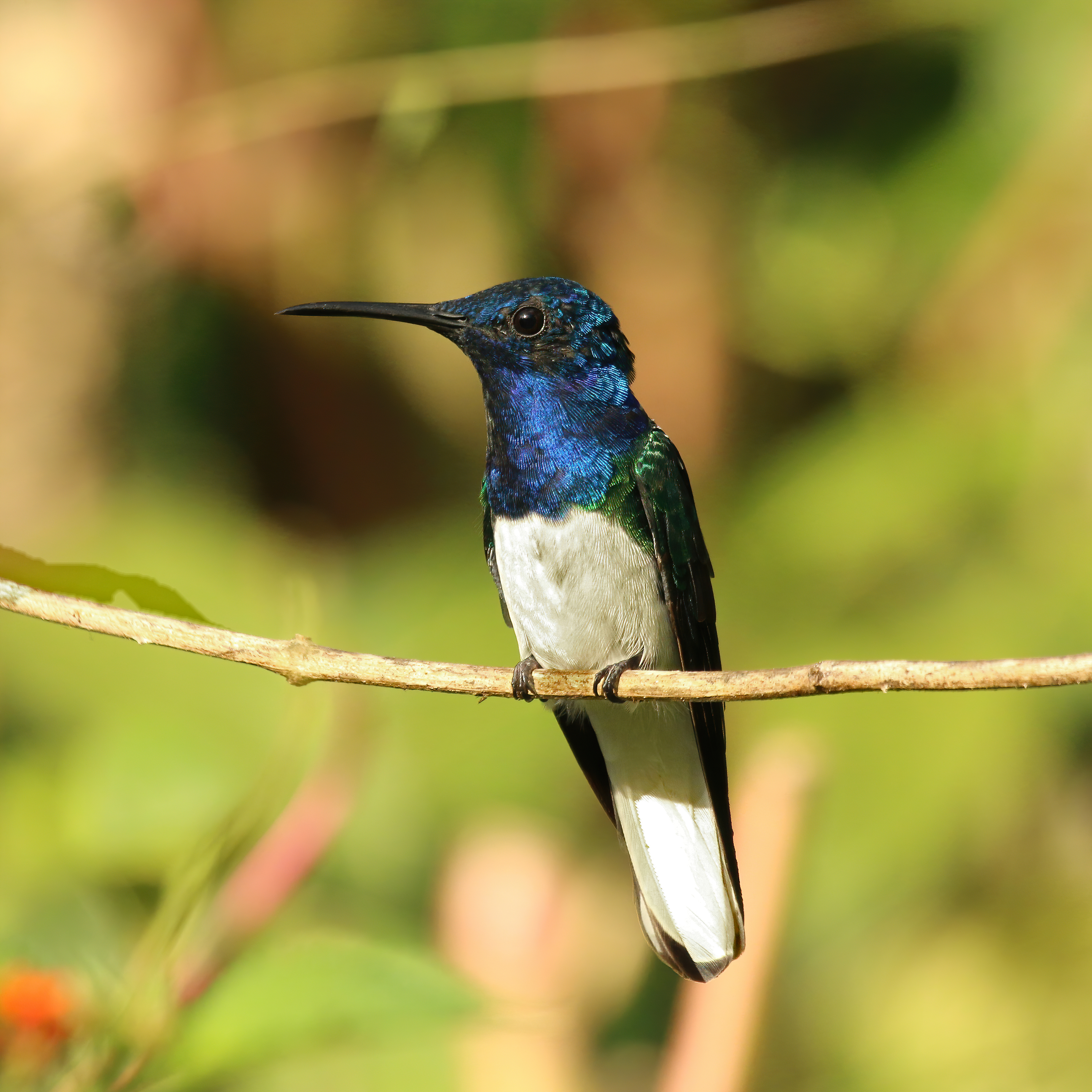
White-necked jacobin Florisuga mellivora

Common name	Binomial name + authority	IOC sequence
Crimson topaz	Topaza pella (Linnaeus, 1758)	1
Fiery topaz	Topaza pyra (Gould, 1846)	2
White-necked jacobin	Florisuga mellivora (Linnaeus, 1758)	3
Black jacobin	Florisuga fusca (Vieillot, 1817)	4
White-tipped sicklebill	Eutoxeres aquila (Bourcier, 1847)	5
Buff-tailed sicklebill	Eutoxeres condamini (Bourcier, 1851)	6
Saw-billed hermit	Ramphodon naevius (Dumont, 1818)	7
Hook-billed hermit	Glaucis dohrnii (Bourcier & Mulsant, 1852)	8
Bronzy hermit	Glaucis aeneus Lawrence, 1868	9
Rufous-breasted hermit	Glaucis hirsutus (Gmelin, JF, 1788)	10
Band-tailed barbthroat	Threnetes ruckeri (Bourcier, 1847)	11
Pale-tailed barbthroat	Threnetes leucurus (Linnaeus, 1766)	12
Sooty barbthroat	Threnetes niger (Linnaeus, 1758)	13
Broad-tipped hermit	Anopetia gounellei (Boucard, 1891)	14
Dusky-throated hermit	Phaethornis squalidus (Temminck, 1822)	15
Streak-throated hermit	Phaethornis rupurumii Boucard, 1892	16
Little hermit	Phaethornis longuemareus (Lesson, RP, 1832)	17
Tapajos hermit	Phaethornis aethopygus Zimmer, JT, 1950	18
Minute hermit	Phaethornis idaliae (Bourcier & Mulsant, 1856)	19
Cinnamon-throated hermit	Phaethornis nattereri Berlepsch, 1887	20
Black-throated hermit	Phaethornis atrimentalis Lawrence, 1858	21
Stripe-throated hermit	Phaethornis striigularis Gould, 1854	22
Grey-chinned hermit	Phaethornis griseogularis Gould, 1851	23
Reddish hermit	Phaethornis ruber (Linnaeus, 1758)	24
White-browed hermit	Phaethornis stuarti Hartert, EJO, 1897	25
Buff-bellied hermit	Phaethornis subochraceus Todd, 1915	26
Sooty-capped hermit	Phaethornis augusti (Bourcier, 1847)	27
Planalto hermit	Phaethornis pretrei (Lesson, RP & Delattre, 1839)	28
Scale-throated hermit	Phaethornis eurynome (Lesson, RP, 1832)	29
Pale-bellied hermit	Phaethornis anthophilus (Bourcier, 1843)	30
White-bearded hermit	Phaethornis hispidus (Gould, 1846)	31
White-whiskered hermit	Phaethornis yaruqui (Bourcier, 1851)	32
Green hermit	Phaethornis guy (Lesson, RP, 1833)	33
Tawny-bellied hermit	Phaethornis syrmatophorus Gould, 1852	34
Koepcke's hermit	Phaethornis koepckeae Weske & Terborgh, 1977	35
Needle-billed hermit	Phaethornis philippii (Bourcier, 1847)	36
Straight-billed hermit	Phaethornis bourcieri (Lesson, RP, 1832)	37
Mexican hermit	Phaethornis mexicanus Hartert, EJO, 1897	38
Long-billed hermit	Phaethornis longirostris (Delattre, 1843)	39
Long-tailed hermit	Phaethornis superciliosus (Linnaeus, 1766)	40
Great-billed hermit	Phaethornis malaris (Nordmann, 1835)	41
Green-fronted lancebill	Doryfera ludovicae (Bourcier & Mulsant, 1847)	42
Blue-fronted lancebill	Doryfera johannae (Bourcier, 1847)	43
White-throated daggerbill	Schistes albogularis Gould, 1852	44
Geoffroy's daggerbill	Schistes geoffroyi (Bourcier, 1843)	45
Hyacinth visorbearer	Augastes scutatus (Temminck, 1824)	46
Hooded visorbearer	Augastes lumachella (Lesson, RP, 1839)	47
Brown violetear	Colibri delphinae (Lesson, RP, 1839)	48
Mexican violetear	Colibri thalassinus (Swainson, 1827)	49
Lesser violetear	Colibri cyanotus (Bourcier, 1843)	50
Sparkling violetear	Colibri coruscans (Gould, 1846)	51
White-vented violetear	Colibri serrirostris (Vieillot, 1816)	52
Tooth-billed hummingbird	Androdon aequatorialis Gould, 1863	53
Horned sungem	Heliactin bilophus (Temminck, 1820)	54
Purple-crowned fairy	Heliothryx barroti (Bourcier, 1843)	55
Black-eared fairy	Heliothryx auritus (Gmelin, JF, 1788)	56
White-tailed goldenthroat	Polytmus guainumbi (Pallas, 1764)	57
Tepui goldenthroat	Polytmus milleri (Chapman, 1929)	58
Green-tailed goldenthroat	Polytmus theresiae (Silva Maia, 1843)	59
Fiery-tailed awlbill	Avocettula recurvirostris (Swainson, 1822)	60
Ruby-topaz hummingbird	Chrysolampis mosquitus (Linnaeus, 1758)	61
Jamaican mango	Anthracothorax mango (Linnaeus, 1758)	62
Green-throated mango	Anthracothorax viridigula (Boddaert, 1783)	63
Green-breasted mango	Anthracothorax prevostii (Lesson, RP, 1832)	64
Veraguan mango	Anthracothorax veraguensis Reichenbach, 1855	65
Black-throated mango	Anthracothorax nigricollis (Vieillot, 1817)	66
Hispaniolan mango	Anthracothorax dominicus (Linnaeus, 1766)	67
Puerto Rican mango	Anthracothorax aurulentus (Audebert & Vieillot, 1801)	68
Green mango	Anthracothorax viridis (Audebert & Vieillot, 1801)	69
Green-throated carib	Eulampis holosericeus (Linnaeus, 1758)	70
Purple-throated carib	Eulampis jugularis (Linnaeus, 1766)	71
Orange-throated sunangel	Heliangelus mavors Gould, 1848	72
Amethyst-throated sunangel	Heliangelus amethysticollis (d'Orbigny & Lafresnaye, 1838)	73
Longuemare's sunangel	Heliangelus clarisse (Longuemare, 1841)	74
Merida sunangel	Heliangelus spencei (Bourcier, 1847)	75
Gorgeted sunangel	Heliangelus strophianus (Gould, 1846)	76
Tourmaline sunangel	Heliangelus exortis (Fraser, 1840)	77
Flame-throated sunangel	Heliangelus micraster Gould, 1872	78
Purple-throated sunangel	Heliangelus viola Gould, 1853	79
Royal sunangel	Heliangelus regalis Fitzpatrick, Willard & Terborgh, 1979	80
Green-backed firecrown	Sephanoides sephaniodes (Lesson, RP & Garnot, 1827)	81
Juan Fernandez firecrown	Sephanoides fernandensis (King, PP, 1831)	82
Green thorntail	Discosura conversii (Bourcier & Mulsant, 1846)	83
Wire-crested thorntail	Discosura popelairii (Du Bus de Gisignies, 1846)	84
Black-bellied thorntail	Discosura langsdorffi (Temminck, 1821)	85
Letitia's thorntail	Discosura letitiae (Bourcier & Mulsant, 1852)	86
Racket-tipped thorntail	Discosura longicaudus (Gmelin, JF, 1788)	87
Tufted coquette	Lophornis ornatus (Boddaert, 1783)	88
Dot-eared coquette	Lophornis gouldii (Lesson, RP, 1832)	89
Frilled coquette	Lophornis magnificus (Vieillot, 1817)	90
Short-crested coquette	Lophornis brachylophus Moore, RT, 1949	91
Rufous-crested coquette	Lophornis delattrei (Lesson, RP, 1839)	92
Spangled coquette	Lophornis stictolophus Salvin & Elliot, DG, 1873	93
Festive coquette	Lophornis chalybeus (Temminck, 1821)	94
Butterfly coquette	Lophornis verreauxii Bourcier, 1853	95
Peacock coquette	Lophornis pavoninus Salvin & Godman, 1882	96
Black-crested coquette	Lophornis helenae (Delattre, 1843)	97
White-crested coquette	Lophornis adorabilis Salvin, 1870	98
Ecuadorian piedtail	Phlogophilus hemileucurus Gould, 1860	99
Peruvian piedtail	Phlogophilus harterti Berlepsch & Stolzmann, 1901	100
Speckled hummingbird	Adelomyia melanogenys (Fraser, 1840)	101
Long-tailed sylph	Aglaiocercus kingii (Lesson, RP, 1832)	102
Violet-tailed sylph	Aglaiocercus coelestis (Gould, 1861)	103
Venezuelan sylph	Aglaiocercus berlepschi (Hartert, EJO, 1898)	104
Red-tailed comet	Sappho sparganurus (Shaw, 1812)	105
Bronze-tailed comet	Polyonymus caroli (Bourcier, 1847)	106
Grey-bellied comet	Taphrolesbia griseiventris (Taczanowski, 1883)	107
Andean hillstar	Oreotrochilus estella (d'Orbigny, 1838)	108
White-sided hillstar	Oreotrochilus leucopleurus Gould, 1847	109
Ecuadorian hillstar	Oreotrochilus chimborazo (Delattre & Bourcier, 1846)	110
Blue-throated hillstar	Oreotrochilus cyanolaemus Sornoza-Molina, Freile, Nilsson, J, Krabbe & Bonaccorso, 2018	111
Green-headed hillstar	Oreotrochilus stolzmanni Salvin, 1895	112
Black-breasted hillstar	Oreotrochilus melanogaster Gould, 1847	113
Wedge-tailed hillstar	Oreotrochilus adela (d'Orbigny, 1838)	114
Mountain avocetbill	Opisthoprora euryptera (Loddiges, 1832)	115
Black-tailed trainbearer	Lesbia victoriae (Bourcier & Mulsant, 1846)	116
Green-tailed trainbearer	Lesbia nuna (Lesson, RP, 1832)	117
Black-backed thornbill	Ramphomicron dorsale Salvin & Godman, 1880	118
Purple-backed thornbill	Ramphomicron microrhynchum (Boissonneau, 1840)	119
Bearded mountaineer	Oreonympha nobilis Gould, 1869	120
Buffy helmetcrest	Oxypogon stuebelii Meyer, AB, 1884	121
Blue-bearded helmetcrest	Oxypogon cyanolaemus Salvin & Godman, 1880	122
White-bearded helmetcrest	Oxypogon lindenii (Parzudaki, 1845)	123
Green-bearded helmetcrest	Oxypogon guerinii (Boissonneau, 1840)	124
Bronze-tailed thornbill	Chalcostigma heteropogon (Boissonneau, 1840)	125
Rainbow-bearded thornbill	Chalcostigma herrani (Delattre & Bourcier, 1846)	126
Rufous-capped thornbill	Chalcostigma ruficeps (Gould, 1846)	127
Olivaceous thornbill	Chalcostigma olivaceum (Lawrence, 1864)	128
Blue-mantled thornbill	Chalcostigma stanleyi (Bourcier, 1851)	129
Tyrian metaltail	Metallura tyrianthina (Loddiges, 1832)	130
Perija metaltail	Metallura iracunda Wetmore, 1946	131
Viridian metaltail	Metallura williami (Delattre & Bourcier, 1846)	132
Violet-throated metaltail	Metallura baroni Salvin, 1893	133
Neblina metaltail	Metallura odomae Graves, GR, 1980	134
Coppery metaltail	Metallura theresiae Simon, 1902	135
Fiery-throated metaltail	Metallura eupogon (Cabanis, 1874)	136
Scaled metaltail	Metallura aeneocauda (Gould, 1846)	137
Black metaltail	Metallura phoebe (Lesson, RP & Delattre, 1839)	138
Greenish puffleg	Haplophaedia aureliae (Bourcier & Mulsant, 1846)	139
Buff-thighed puffleg	Haplophaedia assimilis (Elliot, DG, 1876)	140
Hoary puffleg	Haplophaedia lugens (Gould, 1852)	141
Black-breasted puffleg	Eriocnemis nigrivestis (Bourcier & Mulsant, 1852)	142
Gorgeted puffleg	Eriocnemis isabellae Cortés-Diago, Ortega, Mazariegos-Hurtado & Weller, 2007	143
Glowing puffleg	Eriocnemis vestita (Lesson, RP, 1839)	144
Black-thighed puffleg	Eriocnemis derbyi (Delattre & Bourcier, 1846)	145
Turquoise-throated puffleg	Eriocnemis godini (Bourcier, 1851)	146
Coppery-bellied puffleg	Eriocnemis cupreoventris (Fraser, 1840)	147
Sapphire-vented puffleg	Eriocnemis luciani (Bourcier, 1847)	148
Golden-breasted puffleg	Eriocnemis mosquera (Delattre & Bourcier, 1846)	149
Blue-capped puffleg	Eriocnemis glaucopoides (d'Orbigny & Lafresnaye, 1838)	150
Colorful puffleg	Eriocnemis mirabilis Meyer de Schauensee, 1967	151
Emerald-bellied puffleg	Eriocnemis aline (Bourcier, 1843)	152
Marvelous spatuletail	Loddigesia mirabilis (Bourcier, 1847)	153
Shining sunbeam	Aglaeactis cupripennis (Bourcier, 1843)	154
White-tufted sunbeam	Aglaeactis castelnaudii (Bourcier & Mulsant, 1848)	155
Purple-backed sunbeam	Aglaeactis aliciae Salvin, 1896	156
Black-hooded sunbeam	Aglaeactis pamela (d'Orbigny, 1838)	157
Bronzy inca	Coeligena coeligena (Lesson, RP, 1833)	158
Brown inca	Coeligena wilsoni (Delattre & Bourcier, 1846)	159
Black inca	Coeligena prunellei (Bourcier, 1843)	160
Green inca	Coeligena conradii (Bourcier, 1847)	161
Collared inca	Coeligena torquata (Boissonneau, 1840)	162
Gould's inca	Coeligena inca (Gould, 1852)	163
Violet-throated starfrontlet	Coeligena violifer (Gould, 1846)	164
Rainbow starfrontlet	Coeligena iris (Gould, 1853)	165
White-tailed starfrontlet	Coeligena phalerata (Bangs, 1898)	166
Dusky starfrontlet	Coeligena orina Wetmore, 1953	167
Buff-winged starfrontlet	Coeligena lutetiae (Delattre & Bourcier, 1846)	168
Perija starfrontlet	Coeligena consita Wetmore & Phelps, WH Jr, 1952	169
Golden-bellied starfrontlet	Coeligena bonapartei (Boissonneau, 1840)	170
Golden-tailed starfrontlet	Coeligena eos (Gould, 1848)	171
Blue-throated starfrontlet	Coeligena helianthea (Lesson, RP, 1839)	172
Mountain velvetbreast	Lafresnaya lafresnayi (Boissonneau, 1840)	173
Sword-billed hummingbird	Ensifera ensifera (Boissonneau, 1840)	174
Great sapphirewing	Pterophanes cyanopterus (Fraser, 1840)	175
Buff-tailed coronet	Boissonneaua flavescens (Loddiges, 1832)	176
Chestnut-breasted coronet	Boissonneaua matthewsii (Bourcier, 1847)	177
Velvet-purple coronet	Boissonneaua jardini (Bourcier, 1851)	178
White-booted racket-tail	Ocreatus underwoodii (Lesson, RP, 1832)	179
Peruvian racket-tail	Ocreatus peruanus (Gould, 1849)	180
Rufous-booted racket-tail	Ocreatus addae (Bourcier, 1846)	181
Rufous-gaped hillstar	Urochroa bougueri (Bourcier, 1851)	182
Green-backed hillstar	Urochroa leucura Lawrence, 1864	183
Purple-bibbed whitetip	Urosticte benjamini (Bourcier, 1851)	184
Rufous-vented whitetip	Urosticte ruficrissa Lawrence, 1864	185
Velvet-browed brilliant	Heliodoxa xanthogonys Salvin & Godman, 1882	186
Pink-throated brilliant	Heliodoxa gularis (Gould, 1860)	187
Rufous-webbed brilliant	Heliodoxa branickii (Taczanowski, 1874)	188
Black-throated brilliant	Heliodoxa schreibersii (Bourcier, 1847)	189
Gould's jewelfront	Heliodoxa aurescens (Gould, 1846)	190
Fawn-breasted brilliant	Heliodoxa rubinoides (Bourcier & Mulsant, 1846)	191
Green-crowned brilliant	Heliodoxa jacula Gould, 1850	192
Empress brilliant	Heliodoxa imperatrix (Gould, 1856)	193
Violet-fronted brilliant	Heliodoxa leadbeateri (Bourcier, 1843)	194
Brazilian ruby	Heliodoxa rubricauda (Boddaert, 1783)	195
Giant hummingbird	Patagona gigas (Vieillot, 1824)	196
Violet-chested hummingbird	Sternoclyta cyanopectus (Gould, 1846)	197
Scissor-tailed hummingbird	Hylonympha macrocerca Gould, 1873	198
Rivoli's hummingbird	Eugenes fulgens (Swainson, 1827)	199
Talamanca hummingbird	Eugenes spectabilis (Lawrence, 1867)	200
Fiery-throated hummingbird	Panterpe insignis Cabanis & Heine, 1860	201
Long-billed starthroat	Heliomaster longirostris (Audebert & Vieillot, 1801)	202
Plain-capped starthroat	Heliomaster constantii (Delattre, 1843)	203
Stripe-breasted starthroat	Heliomaster squamosus (Temminck, 1823)	204
Blue-tufted starthroat	Heliomaster furcifer (Shaw, 1812)	205
White-bellied mountaingem	Lampornis hemileucus (Salvin, 1865)	206
Blue-throated mountaingem	Lampornis clemenciae (Lesson, RP, 1830)	207
Amethyst-throated mountaingem	Lampornis amethystinus Swainson, 1827	208
Green-throated mountaingem	Lampornis viridipallens (Bourcier & Mulsant, 1846)	209
Green-breasted mountaingem	Lampornis sybillae (Salvin & Godman, 1892)	210
Purple-throated mountaingem	Lampornis calolaemus (Salvin, 1865)	211
Grey-tailed mountaingem	Lampornis cinereicauda (Lawrence, 1867)	212
White-throated mountaingem	Lampornis castaneoventris (Gould, 1851)	213
Garnet-throated hummingbird	Lamprolaima rhami (Lesson, RP, 1839)	214
Amethyst woodstar	Calliphlox amethystina (Boddaert, 1783)	215
Purple-collared woodstar	Myrtis fanny (Lesson, RP, 1838)	216
Oasis hummingbird	Rhodopis vesper (Lesson, RP, 1829)	217
Short-tailed woodstar	Myrmia micrura (Gould, 1854)	218
Peruvian sheartail	Thaumastura cora (Lesson, RP & Garnot, 1827)	219
Magenta-throated woodstar	Philodice bryantae (Lawrence, 1867)	220
Purple-throated woodstar	Philodice mitchellii (Bourcier, 1847)	221
Chilean woodstar	Eulidia yarrellii (Bourcier, 1847)	222
Slender-tailed woodstar	Microstilbon burmeisteri (Sclater, PL, 1888)	223
White-bellied woodstar	Chaetocercus mulsant (Bourcier, 1843)	224
Little woodstar	Chaetocercus bombus Gould, 1871	225
Gorgeted woodstar	Chaetocercus heliodor (Bourcier, 1840)	226
Santa Marta woodstar	Chaetocercus astreans (Bangs, 1899)	227
Esmeraldas woodstar	Chaetocercus berlepschi Simon, 1889	228
Rufous-shafted woodstar	Chaetocercus jourdanii (Bourcier, 1839)	229
Sparkling-tailed woodstar	Tilmatura dupontii (Lesson, RP, 1832)	230
Slender sheartail	Doricha enicura (Vieillot, 1818)	231
Mexican sheartail	Doricha eliza (Lesson, RP & Delattre, 1839)	232
Lucifer sheartail	Calothorax lucifer (Swainson, 1827)	233
Beautiful sheartail	Calothorax pulcher Gould, 1859	234
Black-chinned hummingbird	Archilochus alexandri (Bourcier & Mulsant, 1846)	235
Ruby-throated hummingbird	Archilochus colubris (Linnaeus, 1758)	236
Vervain hummingbird	Mellisuga minima (Linnaeus, 1758)	237
Bee hummingbird	Mellisuga helenae (Lembeye, 1850)	238
Bahama woodstar	Nesophlox evelynae (Bourcier, 1847)	239
Inagua woodstar	Nesophlox lyrura (Gould, 1869)	240
Anna's hummingbird	Calypte anna (Lesson, RP, 1829)	241
Costa's hummingbird	Calypte costae (Bourcier, 1839)	242
Calliope hummingbird	Selasphorus calliope (Gould, 1847)	243
Rufous hummingbird	Selasphorus rufus (Gmelin, JF, 1788)	244
Allen's hummingbird	Selasphorus sasin (Lesson, RP, 1829)	245
Broad-tailed hummingbird	Selasphorus platycercus (Swainson, 1827)	246
Bumblebee hummingbird	Selasphorus heloisa (Lesson, RP & Delattre, 1839)	247
Wine-throated hummingbird	Selasphorus ellioti (Ridgway, 1878)	248
Volcano hummingbird	Selasphorus flammula Salvin, 1865	249
Scintillant hummingbird	Selasphorus scintilla (Gould, 1851)	250
Glow-throated hummingbird	Selasphorus ardens Salvin, 1870	251
Dusky hummingbird	Phaeoptila sordida (Gould, 1859)	252
Cuban emerald	Riccordia ricordii (Gervais, 1835)	253
Brace's emerald	Riccordia bracei (Lawrence, 1877)	254
Hispaniolan emerald	Riccordia swainsonii (Lesson, RP, 1829)	255
Puerto Rican emerald	Riccordia maugaeus (Audebert & Vieillot, 1801)	256
Blue-headed hummingbird	Riccordia bicolor (Gmelin, JF, 1788)	257
Broad-billed hummingbird	Cynanthus latirostris Swainson, 1827	258
Tres Marias hummingbird	Cynanthus lawrencei (Berlepsch, 1887)	259
Turquoise-crowned hummingbird	Cynanthus doubledayi (Bourcier, 1847)	260
Golden-crowned emerald	Cynanthus auriceps (Gould, 1852)	261
Cozumel emerald	Cynanthus forficatus (Ridgway, 1885)	262
Canivet's emerald	Cynanthus canivetii (Lesson, RP, 1832)	263
Garden emerald	Chlorostilbon assimilis Lawrence, 1861	264
Western emerald	Chlorostilbon melanorhynchus Gould, 1860	265
Red-billed emerald	Chlorostilbon gibsoni (Fraser, 1840)	266
Blue-tailed emerald	Chlorostilbon mellisugus (Linnaeus, 1758)	267
Chiribiquete emerald	Chlorostilbon olivaresi Stiles, 1996	268
Glittering-bellied emerald	Chlorostilbon lucidus (Shaw, 1812)	269
Coppery emerald	Chlorostilbon russatus (Salvin & Godman, 1881)	270
Narrow-tailed emerald	Chlorostilbon stenurus (Cabanis & Heine, 1860)	271
Green-tailed emerald	Chlorostilbon alice (Bourcier & Mulsant, 1848)	272
Short-tailed emerald	Chlorostilbon poortmani (Bourcier, 1843)	273
White-eared hummingbird	Basilinna leucotis (Vieillot, 1818)	274
Xantus's hummingbird	Basilinna xantusii (Lawrence, 1860)	275
Curve-winged sabrewing	Pampa curvipennis (Deppe, 1830)	276
Wedge-tailed sabrewing	Pampa pampa (Lesson, RP, 1832)	277
Rufous sabrewing	Pampa rufa (Lesson, RP, 1840)	278
Emerald-chinned hummingbird	Abeillia abeillei (Lesson, RP & Delattre, 1839)	279
Violet-headed hummingbird	Klais guimeti (Bourcier, 1843)	280
Antillean crested hummingbird	Orthorhyncus cristatus (Linnaeus, 1758)	281
Santa Marta blossomcrown	Anthocephala floriceps (Gould, 1853)	282
Tolima blossomcrown	Anthocephala berlepschi Salvin, 1893	283
Green-crowned plovercrest	Stephanoxis lalandi (Vieillot, 1818)	284
Purple-crowned plovercrest	Stephanoxis loddigesii (Vigors, 1831)	285
Grey-breasted sabrewing	Campylopterus largipennis (Boddaert, 1783)	286
Outcrop sabrewing	Campylopterus calcirupicola Lopes, de Vasconcelos & Gonzaga, 2017	287
Diamantina sabrewing	Campylopterus diamantinensis Ruschi, 1963	288
Rufous-breasted sabrewing	Campylopterus hyperythrus Cabanis, 1849	289
White-tailed sabrewing	Campylopterus ensipennis (Swainson, 1822)	290
Lazuline sabrewing	Campylopterus falcatus (Swainson, 1821)	291
Santa Marta sabrewing	Campylopterus phainopeplus Salvin & Godman, 1879	292
Violet sabrewing	Campylopterus hemileucurus (Deppe, 1830)	293
Buff-breasted sabrewing	Campylopterus duidae Chapman, 1929	294
Napo sabrewing	Campylopterus villaviscensio (Bourcier, 1851)	295
Bronze-tailed plumeleteer	Chalybura urochrysia (Gould, 1861)	296
White-vented plumeleteer	Chalybura buffonii (Lesson, RP, 1832)	297
Crowned woodnymph	Thalurania colombica (Bourcier, 1843)	298
Fork-tailed woodnymph	Thalurania furcata (Gmelin, JF, 1788)	299
Long-tailed woodnymph	Thalurania watertonii (Bourcier, 1847)	300
Violet-capped woodnymph	Thalurania glaucopis (Gmelin, JF, 1788)	301
Snowcap	Microchera albocoronata (Lawrence, 1855)	302
Coppery-headed emerald	Microchera cupreiceps (Lawrence, 1866)	303
White-tailed emerald	Microchera chionura (Gould, 1851)	304
Violet-capped hummingbird	Goldmania violiceps Nelson, 1911	305
Pirre hummingbird	Goldmania bella (Nelson, 1912)	306
Mexican woodnymph	Eupherusa ridgwayi (Nelson, 1900)	307
White-tailed hummingbird	Eupherusa poliocerca Elliot, DG, 1871	308
Oaxaca hummingbird	Eupherusa cyanophrys Rowley, JS & Orr, 1964	309
Stripe-tailed hummingbird	Eupherusa eximia (Delattre, 1843)	310
Black-bellied hummingbird	Eupherusa nigriventris Lawrence, 1868	311
Scaly-breasted hummingbird	Phaeochroa cuvierii (Delattre & Bourcier, 1846)	312
Buffy hummingbird	Leucippus fallax (Bourcier, 1843)	313
Tumbes hummingbird	Thaumasius baeri (Simon, 1901)	314
Spot-throated hummingbird	Thaumasius taczanowskii Sclater, PL, 1879	315
Many-spotted hummingbird	Taphrospilus hypostictus (Gould, 1862)	316
Swallow-tailed hummingbird	Eupetomena macroura (Gmelin, JF, 1788)	317
Sombre hummingbird	Eupetomena cirrochloris (Vieillot, 1818)	318
Olive-spotted hummingbird	Talaphorus chlorocercus (Gould, 1866)	319
Red-billed streamertail	Trochilus polytmus Linnaeus, 1758	320
Black-billed streamertail	Trochilus scitulus (Brewster & Bangs, 1901)	321
Violet-crowned hummingbird	Ramosomyia violiceps (Gould, 1859)	322
Green-fronted hummingbird	Ramosomyia viridifrons (Elliot, DG, 1871)	323
Cinnamon-sided hummingbird	Ramosomyia wagneri (Phillips, AR, 1966)	324
Azure-crowned hummingbird	Saucerottia cyanocephala (Lesson, RP, 1830)	325
Blue-vented hummingbird	Saucerottia hoffmanni (Cabanis & Heine, 1860)	326
Berylline hummingbird	Saucerottia beryllina (Deppe, 1830)	327
Blue-tailed hummingbird	Saucerottia cyanura (Gould, 1859)	328
Snowy-bellied hummingbird	Saucerottia edward (Delattre & Bourcier, 1846)	329
Steely-vented hummingbird	Saucerottia saucerottei (Delattre & Bourcier, 1846)	330
Indigo-capped hummingbird	Saucerottia cyanifrons (Bourcier, 1843)	331
Chestnut-bellied hummingbird	Saucerottia castaneiventris (Gould, 1856)	332
Green-bellied hummingbird	Saucerottia viridigaster (Bourcier, 1843)	333
Copper-tailed hummingbird	Saucerottia cupreicauda (Salvin & Godman, 1884)	334
Copper-rumped hummingbird	Saucerottia tobaci (Gmelin, JF, 1788)	335
Cinnamon hummingbird	Amazilia rutila (Delattre, 1843)	336
Buff-bellied hummingbird	Amazilia yucatanensis (Cabot, S, 1845)	337
Rufous-tailed hummingbird	Amazilia tzacatl (de la Llave, 1833)	338
Honduran emerald	Amazilia luciae (Lawrence, 1868)	339
Amazilia hummingbird	Amazilis amazilia (Lesson, RP & Garnot, 1827)	340
Andean emerald	Uranomitra franciae (Bourcier & Mulsant, 1846)	341
Shining-green hummingbird	Chrysuronia goudoti (Bourcier, 1843)	342
Golden-tailed sapphire	Chrysuronia oenone (Lesson, RP, 1832)	343
Versicolored emerald	Chrysuronia versicolor (Vieillot, 1818)	344
Mangrove hummingbird	Chrysuronia boucardi (Mulsant, 1877)	345
Sapphire-throated hummingbird	Chrysuronia coeruleogularis (Gould, 1851)	346
Sapphire-bellied hummingbird	Chrysuronia lilliae (Stone, 1917)	347
Humboldt's sapphire	Chrysuronia humboldtii (Bourcier & Mulsant, 1852)	348
Blue-headed sapphire	Chrysuronia grayi (Delattre & Bourcier, 1846)	349
White-chested emerald	Chrysuronia brevirostris (Lesson, RP, 1829)	350
Plain-bellied emerald	Chrysuronia leucogaster (Gmelin, JF, 1788)	351
White-throated hummingbird	Leucochloris albicollis (Vieillot, 1818)	352
Glittering-throated emerald	Chionomesa fimbriata (Gmelin, JF, 1788)	353
Sapphire-spangled emerald	Chionomesa lactea (Lesson, RP, 1832)	354
Rufous-throated sapphire	Hylocharis sapphirina (Gmelin, JF, 1788)	355
Gilded sapphire	Hylocharis chrysura (Shaw, 1812)	356
White-bellied hummingbird	Elliotomyia chionogaster (Tschudi, 1846)	357
Green-and-white hummingbird	Elliotomyia viridicauda (Berlepsch, 1883)	358
Blue-chested hummingbird	Polyerata amabilis (Gould, 1853)	359
Charming hummingbird	Polyerata decora Salvin, 1891	360
Purple-chested hummingbird	Polyerata rosenbergi Boucard, 1895	361
White-bellied emerald	Chlorestes candida (Bourcier & Mulsant, 1846)	362
Blue-throated sapphire	Chlorestes eliciae (Bourcier & Mulsant, 1846)	363
White-chinned sapphire	Chlorestes cyanus (Vieillot, 1818)	364
Violet-bellied hummingbird	Chlorestes julie (Bourcier, 1843)	365
Blue-chinned sapphire	Chlorestes notata (Reich, 1793)	366
