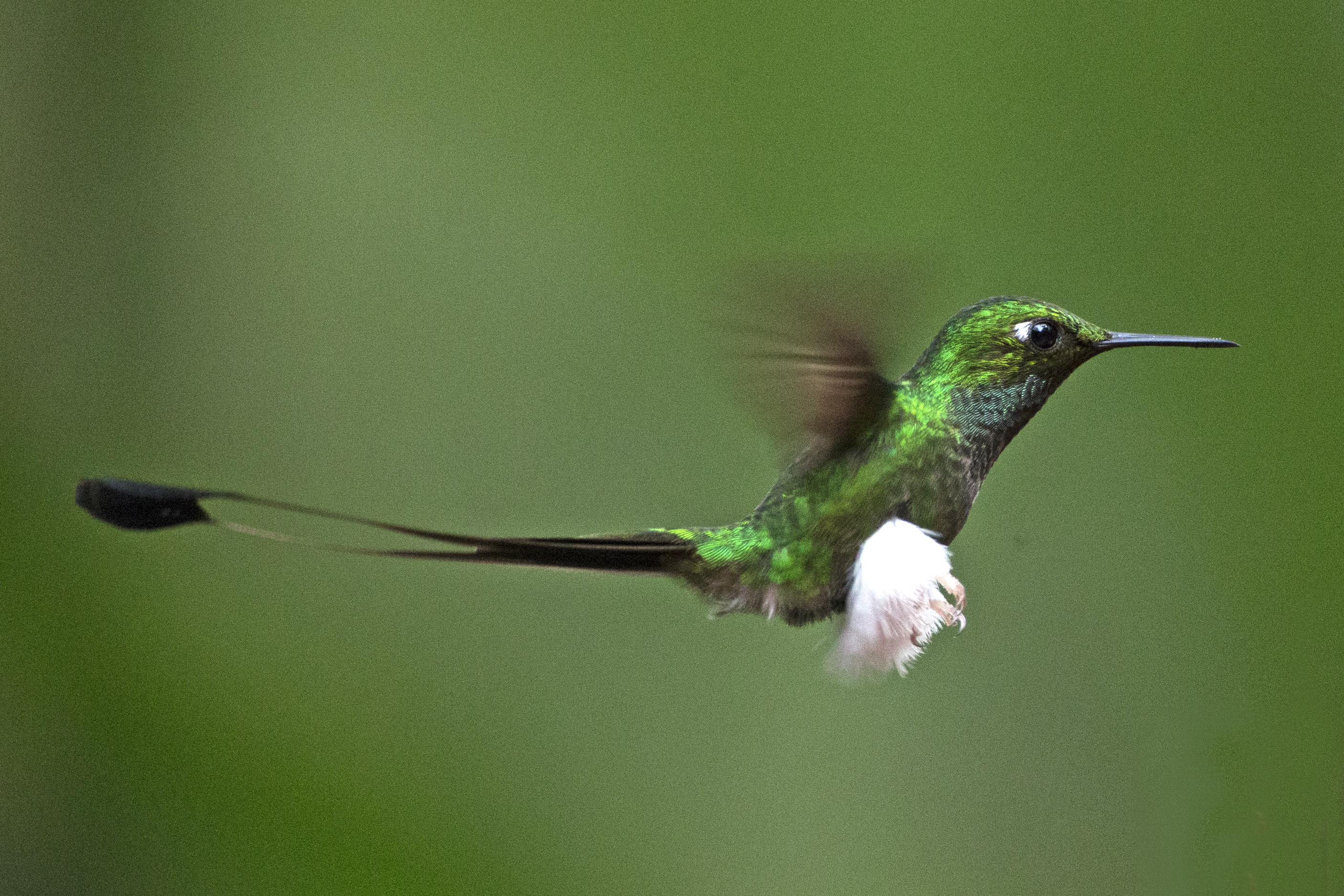
- Male white-booted racket-tail

Scientific classification
- Kingdom: Animalia
- Phylum: Chordata
- Class: Aves
- Order: Apodiformes
- Family: Trochilidae
- Tribe: Heliantheini
- Genus: Ocreatus; Gould, 1846

Type species
- Trochilus addae Bourcier, 1846
- Distribution of the genus Ocreatus in green

= Booted racket-tail =

Genus of birds

The booted racket-tails are a small group of hummingbirds in the genus Ocreatus that was long considered to have only one species, O. underwoodii. They are native to cloud forest edges in the South American Andes and Maritime Andes. They are relatively small (even compared to most other hummingbirds), and primarily iridescent green with white or rufous-buff leg-puffs ("boots"). The leg-puffs are more conspicuous in males, which also have a pair of dark bluish racket-shaped extensions to the tail.

== Taxonomy ==
The genus Ocreatus was described by John Gould in 1846. During the 19th century, several populations were described as different species, but since the mid-20th century authorities generally only recognized a single widespread species, O. underwoodii, with several subspecies. Research published in 2016, however, argued that three subspecies groups, addae, annae and peruanus, that are mostly allopatric (only peruanus and underwoodii have ranges that are known to very locally come into contact) were sufficiently different for raising them to species level. The research results have been mostly accepted by the International Ornithological Union, with more data required for the species status of Anna's racket-tail (annae), which they instead regard as a subspecies of O. addae. The American Ornithological Society has yet to recognize the split and continue to place all in a single widespread species.

=== Species ===
The genus contains three species:

Genus Ocreatus – Gould, 1846 – three species
Common name	Scientific name and subspecies	Range	Size and ecology	IUCN status and estimated population
Peruvian racket-tail Male Female	Ocreatus peruanus (Gould, 1849)	eastern Ecuador and northern Peru	Size: Habitat: Diet:	LC
Rufous-booted racket-tail Male	Ocreatus addae (Bourcier, 1846)	southern Peru (annae) and Bolivia (addae)	Size: Habitat: Diet:	LC
White-booted racket-tail Male Female	Ocreatus underwoodii (Lesson, 1832) Five subspecies: O. u. polystictus Todd, 1942; O. u. discifer (Heine, 1863); O. u. underwoodii (Lesson, 1832); O. u. incommodus (Kleinschmidt, 1943); O. u. melanantherus (Jardine, 1851)	northwestern Venezuela, Colombia and western Ecuador	Size: Habitat: Diet:	LC

== See also ==
- Marvelous spatuletail (Loddigesia mirabilis) - another Andean hummingbird with a somewhat similar tail
- Racket-tailed coquette (Discosura longicaudus) - a hummingbird of northeastern and eastern South America with a somewhat similar tail
