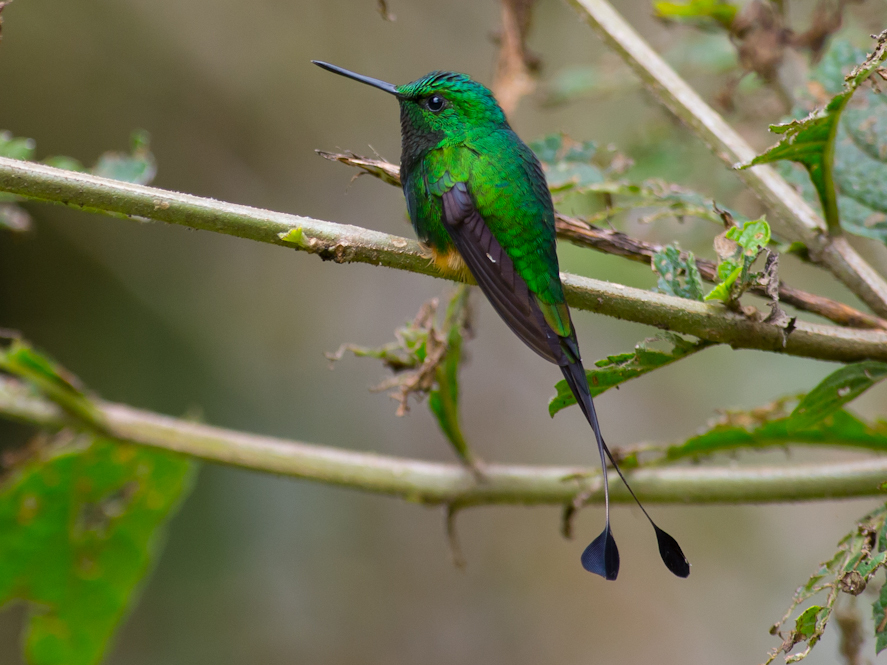
- Male

Conservation status
- Least Concern (IUCN 3.1)(See Status section)
- CITES Appendix II

Scientific classification
- Kingdom: Animalia
- Phylum: Chordata
- Class: Aves
- Order: Apodiformes
- Family: Trochilidae
- Genus: Ocreatus
- Species: O. addae

Binomial name
- Ocreatus addae (Bourcier, 1846)

Synonyms
- Trochilus addae Bourcier, 1846

= Rufous-booted racket-tail =

Species of hummingbird

The rufous-booted racket-tail (Ocreatus addae) is a species of hummingbird in the "brilliants", tribe Heliantheini in subfamily Lesbiinae. It is found in Bolivia and Peru.

== Taxonomy and systematics ==
The rufous-booted racket-tail, as defined by the International Ornithological Committee (IOC) and the Clements taxonomy, is one of three species in genus Ocreatus. However, BirdLife International's Handbook of the Birds of the World (HBW) treats the taxon as one of eight subspecies of booted racket-tail (O. underwoodii). The IOC and Clements call underwoodii "white-booted racket-tail" and assign five subspecies to it. HBW splits the Peruvian population from O. underwoodii addae as O. underwoodii annae, leaving the former as a Bolivian endemic subspecies. The South American Classification Committee of the American Ornithological Society (SACC) follows the eight-subspecies model of booted racket-tail but has requested a proposal to elevate O. addae, O. annae, and another subspecies to species status.

The specific epithet addae honors Mrs. Adda Wilson.

== Description ==
All racket-tails have pronounced sexual dimorphism. Only the male has elongated outer rectrices (tail feathers) that have bare shafts with terminal flags. On both the annae and addae racket-tails, those feathers are decurved and cross; the flags are asymmetric ellipses. Male rufous-booted racket-tails are 11 to 15 cm (4.3 to 5.9 in) long including the 5.5 to 6 cm (2.2 to 2.4 in) long outer tail feathers, and weigh 2.5 to 2.7 g (0.088 to 0.095 oz). Females are 7.6 to 9 cm (3.0 to 3.5 in) long and weigh 2.6 to 3.2 g (0.092 to 0.11 oz). Both sexes of annae and addae have greenish upperparts without a glittering forehead, both have a white spot behind the eye, and both have buff leg puffs. Males of annae have a greenish gray throat and a solid green belly. Their tail flags are dark bronzy purple. Females have a white throat and breast heavily spotted with green. Males of addae have a mostly white throat with some green and a white belly with green spots. Their tail flags are greenish black. Like annae, females have a white throat and breast heavily spotted with green.

== Distribution and habitat ==
The annae rufous-booted racket-tail is found on the east slope of the Andes of central and southern Peru. The addae rufous-booted racket-tail is found on the east slope of the Bolivian Andes. The species favors the edges of humid to wet forest but is also found in the forest interior and in more open secondary forest. It is most numerous at elevations between 1,600 and 2,200 m (5,200 and 7,200 ft) but is found as low as 600 m (2,000 ft) and as high as 4,000 m (13,000 ft).

== Behavior ==
=== Movement ===
The rufous-booted racket-tail makes seasonal elevational movements after breeding.

=== Feeding ===
The rufous-booted racket-tail typically forages between 6 and 18 m (20 and 60 ft) above the ground. It takes nectar from a variety of plants such as those of genera Palicourea, Clusia, Inga, and Cavendishia. Often several birds will feed close together. In addition to feeding on nectar it captures small insects by hawking from a perch.

=== Breeding ===
The rufous-booted racket-tail's breeding season has not been studied but might include most of the year. It makes a tiny cup nest of plant fiber and lichen, typically on a horizontal twig 6 to 8 m (20 to 30 ft) above the ground. The female incubates the clutch of two eggs for 16 to 17 days; fledging occurs 19 to 22 days after hatch.

=== Vocalization ===
Both male and female rufous-booted racket-tails give "a diagnostic, descending, thin sweet trill, 'ti-tlee-ee-ee' [and] single 'tsit' and 'trrt' notes."

== Status ==
The IUCN follows HBW taxonomy and so recognizes only one species of Ocreatus as the booted racket-tail. It has assessed the species as being of Least Concern. It has a large range, and though its population size is not known it is believed to be stable. No immediate threats are known. The racket-tail complex as a whole is very common and occurs in several protected areas.
