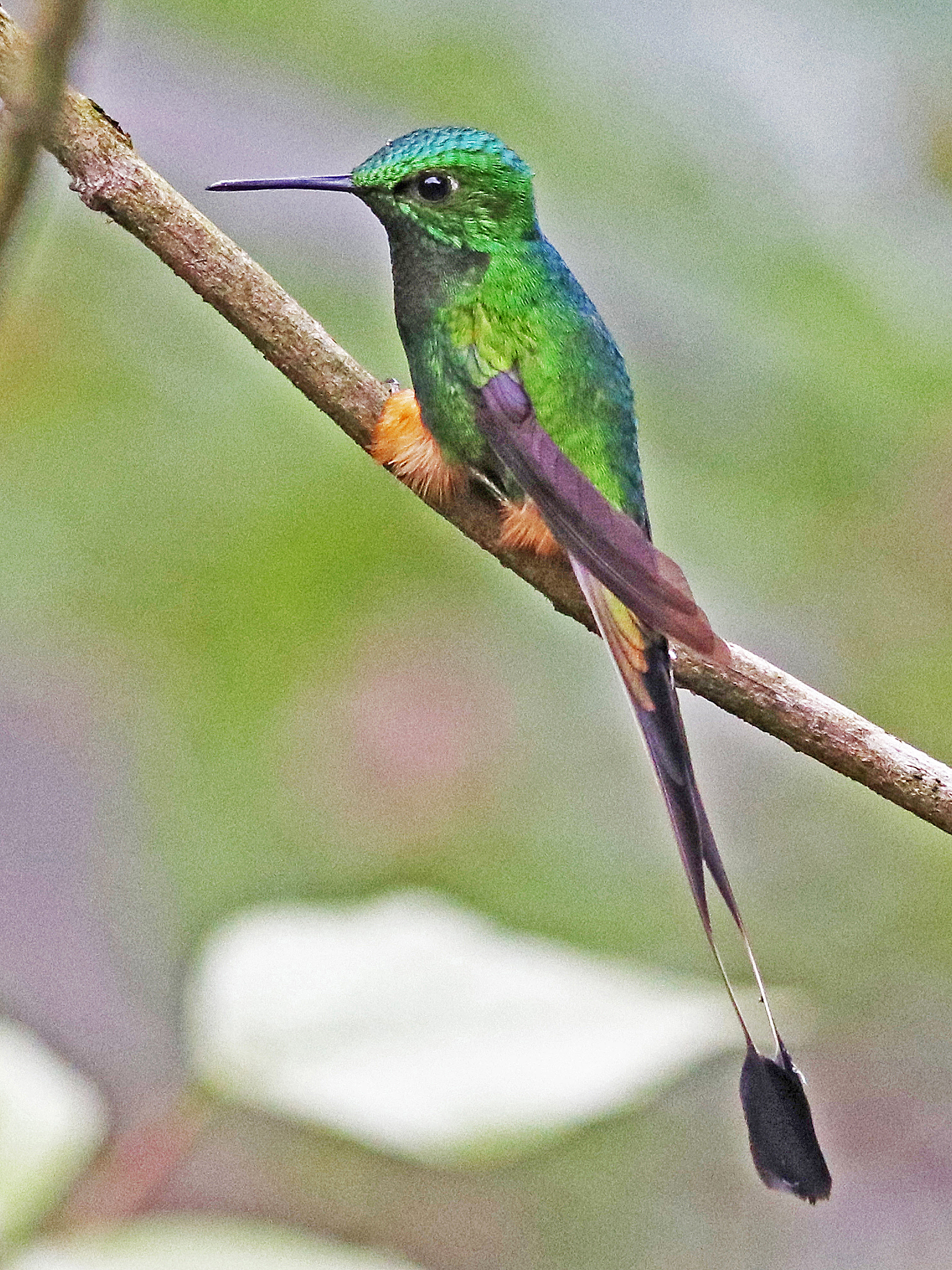
- Male
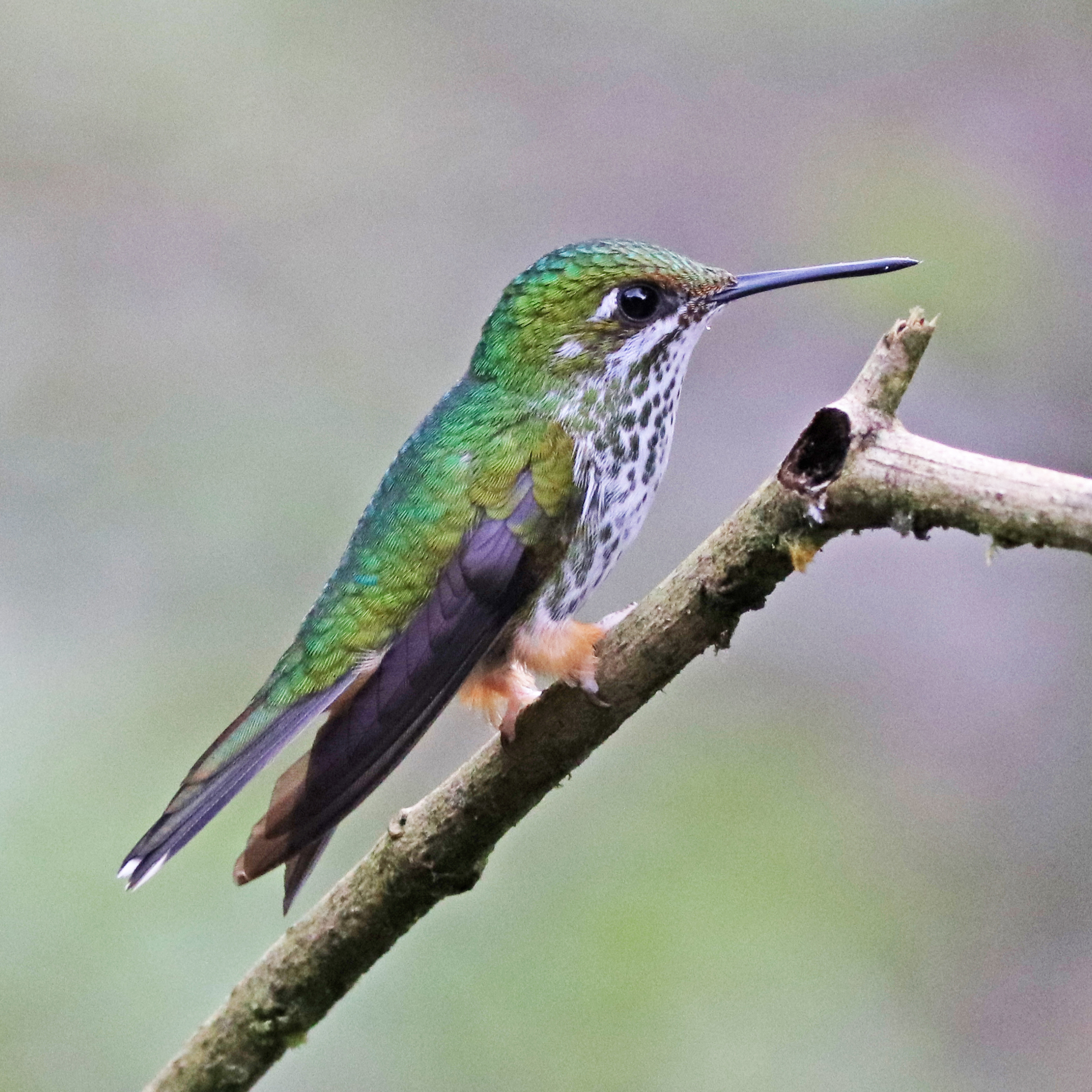
- Female both in eastern Ecuador

Conservation status
- Least Concern (IUCN 3.1)(See Status section)
- CITES Appendix II

Scientific classification
- Kingdom: Animalia
- Phylum: Chordata
- Class: Aves
- Clade: Strisores
- Order: Apodiformes
- Family: Trochilidae
- Genus: Ocreatus
- Species: O. peruanus

Binomial name
- Ocreatus peruanus (Gould, 1849)

Synonyms
- Ocreatus underwoodii subsp. peruanus (Gould, 1849); Spathura peruana Gould, 1849

= Peruvian racket-tail =

Species of hummingbird

The Peruvian racket-tail (Ocreatus peruanus) is a species of hummingbird in the "brilliants", tribe Heliantheini in subfamily Lesbiinae. It is found in Ecuador and Peru.

== Taxonomy and systematics ==
The Peruvian racket-tail, as defined by the International Ornithological Committee (IOC) and the Clements taxonomy, is one of three species in genus Ocreatus. However, BirdLife International's Handbook of the Birds of the World (HBW) treats the taxon as one of eight subspecies of booted racket-tail (O. underwoodii). The IOC and Clements call underwoodii "white-booted racket-tail" and assign five subspecies to it. The South American Classification Committee of the American Ornithological Society (SACC) follows the eight-subspecies model of booted racket-tail but has requested a proposal to elevate O. peruanus and two other subspecies to species status.

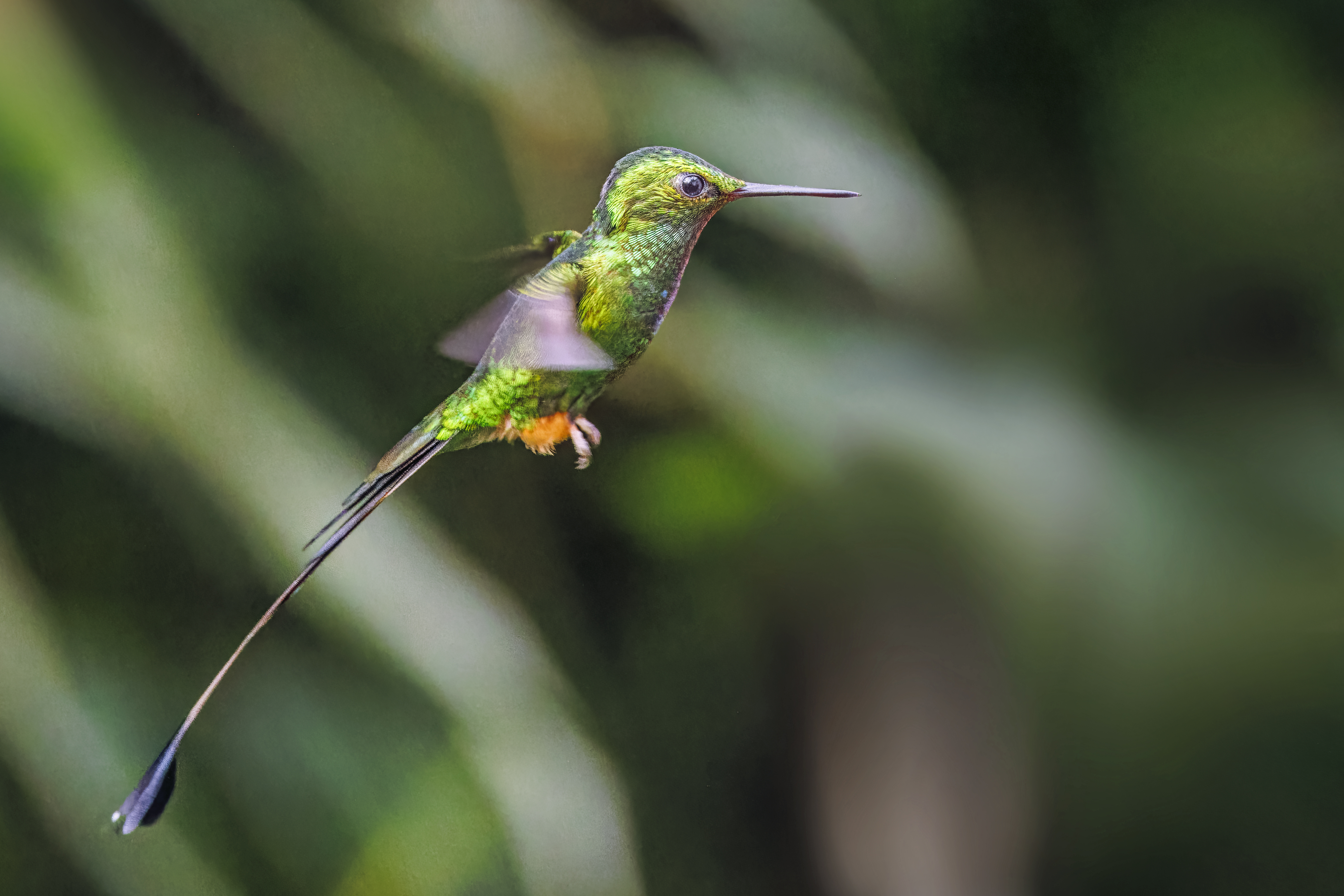
male

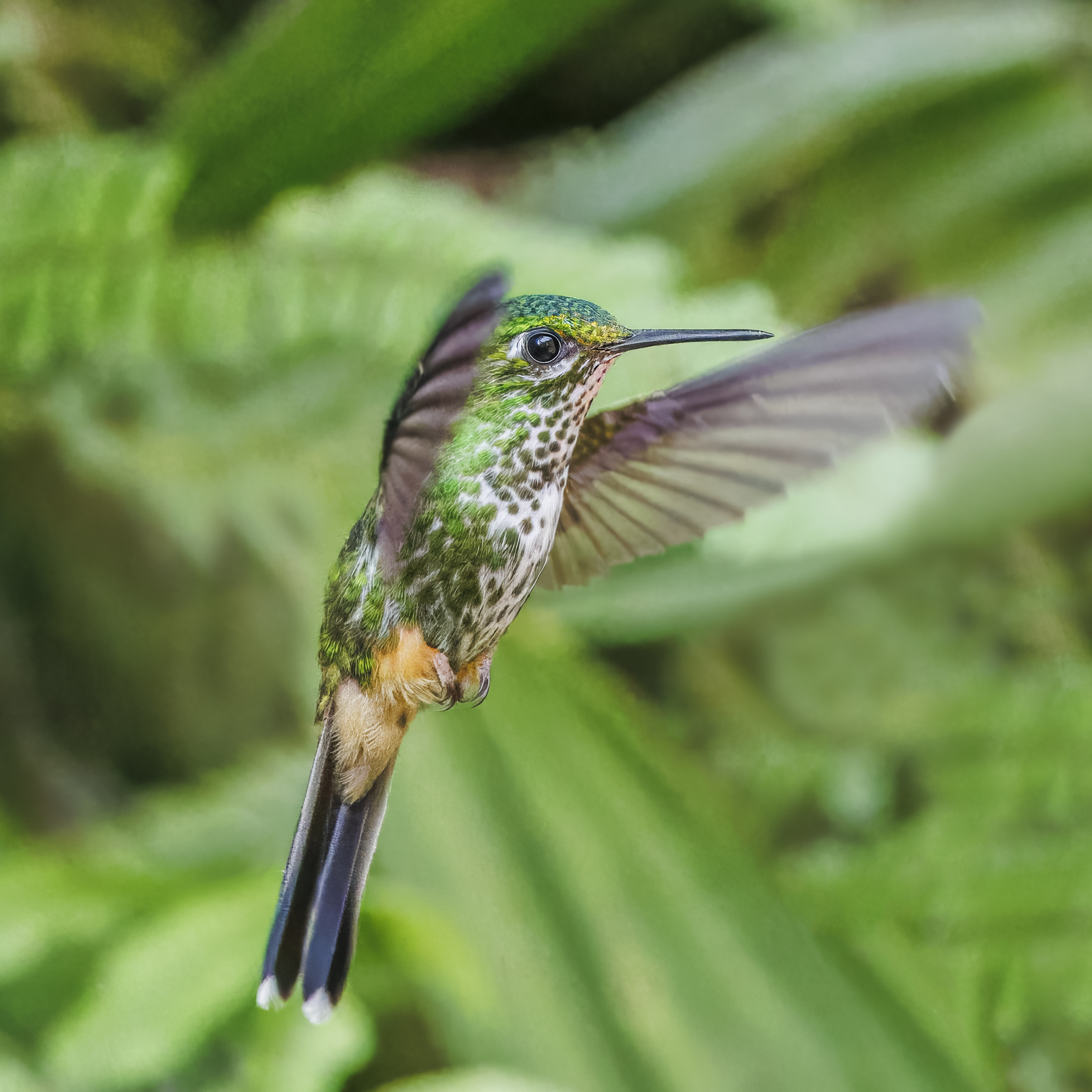
female

== Description ==
All racket-tails have pronounced sexual dimorphism. Only the male has elongated outer rectrices (tail feathers) that have bare shafts with terminal flags. On the Peruvian racket-tail, those feathers are straight and do not cross; the flags are narrow ovals that slightly overlap. Male Peruvian racket-tails are 11 to 15 cm (4.3 to 5.9 in) long including the 7 to 8 cm (2.8 to 3.1 in) long outer tail feathers, and weigh 2.5 to 2.7 g (0.088 to 0.095 oz). Females are 7.6 to 9 cm (3.0 to 3.5 in) long and weigh 2.6 to 3.2 g (0.092 to 0.11 oz). Both sexes have greenish upperparts without a glittering forehead, both have a white spot behind the eye, and both have cinnamon leg puffs. Males have a greenish gray throat and a solid green belly. Their tail flags are greenish black. Females have a white throat and breast heavily spotted with green.

== Distribution and habitat ==
The Peruvian racket-tail is found in eastern Ecuador and northeastern Peru as far as Huánuco Department. It inhabits the temperate and subtropical Andes. It favors the edges of humid to wet forest but is also found in the forest interior and in more open secondary forest. It is most numerous at elevations between 1,600 and 2,200 m (5,200 and 7,200 ft) but is found as low as 600 m (2,000 ft) and as high as 4,000 m (13,000 ft).

== Behavior ==
=== Movement ===
The Peruvian racket-tail makes seasonal elevational movements after breeding.

=== Feeding ===
The Peruvian racket-tail typically forages between 6 and 18 m (20 and 60 ft) above the ground. It takes nectar from a variety of plants such as those of genera Palicourea, Clusia, Inga, and Cavendishia. Often several birds will feed close together. In addition to feeding on nectar it captures small insects by hawking from a perch.

=== Breeding ===
The Peruvian racket-tail's breeding season has not been studied but might include most of the year. It makes a tiny cup nest of plant fiber and lichen, typically on a horizontal twig 6 to 8 m (20 to 30 ft) above the ground. The female incubates the clutch of two eggs for 16 to 17 days; fledging occurs 19 to 22 days after hatch.

=== Vocalization ===
Both male and female Peruvian racket-tails give "a diagnostic, descending, thin sweet trill, 'ti-tlee-ee-ee' [and] single 'tsit' and 'trrt' notes."

== Status ==
The IUCN follows HBW taxonomy and so recognizes only one species of Ocreatus as the booted racket-tail. It has assessed the species as being of Least Concern. It has a large range, and though its population size is not known it is believed to be stable. No immediate threats are known. The racket-tail complex as a whole is very common and occurs in several protected areas.
