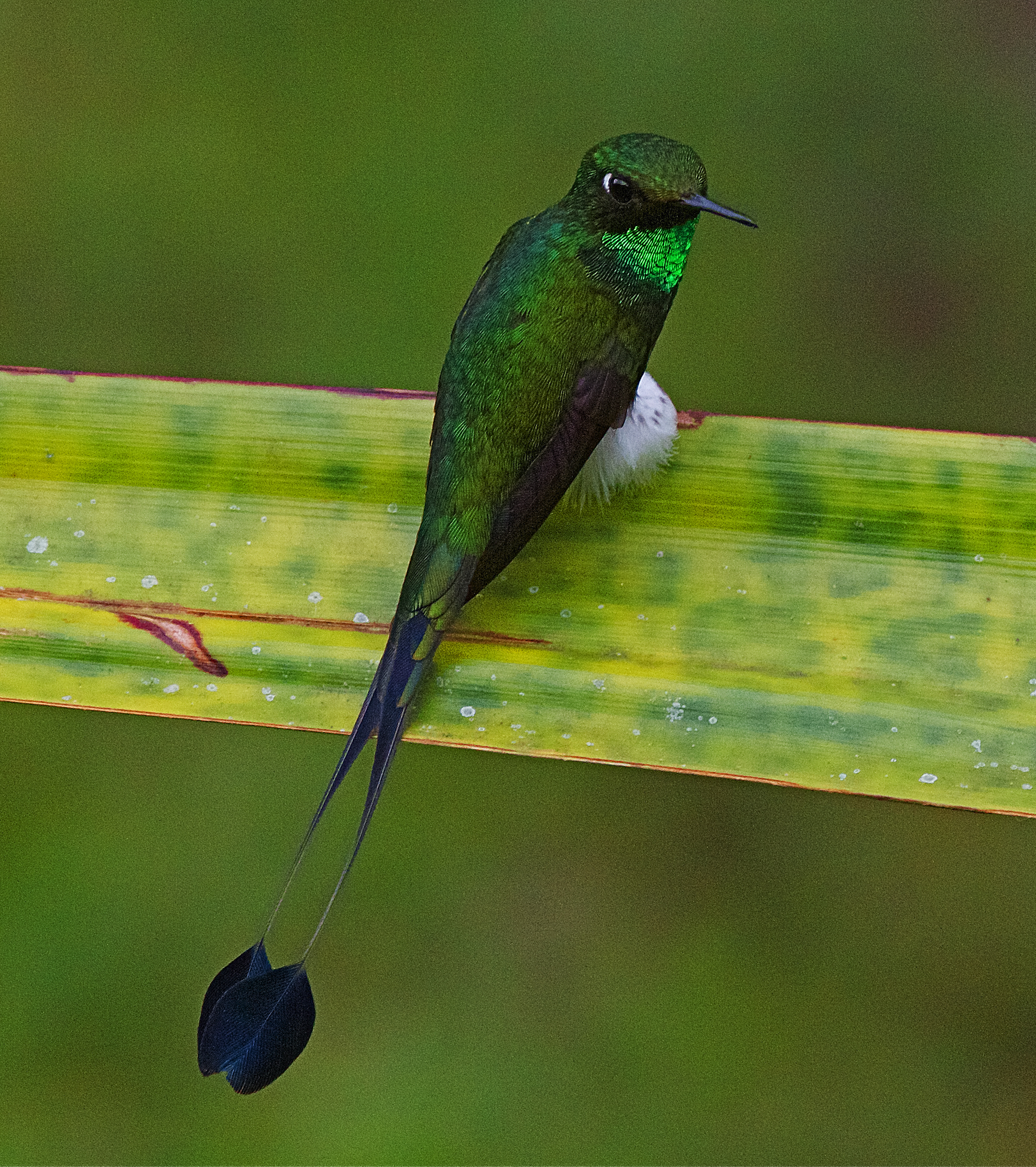
- Male in Ecuador showing iridescent green throat patch and oval shaped flags at the end of its outer tail feathers

Conservation status
- Least Concern (IUCN 3.1)
- CITES Appendix II

Scientific classification
- Kingdom: Animalia
- Phylum: Chordata
- Class: Aves
- Order: Apodiformes
- Family: Trochilidae
- Genus: Ocreatus
- Species: O. underwoodii

Binomial name
- Ocreatus underwoodii (Lesson, 1832)

= White-booted racket-tail =

Species of hummingbird

The white-booted racket-tail (Ocreatus underwoodii) is a species of hummingbird in the "brilliants", tribe Heliantheini in subfamily Lesbiinae. It is found in Colombia, Ecuador, and Venezuela.

== Taxonomy and systematics ==
The white-booted racket-tail, as defined by the International Ornithological Committee (IOC) and the Clements taxonomy, has five subspecies. They both include two more species in genus Ocreatus, the Peruvian racket-tail (O. peruanus) and the Rufous-booted racket-tail (O. addae). However, BirdLife International's Handbook of the Birds of the World (HBW) assigns the name "booted racket-tail" to O. underwoodii and includes those two taxa as subspecies of it. HBW also includes an eighth subspecies, O. u. annae. The South American Classification Committee of the American Ornithological Society (SACC) follows the eight-subspecies model but has requested a proposal to elevate puruanus, addae, and annae to species status.

The five subspecies recognized by the IOC are:

- O. u. polystictus Todd (1942)
- O. u. discifer Heine (1863)
- O. u. underwoodii Lesson (1832)
- O. u. incommodus Kleinschmidt (1943)
- O. u. melanantherus Jardine (1851)
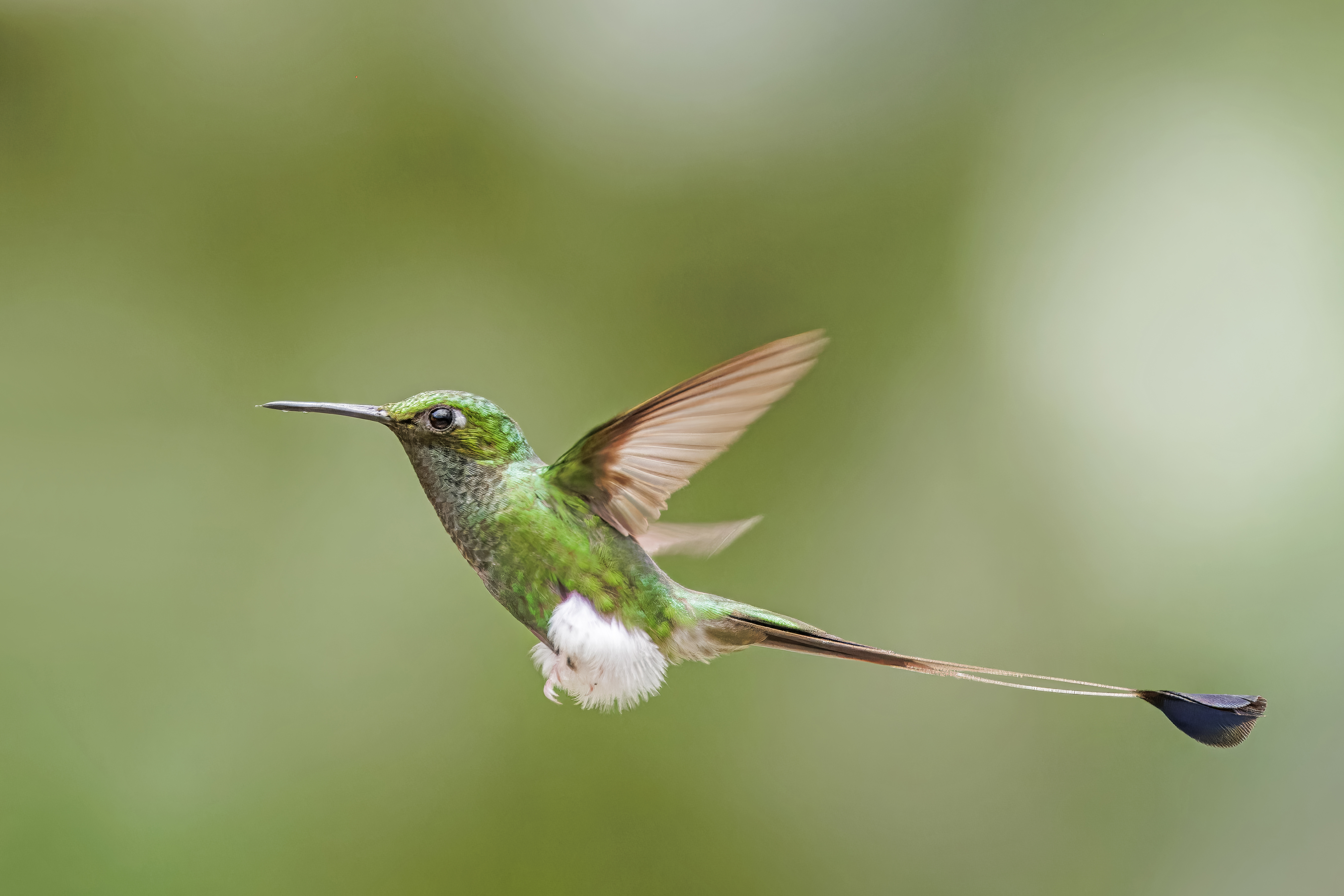
Male O. u. melanantherus, Ecuador

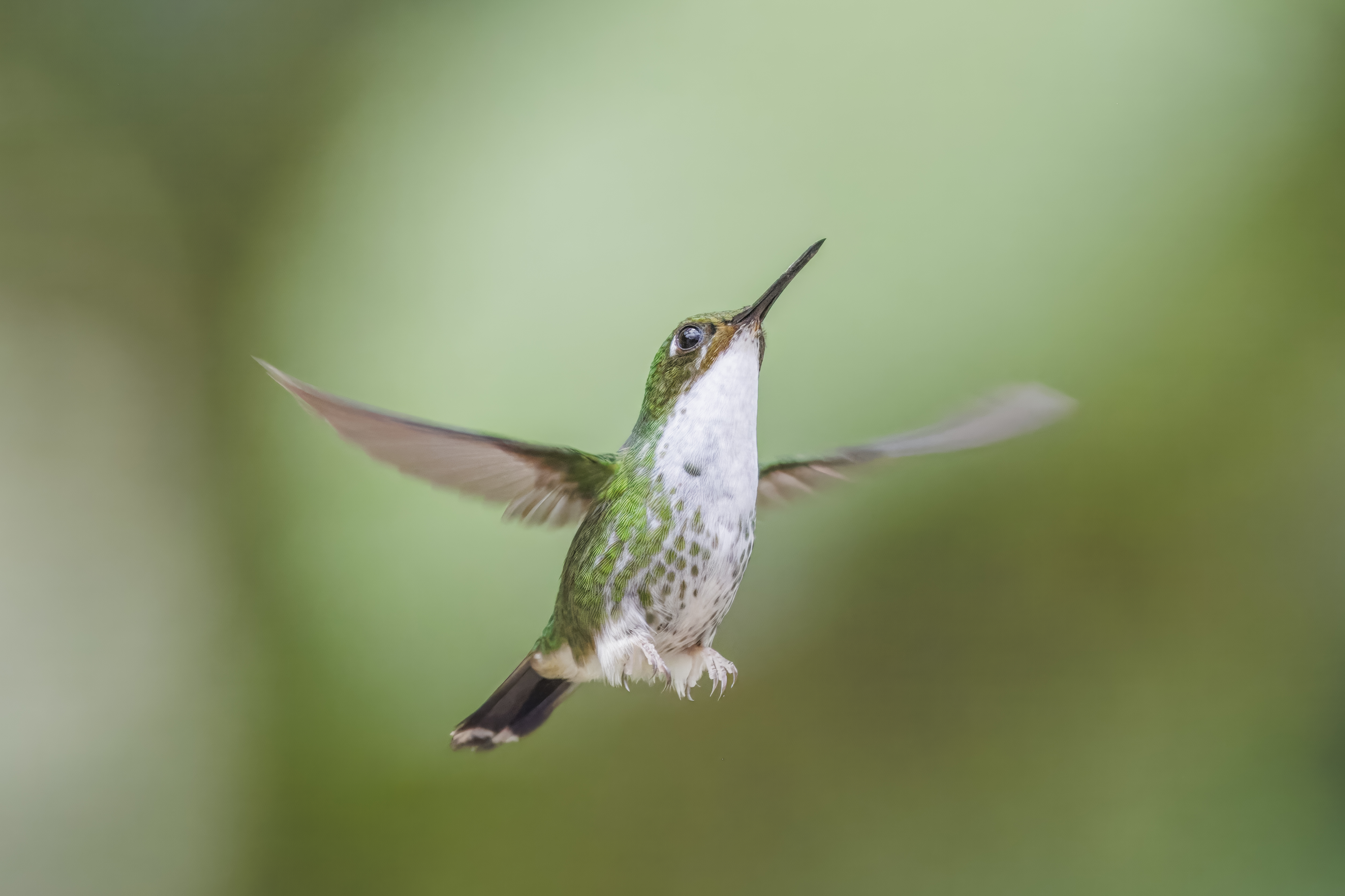
Female O. u. melanantherus, Ecuador

== Description ==
All racket-tails have pronounced sexual dimorphism. Only the male has elongated outer rectrices (tail feathers). These tail feathers have bare shafts with long terminal oval flags. In all five subspecies of white-booted racket-tail those feathers are straight and do not cross; the flags slightly overlap. Both sexes of all have greenish upperparts without a glittering forehead, and all have white leg puffs. Males have a greenish gray throat and a solid green belly. Male white-booted racket-tails are 11 to 15 cm (4.3 to 5.9 in) long including the 7 to 8 cm (2.8 to 3.1 in) long outer tail feathers, and weigh 2.5 to 2.7 g (0.088 to 0.095 oz). Females are 7.6 to 9 cm (3.0 to 3.5 in) long and weigh 2.6 to 3.2 g (0.092 to 0.11 oz).

The subspecies of male white-booted racket-tails differ in the color and shape of the tail flags; females differ in the pattern of green spots on their white throat and belly. These differences are:

- O. u. polystictus (male) bluish black oval flags, (female) heavily spotted
- O. u. discifer (male) bluish to turquoise-black oval flags, (female) medium density of fine spots
- O. u. underwoodii (male) bluish to turquoise-black oval flags, (female) medium spotted
- O. u. incommodus (male) bluish black oval flags, (female) medium to scarcely spotted
- O. u. melanantherus (male) bluish black oval to round flags, (female) unspotted

== Distribution and habitat ==
The subspecies of white-booted racket-tail are found thus:

- O. u. polystictus, the Venezuelan Coastal Range between Carabobo and Miranda states
- O. u. discifer, northwestern Venezuela and adjoining northern Colombia
- O. u. underwoodii, Colombia's Eastern Andes
- O. u. incommodus, Colombia's Central and Western Andes
- O. u. melanantherus, the Andean Pacific slope from Colombia's Nariño Department to southwestern Ecuador

The white-booted racket-tail inhabits the temperate and subtropical Andes. It favors the edges of humid to wet forest but is also found in the forest interior and in more open secondary forest. It is most numerous at elevations between 1,600 and 2,200 m (5,200 and 7,200 ft) but is found as low as 600 m (2,000 ft) and as high as 4,000 m (13,000 ft).

== Behavior ==
=== Movement ===
The white-booted racket-tail makes seasonal elevational movements after breeding.

=== Feeding ===
The white-booted racket-tail typically forages between 6 and 18 m (20 and 60 ft) above the ground. It takes nectar from a variety of plants such as those of genera Palicourea, Clusia, Inga, and Cavendishia. Often several birds will feed close together. In addition to feeding on nectar it captures small insects by hawking from a perch.

=== Breeding ===
The white-booted racket-tail breeds at least between January and April in Colombia but probably breeds at any time during the year. It makes a tiny cup nest of plant fiber and lichen, typically on a horizontal twig 6 to 8 m (20 to 30 ft) above the ground. The female incubates the clutch of two eggs for 16 to 17 days; fledging occurs 19 to 22 days after hatching.

=== Vocalization ===
Both male and female white-booted racket-tails give "a diagnostic, descending, thin sweet trill, 'ti-tlee-ee-ee' [and] single 'tsit' and 'trrt' notes."

== Status ==
The IUCN follows HBW taxonomy and so recognizes only one species of Ocreatus as the booted racket-tail. It has assessed the species as being of Least Concern. It has a large range, and though its population size is not known it is believed to be stable. No immediate threats are known. It is a very common species and occurs in several protected areas.
