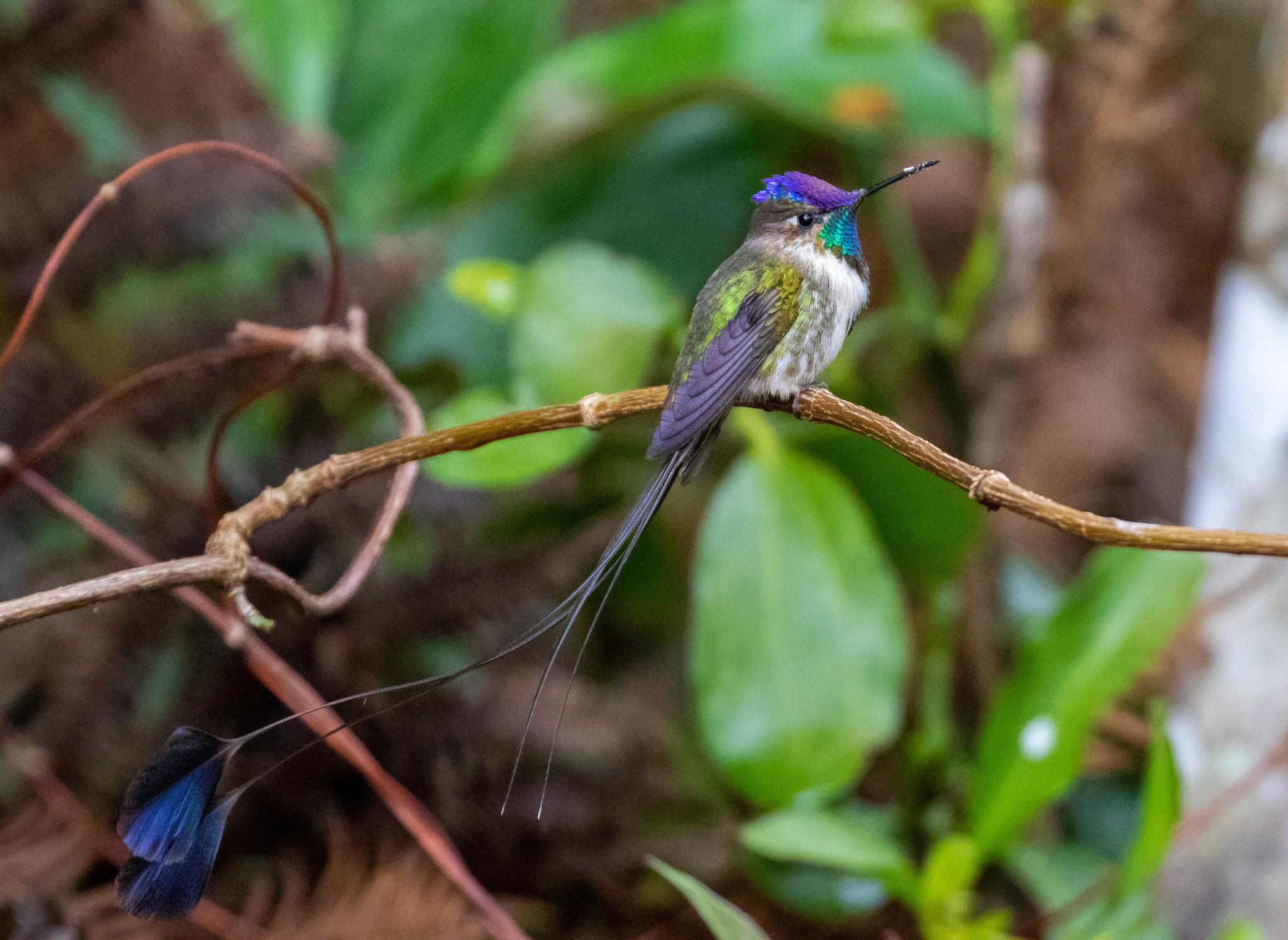
- Male
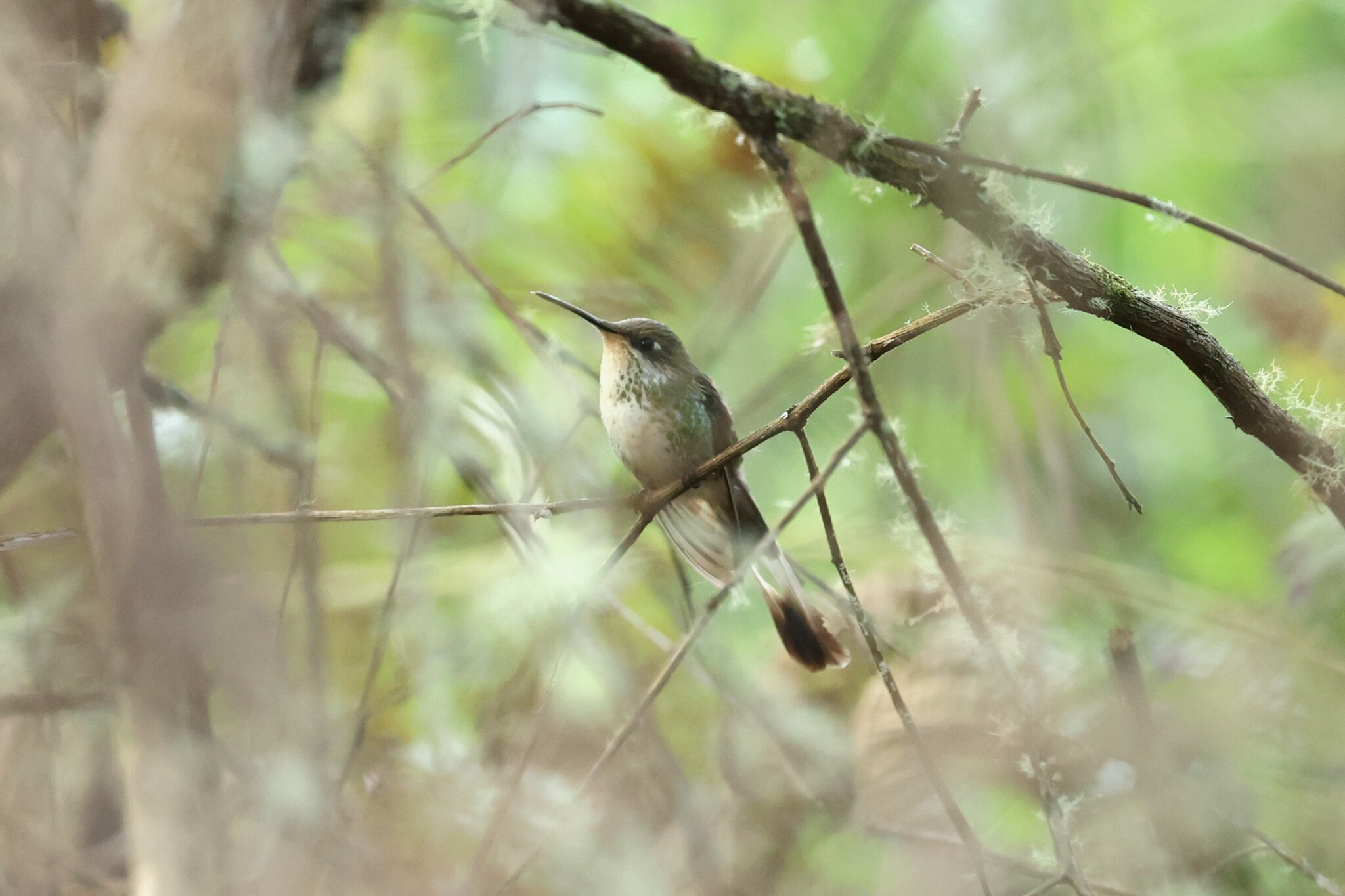
- Female

Conservation status
- Near Threatened (IUCN 3.1)
- CITES Appendix II

Scientific classification
- Kingdom: Animalia
- Phylum: Chordata
- Class: Aves
- Clade: Strisores
- Order: Apodiformes
- Family: Trochilidae
- Tribe: Heliantheini
- Genus: Loddigesia; Bonaparte, 1850
- Species: L. mirabilis

Binomial name
- Loddigesia mirabilis (Bourcier, 1847)
- Distribution of Loddigesia mirabilis in Peru

= Marvelous spatuletail =

Species of hummingbird

The marvelous spatuletail (Loddigesia mirabilis) is an endangered species of hummingbird in the "brilliants", tribe Heliantheini in subfamily Lesbiinae. It is endemic to northern Peru.

== Taxonomy and systematics ==
The marvelous spatuletail is currently (early 2022) treated by worldwide taxonomic systems as the only member of its genus. However, a molecular phylogenetic study of the hummingbirds published in 2014 found that the marvelous spatuletail was embedded in genus Eriocnemis, the "pufflegs". Moving it to Eriocnemis would require that the colorful puffleg (currently E. mirabilis) receive a new specific epithet because the spatuletail's mirabilis has priority.

== Description ==
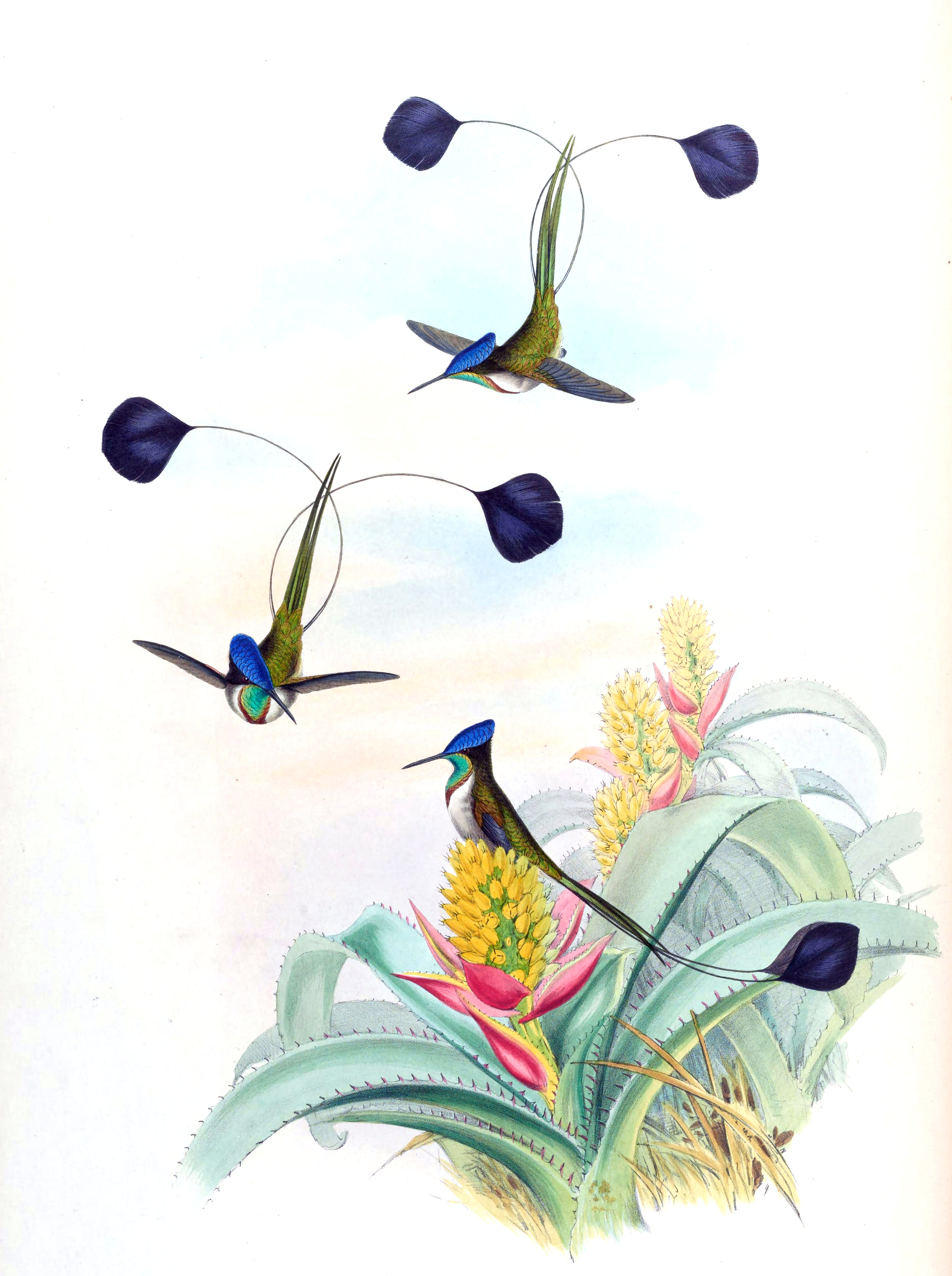
Illustration of three males by John Gould

The male marvelous spatuletail is 15 to 17 cm (5.9 to 6.7 in) long including its 11 to 13 cm (4.3 to 5.1 in) tail. Females are 9 to 10 cm (3.5 to 3.9 in) long with a 5 to 7 cm (2.0 to 2.8 in) tail. The male's signature feature is its two outer tail feathers with bare shafts that cross each other and end in large purplish black racquets or "spatules". The remaining tail feathers are very short and are supported by two long undertail coverts. The female's outer tail feathers are also long, but shorter than the male's, and do not have the racquets.

Both sexes have a slightly decurved black bill and a white spot behind the eye. Males have mostly green upperparts with a blue crest and a brownish hindneck. Their gorget is glossy blue-green and the rest of the underparts are white with a black line down the center. Females are also green above but do not have a crest or gorget. Their underparts are white without the male's black central line.

== Distribution and habitat ==
The marvelous spatuletail is found only in a small area in the Andes of northern Peru. Most records are from the valley of the Utcubamba River in Amazonas Department with a few further east in the Department of San Martín. It inhabits the edges of mature forest, secondary forest, and montane scrublands. It is partial to thickets of thorny Rubus with alder (Alnus). In elevation it ranges between 2,100 and 2,900 m (6,900 and 9,500 ft) though there are unconfirmed reports both higher and lower.

== Behavior ==
=== Movement ===
The marvelous spatuletail is a year-round resident of its range.

=== Feeding ===
The marvelous spatuletail forages by trap-lining, visiting a circuit of flowering plants where it perches to feed. It is most often seen feeding at a red-flowered lily (Bomarea formosissima) but has been observed feeding in at least five other species of flowering plants. It is dominated by other hummingbird species that share its range.

=== Breeding ===
Little is known about the marvelous spatuletail's breeding phenology. Its breeding season appears to be between December and February but may extend from October to May. Males gather at leks and perform an aerial display.

=== Vocalization ===
The male marvelous spatuletail gives "a repeated high-pitched buzzy metallic note...'tzzz...tzzz...'" during its aerial display. Its calls include "an upslurred high-pitched sweet note 'tswee'" and "a more strident 'tsik'".

== Status ==
The IUCN originally assessed the marvelous spatuletail as Threatened, then in 1994 rated it as Vulnerable, in 2000 as Endangered, then moved it down to Near Threatened in 2023. It is known from only two general areas and its population is thought to be smaller than 1000 mature individuals. Deforestation is rampant in its range though the species' preference for edge and scrubby habitats may somewhat ameliorate its effects. Males are hunted for traditional medicine, as their hearts are believed to be an aphrodisiac.

In 2005, American Bird Conservancy provided Peruvian conservation partner ECOAN with support to sign a conservation easement with the Pomacochas Community to protect and manage about 100 acres (0.40 km^{2}) of significant habitat for the marvelous spatuletail. Over 30,000 saplings of native trees and bushes have been planted there. This conservation easement is the first of its kind in Peru.

== In popular media ==
The marvelous spatuletail has been featured on the PBS TV series Nature and three BBC TV series, Natural World, Life and The Americas (Season 1, Episode 7).

== See also ==
- Booted racket-tails (Ocreatus) - a more widespread genus of Andean hummingbirds with a similar but shorter tail
