= Bellavista Cloud Forest Reserve =

Conservation area in Ecuador

Coordinates: 0°0′57″S 78°40′53″W

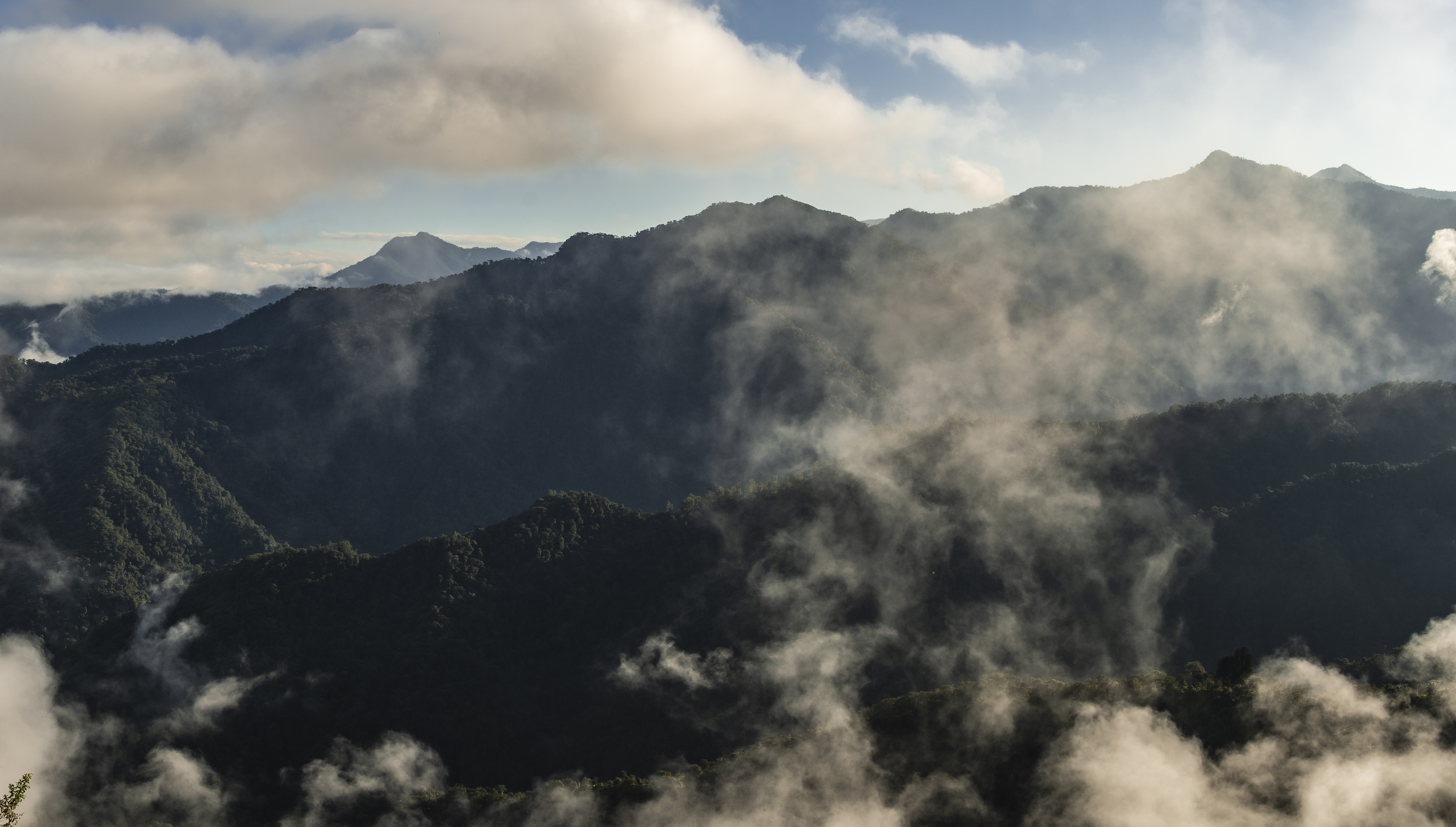
Bellavista Cloud Forest, Ecuador

The Bellavista Cloud Forest Reserve is a 2,000-acre (8.1 km^{2}) certified conservation area on the North-Western slopes of the Andean mountain range and is located 52 km from the Ecuadorian capital city of Quito. The lodge itself comprises guest rooms, 10 km of walking trails and the four storey geodesic dome, which contains a restaurant, viewing platforms and further accommodation. The Reserve was first established in 1991 by a British/Colombian couple. The area won the Audubon Christmas Bird Count for the Americas in 2006, 2007, and 2008.

== History ==
In 1991 the Bellavista Cloud Forest Reserve was first founded by British/Colombian couple Richard and Gloria Parsons, with the purchase of a 136-acre (0.55 km^{2}) area of cloud forest in the Tandayapa Valley region. Over the 19-year period since its purchase, the reserve has been added to with further purchases of land for conservation, expanding the reserve to 2,000 acres (8.1 km^{2}).

In 1991 construction on the Eco-lodge began, starting with the central geodesic dome, designed by local architects and Richard Parsons. This proved to be difficult in construction due to the carefully measured glass panels and precise wood fittings required. Guesthouses have also been added to the reserve, examples being the 'German House', 'Trailhead House' and 'Glorias' Honeymoon House'.

During its time as a functioning lodge the Bellavista Cloud Forest Reserve has been officially certified through Rainforest Alliance and Smart Voyager as an Eco-lodge. The Bellavista Reserve is also a founding member of the Network of Private Protected Forests of Ecuador

== Geography ==
The Bellavista Cloud Forest Reserve is located entirely within the Pichincha Province of Ecuador, and is itself located on the North-Western slopes of the Andean mountain range, situated at 2,000 metres (6,600 ft) altitude. It is located approximately 52 km (32 mi) from Quito, the central plaza of which is at 2,800 metres (9,200 ft) altitude. Bellavista Cloud Forest Reserve is in the northern section of the Andes which runs through Venezuela, Colombia, and Ecuador and consists of two parallel ranges, the Cordillera Occidental and the Cordillera Oriental.

== Wildlife and ecosystem ==
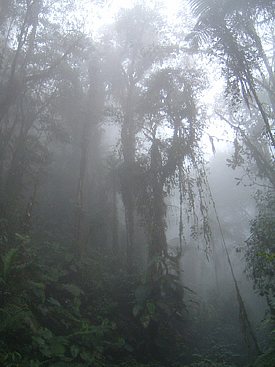
The cloud forest environment of the Bellavista Reserve

The cloud forests of Ecuador, also termed the pre-montane/subtropical rainforests, cover the slopes of the Andean mountains from about 900 metres (3,000 ft) to about 2,500 metres (8,200 ft). They are forests of high biodiversity, with a variety of little-studied wildlife and plants. The cloud forest is a cool and humid environment with frequent canopy level cloud cover.

The Bellavista Reserve is situated at the southern edge of the Chocó/Andean biodiversity hotspot areas which stretch from south western Colombia to northwestern Ecuador. The existence of the hotspots lead to the Bellavista Reserve being declared part of the Mindo Area of International Importance for Birds, the first area so designated in South America, by Birdlife International in 1997.

The New York Botanical Gardens wrote that the diversity of epiphytes ("air plants" that grow on other plants) is higher in the cloud forests of Ecuador, Colombia and Peru than anywhere else on the planet.

Many orchid species are also found in the Bellavista Reserve. Orchids produce elegant shapes and many species are highly fragranced and the coloured. Orchids belong to the famous family Orchidaceae. These plants grow in both east and west tropical and subtropical zones of Ecuador, and only a very few are able to grow in mild or cold zones. The majority of orchids live on trees, as epiphytes, where they can comfortably receive heat, light and moist tropical air; others prefer rocks semi covered with moss, and other orchids grow only at ground level, as they grow under a tree's shade. Within Ecuador 4200 species of orchid have been found, this is more than 10% of all orchid species worldwide.

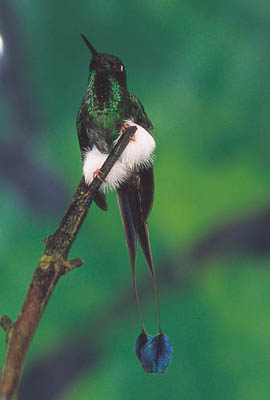
A white-booted racket-tail hummingbird at the Bellavista Reserve

The Bellavista Reserve is home to a huge variety of bird species. Hummingbirds are seen particularly often in and around the reserve, with sighted species including the lesser violetear, buff-tailed coronet, sparkling violetear, gorgeted sunangel, Andean emerald, purple-bibbed whitetip, speckled hummingbird, white-booted racket-tail, violet-tailed sylph and purple-throated woodstar. Species such as the tanager-finch, giant antpitta, swallow-tailed nightjar, plush-capped finch, beautiful jay, and white-faced nunbird are also seen, as well as the plate-billed mountain-toucan and toucan barbet. The Andean cock-of-the-rock is also frequently spotted at the nearby lek, where the males and females gather to breed.

Mammals seen in the reserve area include the endangered spectacled bear, as well as the puma, Andean coati and tayra.

== Current research and conservation projects ==
The Bellavista Cloud Forest Reserve has its own research station available for students and scientists to study all aspects of the cloud forest ecosystem. The Bellavista Reserve is currently used as an active research base for the Payamino Project, which was initiated in 2002, through a partnership between San Jose de Payamino (an Indigenous community in the Ecuadorian Amazon), Zoos Go Wild and Aalborg Zoo, in order to protect the wildlife and culture of the area. The project is supported by a number of high-profile universities, including Glasgow and Manchester in the UK and Aarhus and Aalborg in Denmark. These universities run expeditions and field courses and also have post-graduate students carrying out research. The number of studies taking place in the area has grown recently to now cover the birds, reptiles, amphibians, insects and mammals of the Payamino area. Ornithological surveys have been conducted in the area since 2000 and have so far registered more than 260 bird species. To date, amphibian surveys have revealed that the area has at least 60 native species of frog. The Chairman of the project is Dr Richard Preziosi of The University of Manchester.
