= Green violetear =

The green violetear has been split into the following species:

- Mexican violetear, Colibri thalassinus
- Lesser violetear, Colibri cyanotus
