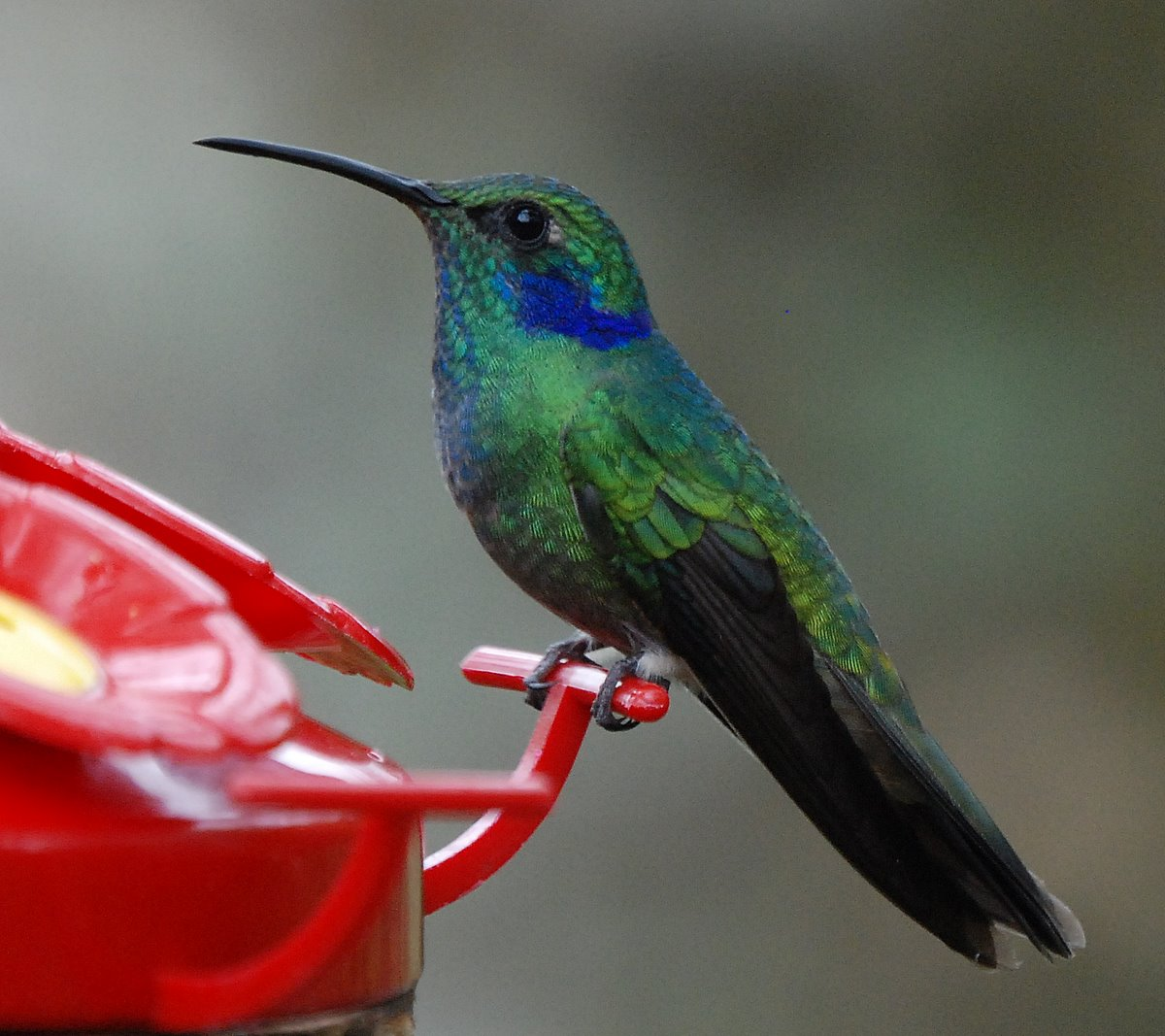

Conservation status
- Least Concern (IUCN 3.1)
- CITES Appendix II

Scientific classification
- Kingdom: Animalia
- Phylum: Chordata
- Class: Aves
- Order: Apodiformes
- Family: Trochilidae
- Genus: Colibri
- Species: C. thalassinus

Binomial name
- Colibri thalassinus (Swainson, 1827)

= Mexican violetear =

Species of bird

The Mexican violetear (Colibri thalassinus) is a medium-sized, metallic green hummingbird species commonly found in forested areas from Mexico to Nicaragua. This species, together with the lesser violetear were previously considered conspecific, and together called the green violetear.

== Taxonomy ==
The Mexican violetear belongs to the order Apodiformes. Hummingbirds share this order with the swifts, such as the white-collared swift. The name Apodiformes is derived from the Greek words "a pous", meaning "without foot". While apodiforms do in fact have feet, they are quite small and their legs are short and relatively weak. Many birds in this order cannot walk, and thus rarely if ever land on the ground, where they are not well-adapted to forage or to escape from predators. Members of this order spend a majority of their active time in the air.

== Description ==
The Mexican violetear is roughly medium-sized by hummingbird standards. It averages around 9.7 to 12 cm (3.8 to 4.7 in) in total length. Its bill is black and mostly straight with only a slight downward curve and measures from 1.8 to 2.5 cm (0.71 to 0.98 in). The body mass can vary from 4.8 to 5.6 g (0.17 to 0.20 oz). Among standard measurements, the wing chord is 5.8 to 6.8 cm (2.3 to 2.7 in) and the tail is 3.5 to 4.3 cm (1.4 to 1.7 in). The bird has a wingspan of 12 cm. It is shining green above with a glittering violet ear-patch on the sides of its neck. Its throat and chest are a glittering green with a shining green belly. The tail is a metallic blue-green with more bronzy central feathers and a prominent black subterminal band.

=== Vocalizations ===
Solitary males sing from above, exposed twigs in their territory every day. Their song is a monotonously repeated sharp and dry "tsu-tzeek" at a rate of about one call per second.

== Distribution and habitat ==
=== Distribution ===
The Mexican violetear breeds from the highlands of southern Mexico south to Nicaragua. It is a rare but annual nonbreeding visitor to the United States, primarily southern and central Texas, with scattered records as far north as extreme southern Canada. According to IUCN C. thalissinus can be found in much of montane areas of the northern Andes, stretching from Bolivia to Venezuela.

=== Habitat ===
Common habitats for the Mexican violetear is in the canopy and borders of subtropical and lower temperate forest, secondary woodland and scrub, and clearings and gardens in the subtropical zone. It is recorded mostly between altitudes of 1,200 to 2,300 m (3,900 to 7,500 ft), though they will sometimes wander as far down as 500 m (1,600 ft) in search of food sources. It generally prefers more humid and high-altitude areas, such as cloud forests.

=== Diet ===
The Mexican violetear forages alone but tends to gather at flowering trees, especially coffee-shade Inga. They feed at mid-level to canopy and often hold and defend a feeding territory. They primarily feed on nectar and small insects. They are a fairly common species that thrives in deforested areas.

=== Breeding ===
Like most hummingbirds, the Mexican violetear is a solitary nester. The male's only involvement in the breeding process is to attract and mate with the female. The female is then responsible for choosing a nest location, generally on a low, small horizontal branch in a protected area. The nest is small and built from various plant materials, spider webs, and down woven together to form a sturdy cup structure. Two small white eggs are laid within the nest and the female incubates them on her own. Incubation time is 14–18 days. Hatchlings are primarily fed insects due to high nutritional requirements. No information was found on the length of the nestling stage or age at fledgling. Breeding takes place though the wet season into the early dry season, which varies by latitude.

=== Migration ===
Seasonal movements of the Mexican violetear are not well understood. Many individuals of northern populations move south or and/or to lower elevations following the end of the breeding season (July to November in Mexico), but regular occurrence hundreds of kilometres north of this range suggests a more complex migration strategy.
