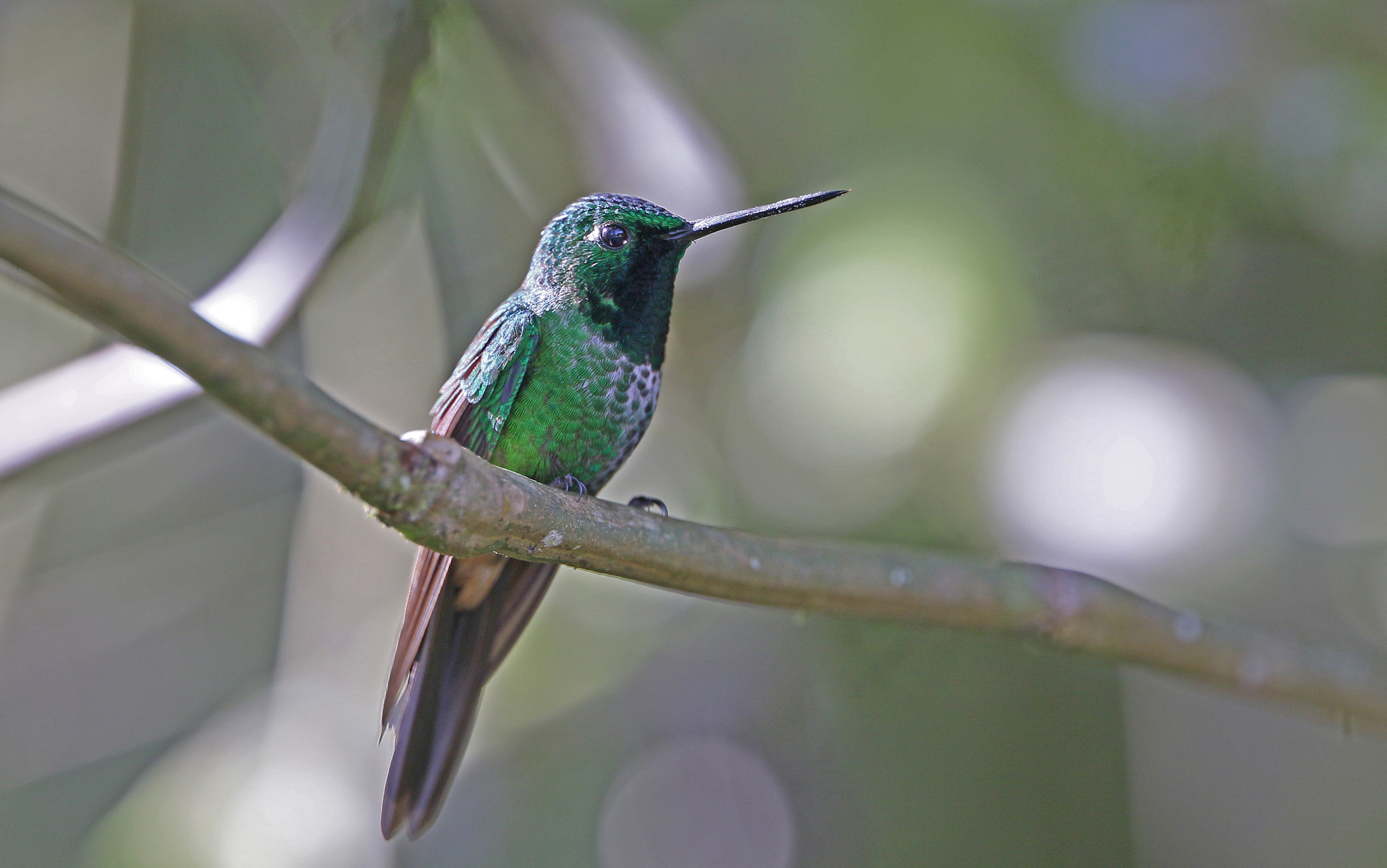

Conservation status
- Least Concern (IUCN 3.1)
- CITES Appendix II

Scientific classification
- Kingdom: Animalia
- Phylum: Chordata
- Class: Aves
- Order: Apodiformes
- Family: Trochilidae
- Genus: Urosticte
- Species: U. ruficrissa

Binomial name
- Urosticte ruficrissa Lawrence, 1864

= Rufous-vented whitetip =

Species of hummingbird

The rufous-vented whitetip (Urosticte ruficrissa) is a species of hummingbird in the "brilliants", tribe Heliantheini in subfamily Lesbiinae. It is found in Colombia, Ecuador and Peru.

== Taxonomy and systematics ==
The rufous-vented whitetip and purple-bibbed whitetip (Urosticte benjamini) have been treated as conspecific and as distinct species, each by multiple authors. Since the early 2000s there is consensus that they are species in their own right. They are the only members of their genus and both are monotypic.

== Description ==
The rufous-vented whitetip is 9 to 10 cm (3.5 to 3.9 in) long and weighs 4 to 4.2 g (0.14 to 0.15 oz). Both sexes have a medium-length straight black bill and a prominent white stripe behind the eye. Both have shining green upperparts and a forked tail, though the female's is not as deeply indented as the male's. Males have shining green underparts with buffy undertail coverts. The tail is dusky bronze; the central feathers have wide white tips. Females have white underparts spotted with green. The tail is dusky bronze with white tips on the outermost feathers. Juveniles are similar to females with the addition of brown edges on the head feathers.

== Distribution and habitat ==
The rufous-vented whitetip is found on the eastern slope of the Andes from Colombia's Huila and Nariño departments south through eastern Ecuador into Peru's Department of San Martín. It inhabits the interior and edges of partly open montane forest and cloudforest between elevations of 1,600 and 2,400 m (5,200 and 7,900 ft).

== Behavior ==
=== Movement ===
The rufous-vented whitetip is generally sedentary but locally moves to higher elevations after breeding.

=== Feeding ===
The rufous-vented whitetip mostly forages from near the ground to the forest's mid level. It collects nectar from a variety of flowering plants including bromeliads and members of genera Clusia and Palicourea. In addition to feeding on nectar it captures insects by hawking from a perch and sometimes by gleaning from vegetation.

=== Breeding ===
The rufous-vented whitetip's breeding season spans from January to April. It builds a cup nest of moss and typically places it in vines 2 to 4 m (7 to 10 ft) above the ground. The female incubates the clutch of two eggs for 15 to 18 days; fledging occurs 22 to 24 days after hatch.

=== Vocalization ===
The rufous-vented whitetip makes a "mellow, fast twittering 'tweetweetweetwee...'" that can sound like "a laughing chatter". While feeding in flight it also makes "a single lower-pitched scratchy note 'tzrrrrr'".

== Status ==
The IUCN has assessed the rufous-vented whitetip as being of Least Concern, though its population size is not known and believed to be decreasing. No immediate threats have been identified. It is generally uncommon throughout its restricted range. It occurs in several protected areas in Colombia but the Ecuadorean cloudforest is heavily logged.
