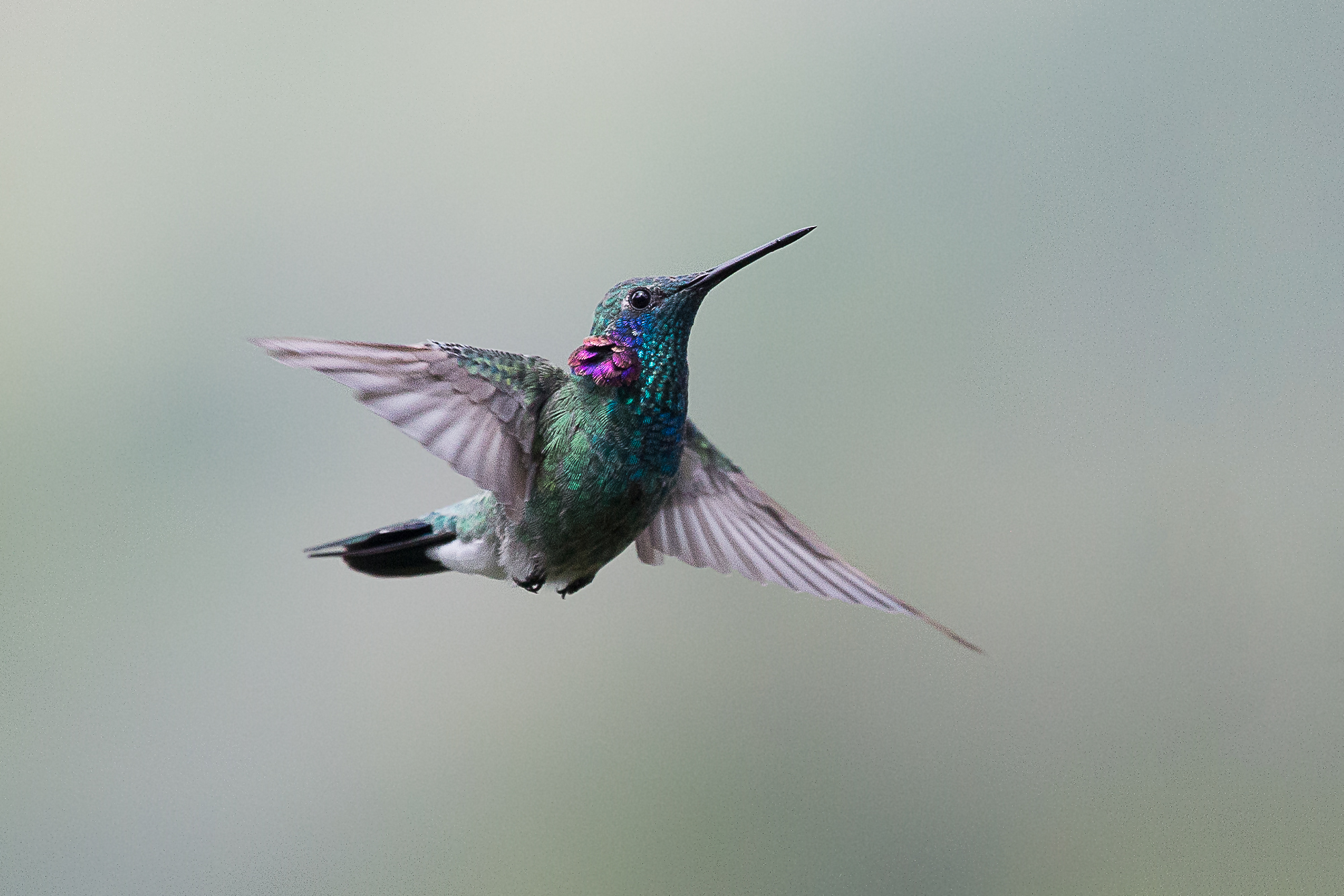

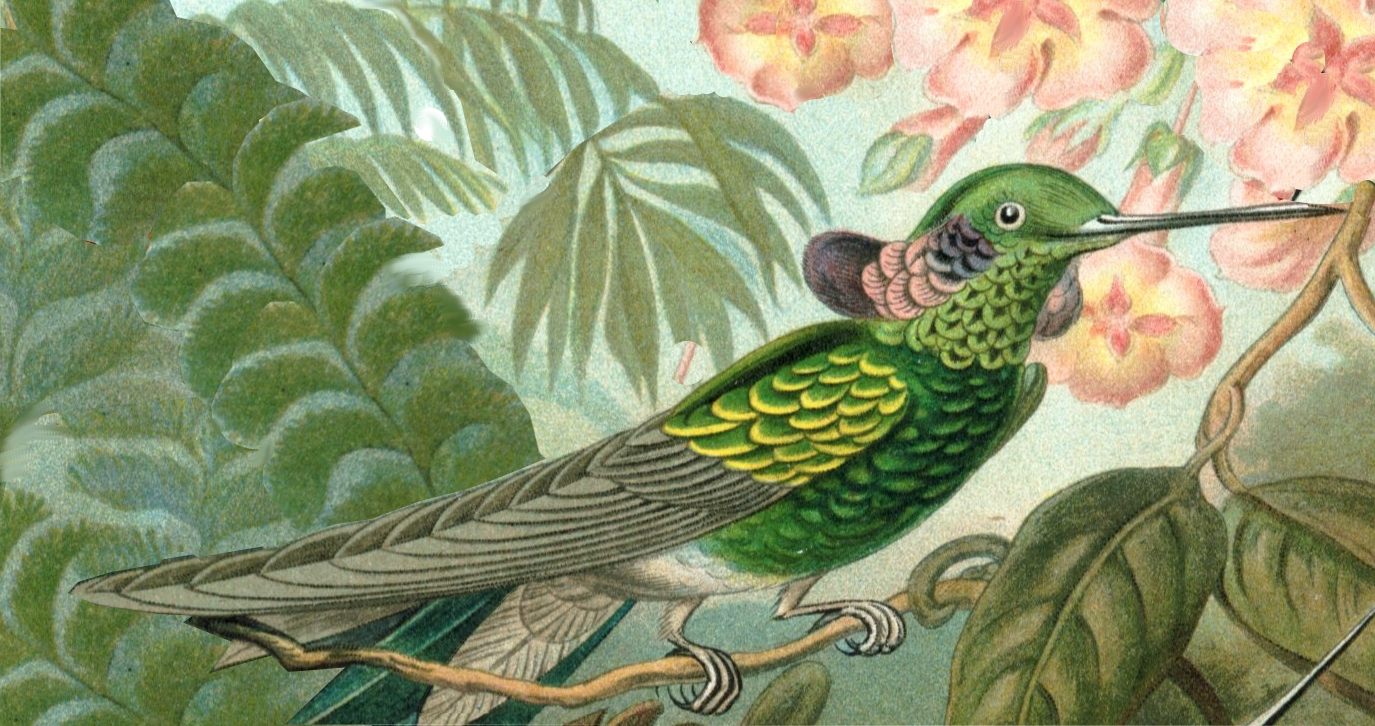

Conservation status
- Least Concern (IUCN 3.1)
- CITES Appendix II (CITES)

Scientific classification
- Kingdom: Animalia
- Phylum: Chordata
- Class: Aves
- Clade: Strisores
- Order: Apodiformes
- Family: Trochilidae
- Genus: Colibri
- Species: C. serrirostris

Binomial name
- Colibri serrirostris (Vieillot, 1816)
- Range of C. serrirostris

= White-vented violetear =

Species of hummingbird

The white-vented violetear (Colibri serrirostris) is a species of hummingbird in the subfamily Polytminae, the mangoes. It is found in Argentina, Bolivia, Brazil, and Paraguay. In April, 2024, one was also photographed at Batsu Gardens in Costa Rica.

== Taxonomy and systematics ==
The white-vented violetear is monotypic.

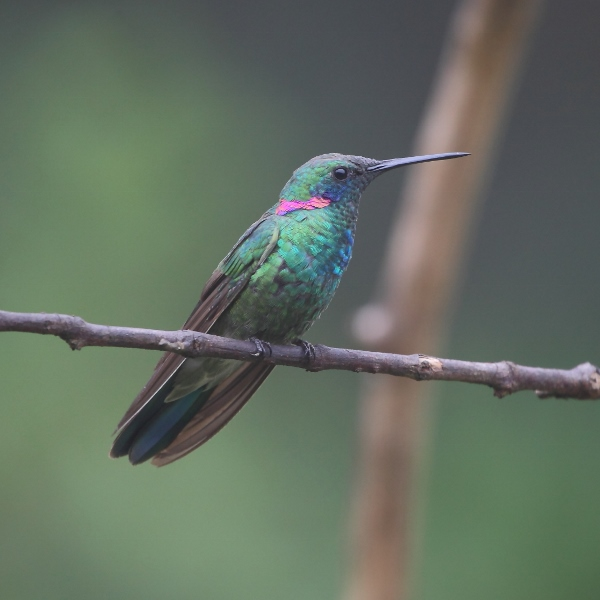
A male white-vented violetear at São Luiz do Paraitinga, São Paulo state, Brazil

== Description ==
The white-vented violetear is 12 to 13 cm (4.7 to 5.1 in) long and weighs 5.6 to 6.8 g (0.20 to 0.24 oz). The male is mostly shiny green, of a shade lighter than that of other violetears. Towards the rump it is yellow-green with a blue shimmer. The tail is glittering green with a wide steel-blue band near the end. The undertail coverts are pure white. The area behind the eye and covering the ears is violet blue. The female is similar to the male but paler and more grayish. The maxilla of both sexes is sometimes serrated, which provides its specific epithet.

== Distribution and habitat ==
The white-vented violetear is found in a wide swath of southern Brazil, from Mato Grosso east to Goiás, Bahia and Espírito Santo and south to Santa Catarina. Its range extends west into Bolivia, central Paraguay, and northern Argentina as far south as Córdoba Province. It inhabits a variety of semi-open landscapes including scrublands, savanna, grassland, and gardens and parks. In elevation it is most common between 1,000 and 1,500 m (3,300 and 4,900 ft) but its range begins at sea level and extends to 3,600 m (11,800 ft) in the Andes.

== Behavior ==
=== Movement ===
The white-vented violetear is mostly sedentary or nearly so; some populations make short migrations. Birds at elevations above treeline in Brazil are believed to move to lower elevations in fall.

=== Feeding ===
The white-vented violetear forages for nectar from a wide variety of flowering plants and trees. It also captures insects on the wing. It is very aggressive, calling from a perch and chasing other nectar-feeding birds and even butterflies from flower patches. It tends to begin feeding earlier in the day than other hummingbirds.

=== Breeding ===
The white-vented violetear's breeding seasons have not been fully defined, but in parts of Brazil it nests between September and March. The female alone builds the nest, incubates the eggs, and cares for the young. The nest is a cup made of fine fibers and spider silk and decorated with lichens on its outside. It is placed on a branch or in a vertical fork, typically about 1 m (3.3 ft) above the ground. The clutch size is two eggs. The incubation time is 15 to 16 days with fledging 22 to 25 days after hatch.

=== Vocalization ===
The white-vented violetear's song is "a constantly repeated 'tsilp, tsilp, zip, tsalp, tsalp'" that may continue for 25 minutes. Its principal call is "a hard 'drüg, drüg, drüg, drüg, drüg'".

== Status ==
The IUCN has assessed the white-vented violetear as being of Least Concern, though its population size and trend are not known. It has a large range, is common in most of it, and occurs in several protected areas.
