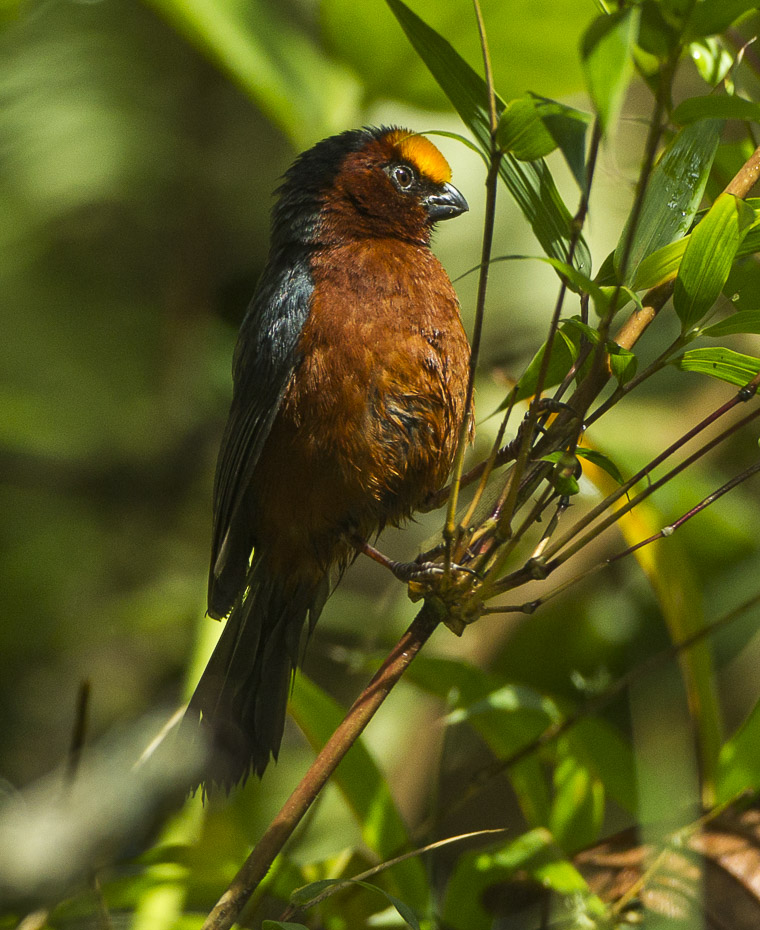

Conservation status
- Least Concern (IUCN 3.1)

Scientific classification
- Kingdom: Animalia
- Phylum: Chordata
- Class: Aves
- Order: Passeriformes
- Family: Thraupidae
- Genus: Catamblyrhynchus; Lafresnaye, 1842
- Species: C. diadema

Binomial name
- Catamblyrhynchus diadema Lafresnaye, 1842

= Plushcap =

Species of bird

The plushcap (Catamblyrhynchus diadema) is a species of bird in the tanager family Thraupidae and it is the only member of the genus Catamblyrhynchus.

The plushcap is one of the most distinctive of all Neotropical passerines in both its appearance and behavior. The plushcap was in its own family until recently when it was grouped with the tanagers. The bill is broad and black. The body is a chestnut color with a bright golden-yellow forecrown. The forecrown is made up of stiff feathers. It has been speculated that these short, dense feathers are less susceptible to feather wear and more resistant to moisture than typical feathers. This may be an adaptation for its specialized feeding mode, in which it probes into dense whorls of bamboo for its prey items. They are found at high elevations from northern Venezuela south to Argentina, including the coastal mountains of Venezuela and the Andes of Colombia, Ecuador, Peru, Bolivia, and extreme northwestern Argentina. They live in montane forests and secondary forests near bamboo. They forage for insects inside the bamboo. They will eat small insects, berries, and small plant matter.

The bird is very distinct and is not confused with many other birds. It stands out from the other tanagers, only possibly being confused with the golden-crowned tanager despite the golden-crowned tanager being blue. Its natural habitat is humid montane forests and it is always found in close association with Chusquea bamboo. It is typically found at elevations between 1,800 and 3,500 m (5,900–11,500 ft).

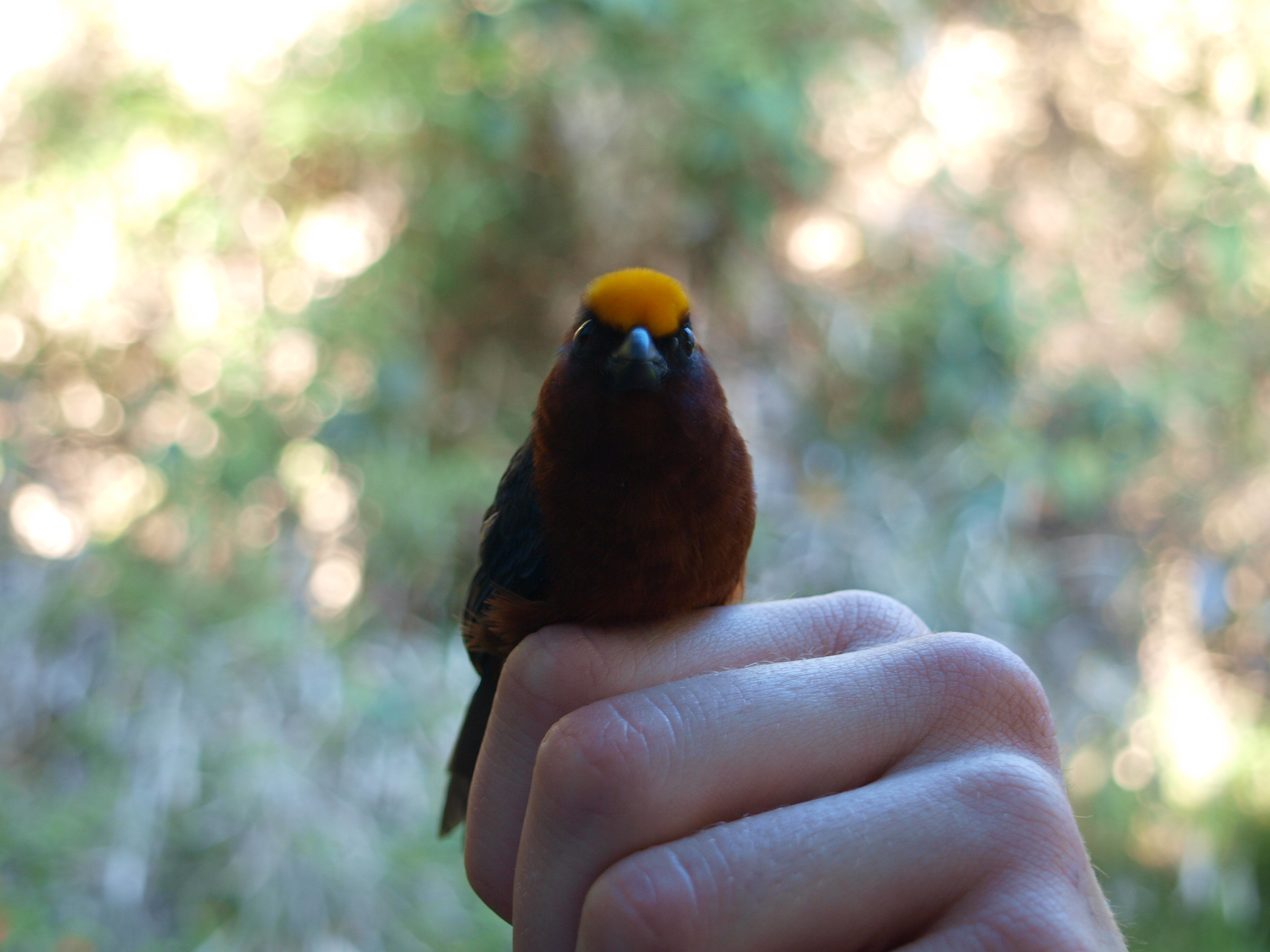
Front view of the plushcap taken in Bellavista

== Taxonomy ==
The plushcap was formally described in 1842 by the French ornithologist Frédéric de Lafresnaye from a specimen collected in Colombia. Lafresnaye introduced a new genus Catamblyrhynchus and coined the binomial name Catamblyrhynchus diadema. The genus name combines the Ancient Greek katambluoō meaning "to blunt" and rhunkhos meaning "bill". The specific epithet is from the Latin diadema which in turn comes from the Ancient Greek diadēma meaning "royal head-dress". The type locality is Bogotá in Colombia. The plushcap was at one time placed in the family Emberizidae but molecular phylogenetic studies have shown that it belongs in the tanager family Thraupidae.

Three subspecies are recognised:

- C. d. federalis Phelps & Phelps Jr, 1953 – north Venezuela
- C. d. diadema Lafresnaye, 1842 – north Colombia and northwest Venezuela to south Ecuador
- C. d. citrinifrons Berlepsch & Stolzmann, 1896 – Peru, Bolivia and northwest Argentina

== Description ==
The plushcap is about 14 cm (5.5 in) long and males weigh on average 14.9 g (0.53 oz) and females 13.4 g (0.47 oz). It has a chestnut body and a golden-yellow forecrown (the plush part of the name). From its nape to its wings, it is black. The males and females look similar but the males are slightly larger than the females. Juveniles are just duller versions of their parents.

The subspecies C. d. citrinifrons is found in Peru and has a paler cap while C. d. federalis is found in coastal Venezuela and is brighter than C. d. diadema.

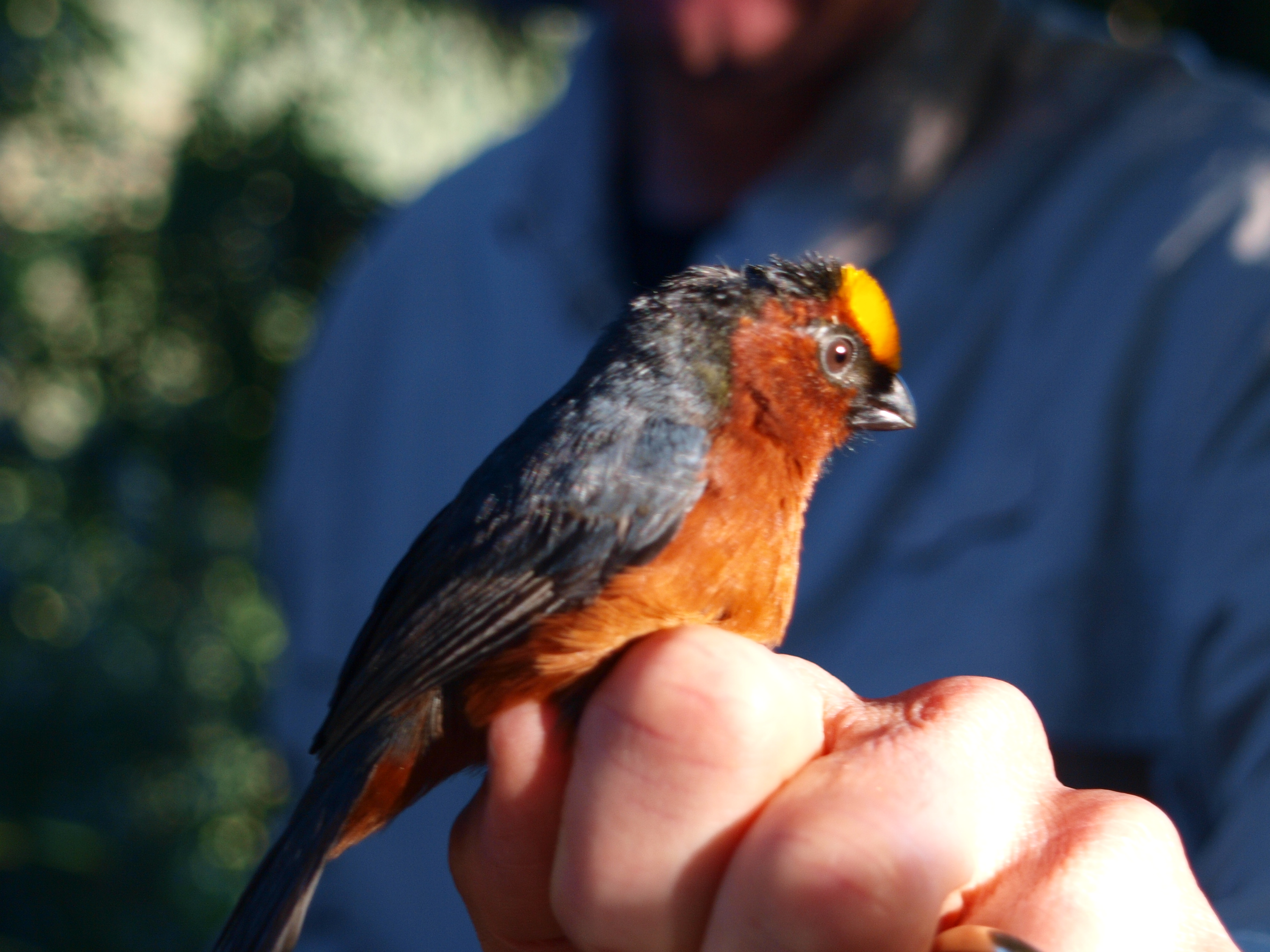
Plushcap in photo grip taken at Bellavista

=== Vocalizations ===
While the plushcap is usually quiet, when it does vocalize it has a long series of chirps and twitters.

== Distribution and habitat ==
Plushcaps prefer to live in montane forest or secondary woodland by Chusquea bamboo which they use to find food. They stay at high elevation, between 2,300–3,500 m (7,500–11,500 ft).

== Diet ==
The diet consists of small insects, berries, and plant material, and they typically forage in small groups within mixed species flocks of wide diversity. The plushcap looks for insects by probing and pushing its bill into the stems and leaf nodes of the bamboo and prying them open. They also forage by running their bill along the stems of bamboo with a series of tiny biting motions. Plushcaps will often hang upside down while searching for the insects.

== Conservation status ==
Plushcaps are considered of least concern due to their wide range in South America but it is thought that the number of individuals is declining. They tend to be common in their range.
