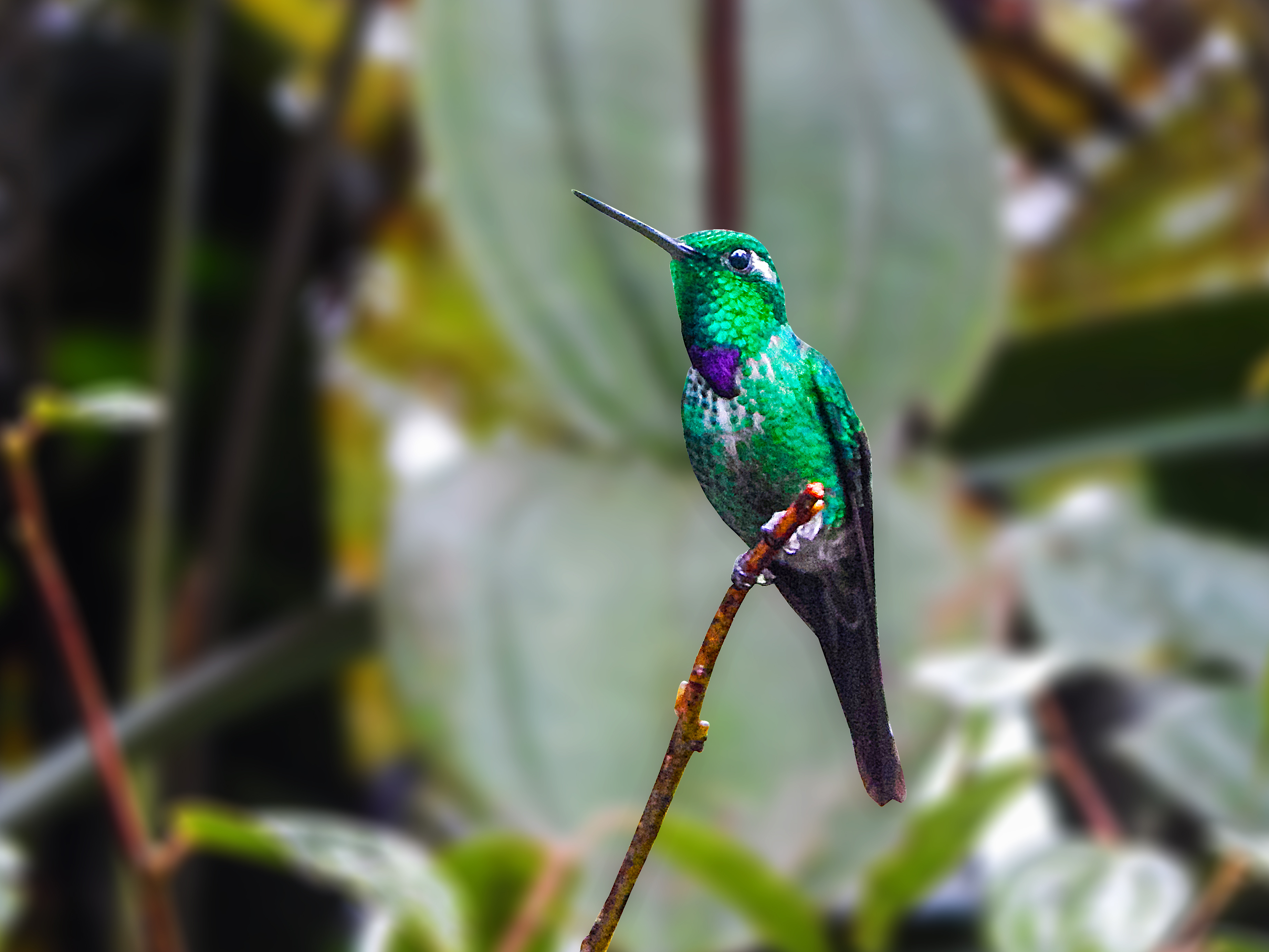
- Purple-bibbed whitetip, Urosticte benjamini

Scientific classification
- Kingdom: Animalia
- Phylum: Chordata
- Class: Aves
- Order: Apodiformes
- Family: Trochilidae
- Tribe: Heliantheini
- Genus: Urosticte; Gould, 1853

Species
- 2 (see text)

= Whitetip =

Genus of birds

The whitetips are a small group of hummingbirds in the genus Urosticte, which are restricted to humid forests growing on Andean slopes in north-western South America. Their common name, whitetips, refers to the conspicuous white tips on the central rectrices of the males. As the central rectrices are shorter than the outer, it appears as a large white spot on the central uppertail. Females, which have green-spotted white underparts, lack the white tips to the central rectrices, but instead have broad tips to the outer rectrices (white "tail-corners").

In this genus, the taxon intermedia has been considered a distinct species, or alternatively an intermediate between U. benjamini and U. ruficrissa, leading to these being considered conspecific. At present, intermedia is considered a variant and junior synonym of ruficrissa, resulting in two monotypic species being recognized:

== Species ==
The genus contains two species.

Genus Urosticte – Gould, 1853 – two species
Common name	Scientific name and subspecies	Range	Size and ecology	IUCN status and estimated population
Purple-bibbed whitetip Male Female	Urosticte benjamini (Bourcier, 1851)	Colombia and Ecuador	Size: Habitat: Diet:	LC
Rufous-vented whitetip	Urosticte ruficrissa Lawrence, 1864	Colombia, Ecuador and Peru.	Size: Habitat: Diet:	LC
