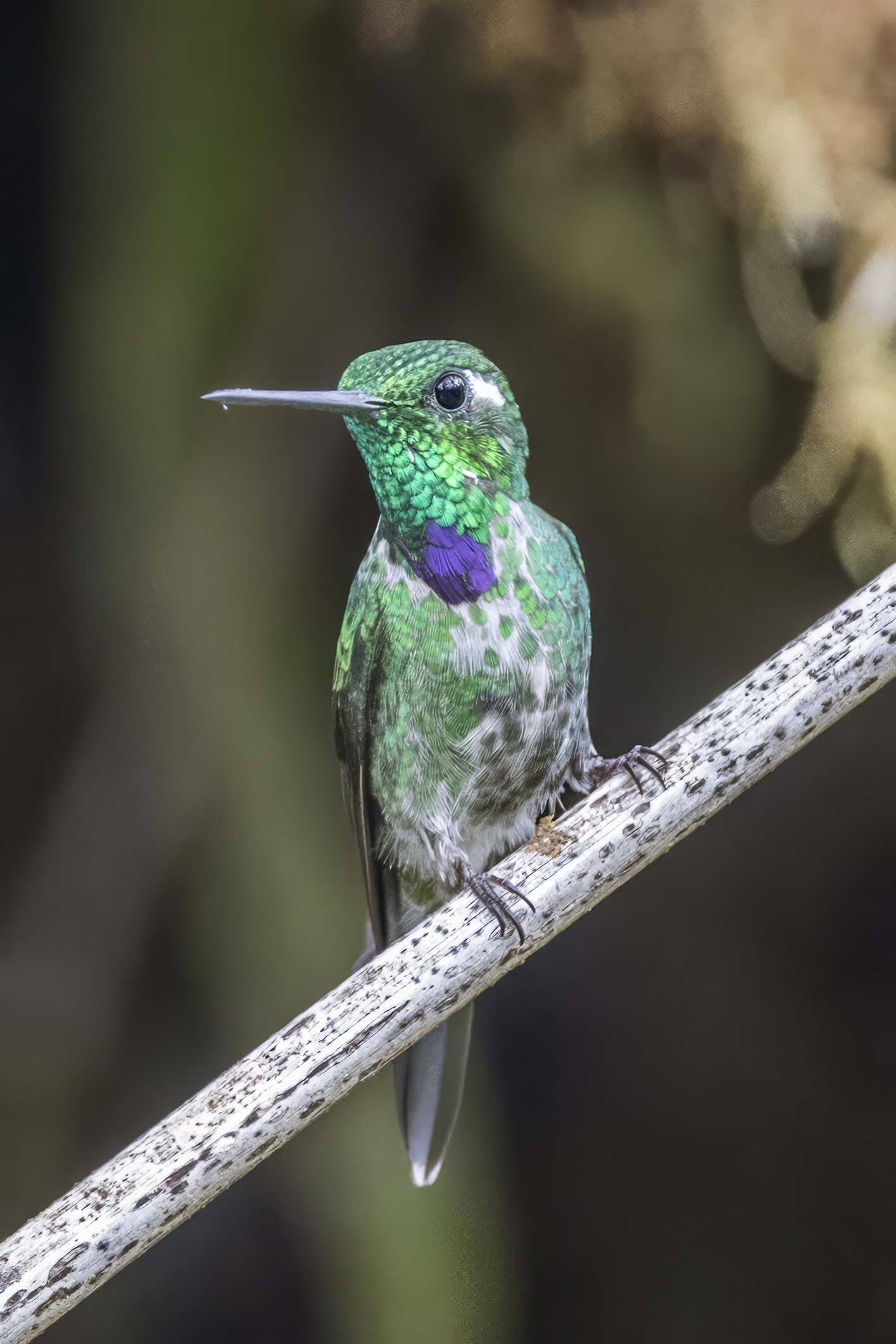
- Male in Colombia

Conservation status
- Least Concern (IUCN 3.1)
- CITES Appendix II (CITES)

Scientific classification
- Kingdom: Animalia
- Phylum: Chordata
- Class: Aves
- Clade: Strisores
- Order: Apodiformes
- Family: Trochilidae
- Genus: Urosticte
- Species: U. benjamini

Binomial name
- Urosticte benjamini (Bourcier, 1851)

= Purple-bibbed whitetip =

Species of hummingbird

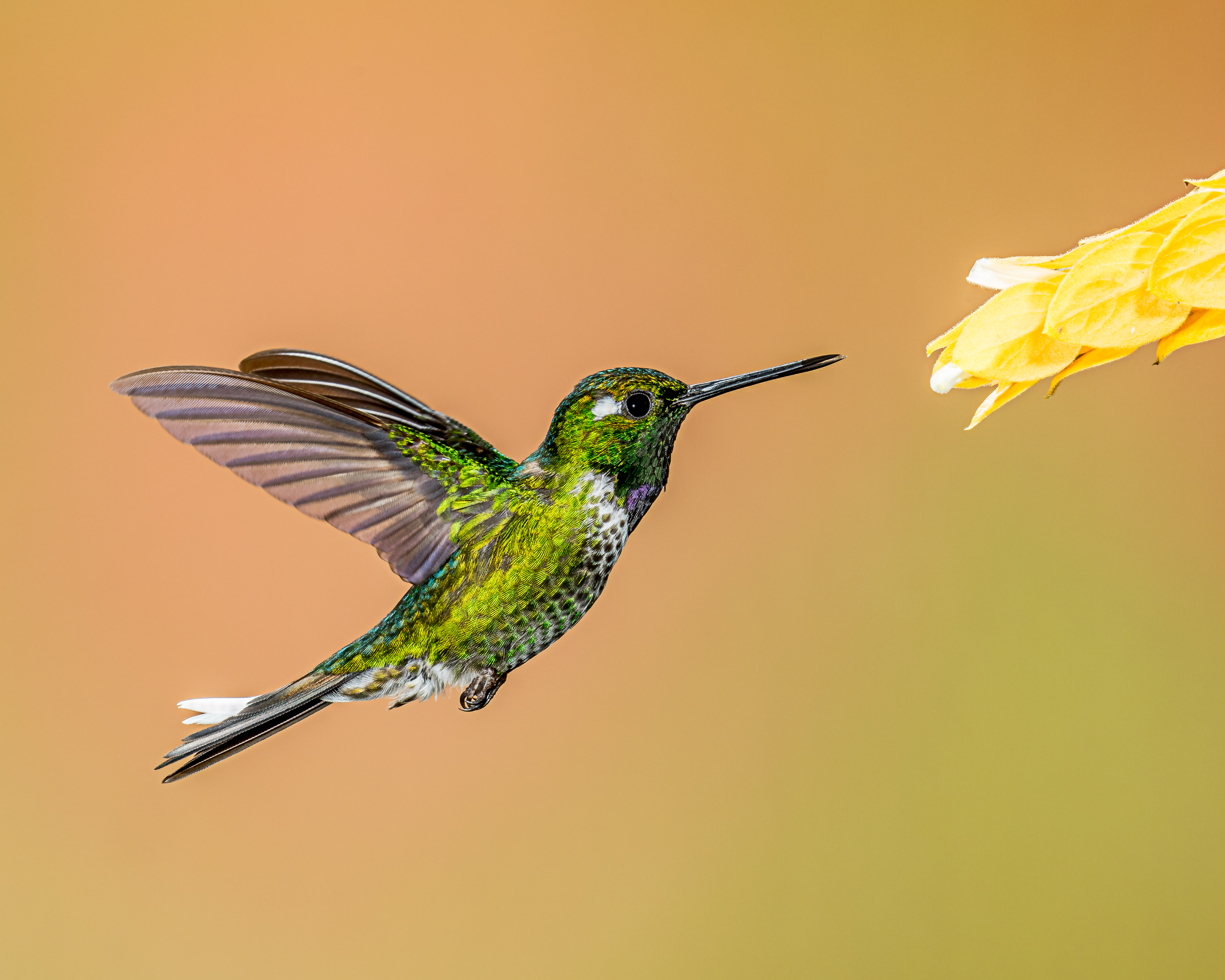
in flight in Ecuador

The purple-bibbed whitetip (Urosticte benjamini) is a species of hummingbird in the "brilliants", tribe Heliantheini in subfamily Lesbiinae. It is found in Colombia and Ecuador.

== Taxonomy and systematics ==
The purple-bibbed whitetip and rufous-vented whitetip (Urosticte ruficrissa) have been treated as conspecific and as distinct species, each by multiple authors. Since the early 2000s there is consensus that they are species in their own right. They are the only members of their genus and both are monotypic.

== Description ==
The purple-bibbed whitetip is 8 to 9 cm (3.1 to 3.5 in) long and weighs 3.8 to 4.2 g (0.13 to 0.15 oz). Both sexes have a medium-length straight black bill and a prominent white stripe behind the eye. Both have glittering green upperparts. Males have a violet lower throat white below it and a grayish belly with green spots. The tail is dusky bronze; the central feathers have wide white tips that appear as an oval spot. Females have white underparts heavily spotted with green. The tail is dusky bronze with purple near the end and white tips on the outer feathers. Juveniles are similar to females with the addition of brown edges on the head feathers.

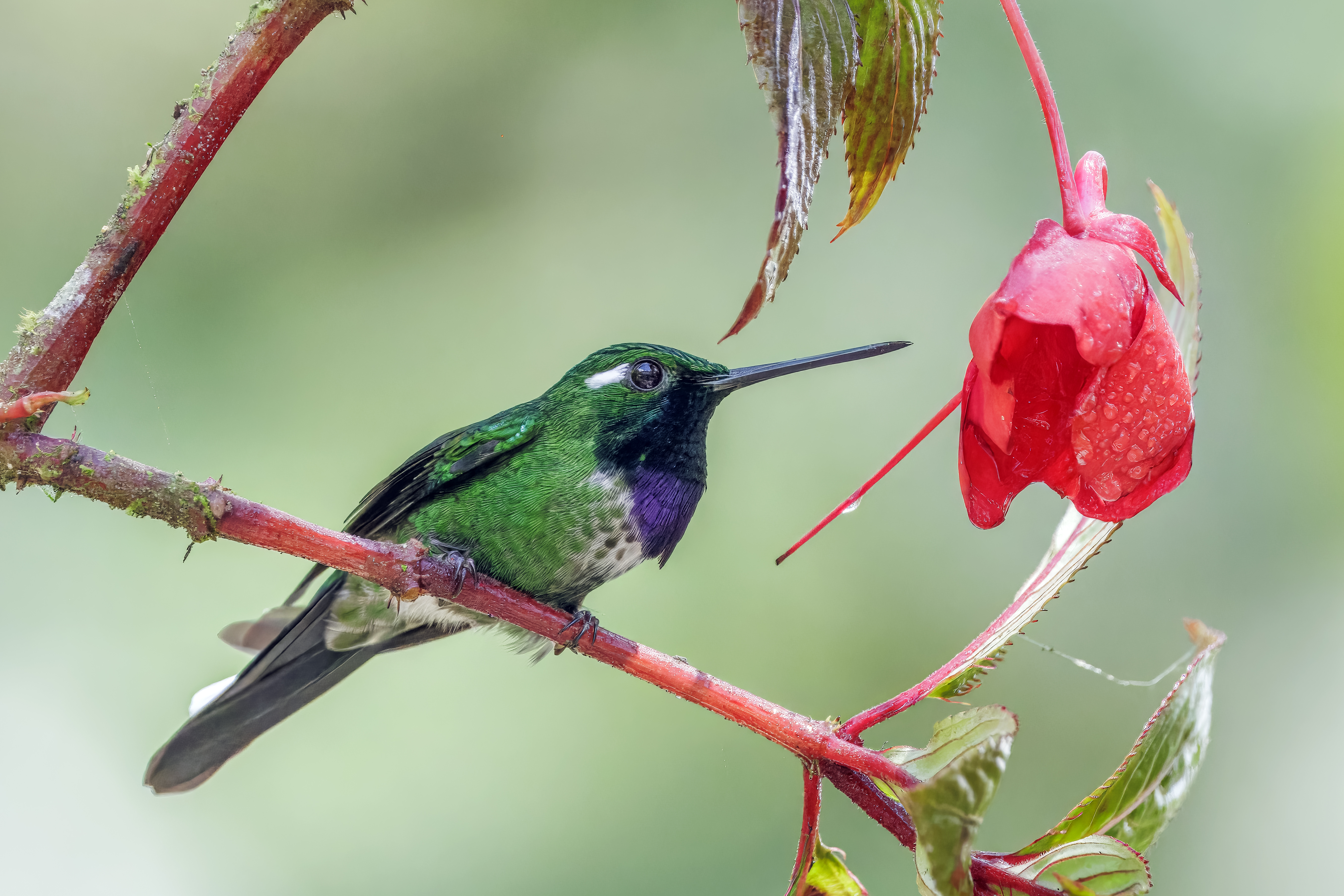
male, Ecuador

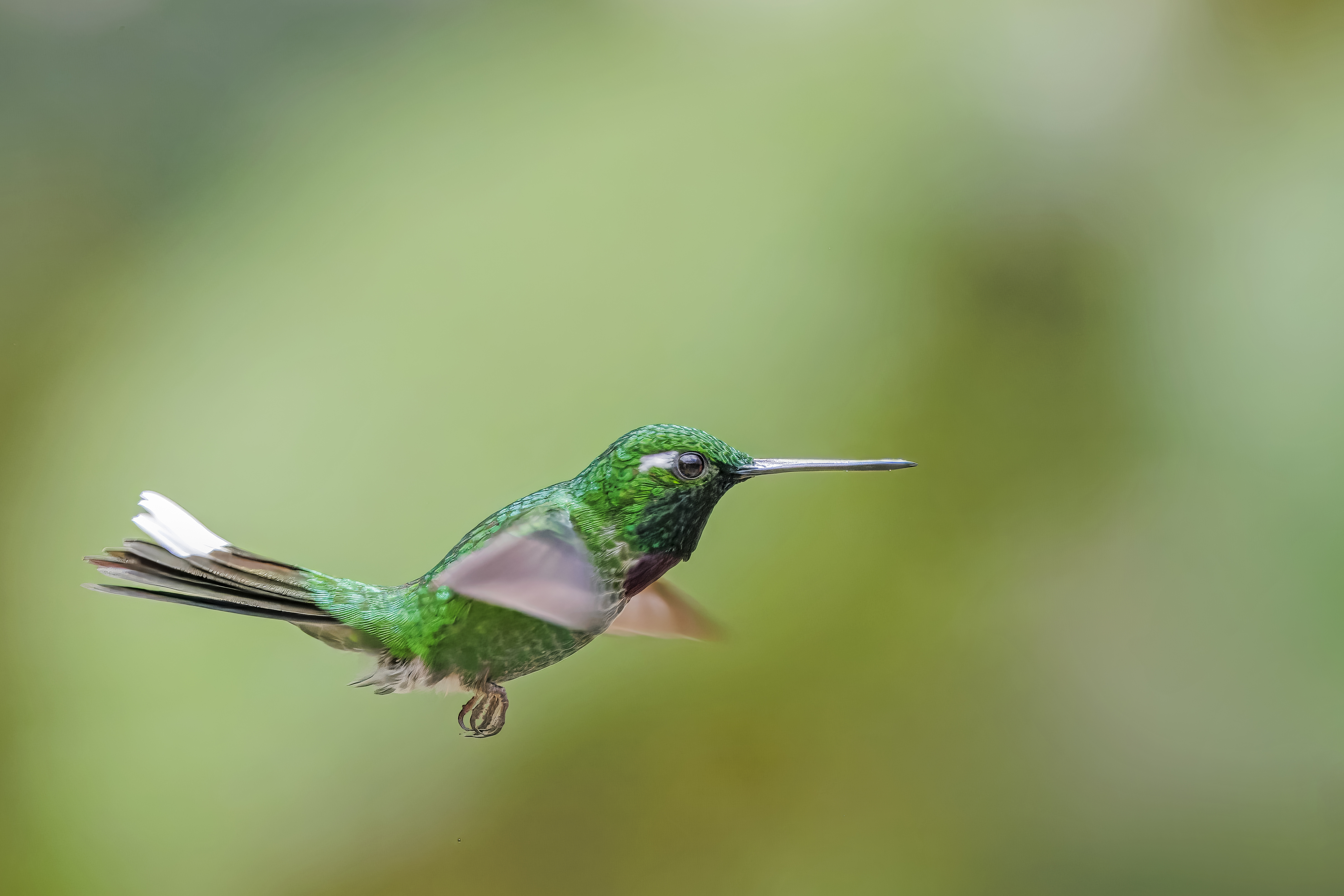
male, Ecuador

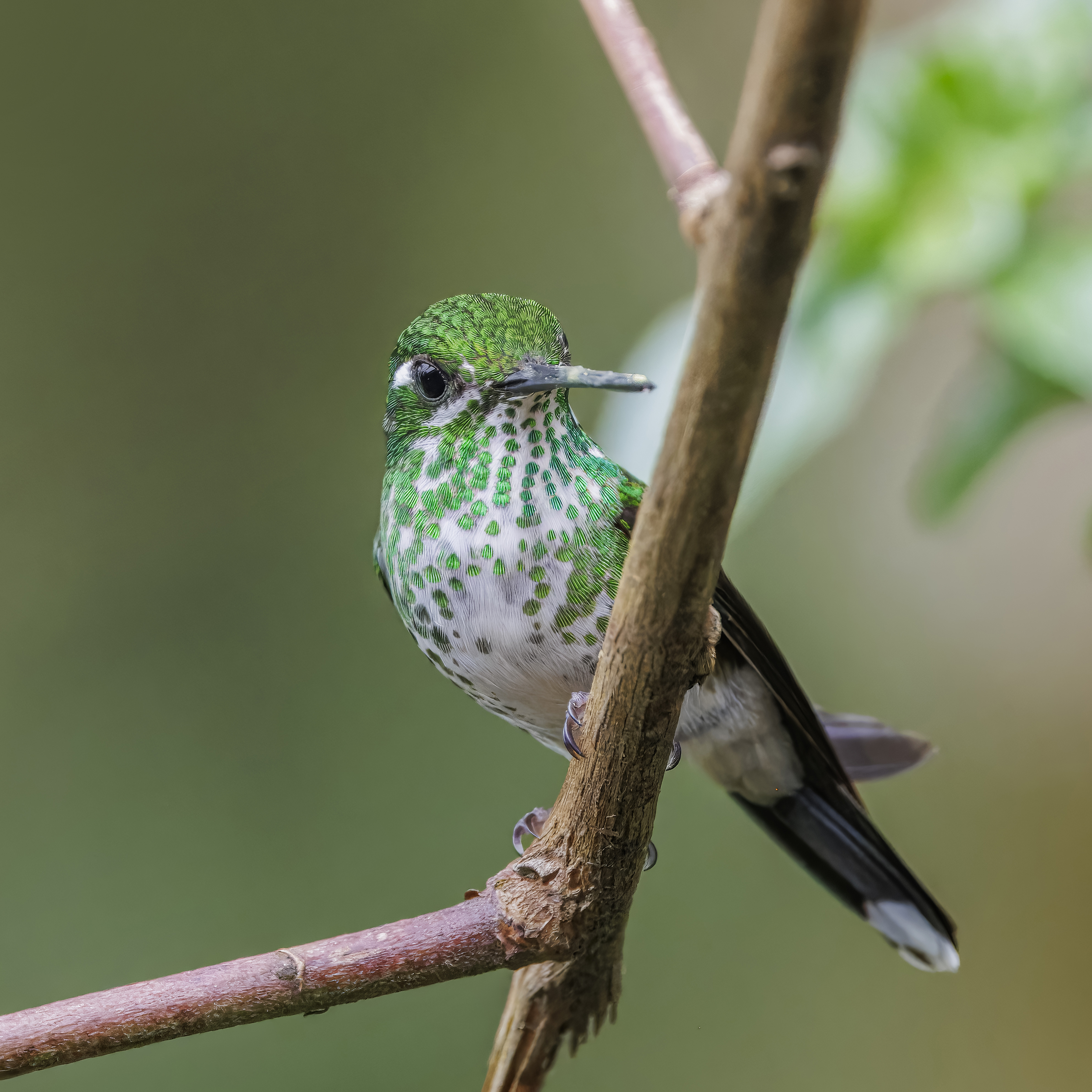
female, Ecuador

== Distribution and habitat ==
The purple-bibbed whitetip is found on the Pacific slope of the Andes from Colombia's Chocó Department south into Ecuador as far as Pichincha Province. It inhabits the interior and edges of montane forest, generally at elevations between 700 and 1,600 m (2,300 and 5,200 ft). In Ecuador it is most numerous between 1,200 and 1,400 m (3,900 and 4,600 ft).

== Behavior ==
=== Movement ===
The purple-bibbed whitetip is sedentary in Colombia but in Ecuador moves to lower elevations after breeding.

=== Feeding ===
The purple-bibbed whitetip mostly forages in the forest interior, from near the ground to below the canopy. It collects nectar from a variety of flowering plants including bromeliads and members of families Ericaceae, Fabaceae, and Rubiaceae. In addition to feeding on nectar it captures insects by gleaning from vegetation and hawking from a perch.

=== Breeding ===
The purple-bibbed whitetip's breeding season in Ecuador spans from January to April; it has not been defined in Colombia. It builds a cup nest from moss and ferns, and typically places it in a shrub or vines in a steep ravine about 2 to 4 m (7 to 10 ft) above the ground. The female incubates the clutch of two eggs for 16 to 18 days; the time to fledging is not known.

=== Vocalization ===
The purple-bibbed whitetip makes a "mellow, nasal-sounding fast twittering 'tweetweetweetwee...'" that can sound like "a laughing chatter". While feeding in flight it also makes "single lower-pitched scratchy notes, 'chrrrrr'". Another call is a "very high-pitched 'pseee'."

== Status ==
The IUCN has assessed the purple-bibbed whitetip as being of Least Concern, though its population size is not known and believed to be decreasing. No immediate threats have been identified. Though it has a restricted range, it is considered common, and occurs in some protected areas.
