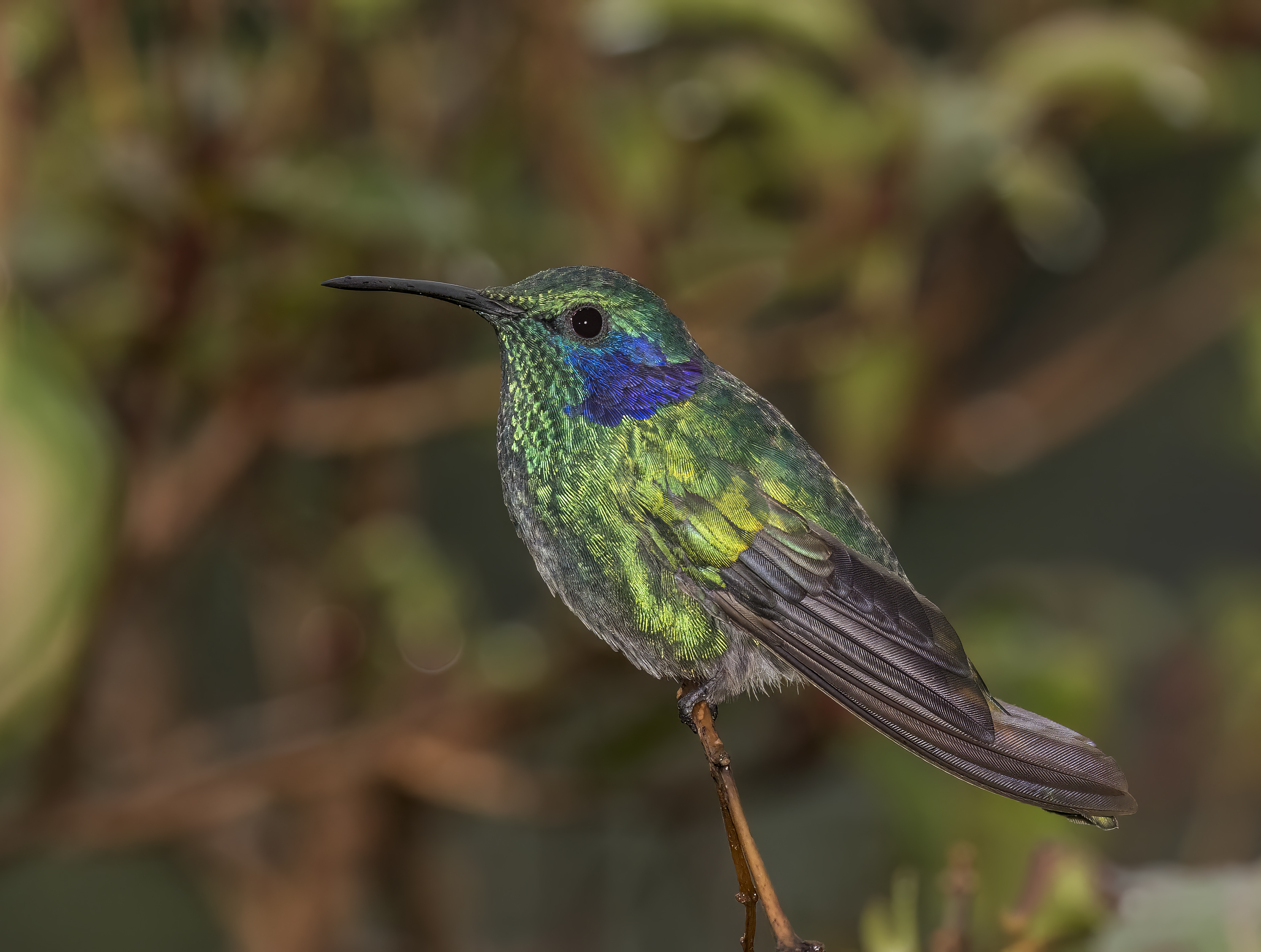
- C. c. cabanidis, Panama

Conservation status
- CITES Appendix II

Scientific classification
- Kingdom: Animalia
- Phylum: Chordata
- Class: Aves
- Order: Apodiformes
- Family: Trochilidae
- Genus: Colibri
- Species: C. cyanotus

Binomial name
- Colibri cyanotus (Bourcier, 1843)

Subspecies
- See text

= Lesser violetear =

Species of bird

The lesser violetear (Colibri cyanotus), also known as the mountain violet-ear, is a medium-sized, metallic green hummingbird species commonly found in forested areas from Costa Rica south to the Andes and Argentina and east to Venezuela. This species and the Mexican violetear were formerly considered as conspecific and named the 'green violetear'.

== Taxonomy and systematics ==
Like all hummingbirds, the lesser violetear belongs to the order Apodiformes. Hummingbirds share this order with the swifts, such as the white-collared swift. The name Apodiformes is derived from the Greek words "a pous", meaning "without foot". While apodiforms do in fact have feet, they are quite small and their legs are short and relatively weak. Many birds in this order cannot walk, and thus rarely if ever land on the ground since quick escape from predators is virtually impossible. For this reason members of this order spend a majority of their time in the air.

=== Subspecies ===
The lesser violetear has four sub-species:

- C. c. cabanidis (Heine), 1863) - Costa Rica, western Panama
- C. c. crissalis Todd, 1942 - Peru and Bolivia
- C. c. cyanotus (Bourcier, 1843) - Colombia, northwestern Venezuela, Ecuador
- C. c. kerdeli Aveledo & Perez, 1991 - northeastern Venezuela
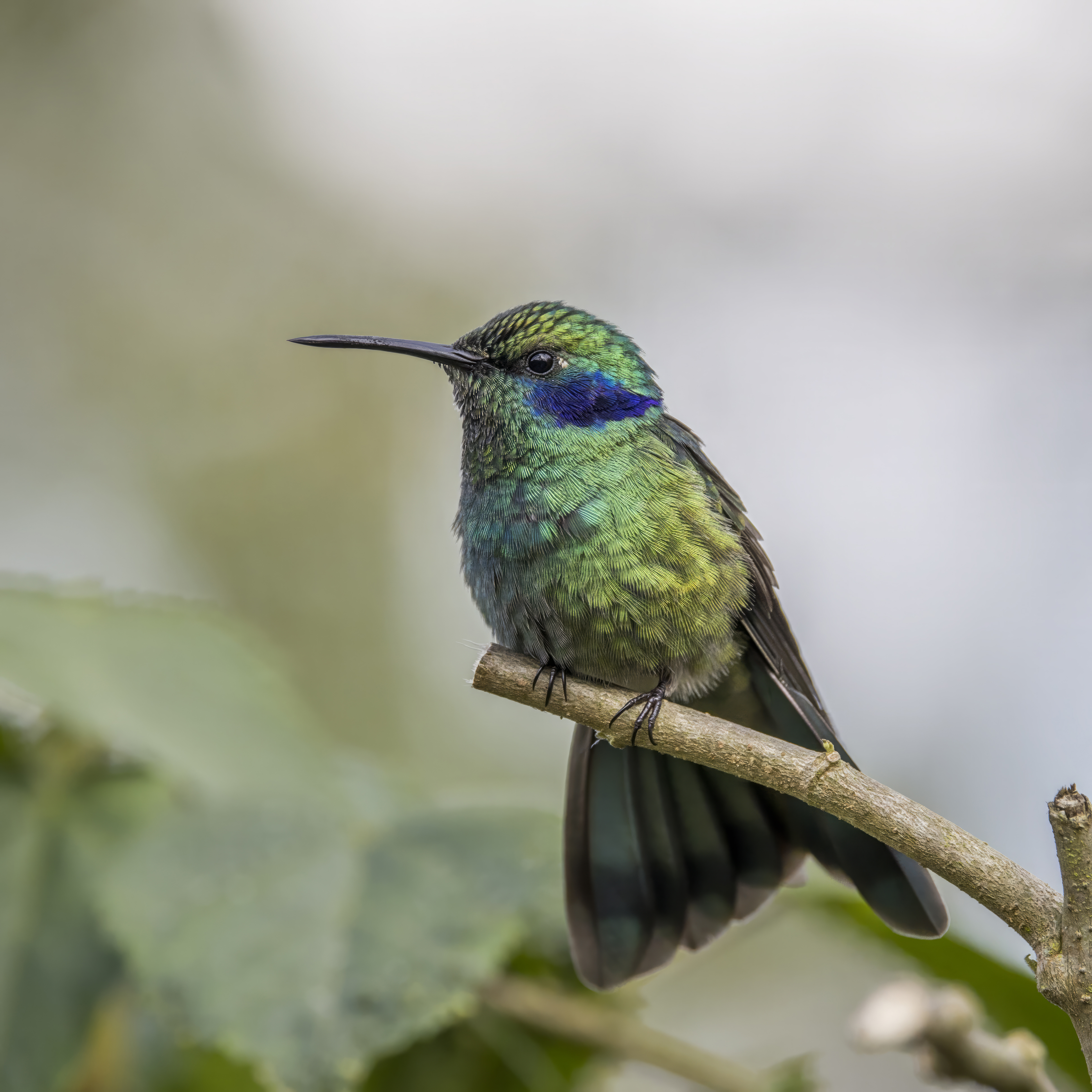
C. c. cyanotus
Colombia

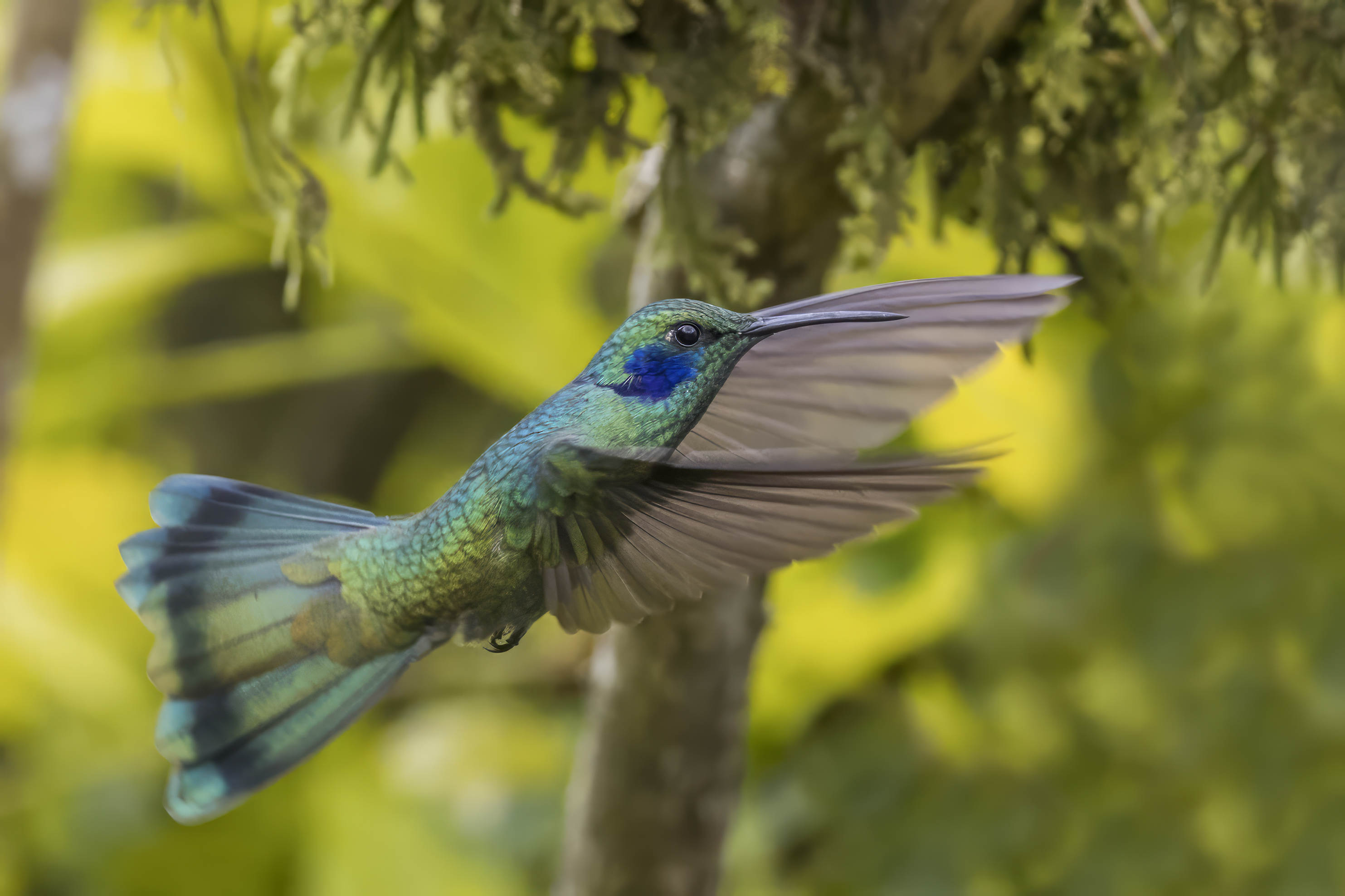
C. c. cyanotus
in flight, Colombia
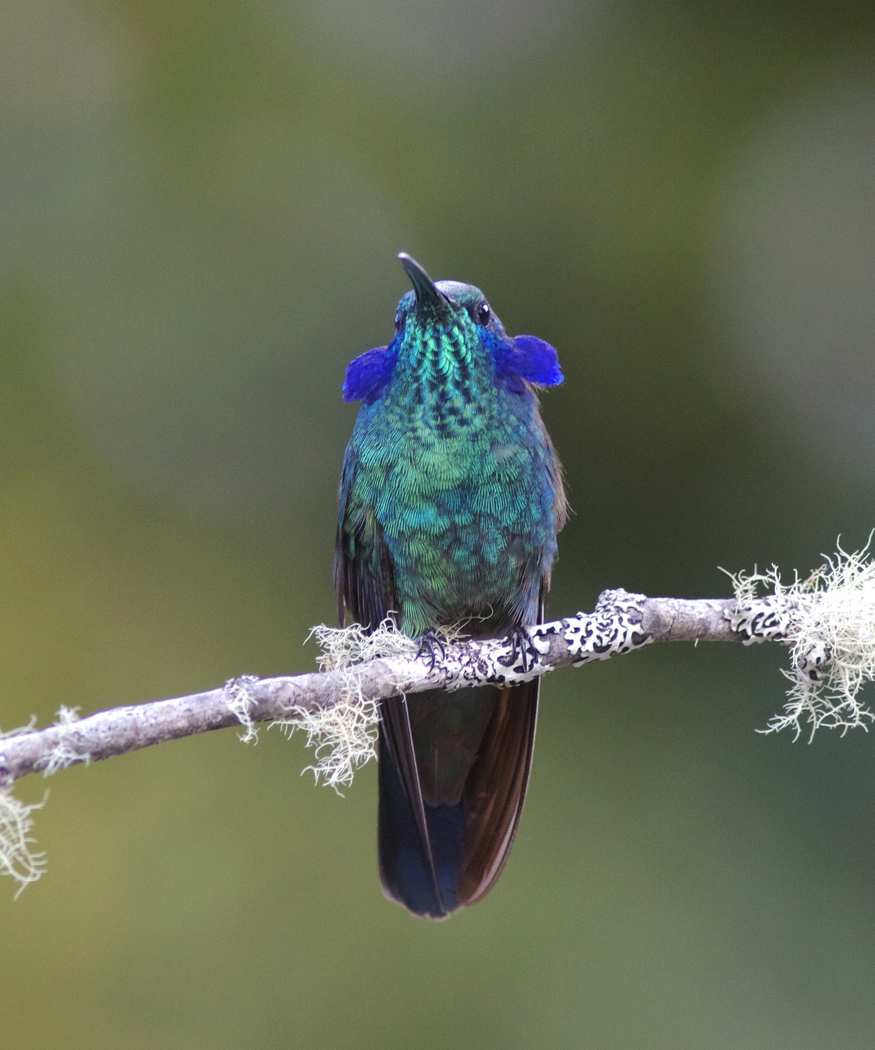
Male C. c. cabanidis displaying its "ears"
Costa Rica

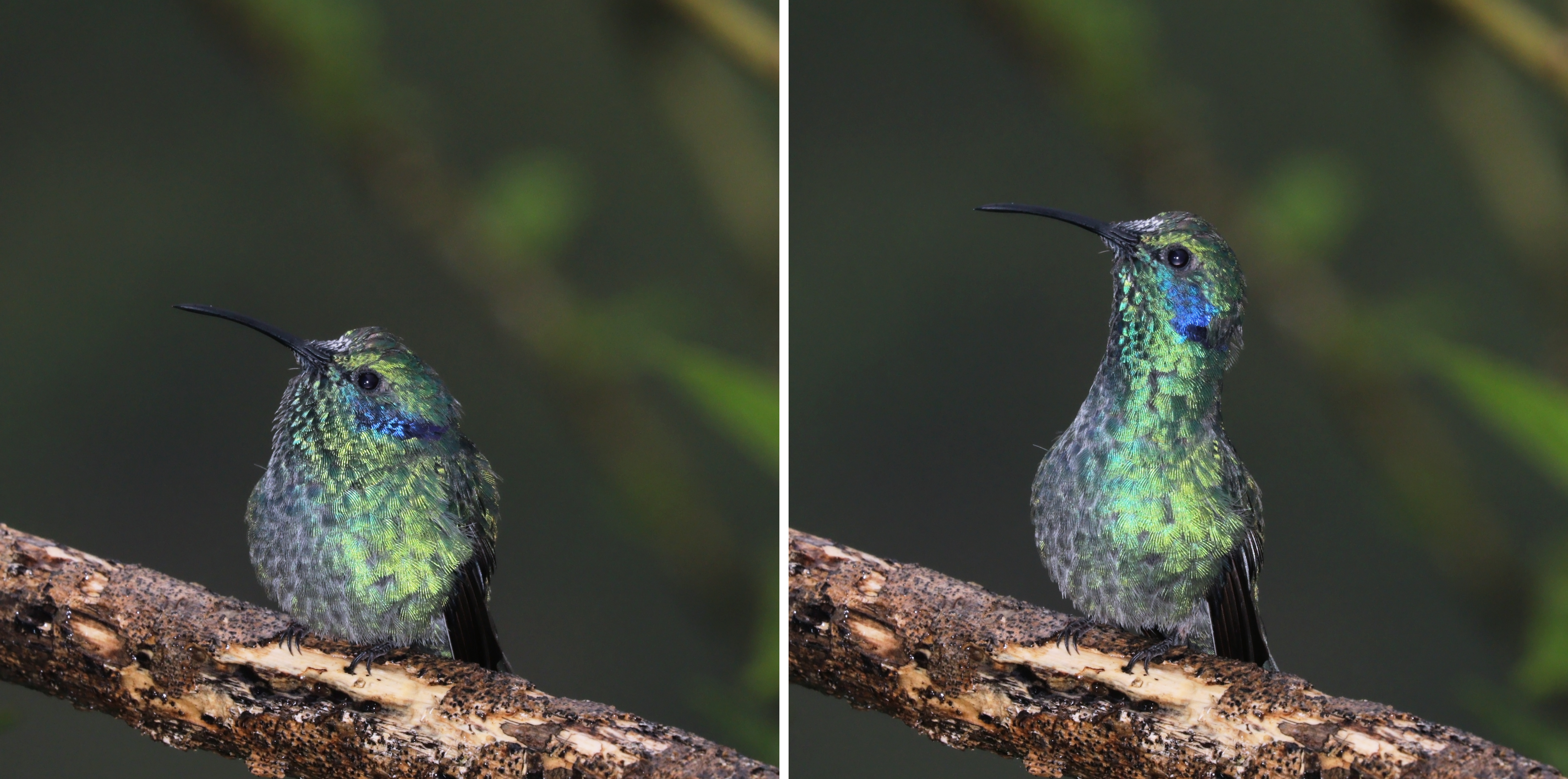
C. c. cabanidis
showing neck stretching
Panama

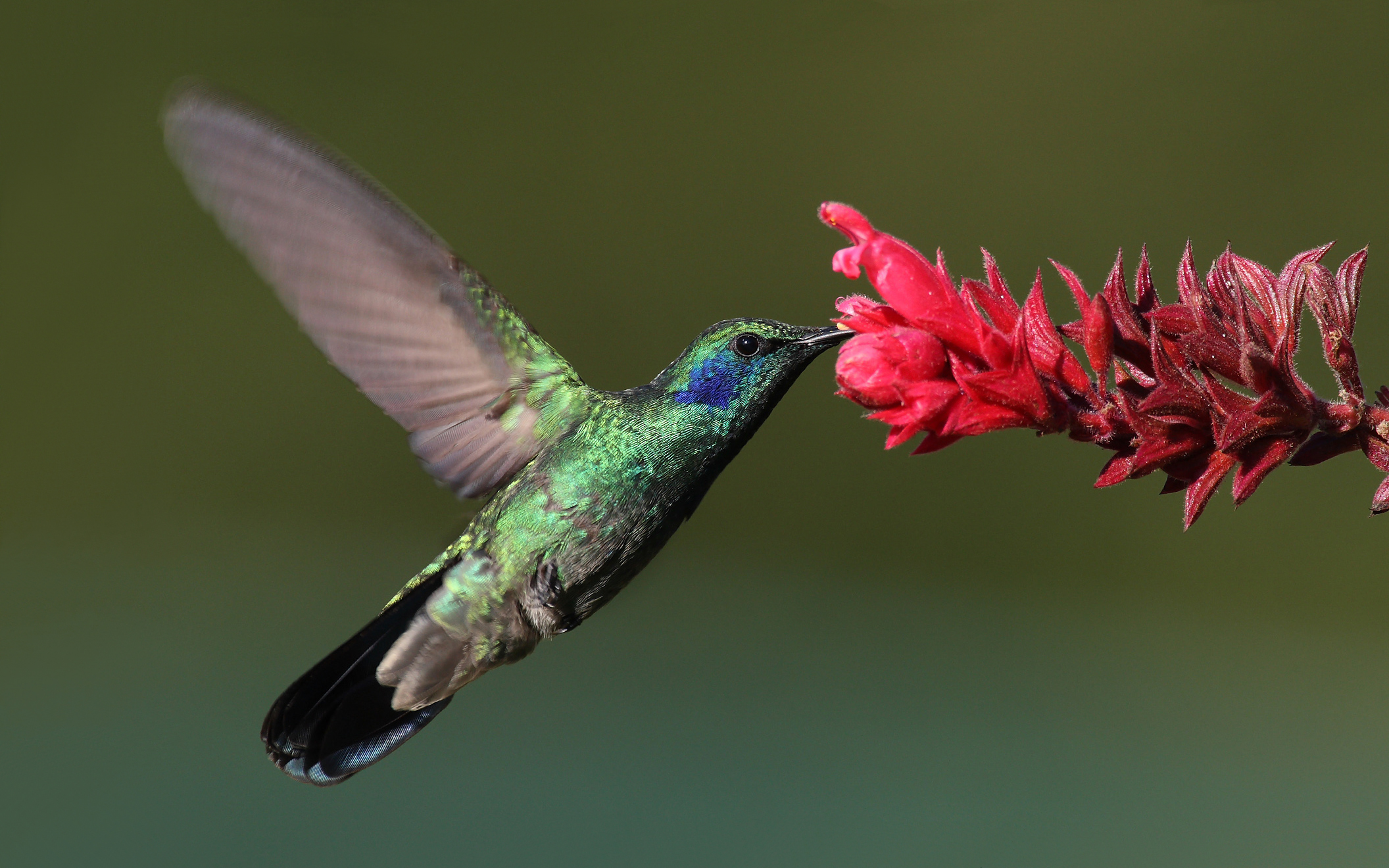
C. c. cabanidis in flight
Panama

== Description ==
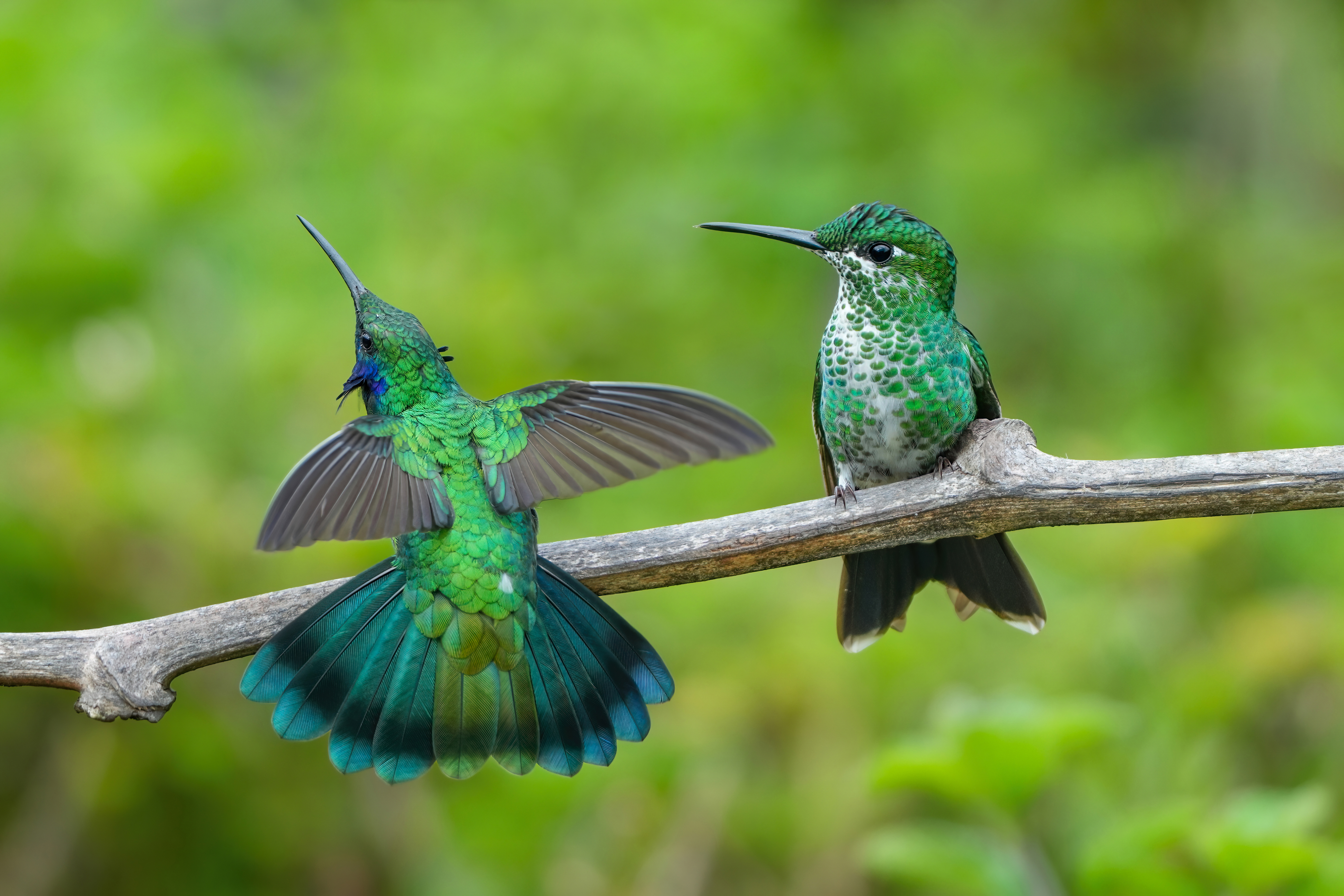
Lesser violetear displaying its ears to a Green-crowned brilliant in Los Quetzales National Park, Costa Rica

The lesser violetear is roughly medium-sized by hummingbird standards. It averages around 9.7 to 12 cm (3.8 to 4.7 in) in total length. Its bill is black and mostly straight with only a slight downward curve and measures from 1.8 to 2.5 cm (0.71 to 0.98 in). The body mass can vary from 4.8 to 5.6 g (0.17 to 0.20 oz). Among standard measurements, the wing chord is 5.8 to 6.8 cm (2.3 to 2.7 in) and the tail is 3.5 to 4.3 cm (1.4 to 1.7 in). It is shining green above with a glittering violet ear-patch on the sides of its neck. Its throat and chest are a more glittering green with a shining green belly. The tail is a metallic blue-green with more bronzy central feathers and a prominent black subterminal band.

=== Vocalizations ===
Solitary males sing from high, exposed twigs in their territory every day. Their song is a monotonously repeated sharp and dry "tsu-tzeek" at a rate of about one call per second.

== Distribution and habitat ==
=== Distribution ===
The lesser violetear breeds from the highlands of Costa Rica and western Panama; mountains of northern Venezuela, and the Andes from western Venezuela to western Bolivia.

=== Habitat ===
Common habitats for the lesser violetear are in the canopy and borders of subtropical and lower temperate forest, secondary woodland and scrub, and clearings and gardens in the subtropical zone on both slopes of the Andes. It is recorded mostly between altitudes of 1,500 to 3,300 m (4,900 to 10,800 ft), although it is sometimes found down to 900 m (3,000 ft). It generally prefers more humid and high-altitude areas, such as cloud forests, than the similar sparkling violetear and is completely absent from the central valley where the sparkling violetear is most prevalent. However, the two species will sometimes be seen in the same areas feeding at flowering Inga trees.

== Behavior and ecology ==
=== Diet ===
The lesser violetear forages alone but tends to gather at flowering trees, especially coffee-shade Inga. They feed at mid-level to canopy and often hold and defend a feeding territory. They primarily feed on nectar and small insects. The lesser violetear has been recorded as attaining the greatest flying speed ever recorded for a hummingbird, with a pair of birds having attained 90 mph (140 km/h) during a chase, although other species may be able to attain similar speeds.

=== Breeding ===
Like most hummingbirds, the lesser violetear is a solitary nester. The male's only involvement in the breeding process is to attract and mate with the female. The female is then responsible for choosing a nest location, generally on a low, small horizontal branch in a protected area. The nest is small and built from various plant materials, spider webs, and down woven together to form a sturdy cup structure. Two small white eggs are laid within the nest and the female incubates them on her own. Incubation time is 14–18 days. Hatchlings are primarily fed insects due to high nutritional requirements. No information was found on the length of the nestling stage or age at fledgling. Breeding takes place through the wet season into the early dry season, which varies by latitude.
