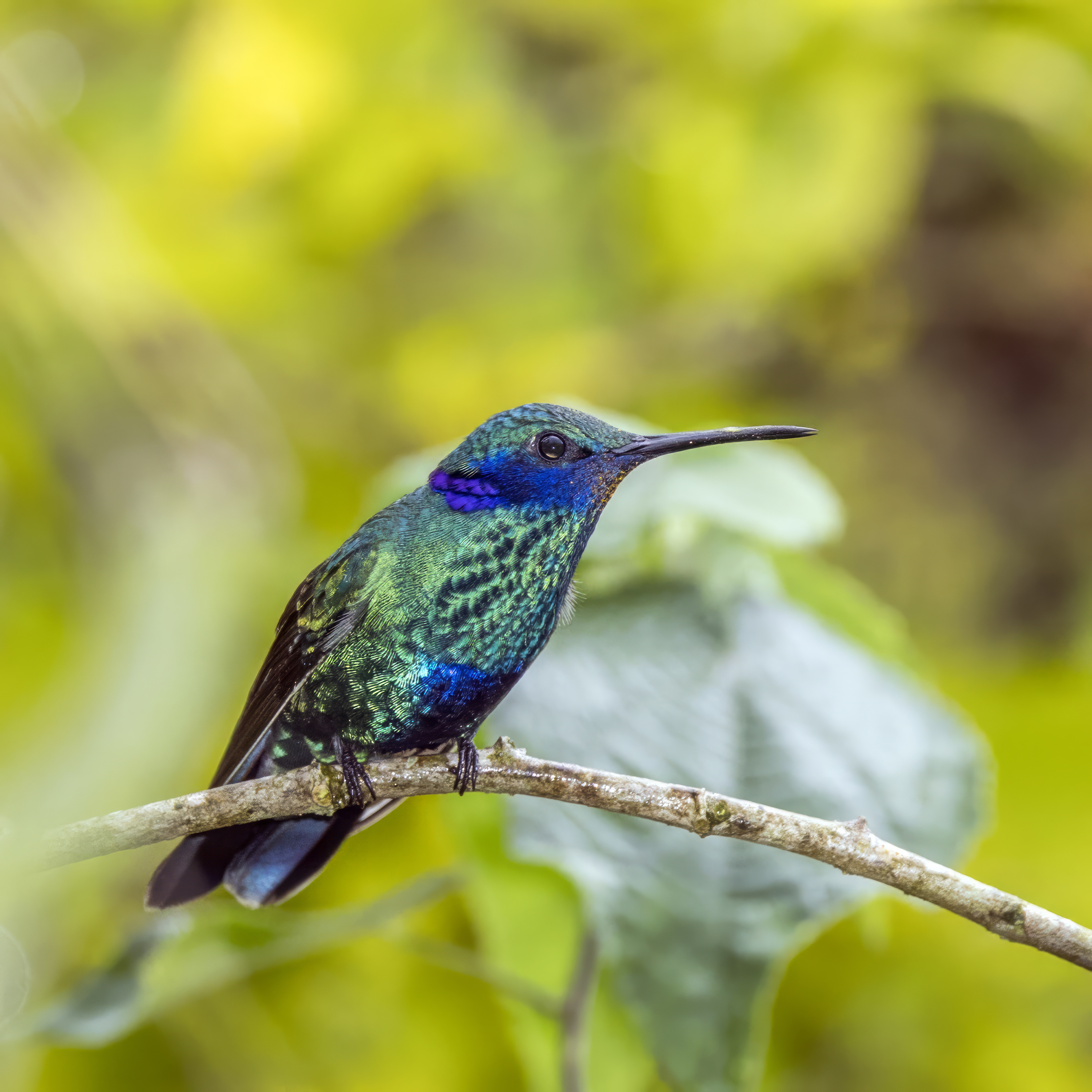

Conservation status
- Least Concern (IUCN 3.1)
- CITES Appendix II

Scientific classification
- Kingdom: Animalia
- Phylum: Chordata
- Class: Aves
- Order: Apodiformes
- Family: Trochilidae
- Genus: Colibri
- Species: C. coruscans

Binomial name
- Colibri coruscans (Gould, 1846)

Audio

= Sparkling violetear =

Species of hummingbird

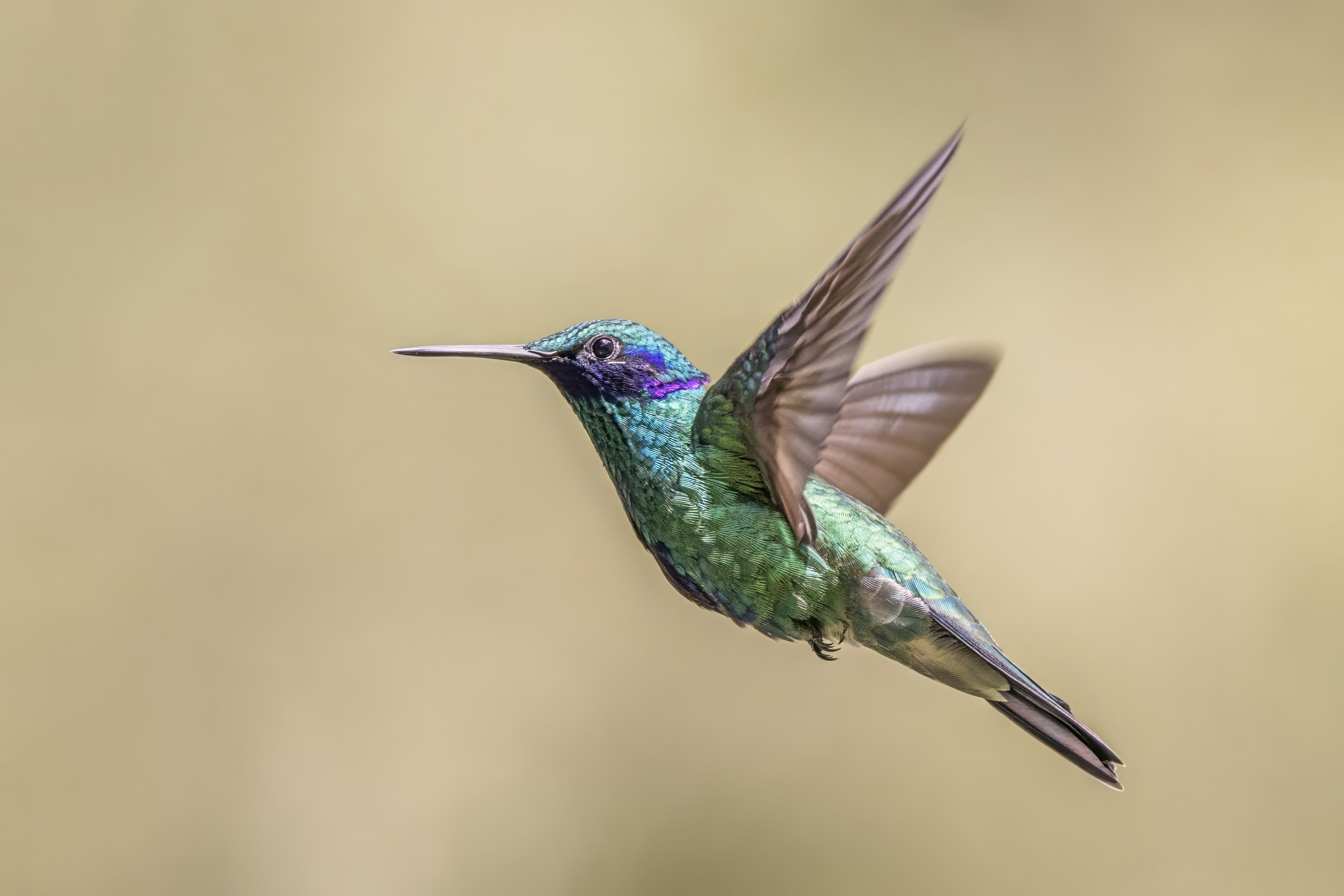

The sparkling violetear (Colibri coruscans) is a species of hummingbird widespread in highlands of northern and western South America, including a large part of the Andes (from Argentina and northwards), the Venezuelan Coastal Range, and the Tepuis. It occurs in a wide range of semi-open habitats, even in gardens and parks within major cities such as Quito, and is often the most common species of hummingbird in its range. It is highly vocal and territorial.

== Taxonomy and systematics ==
The sparkling violetear has two subspecies, the nominate C. c. coruscans and C. c. germanus. Other subspecies have been proposed to be separated from those two but that treatment has not been widely accepted.

== Description ==
The sparkling violetear is the largest violetear at 13 to 14 cm (5 to 5.5 in) long. Male birds weigh 5.8 to 8.5 g (0.20 to 0.30 oz) and females 6 to 7.5 g (0.21 to 0.26 oz). The nominate male's upperparts are metallic bluish green, the chin bluish violet, the belly blue, and the rest of the underparts green. Long erectile bluish violet plumes cover the ears. The tail is metallic green with a steely blue band near the end. Females are similar but smaller, and often have a white spot behind the eye. C. c. germanus is essentially the same as the nominate but the forehead, underparts, and tail are somewhat bluer.

== Distribution and habitat ==
The nominate subspecies of sparkling violetear is widely distributed. It is found in Venezuela's Sierra de Perijá, Colombia's Sierra Nevada de Santa Marta, and the Andes from Venezuela through Colombia, Ecuador, Peru, and Bolivia into northern Chile and northwestern Argentina. C. c. germanus is found on the tepuis of southern Venezuela, western Guyana, and the adjacent Brazilian state of Roraima. The species inhabits a variety of open landscapes including the edges of subtropical and temperate forest, woodland, gardens, city parks, and páramo. In elevation it mostly ranges from 1,000 to 4,500 m (3,300 to 14,800 ft).

== Physiology ==
Sparkling violetears display an extreme level of nighttime torpor to conserve energy during cold temperatures at high elevation, having body temperatures as low as 46 °F (8 °C) during night compared to its daytime body temperature of 96 °F (36 °C).

According to one study, the sparkling violetear has the smallest mean blood-air barrier thickness (0.183 μm) and the highest mass-specific respiratory surface area (87 cm^{2}/g) in birds.

== Behavior ==
=== Movement ===
The páramo populations of sparking violear move to as low as 2,000 m (6,600 ft) in the dry season. Populations below the páramo are generally year-round residents though they may make short movements.

=== Feeding ===
The sparkling violetear forages for nectar from a wide variety of flowering plants at all levels of the forest from the ground to the canopy. It also captures insects on the wing. It is very aggressive in most habitats, dominating all other hummingbirds while defending flowering trees, but aggression has not been observed in the páramo.

=== Breeding ===
The sparkling violetear's breeding seasons vary across its range, from July through October in Venezuela to December through February in Argentina. The nest is a cup made of soft plant materials and decorated with lichens on its outside. It is placed on a horizontal branch, attached to a drooping twig, or sometimes in a cleft in rocks. The clutch size is two eggs. The incubation time is 17 to 18 days with fledging 20 to 22 days after hatch. Though some care of young by males has been reported, that behavior has not been confirmed.

=== Vocalization ===
The sparkling violetear is very vocal. Its principal song is "a long series of monosyllabic metallic chips, 'djit...djit...djit...' or 'tlik...tlik...tlik..'." It also sings "a medley of chips, squeals, gurgling sounds and short warbles" during aerial display. Its call is "a repeated short dry rattle 'drrr...drrr...'."

== Conservation status ==
The IUCN has assessed the sparkling violetear as being of Least Concern, though its population size and trend are unknown. It is common in its various habitat types including human-made ones like gardens and plantations.
