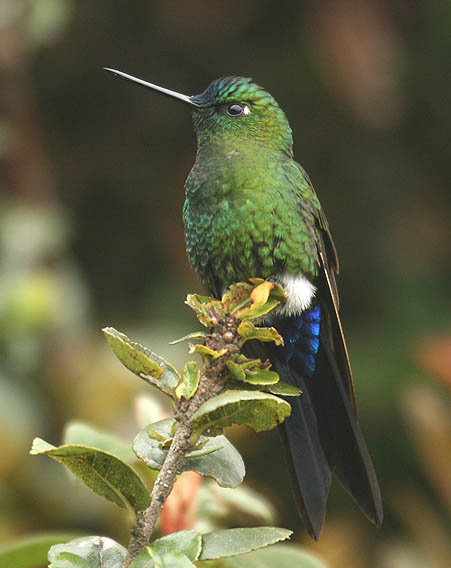
- Sapphire-vented puffleg

Scientific classification
- Kingdom: Animalia
- Phylum: Chordata
- Class: Aves
- Clade: Strisores
- Order: Apodiformes
- Family: Trochilidae
- Subfamily: Lesbiinae
- Tribe: Heliantheini

Groups included
- Eriocnemis; Haplophaedia

Cladistically included but traditionally excluded taxa
- Loddigesia and all other hummingbird genera

= Puffleg =

Pufflegs

Group of hummingbirds

Pufflegs are hummingbirds from the genera Eriocnemis and Haplophaedia. They occur in humid forest, woodland and shrub at altitudes of 1000 to 4800 m. asl in the Andes of Argentina, Bolivia, Peru, Ecuador, Colombia, and Venezuela. The males have a colorful green, coppery or blue plumage, and the females are generally somewhat duller. The most striking feature of both sexes is their dense snow-white leg puffs which consist of feather tufts that resemble woolly panties. One species – the black-thighed puffleg – is characterized by black coloured leg puffs, and another – the buff-thighed puffleg – has lightly buff-tinged leg puffs. Further common features of all species are the straight black bill and the slightly to deeply forked tail. The members of the genus Haplophaedia are generally duller than the members of Eriocnemis.

While most pufflegs remain fairly common, three species (colorful puffleg, black-breasted puffleg and gorgeted puffleg) are critically endangered and one (the turquoise-throated puffleg) is possibly extinct.

== Puffleg species ==
- Genus Eriocnemis
  - Black-breasted puffleg, Eriocnemis nigrivestis
  - Gorgeted puffleg, Eriocnemis isabellae
  - Glowing puffleg, Eriocnemis vestitus
  - Black-thighed puffleg, Eriocnemis derbyi
  - Turquoise-throated puffleg, Eriocnemis godini – possibly extinct (20th century?)
  - Coppery-bellied puffleg, Eriocnemis cupreoventris
  - Sapphire-vented puffleg, Eriocnemis luciani
    - Coppery-naped puffleg, Eriocnemis (luciani) sapphiropygia
  - Golden-breasted puffleg, Eriocnemis mosquera
  - Blue-capped puffleg, Eriocnemis glaucopoides
  - Colorful puffleg, Eriocnemis mirabilis
  - Emerald-bellied puffleg, Eriocnemis aline
- Genus Haplophaedia
  - Greenish puffleg, Haplophaedia aureliae
    - Buff-thighed puffleg, Haplophaedia (aureliae) assimilis
  - Hoary puffleg, Haplophaedia lugens

In addition there were the controversial species: Eriocnemis söderströmi, E. isaacsoni and E. dyselius which were each only known by one specimen. In the case of E. söderströmi it could have been either the female of E. godini or a hybrid between E. luciani and E. nigrivestris. E. dyselius was nothing more than a melanistic individual of E. cupreoventris. Today these species are considered invalid.
