= Gorgeted puffleg =

Conservation status
- Critically Endangered (IUCN 3.1)
- CITES Appendix II (CITES)

Scientific classification
- Kingdom: Animalia
- Phylum: Chordata
- Class: Aves
- Clade: Strisores
- Order: Apodiformes
- Family: Trochilidae
- Genus: Eriocnemis
- Species: E. isabellae

Binomial name
- Eriocnemis isabellae Cortés-Diago, Ortega, Mazariegos-Hurtado & Weller, 2007

Species of hummingbird

The gorgeted puffleg (Eriocnemis isabellae) is a Critically Endangered species of hummingbird in the "brilliants", tribe Heliantheini in subfamily Lesbiinae. It is endemic to Colombia. It was discovered in 2005 and confirmed as a species new to science in 2007.

== Taxonomy and systematics ==
The first known example of the gorgeted puffleg was mist-netted in 2005. Subsequent visits to the area provided more captures and allowed comparison of the birds to specimens of other Eriocnemis pufflegs. The decision that it is a new species was published in 2007. Later that year the South American Classification Committee (SACC) of the American Ornithological Society accepted it for the South American list, and worldwide taxonomic systems soon followed suit. The authors of the 2007 publication suggested that the new species, the black-breasted puffleg (E. nigrivestis), and the glowing puffleg (E. vestita) form a superspecies. The gorgeted puffleg is monotypic.

== Description ==
The gorgeted puffleg is 8 to 9 cm (3.1 to 3.5 in) long and weighs about 4.5 g (0.16 oz). It has a short, straight, black bill. Unique among pufflegs, the male has a glittering violet-blue gorget edged with green. The male's upperparts are mostly blackish with golden olive green iridescence; the rump has a green gloss. The moderately forked tail is dark steely blue. The breast and belly are velvety black with green gloss on the sides and the undertail coverts are blue. The leg puffs are white. The eye is dark brown and the legs blackish. The female's upperparts are a lighter bronzy green with a bluish rump and uppertail coverts. The belly is golden green with rufous fringes to the feathers and a turquoise gloss.

== Distribution and habitat ==
The gorgeted puffleg is known only from the Serranía del Pinche in the Western Andes of Colombia's Department of Cauca. The habitat is characterized by steep slopes of very humid cloudforest and elfin forest with rocky outcrops and natural clearings. The vegetation is dominated by Andean oak (Quercus humboldtii) with an understory of Ericaceae and several other plant families. In elevation this habitat is found mainly between 2,600 and 2,900 m (8,500 and 9,500 ft).

== Behavior ==
=== Movement ===
The movement pattern of the gorgeted puffleg is not known, but seasonal shifts in elevation are believed possible.

=== Feeding ===
The gorgeted puffleg feeds on nectar from flowering shrubs in dense vegetation. It has been recorded feeding at Bejaria resinosa, Cavendishia bracteata, Cinchona pubescens, and Faramea flavicans.

=== Breeding ===
Nothing is known about the gorgeted puffleg's breeding phenology.

=== Vocalization ===
As of early 2022, no recordings of gorgeted puffleg vocalizations were available at Xeno-canto or Cornell University's Macaulay Library. Its song is unknown, but a territorial call is described as "a frequently repeated monosyllabic, sharp 'twek'" that is pitched lower than those of others of its genus.

== Status ==
The IUCN has assessed the gorgeted puffleg as Critically Endangered. It has an extremely small overall range with an even smaller amount of suitable habitat within it. Its population is estimated at between 250 and 999 mature individuals and decreasing. Its habitat is under continuing pressure from illegal coca cultivation, though its home mountain range is nominally protected as the Serranía del Pinche Protective Forest Reserve.
