= Colorful puffleg =

Conservation status
- Endangered (IUCN 3.1)
- CITES Appendix II (CITES)

Scientific classification
- Kingdom: Animalia
- Phylum: Chordata
- Class: Aves
- Clade: Strisores
- Order: Apodiformes
- Family: Trochilidae
- Genus: Eriocnemis
- Species: E. mirabilis

Binomial name
- Eriocnemis mirabilis Meyer de Schauensee, 1967

Species of hummingbird

The colorful puffleg (Eriocnemis mirabilis) is an Endangered species of hummingbird in the "brilliants", tribe Heliantheini in subfamily Lesbiinae. It is endemic to Colombia.

== Taxonomy and systematics ==
The colorful puffleg is monotypic. It is closely related to the emerald-bellied puffleg (E. aline) and they have variously been deemed sister species or a superspecies. However, one author has suggested that because their plumage is so different from that of other Eriocnemis pufflegs that they should have their own genus.

== Description ==
The colorful puffleg is about 8 to 9 cm (3.1 to 3.5 in) long. It has a straight blackish bill. The male has dark shining green upperparts with a glittering green forehead. It has an iridescent green gorget and upper breast, a glittering indigo blue belly, and glittering red and copper undertail coverts. The tail is forked; it is dark bronzy green above and shining golden bronzy green below. The female has mostly white underparts with green dots on the sides of the throat and the breast and reddish bronze spots on the flanks and the sides of the belly. Both sex's leg puffs are white with cinnamon tips, though the female's are smaller than the male's.

== Distribution and habitat ==
The colorful puffleg is known only from a few locations on the west slope of the Western Andes in Colombia's Cauca Department. Most observations have been in undisturbed cloud forest but it also occurs at the forest edge and in clearings. The plant communities are characterized by Colombian oak (Quercus humboldtii) and plants of genera Billia, Clusia, Persea, Hyeronima, and Weinmannia. The observations have been in the fairly narrow elevational range of 2,200 to 2,440 m (7,200 to 8,000 ft).

== Behavior ==
=== Movement ===
The colorful puffleg is sedentary.

=== Feeding ===
The colorful puffleg feeds mostly at levels between 2 and 4 m (7 and 10 ft) above the ground. It has been recorded feeding on nectar from Tillandsia delicatula, Clusia coremandra and other Clusia species, Anthopterus oliganthus, Cavendishia bracteata, Psammisia columbiensis, Besleria quadrangulata, Elleanthus aurantiacus, and Palicourea killipii.

=== Breeding ===
Nothing is known about the colorful puffleg's breeding phenology.

=== Vocalization ===
As of early 2022, Cornell University's Macaulay Library had no recordings of colorful puffleg vocalization, and Xeno-canto had only three. What is thought to be its song is "a repeated single metallic short note 'tsit'".

== Status ==
The IUCN originally assessed the colorful puffleg as Threatened, then in 1994 as Vulnerable and in 2000 as Critically Endangered. The most recent assessment, in 2017, downlisted it to Endangered. Its population is estimated at 250 to 999 adult individuals and is believed to be decreasing. It occupies a few small sites with a total area of suitable habitat of only 14 km^{2} (5.4 sq mi) within its nominal range of about 680 km^{2} (260 sq mi). In 2005, Swarovski Optik donated funds which allowed the American Bird Conservancy and Fundación ProAves to create the 1,980 ha (4,890 acres) Aves Mirabilis Swarovski Nature Reserve for this species. Another site is within Munchique National Natural Park. However, all of the sites are under pressure from logging and illegal coca growing.
