= Coppery-naped puffleg =

Conservation status
- Least Concern (IUCN 3.1)

Scientific classification
- Kingdom: Animalia
- Phylum: Chordata
- Class: Aves
- Order: Apodiformes
- Family: Trochilidae
- Genus: Eriocnemis
- Species: E. luciani
- Subspecies: E. l. sapphiropygia

Trinomial name
- Eriocnemis luciani sapphiropygia Taczanowski, 1874

Synonyms
- Eriocnemis sapphiropygia

Subspecies of bird

The coppery-naped puffleg (Eriocnemis luciani sapphiropygia) is a subspecies of hummingbird found in the Andes in Peru in wet montane forest edges between 2000 and 4000 m altitude. It is usually considered a subspecies of the sapphire-vented puffleg, Eriocnemis luciani.
