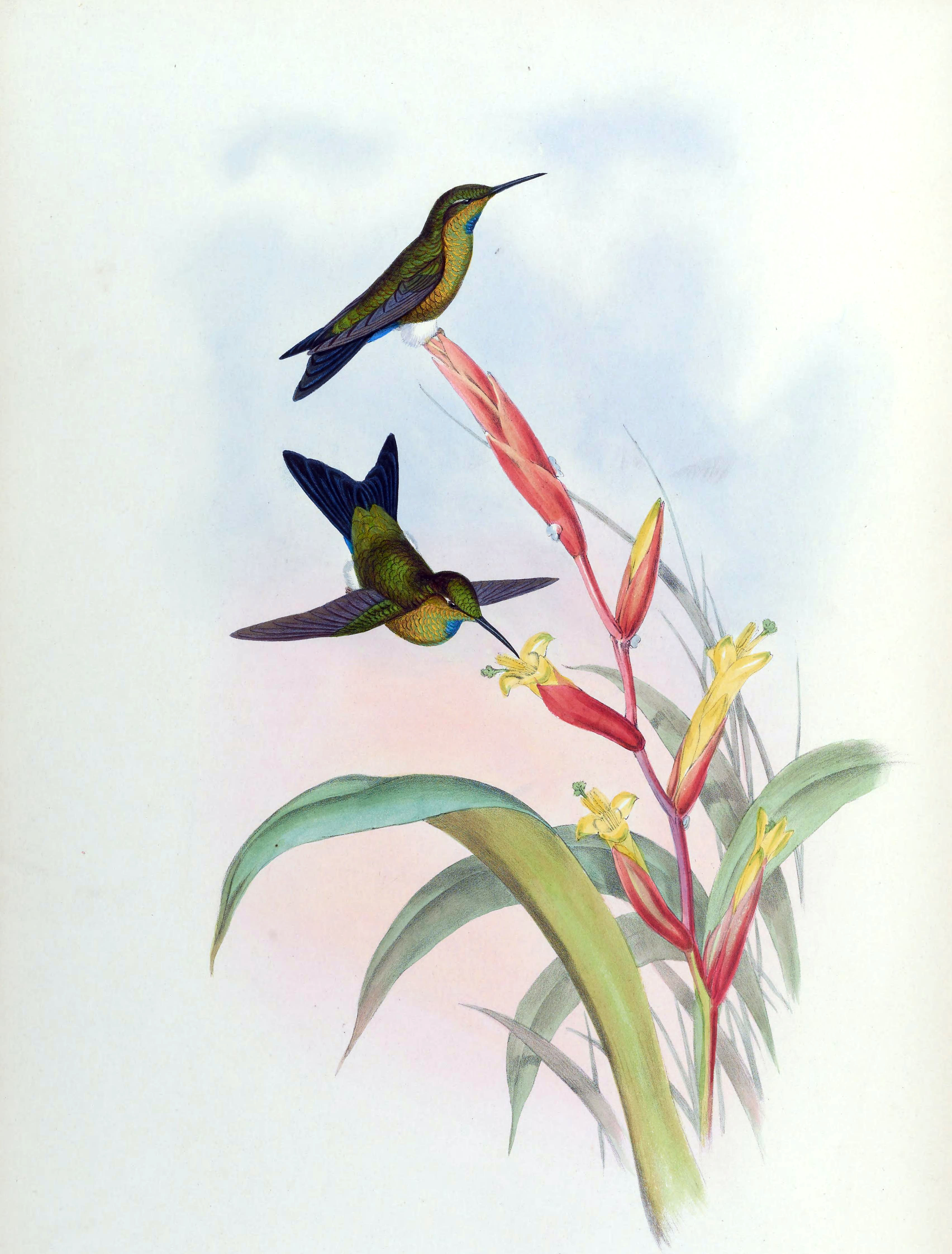

Conservation status
- Critically endangered, possibly extinct (IUCN 3.1)
- CITES Appendix II

Scientific classification
- Kingdom: Animalia
- Phylum: Chordata
- Class: Aves
- Order: Apodiformes
- Family: Trochilidae
- Genus: Eriocnemis
- Species: E. godini

Binomial name
- Eriocnemis godini (Bourcier, 1851)

= Turquoise-throated puffleg =

Species of bird

The turquoise-throated puffleg (Eriocnemis godini), also known as Godin's puffleg, is a species of hummingbird from Ecuador. It is mostly green with blue undertail coverts and white powder-puffs of downy feathers on the legs, and the male has a bluish-purple throat patch. It is only known from a few specimens taken in the nineteenth century and its taxonomic position is unclear. The type of habitat in which the type species was obtained has largely disappeared, and recent surveys trying to find this bird have failed. The International Union for Conservation of Nature believes it may be extinct, but there is a possibility that some individuals remain, so the bird has been rated as "critically endangered".

== Description ==
Based on the few known specimens, it has a total length of 10–11 centimetres. The plumage of the male is predominantly green with a turquoise tinted throat. Both sexes have violet blue untertail-coverts and a straight black bill. The upperparts and the main part of the underparts are shimmering golden green in the males. Rump and uppertail-coverts are bluish green. The throat is pale violet blue and the forked tail is bluish black. The female lacks the throat patches, its plumage is less light and the belly more golden. Like all pufflegs it has striking leg-puffs of dense white downy feather tufts.

== Taxonomical debate ==
The turquoise-throated puffleg is a subject of a taxonomical debate, at least partially due to its status and the few known specimens. Graves (1996) assumed it could be a hybrid between E. vestita and an undetermined Eriocnemis species, while Ridgely (2001) suggested to see it as subspecies of the E. vestita.

== Distribution and status ==
This hummingbird is only known by six specimens which were collected in the 19th century. Only the type specimen from 1850 has a known locality, it being from the Chillo valley, Guayllabamba plains, Ecuador, at an altitude between 2,100 and 2,300 m asl. Two skins are simply labelled "Bogotá" – a common practice in the 19th century and not necessarily directly related to the actual locality where they were taken. It has been suggested that these two "Bogotá" specimens originated from Pasto in Nariño, Colombia.

Virtually all presumed habitat at the type locality has been destroyed. Only a few remnants are left in the steep-sided stream-cuts in the arid upper Guaillabamba drainage.

After an unconfirmed sighting in 1976, there was a survey in 1980, but this was unsuccessful.

== See also ==
- List of hummingbirds
