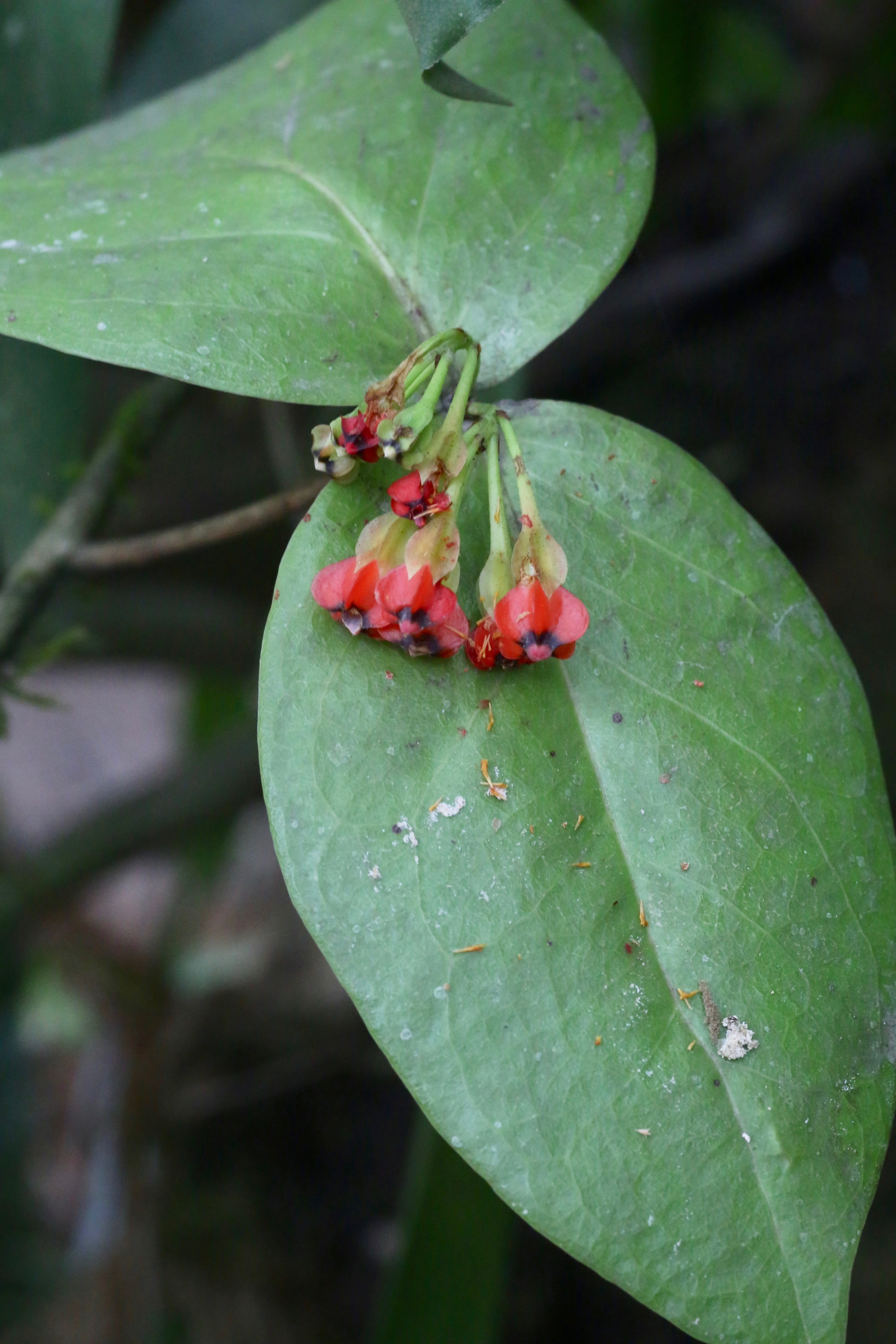

Conservation status
- Least Concern (IUCN 3.1)

Scientific classification
- Kingdom: Plantae
- Clade: Embryophytes
- Clade: Tracheophytes
- Clade: Angiosperms
- Clade: Eudicots
- Clade: Asterids
- Order: Ericales
- Family: Ericaceae
- Genus: Anthopterus
- Species: A. wardii

Binomial name
- Anthopterus wardii Ball

Synonyms
- Thibaudia wardii (Ball) Hoerold; Anthopterus bracteatus A.C.Sm.

= Anthopterus wardii =

Species of flowering plant

Anthopterus wardii, also known as aengue mishito, is a species of neotropical blueberry in the family Ericaceae native to the tropical regions of Central and South America, such as Panama, Colombia, and Ecuador.

== Description ==
=== Vegetative characteristics ===
Anthopterus wardii is a small, epiphytic or occasionally terrestrial, scandent, sparsely branched shrub with up to 10 m (33 ft) long branches. The elliptic to ovate-elliptic leaves are 4–10 cm (1.6–3.9 in) long, and 1.5–3.5 cm (0.6–1.4 in) wide.

=== Generative characteristics ===
The androecium consists of 10 stamens. The fruit is a bright purple, smooth, subglobose berry.

== Taxonomy ==
It was published by John Ball in 1884.

== Distribution and habitat ==
It is native to Colombia, Ecuador, and Panama where it occurs in tropical lowland and montane forests.

== Conservation ==
The IUCN conservation status is least concern (LC).
