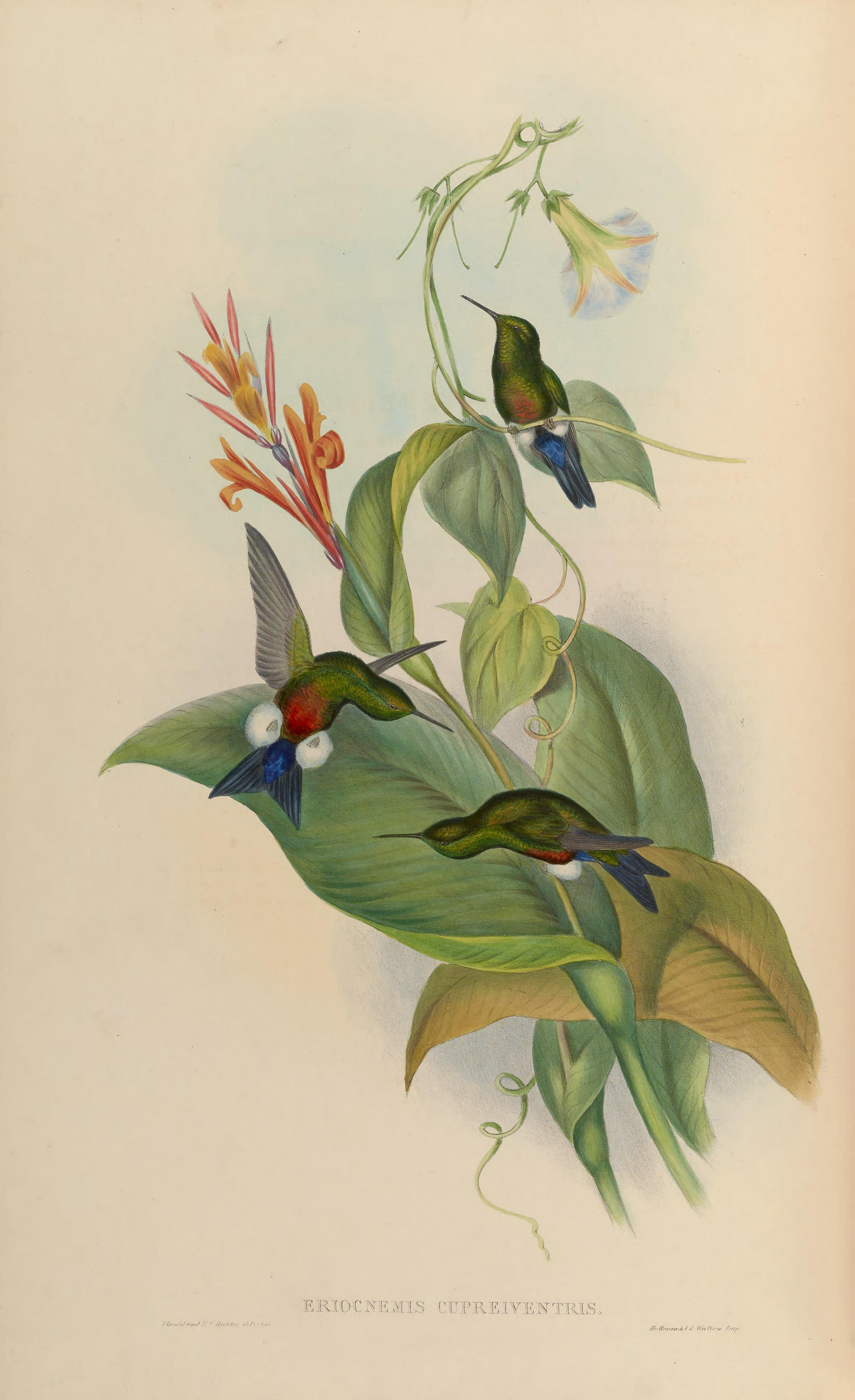

Conservation status
- Near Threatened (IUCN 3.1)
- CITES Appendix II (CITES)

Scientific classification
- Kingdom: Animalia
- Phylum: Chordata
- Class: Aves
- Clade: Strisores
- Order: Apodiformes
- Family: Trochilidae
- Genus: Eriocnemis
- Species: E. cupreoventris

Binomial name
- Eriocnemis cupreoventris (Fraser, 1840)

Synonyms
- Eriocnemis simplex

= Coppery-bellied puffleg =

Species of hummingbird

The coppery-bellied puffleg (Eriocnemis cupreoventris) is a species of hummingbird in the "brilliants", tribe Heliantheini in subfamily Lesbiinae. It is found in Colombia and Venezuela.

== Taxonomy and systematics ==
The coppery-bellied puffleg is monotypic.

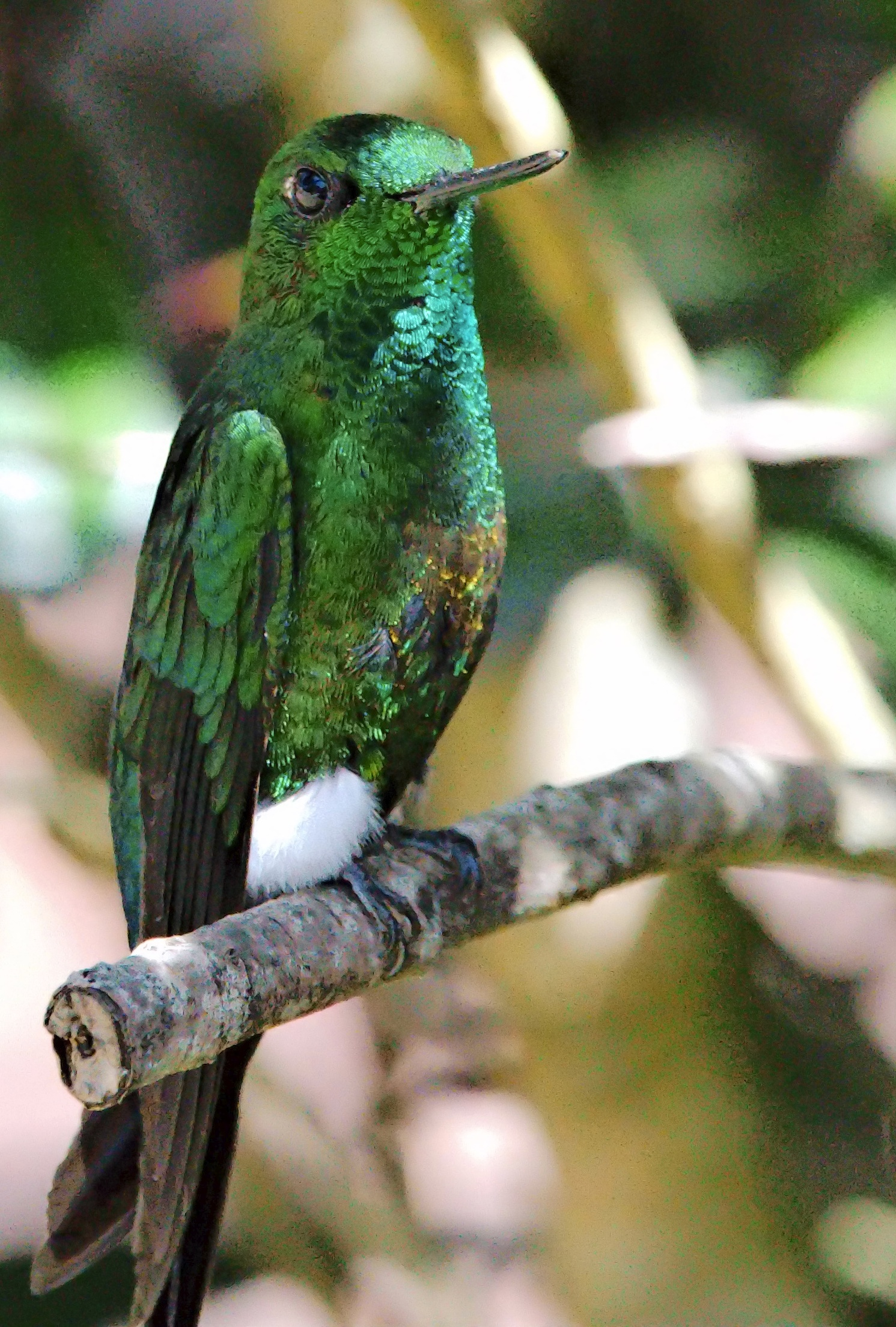
Male coppery-bellied puffleg

== Description ==
The coppery-bellied puffleg is 9 to 10 cm (3.5 to 3.9 in) long and weighs 4.4 to 5.6 g (0.16 to 0.20 oz). It has a straight black bill. The male has shining green upperparts with bluish green uppertail coverts. Its throat, breast, and flanks are glittering green, the center of its belly golden-copper, and its undertail coverts glittering violet. Its leg puffs are white. The tail is forked and blue-black. The female is similar, but its throat has grayish white speckles and the coppery belly is less intense. The juvenile has a blackish breast and no copper on the belly.

== Distribution and habitat ==
The coppery-bellied puffleg is found from the Andes of northwestern Venezuela's Mérida state south and west in the Eastern Andes of Colombia as far as Cundinamarca Department. It mostly inhabits open landscapes such as the edges of montane forest, shrubby slopes, and the lower reaches of the páramo zone, though it also occurs inside humid forest. In elevation it ranges between 2,000 and 3,000 m (6,600 and 9,800 ft) but is most abundant above 2,500 m (8,200 ft).

== Behavior ==
=== Movement ===
The copper-bellied puffleg is mostly sedentary but makes seasonal elevational movements.

=== Feeding ===
The coppery-bellied puffleg feeds on nectar at shrubs and small trees whose flowers have short corollas. Some preferred plants are those of genera Palicourea, Cavendishia, and Pernettya. It nectars while clinging to the flower and is "pugnacious and territorial" at flowering plants. Its diet also includes insects taken by hawking.

=== Breeding ===
The coppery-bellied puffleg's breeding season is from September to January. Its nest has not been described but is usually placed in dense vegetation. The female incubates the clutch of two white eggs but the incubation period and time to fledging are not known.

=== Vocalization ===
The coppery-bellied puffleg's only described vocalization is "a single metallic note 'tseek', repeated at irregular intervals". It is given both from a perch and while hovering.

== Status ==
The IUCN has assessed the coppery-bellied puffleg as Near Threatened. It does not have a large range; its population size is not known and is believed to be decreasing. Much of its habitat has been converted to croplands and grazing.
