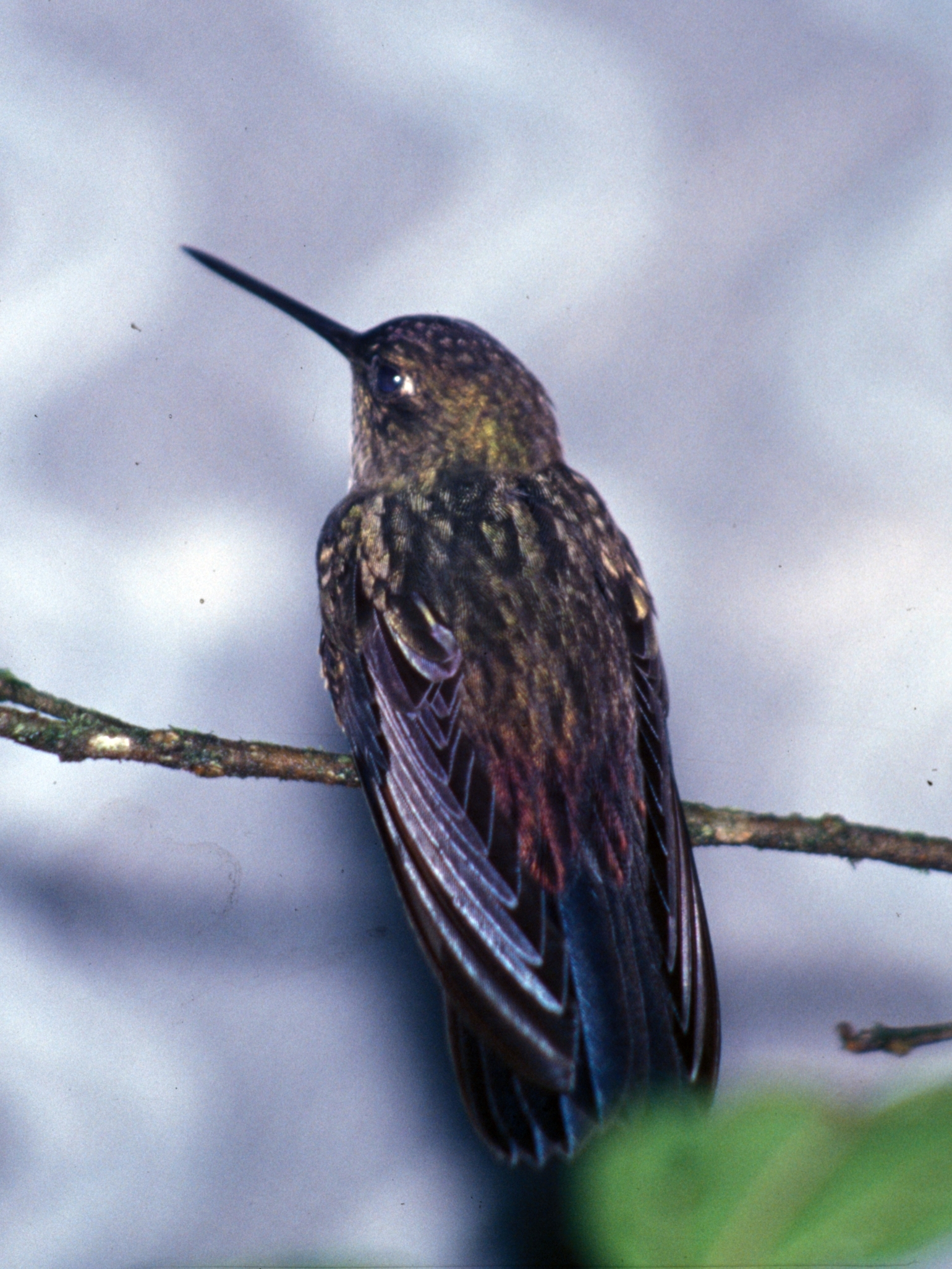
- Greenish puffleg, Haplophaedia aureliae

Scientific classification
- Kingdom: Animalia
- Phylum: Chordata
- Class: Aves
- Order: Apodiformes
- Family: Trochilidae
- Tribe: Heliantheini
- Genus: Haplophaedia; Simon, 1918

Type species
- Trochilus aureliae Bourcier & Mulsant, 1846

Species
- 2-3, see text

= Haplophaedia =

Genus of birds

Haplophaedia is a small genus of hummingbirds, which – together with the members of the genus Eriocnemis – are known as pufflegs. They are found at low levels in humid forest, woodland and shrub at altitudes of 1,200 to 3,100 m (3,900 to 10,200 ft) in the Andes of Bolivia, Peru, Ecuador, and Colombia. All species have a straight black bill, a coppery-green plumage, and a slightly forked dark blue tail. The leg-puffs are white in the greenish and hoary pufflegs, and buff-tinged in the buff-thighed puffleg.

== Species ==
Three species are currently recognized, though the buff-thighed puffleg is sometimes considered a subspecies of the greenish puffleg.

Genus Haplophaedia – Simon, 1918 – two species
Common name	Scientific name and subspecies	Range	Size and ecology	IUCN status and estimated population
Greenish puffleg	Haplophaedia aureliae (Bourcier & Mulsant, 1846) Six subspecies: H. a. floccus (Nelson, 1912); H. a. galindoi Wetmore, 1967; H. a. caucensis (Simon, 1911); H. a. aureliae (Bourcier & Mulsant, 1846); H. a. russata (Gould, 1871); H. a. cutucuensis Schuchmann, Weller, & Heynen, 2000	Colombia, Ecuador, and Panama.	Size: Habitat: Diet:	LC
Buff-thighed puffleg	Haplophaedia assimilis (Elliot, 1876) Two subspecies: H. a. assimilis; H. a. affinis	Bolivia and Peru	Size: Habitat: Diet:	LC
Hoary puffleg	Haplophaedia lugens (Gould, 1852)	Colombia and Ecuador.	Size: Habitat: Diet:	NT
