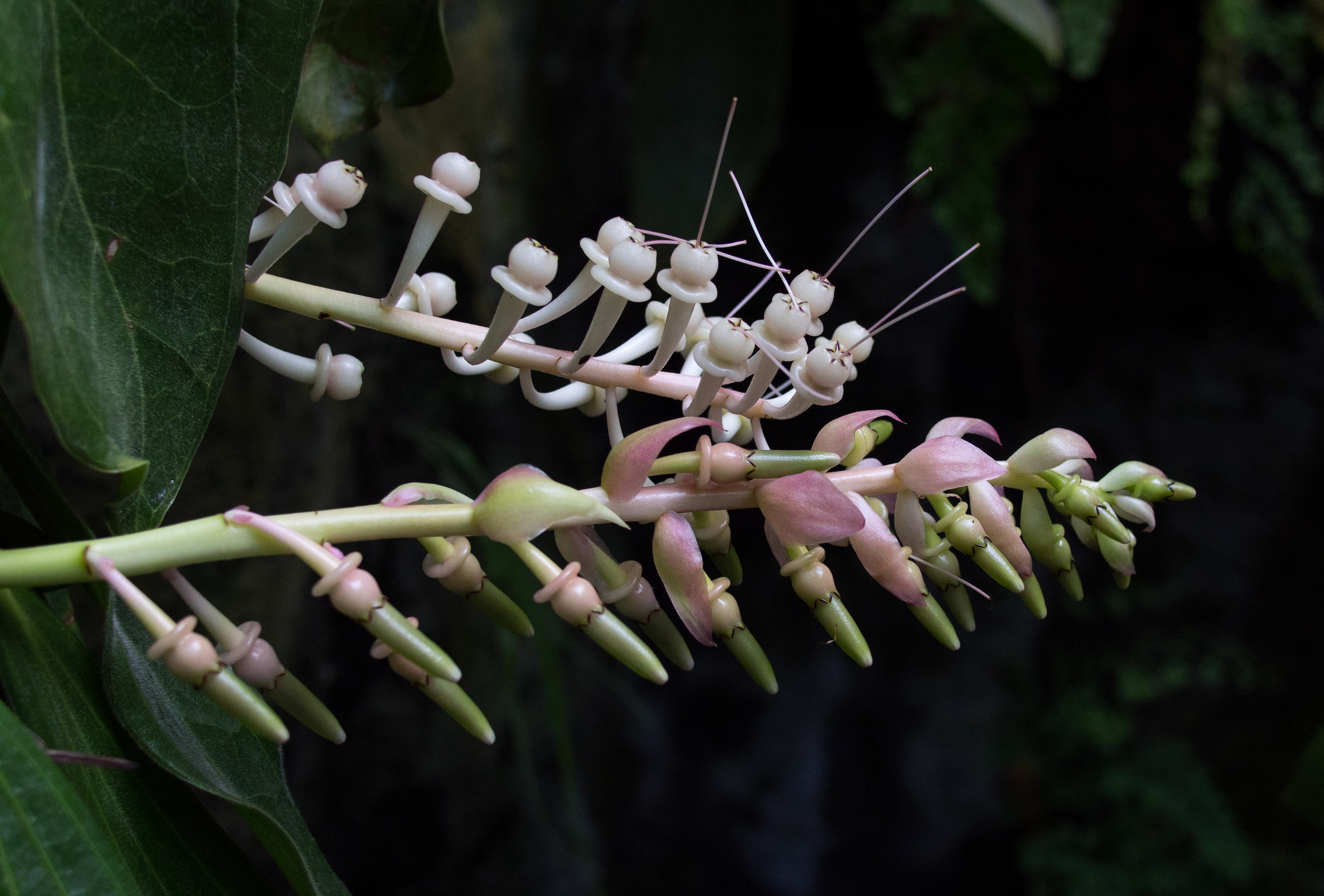
- Cavendishia grandifolia at the New York Botanical Garden

Conservation status
- Near Threatened (IUCN 3.1)

Scientific classification
- Kingdom: Plantae
- Clade: Tracheophytes
- Clade: Angiosperms
- Clade: Eudicots
- Clade: Asterids
- Order: Ericales
- Family: Ericaceae
- Genus: Cavendishia
- Species: C. grandifolia

Binomial name
- Cavendishia grandifolia Hoerold (1909)

= Cavendishia grandifolia =

Species of flowering plant

Cavendishia grandifolia is a species of woody perennial plant of the genus Cavendishia in the family Ericaceae. It is native to Ecuador. Its fruit, commonly known as neotropical blueberries, are edible.
