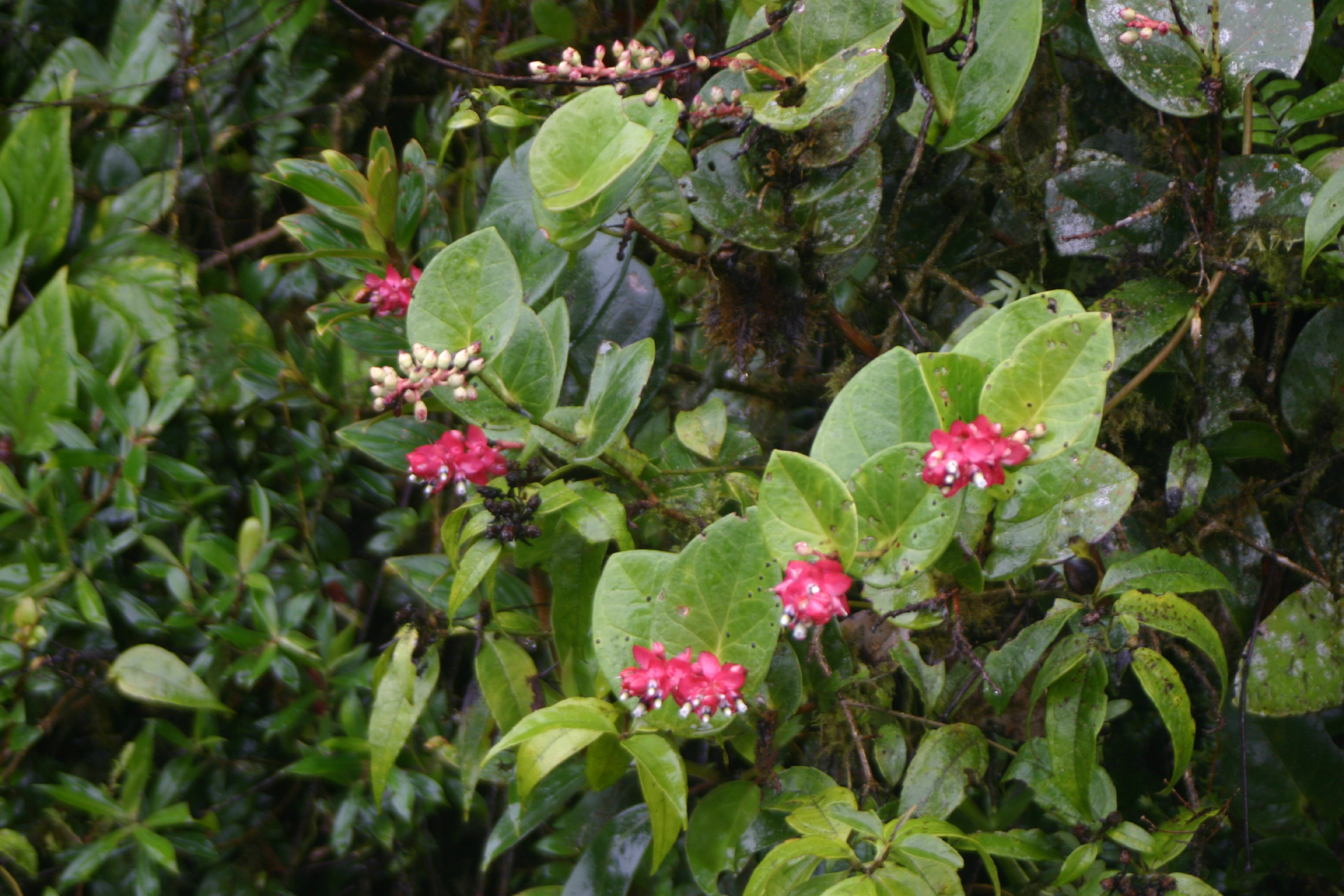
- Cavendishia complectens growing epiphytically in Monteverde, Costa Rica.

Scientific classification
- Kingdom: Plantae
- Clade: Tracheophytes
- Clade: Angiosperms
- Clade: Eudicots
- Clade: Asterids
- Order: Ericales
- Family: Ericaceae
- Genus: Cavendishia
- Species: C. complectens

Binomial name
- Cavendishia complectens Hemsl.

Synonyms
- Chupalon complectens (Hemsl.) Kuntze

= Cavendishia complectens =

Species of epiphyte

Cavendishia complectens is a shrub found in wet tropical biomes. It is native to Colombia, Costa Rica, Nicaragua, Panama. It is epiphytic and is a subspecies of Cavendishia.
