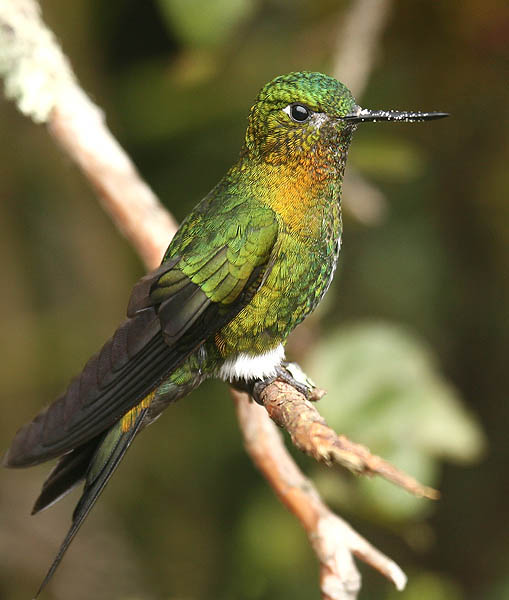
- Yanacocha, Ecuador

Conservation status
- Least Concern (IUCN 3.1)
- CITES Appendix II

Scientific classification
- Kingdom: Animalia
- Phylum: Chordata
- Class: Aves
- Order: Apodiformes
- Family: Trochilidae
- Genus: Eriocnemis
- Species: E. mosquera

Binomial name
- Eriocnemis mosquera (Delattre & Bourcier, 1846)

= Golden-breasted puffleg =

Species of hummingbird

The golden-breasted puffleg (Eriocnemis mosquera) is a species of hummingbird in the "brilliants", tribe Heliantheini in subfamily Lesbiinae. It is found in Colombia and Ecuador.

== Taxonomy and systematics ==
The golden-breasted puffleg is monotypic. However, at one time it was suggested that the northern and southern populations formed subspecies.

== Description ==
The golden-breasted puffleg is about 11 to 13 cm (4.3 to 5.1 in) long and weighs about 5.3 g (0.19 oz). It has a straight black bill. The male has shining green upperparts with a bronzier green nape and rump. Its underparts are mostly glittering golden green. Its lower throat and upper breast are coppery bronze and the undertail coverts brownish. Its leg puffs are white. The tail is forked; its central feathers are blue-green and the outer two pairs dark green to blue-black. The female is slightly smaller and has somewhat greener undertail coverts but is otherwise similar to the male.

== Distribution and habitat ==
The golden-breasted puffleg is found in the Central and Western Andes of Colombia with a few records in the Eastern Andes. It also occurs in much of the length of the Andes in Ecuador. The species inhabits the edges and clearings of stunted montane forest, elfin forest, and shrubby zones near treeline. In elevation in Colombia it ranges between 1,200 and 3,600 m (3,900 and 11,800 ft) but is usually found above 2,600 m (8,500 ft). In Ecuador it mostly occurs between 3,000 and 3,600 m (9,800 and 11,800 ft).

== Behavior ==
=== Movement ===
The golden-breasted puffleg is suspected to make seasonal elevational movements but has not been documented doing so.

=== Feeding ===
The golden-breasted puffleg forages for nectar at low flowers, both while hovering and by clinging to the flower. It is "active and aggressive" defending feeding territories. No details of its preferred plants are known. It also feeds on small insects like other hummingbirds.

=== Breeding ===
Little is known about the golden-breasted puffleg's breeding phenology. A nest discovered in November in Colombia was a cup made of moss and sticks lined with plant down, placed on the end of a slender branch under a rock overhang. An adult was on the nest so the observer assumed that it was incubating eggs.

=== Vocalization ===
The golden-breasted puffleg's calls are "trit notes".

== Status ==
The IUCN has assessed the golden-breasted puffleg as being of Least Concern. Though it has a fairly small range and its population size is not known, the population is believed to be stable. No immediate threats have been identified. It is deemed common in Colombia and uncommon to fairly common in Ecuador. "Human activity has little short-term direct effect on Golden-breasted Puffleg, other than the local effects of habitat destruction".
