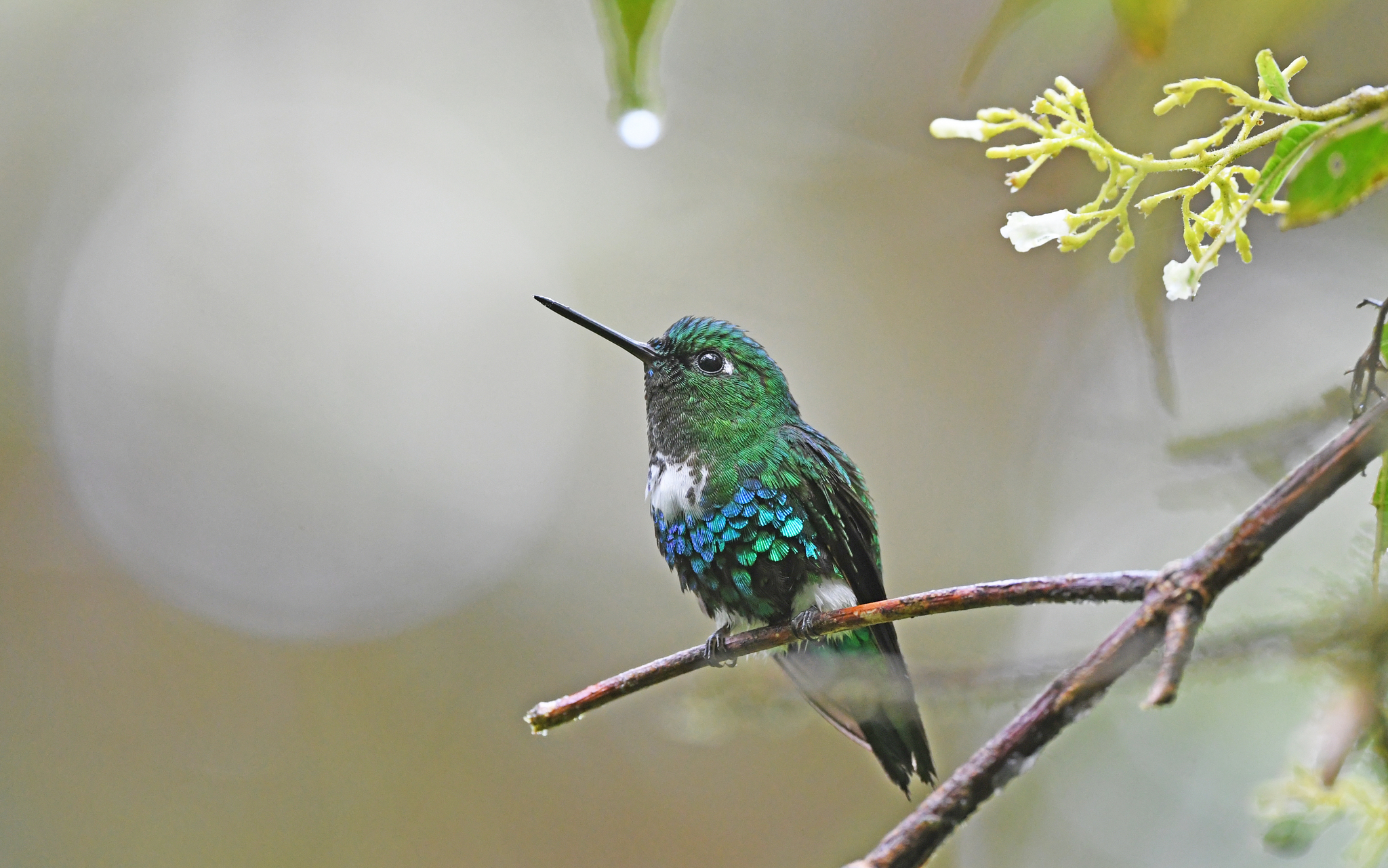

Conservation status
- Least Concern (IUCN 3.1)
- CITES Appendix II (CITES)

Scientific classification
- Kingdom: Animalia
- Phylum: Chordata
- Class: Aves
- Clade: Strisores
- Order: Apodiformes
- Family: Trochilidae
- Genus: Eriocnemis
- Species: E. aline

Binomial name
- Eriocnemis aline (Bourcier, 1843)

= Emerald-bellied puffleg =

Species of hummingbird

The emerald-bellied puffleg (Eriocnemis aline) is a species of hummingbird in the "brilliants", tribe Heliantheini in the subfamily Lesbiinae. It is found in Colombia, Ecuador, and Peru.

== Taxonomy and systematics ==
The emerald-bellied puffleg has two subspecies, the nominate E. a. aline and E. a. dybowskii. It is closely related to the colorful puffleg (E. mirabilis) and they have variously been deemed sister species or superspecies. However, one author has suggested that because their plumage is so different from that of other Eriocnemis pufflegs that they should have their own genus.

== Description ==
The emerald-bellied puffleg is the smallest puffleg. It is 8 to 9 cm (3.1 to 3.5 in) long and weighs 4.0 to 4.5 g (0.14 to 0.16 oz). It has a straight black bill. The male of the nominate subspecies has dark shining green upperparts with a narrow glittering bluish green forehead. It has a large white patch with green spots on its upper breast and the rest of the underparts are glittering bluish green. The tail is short and slightly forked; it is green with a markedly iridescent underside. The female is similar but without the bluish green forehead; its wings and tail are somewhat shorter. Both sex's leg puffs are white and very large. Subspecies E. a. dybowskii is larger than the nominate but the male's forehead patch is smaller and the white breast is less sharply defined.

== Distribution and habitat ==
The nominate subspecies of emerald-bellied puffleg is the more northerly. It is found in Colombia's Central and Eastern Andes from Boyacá Department south through Ecuador on the eastern slope of the Andes. E. a. dybowskii is found on the eastern slope of the Peruvian Andes as far south as the Department of Pasco. The species inhabits tropical and subtropical montane forest, especially humid types like cloudforest. It occurs in the forest interior and small openings but shuns forest edges and more open landscapes. In elevation it is usually found between 2,300 and 2,800 m (7,500 and 9,200 ft).

== Behavior ==
=== Movement ===
The emerald-bellied puffleg is sedentary.

=== Feeding ===
The emerald-bellied puffleg forages for nectar in dense vegetation; it usually feeds between about 1 and 3 m (3 and 10 ft) of the ground. It also feeds on small insects.

=== Breeding ===
Nothing is known about the emerald-bellied puffleg's breeding phenology.

=== Vocalization ===
The emerald-bellied puffleg makes "a single, slightly buzzy, metallic note, 'tzit'" call at irregular intervals while hovering.

== Status ==
The IUCN has assessed the emerald-bellied puffleg as being of Least Concern. It has a fairly large range but its population size is not known and is believed to be decreasing. It "seems to depend on humid forests which have already suffered heavy damage, and are currently under threat of further deforestation."
