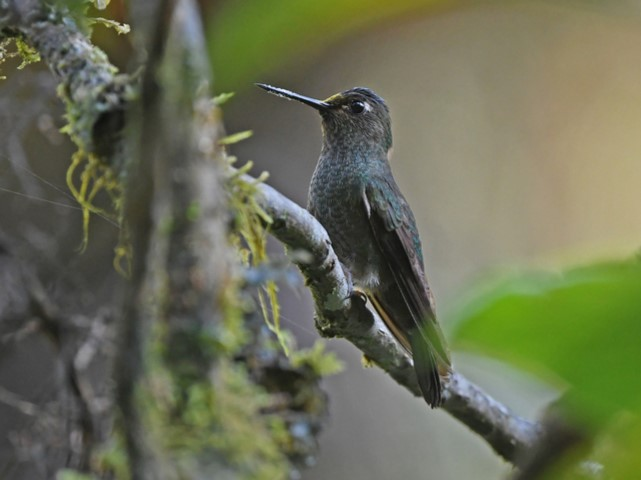

Conservation status
- Least Concern (IUCN 3.1)
- CITES Appendix II

Scientific classification
- Kingdom: Animalia
- Phylum: Chordata
- Class: Aves
- Order: Apodiformes
- Family: Trochilidae
- Genus: Haplophaedia
- Species: H. assimilis

Binomial name
- Haplophaedia assimilis (Elliot, 1876)

= Buff-thighed puffleg =

Species of hummingbird

The buff-thighed puffleg (Haplophaedia assimilis) is a species of hummingbird in the "brilliants", tribe Heliantheini in subfamily Lesbiinae. It is found in Bolivia and Peru.

== Taxonomy and systematics ==
The buff-thighed puffleg was for a time considered to be a subspecies of greenish puffleg (H. aureliae) but was then returned to full species status. As of early 2022 it is again under consideration for reinclusion in H. aureliae but the proposal does not have much support. It has two recognized subspecies, the nominate H. a. assimilis and H. a. affinis.

== Description ==
The buff-thighed puffleg is 9 to 10 cm (3.5 to 3.9 in) long and weighs 5 to 6 g (0.18 to 0.21 oz). It has a straight blackish bill. Adults of both sexes of the nominate subspecies are mostly dark green and have a slightly forked blue-black tail. Their namesake leg puffs are creamy buff to whitish. H. a. affinis is a darker green overall and has a bluer tail; its leg puffs are pale rufous. Juveniles are like adults with the addition of brown fringes on the feathers of the head and neck.

== Distribution and habitat ==
Subspecies H. a. affinis of the buff-thighed puffleg is the more northerly of the two. It is found on the eastern slope of the Andes in northern and central Peru. The nominate H. a. assimilis is found from the eastern Andean slope of Peru's Department of Cuzco southeast into central Bolivia as far as Cochabamba Department. It inhabits the undergrowth and edges of humid to wet pre-montane forest. In elevation it ranges between 1,500 and 3,000 m (4,900 and 9,800 ft) but seldom occurs above 2,500 m (8,200 ft).

== Behavior ==
=== Movement ===
The buff-thighed puffleg is thought to seasonally disperse to the lower parts of its elevational range.

=== Feeding ===
The buff-thighed puffleg mostly feeds near the ground, taking nectar from small groups of flowers. It is territorial and defends clusters of flowering bushes. In addition to nectar, it feeds on insects that it usually gleans from leaves but occasionally catches by hawking from a perch.

=== Breeding ===
Almost nothing is known about the buff-thighed puffleg's breeding phenology. It is known that the female alone incubates the clutch of two white eggs.

=== Vocalization ===
What is thought to be the buff-thighed puffleg's song is "a repeated single strident note 'tsuk...tsuk...tsuk...'... occasionally interspersed by a double-noted 'tsi-tsuk'". It also makes "a dry rattle and some chattering notes in series."

== Status ==
The IUCN has assessed the buff-thighed puffleg as being of Least Concern, though its population size is not known and is believed to be decreasing. It appears to be "generally fairly common" though H. a. affinis is known from only a few localities.
