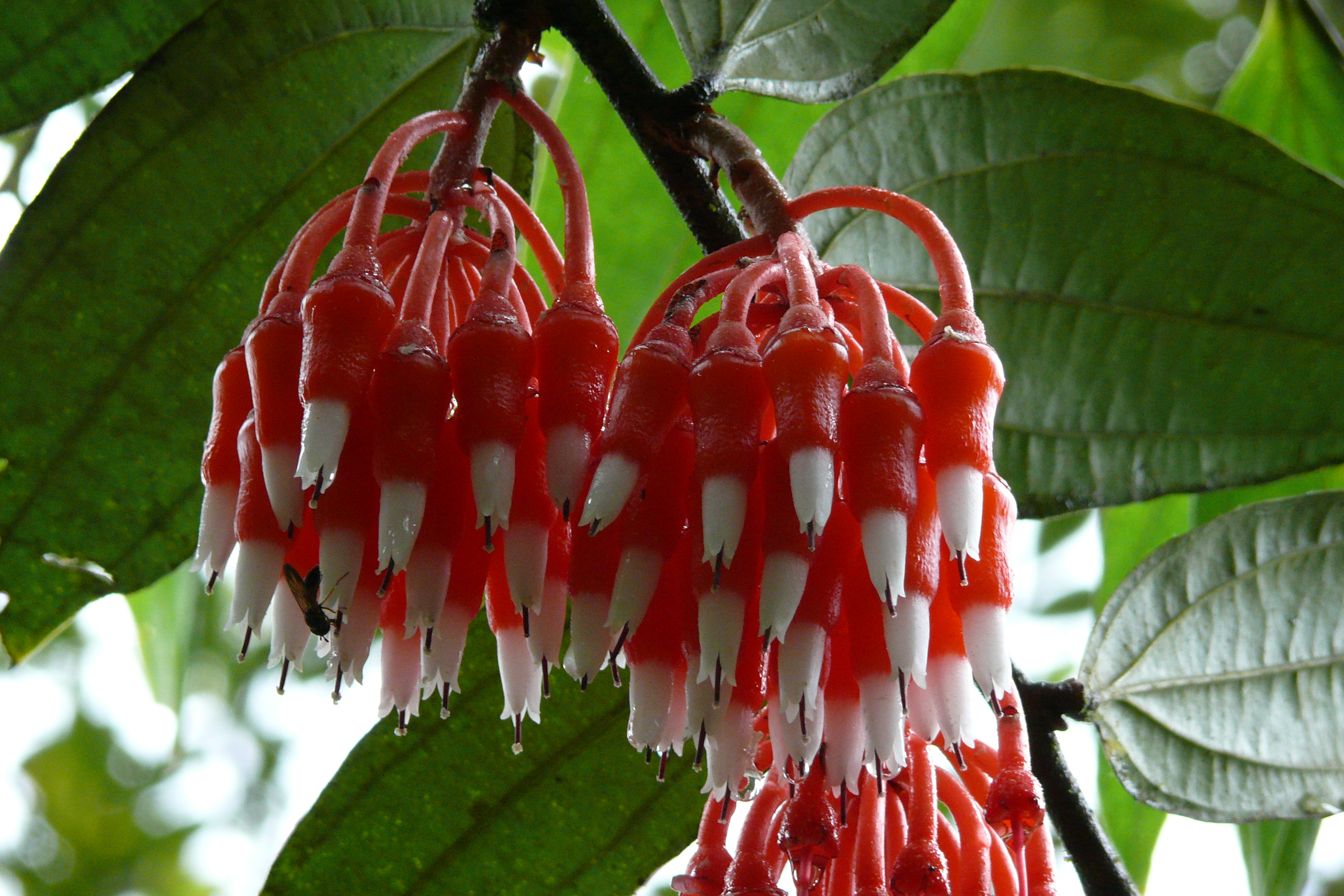
- Psammisia sp., Ecuador

Scientific classification
- Kingdom: Plantae
- Clade: Tracheophytes
- Clade: Angiosperms
- Clade: Eudicots
- Clade: Asterids
- Order: Ericales
- Family: Ericaceae
- Subfamily: Vaccinioideae
- Tribe: Vaccinieae
- Genus: Psammisia; Klotzsch

Type species
- Psammisia falcata Klotzsch

= Psammisia =

Genus of flowering plants

Psammisia is a genus of flowering plants in the family Ericaceae. It contains the fruiting bushes commonly called joyapas and is distributed throughout the Neotropics.

== Description ==
Psammisia are shrubs can be found on land or as epiphytes. Their leaves are usually arranged alternately, occasionally in pairs, with a leathery texture and smooth edges. The flowers are typically grouped in small clusters or elongated spikes, with each flower having a small bract and two basal bracteoles. The flowers have five petals, no scent, and a valve-like arrangement as they open. The calyx is fused, forming a tube that is round or occasionally winged, with the upper part standing upright or spreading out. The corolla is also fused, forming a tube that can be cylindrical, elongated, urn-shaped, or nearly spherical, with a fleshy texture. Psammisia flowers have 8 to 12 stamens, which are equal in length to about one-third of the corolla or almost as long as the corolla itself. The stamen filaments may be separate or joined together, and they often have two conspicuous spurs at the tips. The anthers are rigid and open through elongated slits facing inward. The ovary is positioned below the flower. Psammisia plants produce fruit in the form of berries, which have a leathery texture.

== Taxonomy ==
It was described by Johann Friedrich Klotzsch in 1851. The type species is Psammisia falcata Klotzsch. Within the subfamily Vaccinioideae it is placed in the tribe Vaccinieae.

=== Species ===
Species include:

Image	Name	Distribution
	Psammisia aberrans	Colombia, Ecuador, and Peru
	Psammisia amazonica	Ecuador (Morona-Santiago Prov.) and Peru
	Psammisia aurantiaca	Ecuador (Pichincha)
	Psammisia caloneura	southern Colombia and northern Ecuador
	Psammisia chionantha	Ecuador
	Psammisia columbiensis	Colombia and Ecuador
	Psammisia corallina	Ecuador
	Psammisia cuyujensis	Ecuador (Napo Prov.)
	Psammisia darienensis	Panama
	Psammisia debilis	Southern Colombia to central Ecuador.
	Psammisia dolichopoda	Panama, Colombia, and Ecuador
	Psammisia ecuadorensis	Ecuador
	Psammisia ferruginea	W Panama, Colombia, and Ecuador
	Psammisia fissilis	Ecuador and Peru
	Psammisia flaviflora	Ecuador (Pichincha Prov.)
	Psammisia grabneriana	Colombia and Ecuador
	Psammisia guianensis	Brazil and the Guianas, to Venezuela, Colombia, Ecuador, Peru, and Bolivia
	Psammisia idalima	Southern Colombia (Putumayo) and Ecuador
	Psammisia incana	Ecuador (Napo Prov.)
	Psammisia montana	West-central Colombia to northern Ecuador (Carchi)
	Psammisia oreogenes	Ecuador
	Psammisia orientalis	Ecuador (Morona-Santiago)
	Psammisia pauciflora	Colombia, Ecuador, Peru, and Bolivia
	Psammisia ramiflora	Costa Rica and Panama
	Psammisia roseiflora	Oriente of Ecuador
	Psammisia sclerantha	Ecuador
	Psammisia sodiroi	Colombia and Ecuador
	Psammisia ulbrichiana	Colombia, Ecuador, and Peru
	Psammisia williamsii	Costa Rica

== Distribution and habitat ==
Psammisia occurs in Bolivia, Brazil, Colombia, Costa Rica, Ecuador, Guyana, Panama, Peru, Trinidad-Tobago, and Venezuela.
