= Black-thighed puffleg =

Conservation status
- Near Threatened (IUCN 3.1)
- CITES Appendix II

Scientific classification
- Kingdom: Animalia
- Phylum: Chordata
- Class: Aves
- Order: Apodiformes
- Family: Trochilidae
- Genus: Eriocnemis
- Species: E. derbyi

Binomial name
- Eriocnemis derbyi (Delattre & Bourcier, 1846)

Synonyms
- Eriocnemis derbianus

Species of hummingbird

The black-thighed puffleg (Eriocnemis derbyi) is a species of hummingbird in the "brilliants", tribe Heliantheini in subfamily Lesbiinae. It is found in Colombia and Ecuador.

== Taxonomy and systematics ==
The black-thighed puffleg is monotypic though at one time it was thought to have two subspecies.

== Description ==
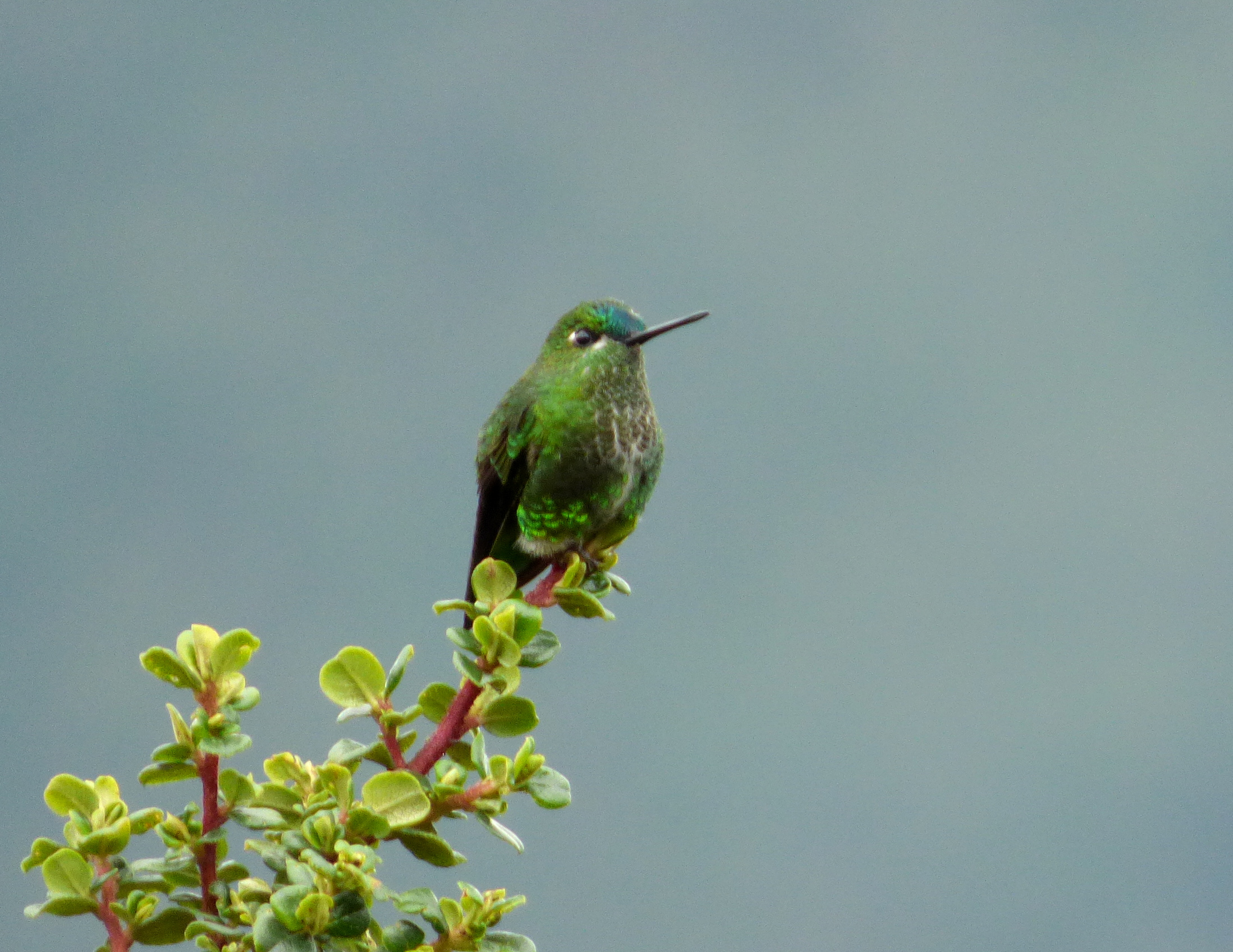
female bird

The black-thighed puffleg is about 10 cm (3.9 in) long. It has a straight blackish bill. Males are mostly shining golden green overall, sometimes with black highlights, and has glittering malachite green upper- and undertail coverts. Their leg puffs are black and the tail is forked and black. Females are similar but have white underparts with green spots, and their leg puffs are a mix of black and grayish white. The female also has a blue tinge to the forehead. Juveniles resemble females.

== Distribution and habitat ==
The black-thighed puffleg is found in the Central Andes of Colombia from Tolima Department and south to Imbabura Province in northwestern Ecuador. It inhabits bushy pastures and the edges of humid forest, and in Colombia has also been recorded in shrubby ravines. It prefers somewhat open landscapes. In elevation it ranges from 2,500 to 3,600 m (8,200 to 11,800 ft) and is most common above 2,900 m (9,500 ft).

== Behavior ==
=== Movement ===
The black-thighed puffleg makes seasonal elevational movements.

=== Feeding ===
The black-thighed puffleg feeds on nectar, usually at the flowers of low-growing plants like Fuchsia and Arecaceae. Its diet also includes insects taken by hawking.

=== Breeding ===
Very little is known about the black-thighed puffleg's breeding phenology. Its nesting season has not been defined but appears to include February. The female incubates the two white eggs; the incubation period and time to fledging are not known.

=== Vocalization ===
The black-thighed puffleg's only described vocalization is "a short buzzy trill 'tzzrr', repeated at irregular intervals". It is given both from a perch and while hovering, and is very different than the sounds of other Eriocnemis pufflegs.

== Status ==
The IUCN has assessed the black-thighed puffleg as Near Threatened. It has a moderately small range; its population size is not known and believed to be decreasing due to habitat loss. It is considered uncommon to locally common, and "[r]eadily takes to man-made habitats like pastures and gardens".
