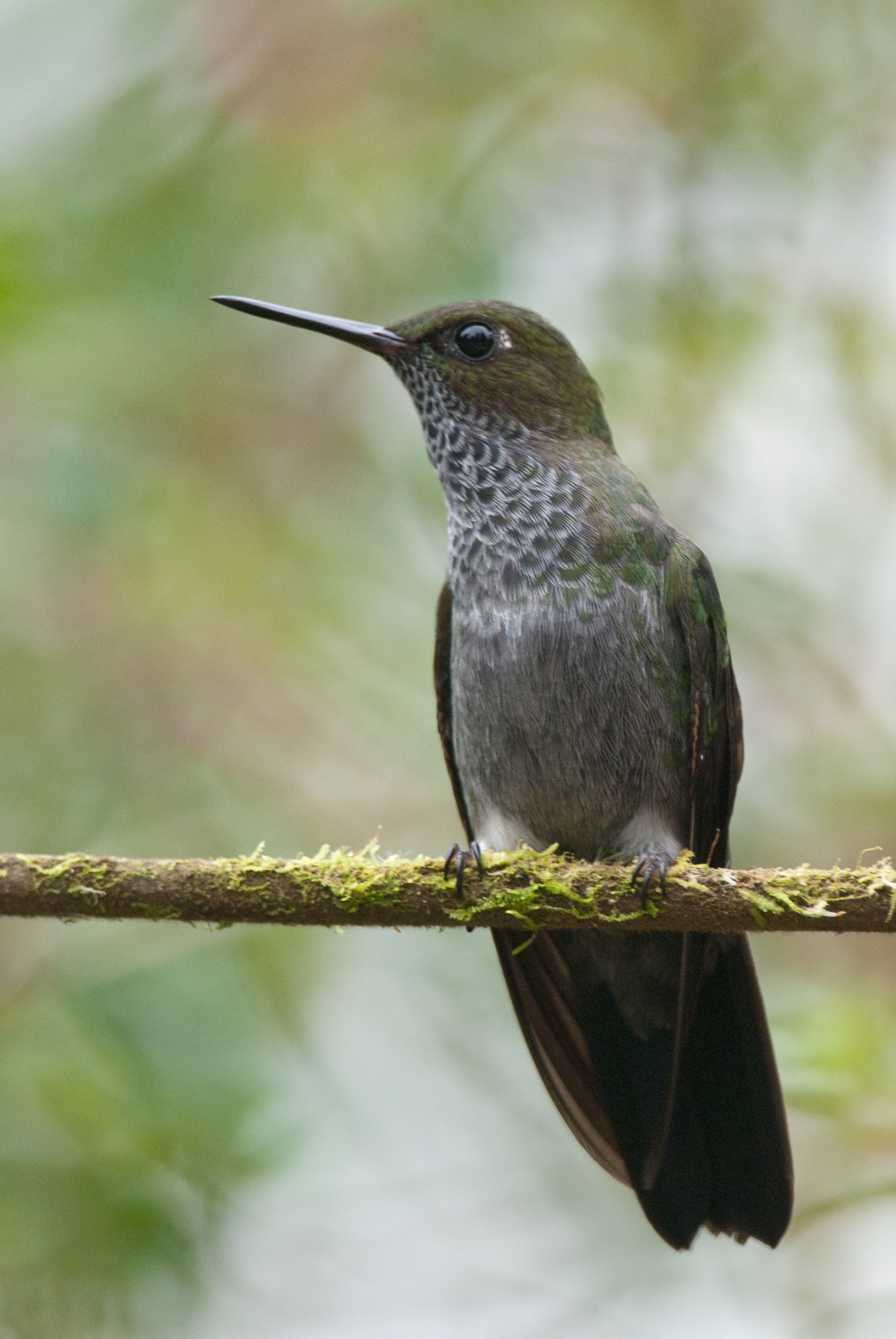

Conservation status
- Near Threatened (IUCN 3.1)
- CITES Appendix II

Scientific classification
- Kingdom: Animalia
- Phylum: Chordata
- Class: Aves
- Order: Apodiformes
- Family: Trochilidae
- Genus: Haplophaedia
- Species: H. lugens

Binomial name
- Haplophaedia lugens (Gould, 1852)

= Hoary puffleg =

Species of hummingbird

The hoary puffleg (Haplophaedia lugens) is a species of hummingbird in the "brilliants", tribe Heliantheini in subfamily Lesbiinae. It is found in Colombia and Ecuador.

== Taxonomy and systematics ==
The hoary puffleg is monotypic.

== Description ==
The hoary puffleg is 9 to 10 cm (3.5 to 3.9 in) long and weighs 5 to 6 g (0.18 to 0.21 oz). It has a straight black bill. Males have bronze-green upperparts with a coppery hue on the crown and rump. The underparts are dark gray with a whitish scaly appearance on the throat and breast and a greenish sheen on the flanks. The leg puffs are white on the outside and chestnut on the inside. The slightly forked tail is blackish. Females are similar but duller overall and their leg puffs are entirely white. Juveniles resemble females.

== Distribution and habitat ==
The hoary puffleg is found in a fairly narrow band on the Pacific slope of the Andes, from southwestern Colombia's Nariño Department south into Ecuador as far as Pichincha Province. It inhabits cloudforest, the borders of other types of tropical and subtropical forest, and scrublands. It tends to stay in low dense vegetation, often near streams. In Colombia it has been recorded between elevations of 1,200 and 2,000 m (3,900 and 6,600 ft) and locally as high as 2,500 m (8,200 ft). In Ecuador records span from 1,525 to 2,100 m (5,000 to 6,900 ft).

== Behavior ==
=== Movement ===
The hoary puffleg is a year-round resident throughout its range.

=== Feeding ===
The hoary puffleg forages for nectar mostly near the ground but occasionally in the canopy. It is territorial and defends clusters of flowers. It typically feeds on flowers with short corollas such as Besleria sp., Palicourea sp., Thibaudia sp., Melastomataceae, and Marantaceae. In addition to nectar, it feeds on insects that it gleans from leaves.

=== Breeding ===
The hoary puffleg's breeding season has not been well defined, but nesting has been recorded in May and August. The nest is a hanging cup or ball made of moss and spiderweb; it is attached to the underside of a fern or other large leaf that protects it from rain. It is typically 0.5 to 2 m (2 to 7 ft) above the ground. The female incubates the clutch of two white eggs for 15 to 17 days and fledging occurs 20 to 24 days after hatch.

=== Vocalization ===
Only one hoary puffleg vocalization has been described, "a single strident 'tzik' or doubled 'tsi-tsik', repeated at irregular intervals". It is given both from a perch and in flight.

== Status ==
The IUCN originally assessed the hoary puffleg as Threatened but since 2004 has rated it as Near Threatened. It has a very small range; its population size is not known and is believed to be decreasing. It is found in a few protected areas but "suitable habitat is rapidly disappearing due to extensive deforestation."
