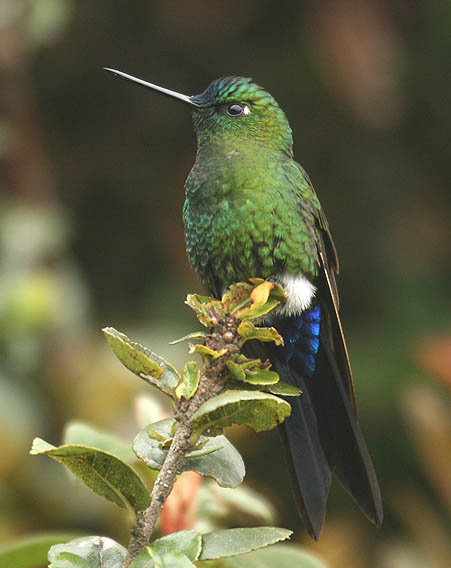
- Eriocnemis luciani

Scientific classification
- Kingdom: Animalia
- Phylum: Chordata
- Class: Aves
- Order: Apodiformes
- Family: Trochilidae
- Tribe: Heliantheini
- Genus: Eriocnemis; Reichenbach, 1849

Type species
- Eriopus simplex Gould, 1849

Species
- see text.

= Eriocnemis =

Genus of birds

Eriocnemis is a genus of hummingbirds, which - together with the species in the genus Haplophaedia - are known as pufflegs. They occur in humid forest, woodland and shrub at elevations of 1000 to 4800 meters above sea level in the Andes of Argentina, Bolivia, Peru, Ecuador, Colombia, and Venezuela. The males have a colourful green, coppery or blue plumage, and the females are generally somewhat duller. The most striking feature of both sexes in the genus Eriocnemis are their dense snow-white leg-puffs which consist of feather tufts that resemble woolly panties. One species, the black-thighed puffleg - is characterized by black coloured leg-puffs. Most have a contrasting blue, purple or coppery-red vent, but this is green in the black-thighed and emerald-bellied puffleg. Further common features of all species are the straight black bill and the slightly to deeply forked tail. The genus name was coined by the German naturalist Ludwig Reichenbach who called them Snowy panties.

While most members of this genus remain fairly common, three species (colorful puffleg, black-breasted puffleg and gorgeted puffleg) are critically endangered and one (the turquoise-throated puffleg) is possibly extinct.

== Taxonomy ==
The genus Eriocnemis was introduced in 1849 by German naturalist Ludwig Reichenbach. Reichenbach provided a diagnostic drawing of the bill and another of the legs but did not list any species within the genus. The type species was defined in 1852 when John Gould published a colored plate with accompanying text where he placed his previously described species Eriopus simplex in the genus Eriocnemis. Gould's name is a junior synonym of Trochilus cuprioventris Fraser, the coppery-bellied puffleg. The genus name combines the Ancient Greek εριον/erion meaning "wool" with κνημις/knēmis, κνημιδος/knēmidos meaning "boot" or "legging".

== Species ==
The genus contains 11 species:

Genus Eriocnemis – Reichenbach, 1849 – eleven species
Common name	Scientific name and subspecies	Range	Size and ecology	IUCN status and estimated population
Black-breasted puffleg	Eriocnemis nigrivestis (Bourcier & Mulsant, 1852)	Ecuador	Size: Habitat: Diet:	EN
Gorgeted puffleg	Eriocnemis isabellae Cortés-Diago, Ortega, Mazariegos-Hurtado & Weller, 2007	Colombia	Size: Habitat: Diet:	CR
Glowing puffleg	Eriocnemis vestita (Lesson, 1839) Four subspecies: E. v. paramillo (Chapman, 1917); E. v. vestita (Lesson, 1838); E. v. smaragdinipectus Gould, 1868; E. v. arcosae Schuchmann, Weller, & Heynen, 2001	Colombia, Ecuador, Peru, and Venezuela	Size: Habitat: Diet:	LC
Black-thighed puffleg	Eriocnemis derbyi (Delattre & Bourcier, 1846)	Colombia and Ecuador	Size: Habitat: Diet:	NT
Turquoise-throated puffleg	Eriocnemis godini (Bourcier, 1851)	Ecuador	Size: Habitat: Diet:	CR
Coppery-bellied puffleg	Eriocnemis cupreoventris (Fraser, 1840)	Colombia and Venezuela	Size: Habitat: Diet:	NT
Sapphire-vented puffleg	Eriocnemis luciani (Bourcier, 1847) Five subspecies: E. l. meridae Schuchmann, Weller, & Heynen, 2001; E. l. luciani (Bourcier, 1847); E. l. baptistae Schuchmann, Weller, & Heynen, 2001; E. l. catharina Salvin, 1897; Coppery-naped puffleg Taczanowski, 1874	Colombia, Ecuador, Peru, and possibly Venezuela	Size: Habitat: Diet:	LC
Golden-breasted puffleg	Eriocnemis mosquera (Delattre & Bourcier, 1846)	Colombia and Ecuador.	Size: Habitat: Diet:	LC
Blue-capped puffleg	Eriocnemis glaucopoides (d'Orbigny & Lafresnaye, 1838)	Argentina and Bolivia.	Size: Habitat: Diet:	LC
Colorful puffleg	Eriocnemis mirabilis Meyer de Schauensee, 1967	Colombia	Size: Habitat: Diet:	CR
Emerald-bellied puffleg	Eriocnemis aline (Bourcier, 1843)	Colombia, Ecuador, and Peru	Size: Habitat: Diet:	LC

In addition there were the controversial species: Eriocnemis söderströmi, E. isaacsoni and E. dyselius which were each only known by one specimen. In the case of E. söderströmi it could have been either the female of E. godini or a hybrid between E. luciani and E. nigrivestris. E. dyselius was nothing more than a melanistic individual of E. cupreoventris. Today these species are considered invalid.
