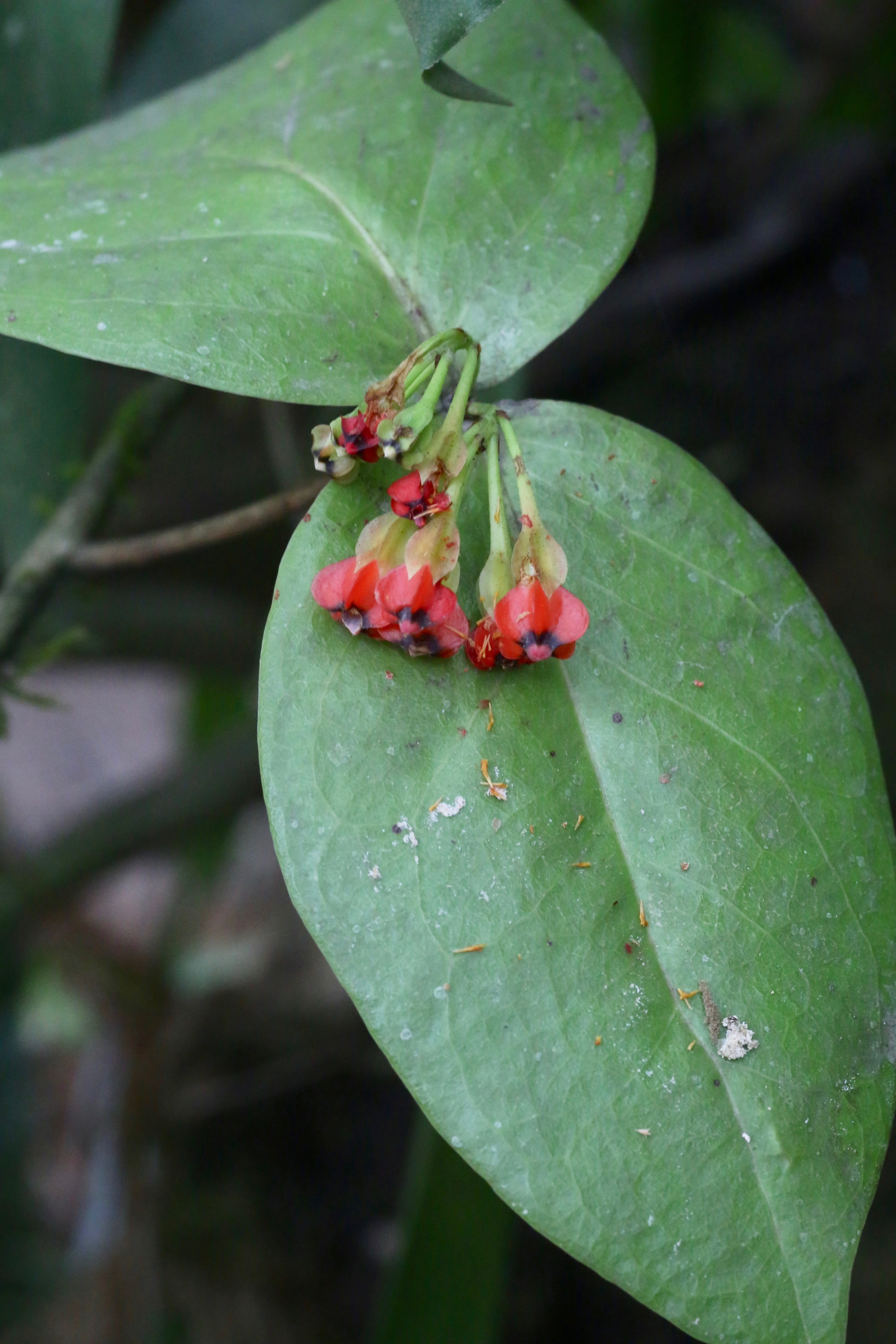
- Anthopterus wardii

Scientific classification
- Kingdom: Plantae
- Clade: Tracheophytes
- Clade: Angiosperms
- Clade: Eudicots
- Clade: Asterids
- Order: Ericales
- Family: Ericaceae
- Tribe: Vaccinieae
- Genus: Anthopterus; Hook.

Type species
- Anthopterus racemosus Hook.

Synonyms
- Thibaudia subg. Anthopterus (Hook.) Hoerold

= Anthopterus =

Genus of flowering plants

Anthopterus is a genus of flowering plants in the family Ericaceae native to the region from Costa Rica to Peru.

== Taxonomy ==
It was described by William Jackson Hooker in 1839 with Anthopterus racemosus Hook. as the type species.

=== Etymology ===
The generic name Anthopterus is derived from the Greek anthos meaning flower and pteron meaning wing.

=== Species ===
It has 12 species:

- Anthopterus costaricensis Luteyn
- Anthopterus cuneatus A.C.Sm.
- Anthopterus ecuadorensis Luteyn
- Anthopterus gentryi Luteyn
- Anthopterus molaui (Luteyn) Luteyn
- Anthopterus oliganthus A.C.Sm.
- Anthopterus pterotus (A.C.Sm.) Luteyn
- Anthopterus racemosus Hook.
- Anthopterus revolutus (Wilbur & Luteyn) Luteyn
- Anthopterus schultzeae (Sleumer) Luteyn
- Anthopterus verticillatus Luteyn
- Anthopterus wardii Ball
