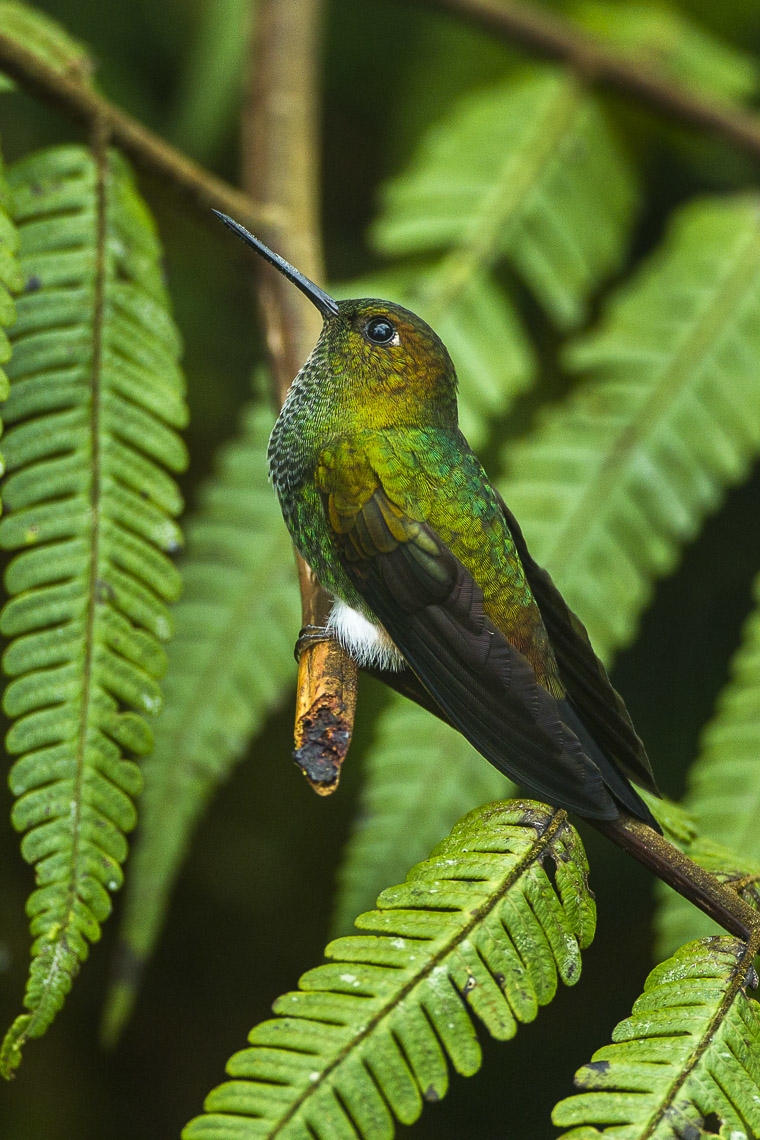

Conservation status
- Least Concern (IUCN 3.1)
- CITES Appendix II

Scientific classification
- Kingdom: Animalia
- Phylum: Chordata
- Class: Aves
- Order: Apodiformes
- Family: Trochilidae
- Genus: Haplophaedia
- Species: H. aureliae

Binomial name
- Haplophaedia aureliae (Bourcier & Mulsant, 1846)

= Greenish puffleg =

Species of hummingbird

The greenish puffleg (Haplophaedia aureliae) is a species of hummingbird in the "brilliants", tribe Heliantheini in subfamily Lesbiinae. It is found in Colombia, Ecuador, Panama, and Peru.

== Taxonomy and systematics ==
An early author included Haplophaedia in genus Eriocnemis but later work confirmed that they are separate sister genera.

The greenish puffleg has six recognized subspecies (but see the text below the list):

- H. a. floccus Nelson (1912)
- H. a. galindoi Wetmore (1967)
- H. a. caucensis Simon (1911)
- H. a. aureliae Bourcier & Mulsant (1846)
- H. a. russata Gould (1871)
- H. a. cutucuensis Schuchmann, Weller, & Heynen (2000)

The taxonomy of this species is unsettled. H. a. russata has sometimes been treated as a separate species. H. a. floccus and H. a. galindoi have sometimes been included in H. a. caucensis. The two subspecies of buff-thighed puffleg (H. assimilis) were originally included in H. aureliae, then split from it. As of early 2022 H. assimilis is under consideration for reinclusion in aureliae but the proposal does not have much support. The greenish and buff-thighed pufflegs are now treated as sister species.

== Description ==
The greenish puffleg is 9 to 11.6 cm (3.5 to 4.6 in) long and weighs 4 to 6.5 g (0.14 to 0.23 oz). Males of the nominate subspecies have green upperparts with a coppery hue on the head and neck. The underparts are duller green with a grayish white scaly appearance. The leg puffs are white on the outside and buff on the inside. The slightly forked tail is blue-black. Females are similar but their underparts are more heavily scaled and their leg puffs entirely white. Juveniles resemble females.

Subspecies H. a. caucensis has grass green upperparts with a more intense coppery tinge on the head and rump than the nominate, and also a white patch on the belly. Males of H. a. floccus are similar to caucensis but with paler green underparts and less of a coppery tinge on the upperparts, but in addition bright cinnamon uppertail coverts. The female's foreneck and breast have prominent white scaling. Males of H. a. galindoi are darker green above and below compared to floccus and the scaling of females' underparts is more muted. H. a. russata has a longer bill and brighter copper upperparts than the nominate and its underparts are scaled brown rather than grayish white. H. a. cutucuensis is like the nominate but with much heavier grayish white scaling on the underparts.

== Distribution and habitat ==
The subspecies of the greenish puffleg are found thus:

- H. a. floccus, extreme eastern Panama and adjacent northwestern Colombia
- H. a. galindoi, Cerro Pire in extreme eastern Panama
- H. a. caucensis, from southeastern Panama into the Western and Central Andes of Colombia
- H. a. aureliae, Colombia's Eastern Andes and possibly the eastern slope of the Central Andes
- H. a. russata, the eastern slope of the Ecuadorean Andes as far south as Pastaza Province
- H. a. cutucuensis, from the eastern slope of the southern Ecuadorean Andes into Peru to the border of Amazonas and San Martín departments

The South American Classification Committee (SACC) of the American Ornithological Society and the Clements taxonomy include Peru in the species' range but the International Ornithological Committee (IOC) does not.

== Behavior ==
=== Movement ===
The greenish puffleg possibly makes seasonal elevational movements.

=== Feeding ===
The greenish puffleg forages for nectar mostly in the lower levels of the forest but will go to the canopy to feed at flowering Inga trees. It is territorial and defends clusters of flowers. In addition to nectar, it feeds on insects that it gleans from leaves.

=== Breeding ===
The greenish puffleg's breeding season appears to be from December to March but nesting activity has been recorded in other months as well. The female builds a cup nest of moss and cobwebs lined with fine plant material and suspends it below a large leaf that provides protection from rain. It is usually within about 2 m (7 ft) of the ground. The female incubates the clutch of two eggs; incubation time and time to fledging are not known.

=== Vocalization ===
Groups of male greenish pufflegs sing from high perches, "endlessly repeating a double-noted 'tur seet' or 'tskut'".

== Status ==
The IUCN has assessed the greenish puffleg as being of Least Concern. Though its population size is not known, it is believed to be stable. The various subspecies range from generally uncommon to common and locally abundant.
