= Blue-capped puffleg =

- Female, Jujuy, Argentina
- Male, Jujuy, Argentina

Conservation status
- Least Concern (IUCN 3.1)
- CITES Appendix II

Scientific classification
- Kingdom: Animalia
- Phylum: Chordata
- Class: Aves
- Order: Apodiformes
- Family: Trochilidae
- Genus: Eriocnemis
- Species: E. glaucopoides

Binomial name
- Eriocnemis glaucopoides (d'Orbigny & Lafresnaye, 1838)

Synonyms
- Eriocnemis dorbignyi

Species of hummingbird

The blue-capped puffleg (Eriocnemis glaucopoides) is a species of hummingbird in the "brilliants", tribe Heliantheini in subfamily Lesbiinae. It is found in Argentina and Bolivia.

== Taxonomy and systematics ==
The blue-capped puffleg is monotypic.

== Description ==
The blue-capped puffleg is 9 to 13 cm (3.5 to 5.1 in) long and weighs 4.0 to 4.5 g (0.14 to 0.16 oz). It has a straight black bill. The male has dark green upperparts with a dark glittering blue forehead. Its underparts are mostly golden green, with a bluish green lower breast and shining purplish blue undertail coverts. Its leg puffs are white. The tail is long, forked, and blue-black. The female's upperparts are also dark green but without the blue forehead. Its throat, breast, and belly are bright cinnamon-buff and the undertail coverts have pale buff fringes. The female's tail is less deeply forked than the male's.

== Distribution and habitat ==
The blue-capped puffleg is the southernmost representative of its genus. It is found from Bolivia's La Paz and Cochabamba departments south into northwestern Argentina's Salta and Tucumán provinces. It generally inhabits humid slopes of grass and dense shrubs and the edges of cloudforest. In Argentina it also occurs in somewhat dryer landscapes. In elevation it ranges from 1,500 to 3,400 m (4,900 to 11,200 ft) but is most common between 2,000 to 2,500 m (6,600 to 8,200 ft).

== Behavior ==
=== Movement ===
The blue-capped puffleg is generally sedentary. However, it is known to make seasonal elevational movements in Argentina and suspected to do so in Bolivia.

=== Feeding ===
Almost nothing is known about the blue-capped puffleg's diet or feeding behavior. It has been observed taking nectar from low-growing plants.

=== Breeding ===
The blue-capped puffleg has been documented breeding in November in Bolivia but little else is known about the species' breeding phenology. The female incubates the clutch of two eggs but the incubation period and time to fledging are not known.

=== Vocalization ===
The blue-capped puffleg's vocalizations are not well known. As of early 2022, Xeno-canto and Cornell University's Macaulay Library each had a single recording. The only description of the vocalization is "a high-pitched 'zee-zee'".

== Status ==
The IUCN has assessed the blue-capped puffleg as being of Least Concern. Though its population size is not known it is believed to be stable, and no specific threats have been identified. It is considered overall to be rare but locally common and occurs in two national parks in Argentina.
