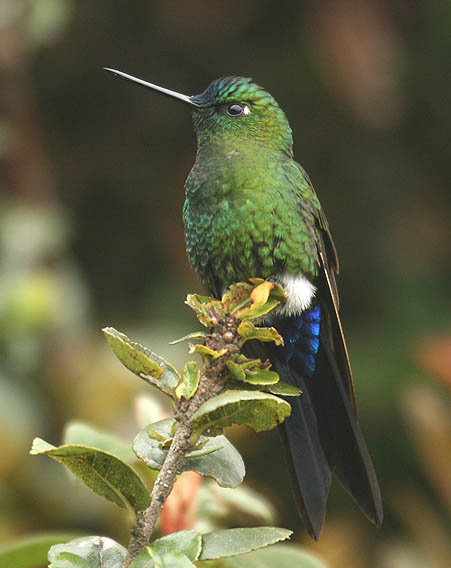

Conservation status
- Least Concern (IUCN 3.1)
- CITES Appendix II

Scientific classification
- Kingdom: Animalia
- Phylum: Chordata
- Class: Aves
- Order: Apodiformes
- Family: Trochilidae
- Genus: Eriocnemis
- Species: E. luciani

Binomial name
- Eriocnemis luciani (Bourcier, 1847)

= Sapphire-vented puffleg =

Species of hummingbird

The sapphire-vented puffleg (Eriocnemis luciani) is a species of hummingbird in the "brilliants", tribe Heliantheini in subfamily Lesbiinae. It is found in Colombia, Ecuador, Peru, and possibly Venezuela.

== Taxonomy and systematics ==
The International Ornithological Committee (IOC) and the Clements taxonomy recognize the following five subspecies of sapphire-vented puffleg.

- E. l. meridae Schuchmann, Weller, & Heynen (2001)
- E. l. luciani Bourcier (1847)
- E. l. baptistae Schuchmann, Weller, & Heynen (2001)
- E. l. catharina Salvin (1897)
- E. l. sapphiropygia Taczanowski (1874)

BirdLife International's Handbook of the Birds of the World accepts several 21st century studies and treats the last two as members a separate species, the coppery-naped puffleg (E. sapphiropygia). The South American Classification Committee (SACC) of the American Ornithological Society declined to recognize that split.

Subspecies E. l. meridae is known only from the holotype that was collected in 1898, and it might be extinct.

== Description ==
The sapphire-vented puffleg is 11.4 to 14 cm (4.5 to 5.5 in) long and weighs 5.4 to 6.4 g (0.19 to 0.23 oz). It has a straight black bill. The nominate subspecies' male has metallic grass green upperparts with a shining dark blue forecrown. Its underparts are mostly glittering golden green with a glittering purple vent and undertail coverts. Its leg puffs are white and the tail is deeply forked and blue-black. The female is slightly smaller, with a less deeply forked tail, but has the same plumage.

Subspecies E. l. meridae is a more bronzy green than the nominate, its chin emerald to golden, and much of its head feathering has iridescent copper fringes. E. l. baptistae is an even deeper bronzy green than meridae. E. l. catharina has upperparts like the nominate but without the blue forecrown. The male's belly is bluer and the centerof the female's belly is whitish. E. l. sapphiropygia is a lighter green than the nominate, lacks the nominate's blue forecrown, and has a bronzy or coppery tinge to the rear of the crown.

== Distribution and habitat ==
The subspecies of sapphire-vented puffleg are found thus (but see the text below):

- E. l. meridae, Paramo Conejos in western Venezuela's Mérida state
- E. l. luciani, the Andes from Nariño Department in southwestern Colombia south through western Ecuador into Cotopaxi Province
- E. l. baptistae, central Ecuador's Andes from Chimborazo Province to Azuay Province
- E. l. catharina, the Utcubamba River valley of northern Peru's eastern Andes
- E. l. sapphiropygia, the eastern Andes of central and southern Peru from Department of La Libertad to Department of Puno

Because E. l. meridae is known only from a single 19th century specimen and might be extinct, the SACC does not include Venezuela in the species' range. The SACC also notes that the species has been recorded as hypothetical (with "no tangible evidence") in Bolivia. There are several gaps in the distribution along the Andes that have not been explained.

The sapphire-vented puffleg inhabits humid montane forest, especially elfin forest and Polylepis woodlands, and is also found in brushy páramo. In Ecuador it ranges between 2,700 and 3,700 m (8,900 and 12,100 ft) of elevation, but occurs mostly below 3,400 m (11,200 ft). In Peru it occurs between 2,400 and 3,500 m (7,900 and 11,500 ft).

== Behavior ==
=== Feeding ===
The sapphire-vented puffleg forages for nectar at low levels, where it clings to the flowers of shrubs and understory plants. It has been documented feeding at mistletoes and also plants of genera Barnadesia, Embothrium, Bomarea, and Siphocampylus. It also feeds on small insects like other hummingbirds.

=== Breeding ===
Little is known about the sapphire-vented puffleg's breeding phenology. The one described nest was made of moss, lichen, fern leaves, and spiderweb and was hung from a thin twig in dense grass. It contained two white eggs.

=== Vocalization ===
The sapphire-vented puffleg's call is described as a "sharp tirr tirr".

== Status ==
The IUCN follows HBW taxonomy and so assesses the sapphire-vented and "coppery-naped" pufflegs separately. Both are assessed as being of Least Concern. Their population sizes are not known but are believed to be stable. No specific threats have been identified. The species is variously described as uncommon to locally very common, and "[h]uman activity has little short-term direct effect on Sapphire-vented Puffleg, other than the local effects of habitat destruction".
