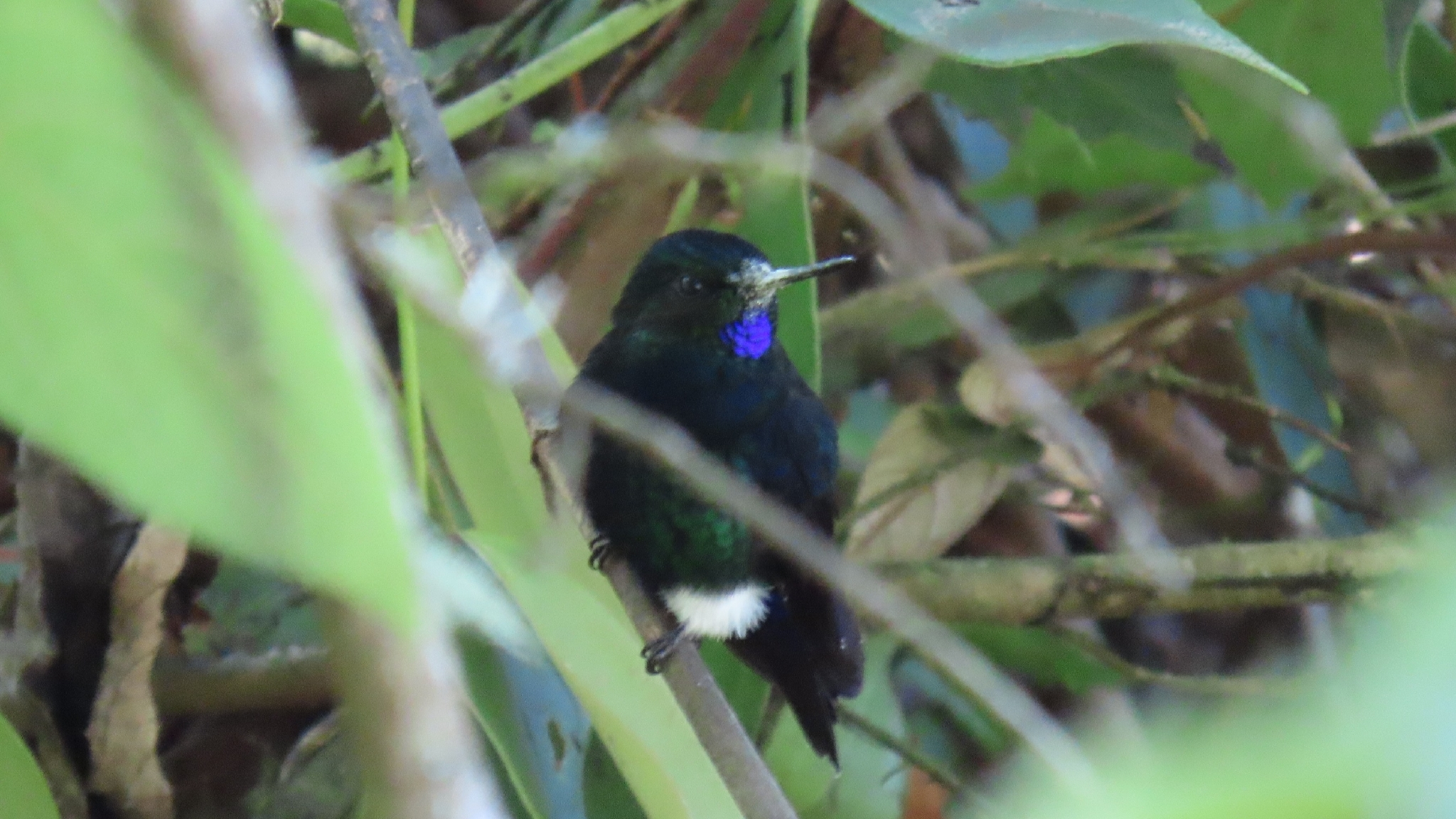

Conservation status
- Endangered (IUCN 3.1)
- CITES Appendix II

Scientific classification
- Kingdom: Animalia
- Phylum: Chordata
- Class: Aves
- Order: Apodiformes
- Family: Trochilidae
- Genus: Eriocnemis
- Species: E. nigrivestis

Binomial name
- Eriocnemis nigrivestis (Bourcier & Mulsant, 1852)

= Black-breasted puffleg =

Species of bird

The black-breasted puffleg (Eriocnemis nigrivestis), known as zamarrito pechinegro in Spanish, is a species of hummingbird native to Ecuador. It is Endangered, with an estimated 100–150 individuals remaining in the wild.

== Description ==
The species reaches a length of 8–9 cm. It is sexually dimorphic, with the male having black upper- and underparts, dark blue tail coverts, and a violet-blue throat and undertail-coverts. The female is bronze-green above, bluish-green on rump and uppertail-coverts, golden-green underparts and a pale blue chin. Both sexes have a straight black bill, a forked tail and white pufflegs, from which the common name is derived.

Fledglings are sexually dimorphic similar to adults, but with duller coloring and red-orange color on the lower part of the bill.

There is no characteristic vocalization; the species is generally quite silent, but may emit a monotonous and metallic "tseet tseet tseet" when it flies away. Juveniles emit a high-pitched chirp when begging for food.

== Distribution and habitat ==
The black-breasted puffleg is endemic to north-western Ecuador, where it currently appears restricted to the ridge crests of the Pichincha Volcano, the Cordillera de Toisán, Esmeraldas and Imbabura. Based on possible sightings in 1983 and 2010, it may still occur on Atacazo. Unconfirmed sightings exist for several other locations. It may be seen on the Reserva Yanacocha, just outside of Quito, managed by the Fundación Jocotoco. The species occurs in humid and wet cloud and montane forest at altitudes of 1,700–3,500 m. It may also be found in shrubby forest borders and stunted vegetation.

The birds are altitudinal migrants, generally being found at altitudes of 2440–3050 m between April and September, but remaining above 3100 m during the breeding season from November to February, although more recent observations suggest that migration patterns may fluctuate or change.

The black-breasted puffleg's response to microhabitats variations is extremely sensitive. It has been suggested that the species is under competitive disadvantage for the same ecological niche with others hummingbird species, specifically the gorgeted sunangel, and that avoidance of forest borders is used to mitigate the stress imposed by the seasonal altitudinal migrations.

== Ecology ==
Like most hummingbirds, the species primarily feeds on nectar and insects. It feeds on a variety of blooms, including ericaceous trees, fuchsias, and bromeliads, but shows a preference for Palicourea, especially Palicourea fuchsioides, a rare plant endemic to Ecuador.

Breeding occurs between November and April. Males establish territories and perform courtship displays. Courtship consists of vertical flights by the male and female, where they join bodies 25-30 meters in the air. The nest is a cup-like shape built above ground in a well-protected area, made of moss, spider webs, and fine fibers. Juveniles are fed by the adult mother for around 2 weeks after leaving the nest, as they make exploratory flights near the nest. In their first days after leaving the nest, the adult female feeds the juveniles approximately every 5 minutes.

== Conservation ==
The species is classified as Endangered by the IUCN based on its restricted range and extremely low population numbers. A 2020 assessment estimated a total number of 100–150 individuals. Although the black-breasted puffleg has recently been rediscovered in small populations outside its main range on the Pichincha volcano, its total area of occurrence is estimated as 100 km^{2}. Of the habitat in its original range, 93–97% are considered to have been degraded or destroyed by agricultural expansion, logging and cattle grazing, and these practices remain the main threats to the species, together with natural and human-induced fires.

A primary source of habitat loss has been the construction of the Oleoducto de Crudos Pesados (OCP) for oil transportation, a route that was established through one of the last remnants of forest.

On June 23, 2005, the Municipality of Quito adopted the black-breasted puffleg as the emblem of the capital city.

In 2020, the Fundación Jocotoco started a new project with the National Geographic Society focusing on habitat enrichment, protection, and restoration for the hummingbird, in conjunction with local communities in the region.
