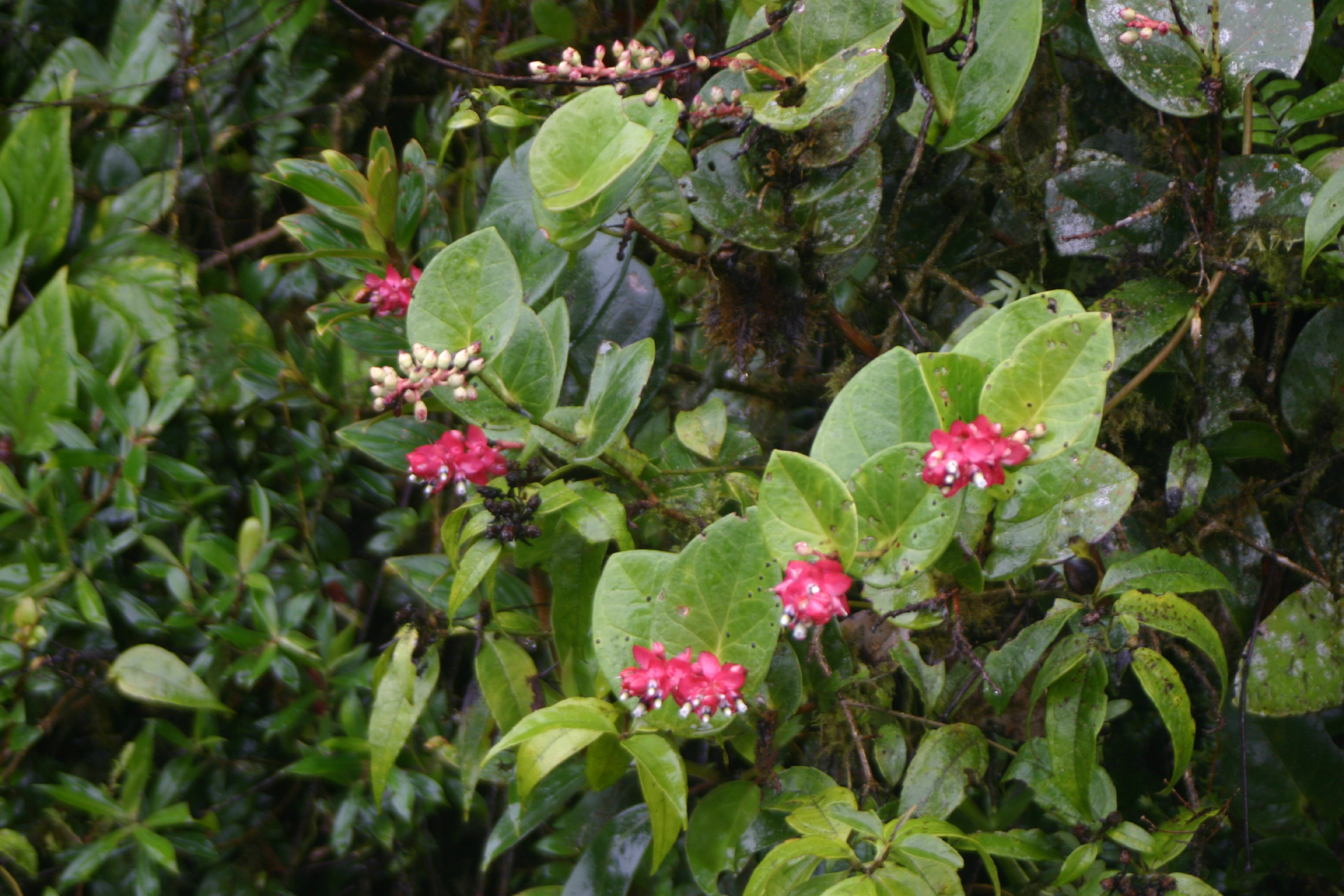
- Cavendishia complectens

Scientific classification
- Kingdom: Plantae
- Clade: Tracheophytes
- Clade: Angiosperms
- Clade: Eudicots
- Clade: Asterids
- Order: Ericales
- Family: Ericaceae
- Subfamily: Vaccinioideae
- Tribe: Vaccinieae
- Genus: Cavendishia; Lindl.

Type species
- Cavendishia nobilis

Species
- About 100

Synonyms
- Chupalon Adans.; Polyboea Klotzsch; Proclesia Klotzsch; Socratesia Klotzsch

= Cavendishia =

Genus of flowering plants

Cavendishia is a genus of about 100 species of woody perennial plants, many of which are epiphytic. The genus is native to tropical South America and Central America.

== Species ==
Image	Scientific name	Distribution
	Cavendishia aberrans Luteyn	Panama
	Cavendishia adenophora Mansf.	Colombia
	Cavendishia albopicata Luteyn	Colombia
	Cavendishia allenii A.C.Sm.	Panama
	Cavendishia amoena A.C.Sm.	Colombia.
	Cavendishia amplexa Luteyn	Colombia.
	Cavendishia angustifolia Mansf.	Colombia.
	Cavendishia antioquiensis Luteyn & Dames e Sylva	Colombia.
	Cavendishia arizonensis Luteyn	Panama.
	Cavendishia atroviolacea Luteyn	Costa Rica to Panama.
	Cavendishia aurantiaca Luteyn	Colombia
	Cavendishia awa Luteyn	Ecuador.
	Cavendishia axillaris A.C.Sm.	Costa Rica to N. Colombia
	Cavendishia barnebyi Luteyn	Colombia
	Cavendishia bomareoides A.C.Sm.	Colombia
	Cavendishia bracteata (Ruiz & Pav. ex J.St.-Hil.) Hoerold	Mexico to Bolivia.
	Cavendishia callista Donn.Sm.	Mexico, Brazil, Colombia, Costa Rica, Ecuador, French Guiana, Guatemala, Guyana, Mexico Southeast, Nicaragua, Panamá, Suriname, Venezuela
	Cavendishia calycina A.C.Sm.	Panama (Chiriquí)
	Cavendishia capitulata Donn.Sm.	Colombia, Costa Rica, Panamá
	Cavendishia caudata A.C.Sm.	Colombia
	Cavendishia chiriquiensis A.C.Sm.	Costa Rica to Panama.
	Cavendishia chlamydantha A.C.Sm.	Colombia
	Cavendishia chocoensis A.C.Sm.	Colombia.
	Cavendishia ciliata Luteyn	Costa Rica.
	Cavendishia coccinea A.C.Sm.	Colombia.
	Cavendishia colombiana Luteyn	Colombia
	Cavendishia compacta A.C.Sm.	Colombia
	Cavendishia complectens Hemsl.	Colombia, Costa Rica, Ecuador, Nicaragua, Panamá, Peru
	Cavendishia confertiflora A.C.Sm.	Costa Rica.
	Cavendishia copeensis Luteyn	Panama.
	Cavendishia corei A.C.Sm.	Colombia
	Cavendishia cuatrecasasii A.C.Sm.	Colombia to Ecuador
	Cavendishia darienensis Luteyn	Colombia, Panamá
	Cavendishia davidsei Luteyn	Costa Rica, Panamá
	Cavendishia dendrophila A.C.Sm.	Colombia
	Cavendishia divaricata A.C.Sm.	Colombia
	Cavendishia dulcis Luteyn	Colombia
	Cavendishia endresii Hemsl.	Colombia, Costa Rica, Guatemala
	Cavendishia engleriana Hoerold	Colombia, Ecuador, Peru
	Cavendishia erythrostegia Luteyn	Colombia
	Cavendishia foreroi Luteyn	Colombia
	Cavendishia fortunensis Luteyn	Panama
	Cavendishia fusiformis Luteyn	Colombia, Panamá
	Cavendishia gentryi Luteyn	Panama.
	Cavendishia glandulosa A.C.Sm.	Colombia (Antioquia).
	Cavendishia gomezii Luteyn	Costa Rica, Panamá
	Cavendishia grandifolia Herold	Ecuador
	Cavendishia grossa Luteyn	Colombia.
	Cavendishia guatapeensis Mansf.	Colombia.
	Cavendishia herrerae Luteyn & J.F.Morales	Costa Rica.
	Cavendishia isernii Sleumer	Ecuador, Peru
	Cavendishia jardinensis Luteyn	Colombia (Antioquia)
	Cavendishia lactiviscida Luteyn	Costa Rica.
	Cavendishia laurifolia (Klotzsch) Benth. & Hook.f.	Colombia, Guatemala, Mexico Southeast, Panamá
	Cavendishia lebroniae Luteyn	Ecuador.
	Cavendishia leucantha Luteyn	Colombia.
	Cavendishia limonensis Luteyn	Costa Rica.
	Cavendishia lindauiana Hoerold	Panama to Colombia.
	Cavendishia linearifolia Luteyn & J.F.Morales	Costa Rica.
	Cavendishia longirachis Luteyn	Colombia (Antioquia).
	Cavendishia luteynii J.F.Morales	Costa Rica to Panama.
	Cavendishia macrocephala A.C.Sm.	Colombia.
	Cavendishia mariae Luteyn	Colombia to Ecuador.
	Cavendishia martii (Meisn.) A.C.Sm.	Bolivia, Brazil North, Peru
	Cavendishia megabracteata Luteyn	Costa Rica to Panama.
	Cavendishia melastomoides (Klotzsch) Hemsl.	Costa Rica.
	Cavendishia micayensis A.C.Sm.	Colombia to Ecuador.
	Cavendishia morii Luteyn	Panama (Sierranía de Pirre).
	Cavendishia neblinae Maguire, Steyerm. & Luteyn	Venezuela (Amazonas).
	Cavendishia nitens Sleumer	Colombia.
	Cavendishia nitida (Kunth) A.C.Sm.	Colombia.
	Cavendishia nobilis Lindl.	Peru.
	Cavendishia nuda Luteyn	Colombia (Antioquia).
	Cavendishia oligantha A.C.Sm.	Colombia
	Cavendishia orthosepala A.C.Sm.	Ecuador.
	Cavendishia osaensis Luteyn & J.F.Morales	Costa Rica
	Cavendishia palustris A.C.Sm.	Colombia.
	Cavendishia panamensis Luteyn	Panama
	Cavendishia parviflora Luteyn	Ecuador
	Cavendishia pedicellata Luteyn	Colombia
	Cavendishia pilobracteata Luteyn	Colombia
	Cavendishia pilosa Luteyn	Colombia (Antioquia)
	Cavendishia porphyrea A.C.Sm.	Colombia
	Cavendishia pseudopedunculata Luteyn	Colombia
	Cavendishia pseudostenophylla Luteyn	Panama
	Cavendishia pubescens (Kunth) Hemsl.	Bolivia, Colombia, Ecuador, Panamá, Peru, Venezuela
	Cavendishia punctata (Ruiz & Pav. ex J.St.-Hil.) Sleumer	Peru
	Cavendishia quercina A.C.Sm.	Costa Rica, Panamá
	Cavendishia quereme (Kunth) Benth. & Hook.f.	Colombia, Costa Rica, Panamá
	Cavendishia revoluta Luteyn	Panama
	Cavendishia rhynchophylla A.C.Sm.	Colombia
	Cavendishia ruiz-teranii Luteyn	Venezuela
	Cavendishia santafeensis Luteyn	Panama
	Cavendishia sessiliflora A.C.Sm.	Colombia (Antioquia)
	Cavendishia sirensis Luteyn	Peru
	Cavendishia sophoclesioides A.C.Sm.	Colombia (Antioquia)
	Cavendishia speciosa A.C.Sm.	Colombia
	Cavendishia spicata A.C.Sm.	Colombia
	Cavendishia stenophylla A.C.Sm.	Panama
	Cavendishia subamplexicaulis A.C.Sm.	Colombia (Antioquia)
	Cavendishia subfasciculata Luteyn	Panama
	Cavendishia talamancensis Luteyn	Costa Rica
	Cavendishia tarapotana (Meisn.) Benth. & Hook.f.	Colombia, Ecuador, Peru
	Cavendishia tenella A.C.Sm.	Colombia.
	Cavendishia trujilloensis Luteyn	Venezuela
	Cavendishia tryphera A.C.Sm.	Colombia
	Cavendishia uniflora Luteyn	Colombia (Antioquia)
	Cavendishia urophylla A.C.Sm.	Colombia
	Cavendishia venosa A.C.Sm.	Colombia, Ecuador
	Cavendishia vinacea Luteyn	Colombia
	Cavendishia violacea A.C.Sm.	Colombia
	Cavendishia viridiflora Luteyn & Dames e Sylva	Colombia (Antioquia)
	Cavendishia wercklei Hoerold	Costa Rica
	Cavendishia zamorensis A.C.Sm.	Ecuador
