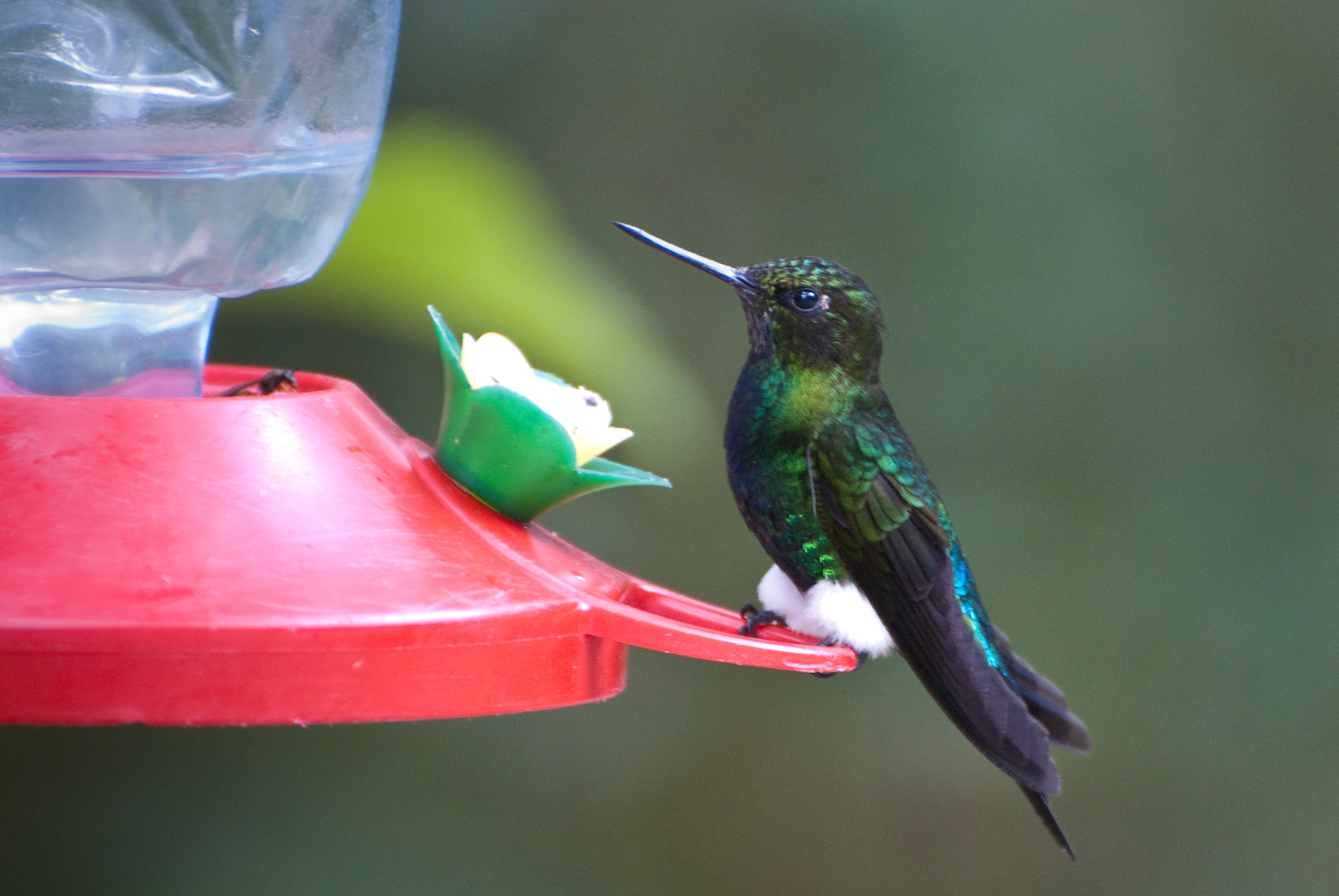

Conservation status
- Least Concern (IUCN 3.1)
- CITES Appendix II (CITES)

Scientific classification
- Kingdom: Animalia
- Phylum: Chordata
- Class: Aves
- Clade: Strisores
- Order: Apodiformes
- Family: Trochilidae
- Genus: Eriocnemis
- Species: E. vestita

Binomial name
- Eriocnemis vestita (Lesson, 1839)

= Glowing puffleg =

Species of hummingbird

The glowing puffleg (Eriocnemis vestita) is a species of hummingbird in the "brilliants", tribe Heliantheini in subfamily Lesbiinae. It is found in Colombia, Ecuador, Peru, and Venezuela.

== Taxonomy and systematics ==
The glowing puffleg has four recognized subspecies:

- E. v. paramillo Chapman (1917)
- E. v. vestita Lesson (1838)
- E. v. smaragdinipectus Gould (1868)
- E. v. arcosae Schuchmann, Weller, & Heynen (2001)

Several other subspecies have been proposed but all are now (2022) considered to be hybrids or color morphs of these four.

== Description ==
The glowing puffleg is 9 to 10 cm (3.5 to 3.9 in) long. Males weigh 3.3 to 7.2 g (0.12 to 0.25 oz) and females 3.6 to 5.3 g (0.13 to 0.19 oz). It has a straight blackish bill. The nominate subspecies' male has shining dark green upperparts with a golden green rump and uppertail coverts. It has a glittering purple throat patch thinly surrounded by golden green. The rest of its throat and its upper breast are shining blackish green, its belly glittering golden green, and its undertail coverts iridescent purplish blue. Its leg puffs are white. The tail is forked and dark steel blue. The female has shining golden green upperparts. Its throat patch is a few bluish purple discs on a buffy background. The rest of the throat and the breast are buff and the belly grayish white, all with golden green discs. The juvenile is similar to the female.

Subspecies E. v. paramillo is like the nominate but without the golden green fringe to the purple throat. Males of E. v. smaragdinipectus have the largest purple throat patch of all. E. v. arcosae is similar to smaragdinipectus but its rump and uppertail coverts are yellowish green that extends up into the lower back; males also have shorter bills and a grayer belly than the nominate.

== Distribution and habitat ==
The subspecies of glowing puffleg are found thus:

- E. v. paramillo, northern parts of Colombia's Western and Central Andes, mostly in Antioquia Department
- E. v. vestita , from northwestern Venezuela's Mérida state into the Eastern and Central Colombian Andes as far as Cundinamarca and Huila departments
- E. v. smaragdinipectus, from southern Colombia's Central Andes in Cauca Department south to Ecuador's Cañar Province
- E. v. arcosae, the Andes from southern Ecuador's Azuay Province into extreme northern Peru's departments of Piura and Cajamarca

The glowing puffleg inhabits a variety of fairly open landscapes. The edges of cloudforest and elfin forest predominate. It also occurs on brushy slopes, overgrown pastures, and páramo and occasionally in denser subtropical forest. In elevation it ranges between 2,300 and 4,200 m (7,500 and 13,800 ft) but mostly occurs between 2,800 and 3,500 m (9,200 and 11,500 ft).

== Behavior ==
=== Movement ===
The glowing puffleg is sedentary.

=== Feeding ===
The glowing puffleg feeds on nectar, usually at the flowers of low-growing shrubs with short corollas. It nectars while hovering, perching, or sometimes clinging to the flower. It is "pugnacious and territorial" at flowering plants. Its diet also includes insects and spiders taken by hawking.

=== Breeding ===
The glowing puffleg's breeding season is not well defined. At least in Colombia's Eastern Andes it appears to have nested in every month except July. The nest has not been described except that it is often built in stands of grass. The female incubates the two white eggs; the incubation period and time to fledging are not known.

=== Vocalization ===
The glowing puffleg's only described vocalization is "a single metallic note 'tseek' or doubled 'tsi-tseek', repeated at irregular intervals". It is given both from a perch and while hovering.

== Status ==
The IUCN has assessed the glowing puffleg as being of Least Concern. It has a large range, and though its population size is not known it is believed to be stable. It occurs in a few protected areas and "[r]eadily accepts secondary growth and overgrown pastures."
