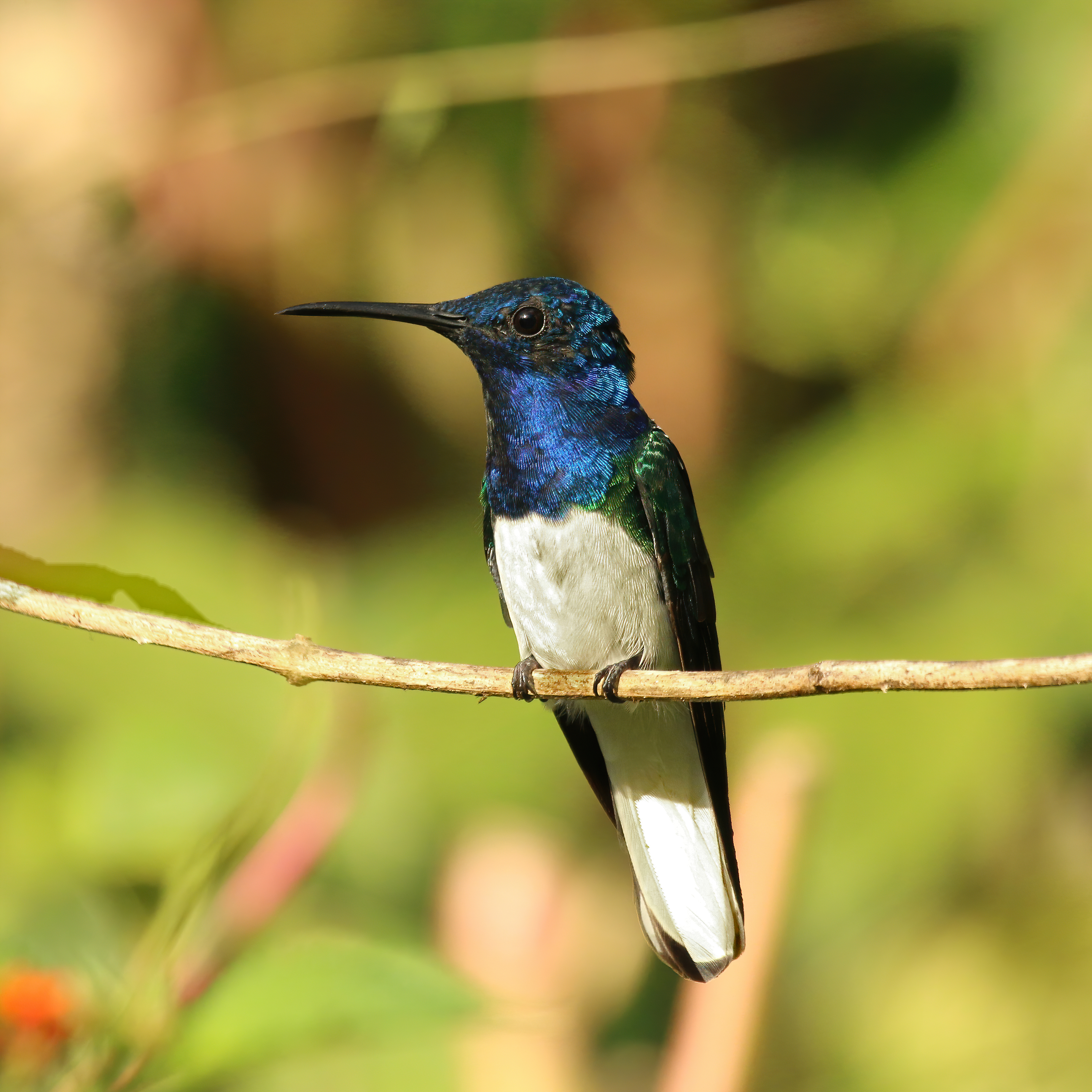
- Male white-necked jacobin (Florisuga mellivora)

Scientific classification
- Kingdom: Animalia
- Phylum: Chordata
- Class: Aves
- Order: Apodiformes
- Family: Trochilidae
- Subfamily: Florisuginae; Bonaparte, 1853

Genera
- 2, see text

= Florisuginae =

Subfamily of birds

Florisuginae is one of the six subfamilies in the hummingbird family Trochilidae.

The subfamily contains two genera, Topaza and Florisuga, which each contain two species.

== Phylogeny ==
A molecular phylogenetic study of the hummingbirds published in 2007 found that the family was composed of nine major clades. When Edward Dickinson and James Van Remsen, Jr. updated the Howard and Moore Complete Checklist of the Birds of the World for the 4th edition in 2013 they divided the hummingbirds into six subfamilies and proposed using the name Florisuginae for the clade consisting of the genera Topaza and Florisuga. The subfamily Florisuginae had originally been introduced (as Florisugeae) by the French naturalist Charles Lucien Bonaparte in 1853.

Molecular phylogenetic studies by Jimmy McGuire and collaborators published between 2007 and 2014 determined the relationships between the major groups of hummingbirds. In the cladogram below the English names are those introduced in 1997. The Latin names are those proposed by Dickinson and Remsen in 2013.

- Trochilidae
  - - Florisuginae – topazes
    - Phaethornithinae – hermits
  - - Polytminae – mangoes
    - - Lesbiinae
        - Heliantheini – brilliants
        - Lesbiini – coquettes
      - - Patagoninae – giant hummingbirds
        - Trochilinae
          - - Lampornithini – mountain gems
            - Mellisugini – bees
          - Trochilini – emeralds

== Taxonomic list ==
The subfamily contains four species.

| Image | Genus | Living species |
|---|---|---|
| | Topaza | Crimson topaz, Topaza pella; Fiery topaz, Topaza pyra |
| | Florisuga | White-necked jacobin, Florisuga mellivora; Black jacobin, Florisuga fuscus |

== Sources ==
- Dickinson, E.C.; Remsen, J.V. Jr., eds. (2013). The Howard & Moore Complete Checklist of the Birds of the World. Vol. 1: Non-passerines (4th ed.). Eastbourne, UK: Aves Press. ISBN 978-0-9568611-0-8.
