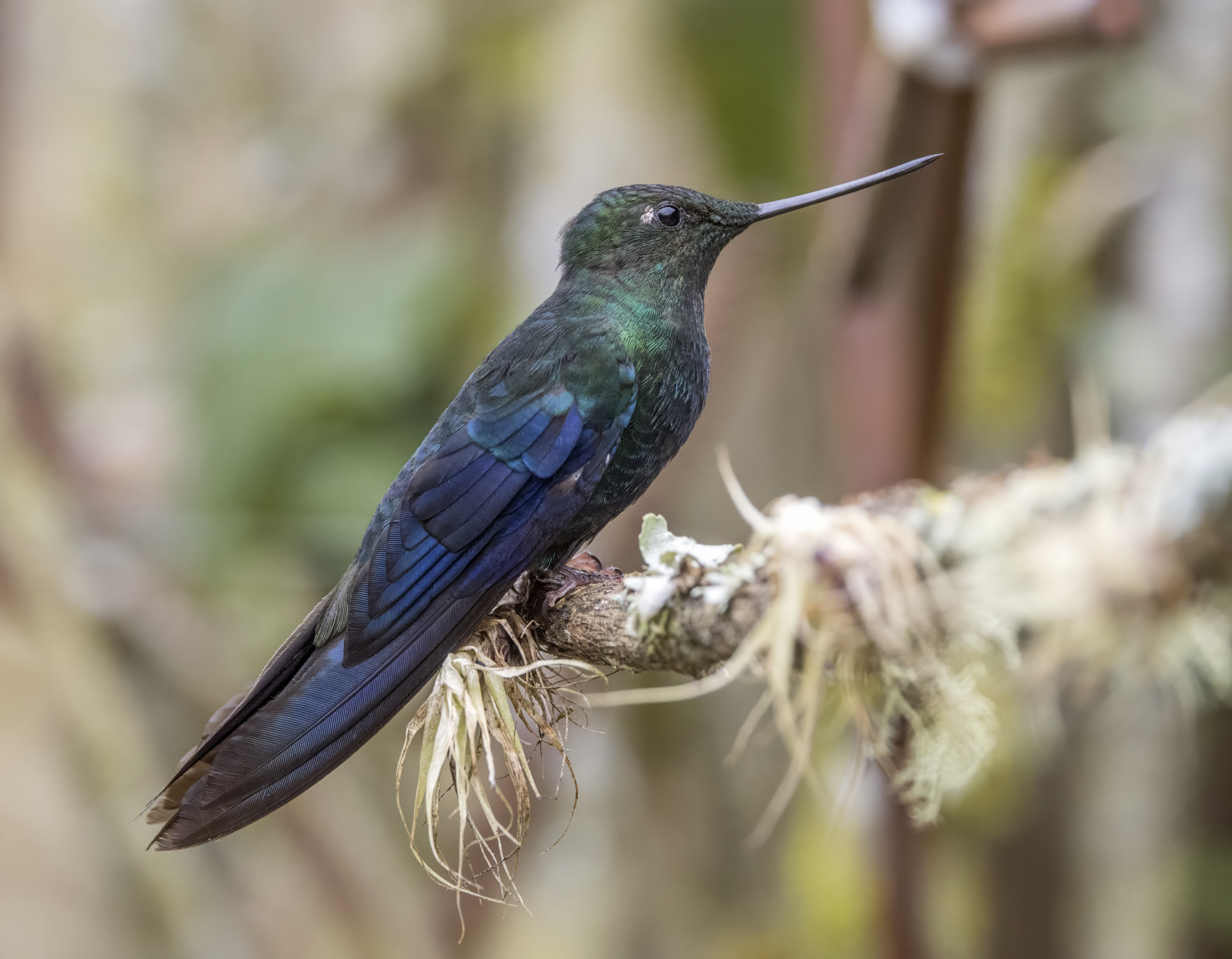
- Male Pterophanes cyanopterus caeruleus, Caldas Department, Colombia
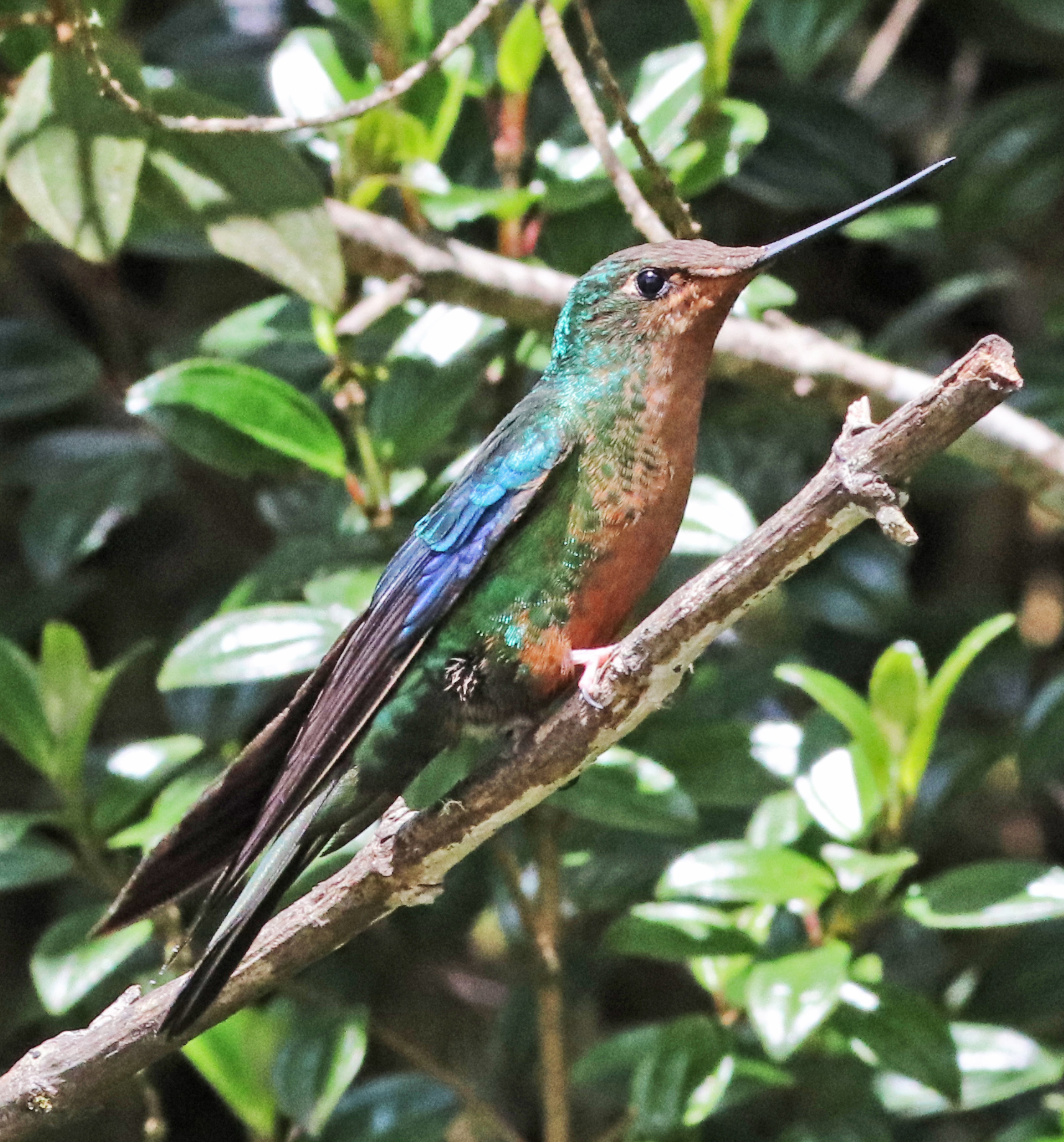
- Female in Yanacocha Reserve, Ecuador

Conservation status
- Least Concern (IUCN 3.1)
- CITES Appendix II (CITES)

Scientific classification
- Kingdom: Animalia
- Phylum: Chordata
- Class: Aves
- Clade: Strisores
- Order: Apodiformes
- Family: Trochilidae
- Tribe: Heliantheini
- Genus: Pterophanes; Gould, 1849
- Species: P. cyanopterus

Binomial name
- Pterophanes cyanopterus (Fraser, 1840)

Synonyms
- Temminck's sapphirewing Pterophanes temmincki

= Great sapphirewing =

Species of hummingbird

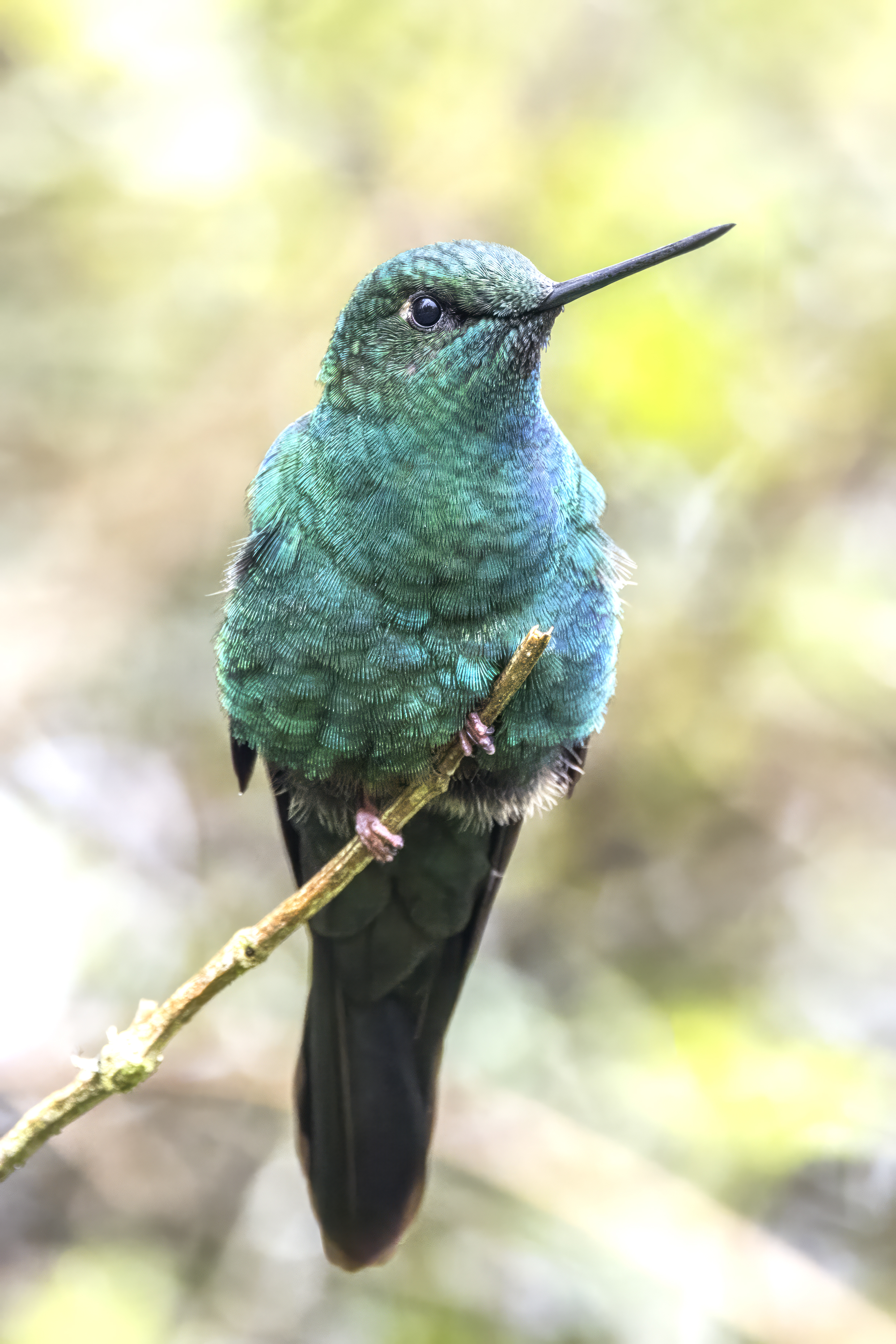
P. c. cyanopterus, Cundinamarca Department, Colombia

The great sapphirewing (Pterophanes cyanopterus) is a species of hummingbird in the "brilliants", tribe Heliantheini in subfamily Lesbiinae. It is found in Bolivia, Colombia, Ecuador, and Peru.

== Taxonomy and systematics ==
The great sapphirewing is the only member of its genus. In the late 1900s it was suggested that Pterophanes be merged into genus Coeligena, but later work showed that those genera are not closely related. The species has three subspecies, the nominate P. c. cyanopterus, P. c. caeruleus, and P. c. peruvianus.

The great sapphirewing has also been called Temminck's sapphirewing, páramo sapphirewing, and simply sapphirewing.

== Description ==
The great sapphirewing is one of the largest hummingbirds; only the two of genus Topaza and the giant hummingbird (Patagona gigas) are larger. It is 15.5 to 19 cm (6.1 to 7.5 in) long including the 3.6 cm (1.4 in) bill. Males weigh between 9.6 and 11.2 g (0.34 and 0.40 oz) and females 8.4 to 11 g (0.30 to 0.39 oz). Both sexes have a small white spot behind the eye. Males of the nominate subspecies have dark shining blue-green upperparts. The wing is mostly shining blue and the tail greenish black. The underparts are also blue-green but somewhat bluer than the upperparts. Nominate females have mostly dark metallic green upperparts with a dusky gray crown. Only the wing coverts are blue; the rest of the wing is dusky. The tail is mostly greenish black with much white on the outermost feathers. The underparts are cinnamon that is mixed with green on the sides.

Males of subspecies P. c. caeruleus have even more and darker blue than the nominate. Females also have more blue, a darker crown, and less white on the outer tail feathers. Males of P. c. peruvianus have more greenish than blue upperparts than the nominate, though the wings have about the same amount of blue. The underparts are also greenish, with a buffy belly. The female's underparts are a less intense cinnamon than the nominate's and it has more white on the outer tail feathers.

== Distribution and habitat ==
The nominate subspecies of great sapphirewing is found in Colombia's Eastern Andes, in the departments of Norte de Santander and Cundinamarca, and slightly into adjoining far western Venezuela. P. c. caeruleus is found in Colombia's Central and Western Andes. P. c. peruvianus is the most widespread; it is found from the Western Andes of Colombia south through Ecuador and Peru to Cochabamba Department in central Bolivia.

The great sapphirewing inhabits the edges of humid evergreen and elfin forest and shrubby slopes with scattered trees. It also occurs well into the páramo, at least seasonally. In Colombia it occurs between 2,600 and 3,600 m (8,500 and 11,800 ft), in Ecuador between 3,000 and 3,600 m (9,800 and 11,800 ft), in Peru between 2,600 and 3,700 m (8,500 and 12,100 ft), and in Bolivia mostly above 3,000 m (9,800 ft).

== Behavior ==
=== Movement ===
The great sapphirewing is mostly sedentary, but locally some move to lower elevations during the austral winter.

=== Feeding ===
The great sapphirewing feeds on the nectar of a wide variety of flowering plants, most of which are fairly small though some are larger. In Peru it seems to favor Tristerix longebracteatus and in the Colombian páramo Puya clava-herculis. It typically feeds at low to mid-levels of the vegetation, hovering or perching at the outside of the host plant. It usually defends patches of flowers but also forages by trap-lining, visiting a circuit of feeding sites. In addition to feeding on nectar it captures small arthropods by gleaning from foliage and by hawking.

=== Breeding ===
The great sapphirewing's breeding season is not well defined but includes at least February to May. The only known nest was an oddity, a three-compartment structure of moss lined with soft fibers. When it was discovered, a female sapphirewing was brooding two nestlings in one compartment and another was occupied by a female tyrian metaltail (Metallura tyrianthina). The third compartment was empty. The nest was about 4 m (13 ft) above ground, suspended from roots below vegetation.

=== Vocalization ===
The great sapphirewing's vocalizations include "a high, thin, liquid chatter", a "drawn-out piercing high-pitched zeee", and "[an] agitated titititirrr".

== Status ==
The IUCN has assessed the great sapphirewing as being of Least Concern. It has a large range and though its population size is unknown, it is believed to be stable. No specific threats have been identified. It is variously considered rare to locally common in different parts of its range. "It is sensitive to forest loss or fragmentation but, as a species that tolerates forest edges, it is less vulnerable than are many other species of montane forests."
