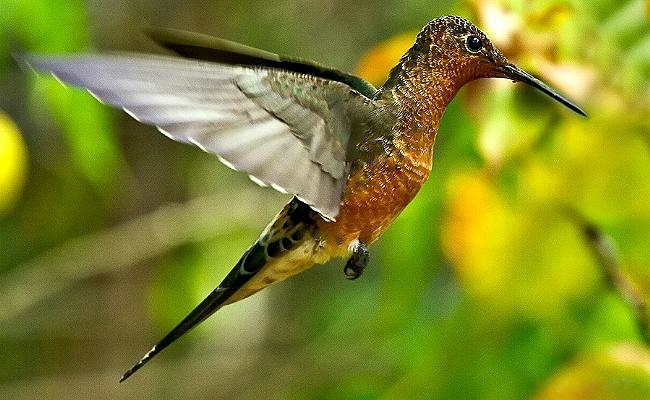
- Patagona gigas in Chile

Conservation status
- Least Concern (IUCN 3.1)
- CITES Appendix II

Scientific classification
- Kingdom: Animalia
- Phylum: Chordata
- Class: Aves
- Clade: Strisores
- Order: Apodiformes
- Family: Trochilidae
- Genus: Patagona
- Species: P. gigas

Binomial name
- Patagona gigas (Vieillot, 1824)

= Southern giant hummingbird =

Species of bird

The southern giant hummingbird (Patagona gigas) is one of two species in the genus Patagona and the second largest hummingbird species, after its close relative the northern giant hummingbird.

== Taxonomy ==
It and the sympatric northern giant hummingbird (P. peruviana) were once considered the same species, i.e., the giant hummingbird, though some researchers have already classified them as different species or subspecies in the past. Genomic analysis supports the separation of the two species which shows that they diverged between 2.1 and 3.4 million years ago, in the late Pliocene. Williamson and colleagues attributed the binomial name Patagona chaski to the northern giant hummingbird in 2024, but this taxon was already described as Patagona peruviana by Adolphe Boucard in 1893, so P. chaski is a junior synonym of P. peruviana.

== Description ==
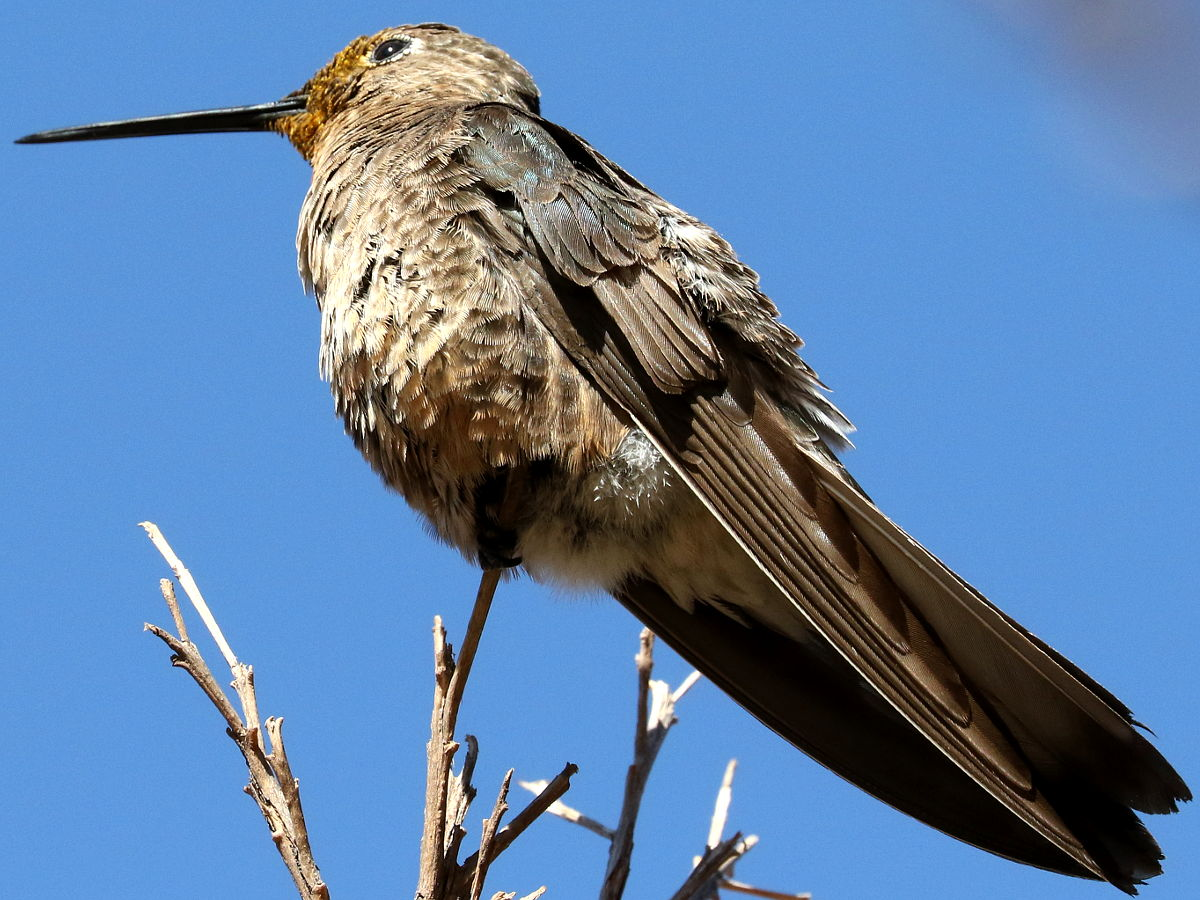
In Cusco, Peru

Its mass is in the range of 17–31 g (0.60–1.09 oz), making it approximately twice as heavy as the next largest hummingbird. It has a wingspan of 21.5 cm (8.5 in), with a body length of 23 cm (9.1 in).

The two subspecies are visually distinguishable. P. g. peruviana is yellowish brown overall and has white on the chin and throat, where P. g. gigas is more olive green to brown and lacks white on the chin and throat.

== Distribution, habitat, and migration ==
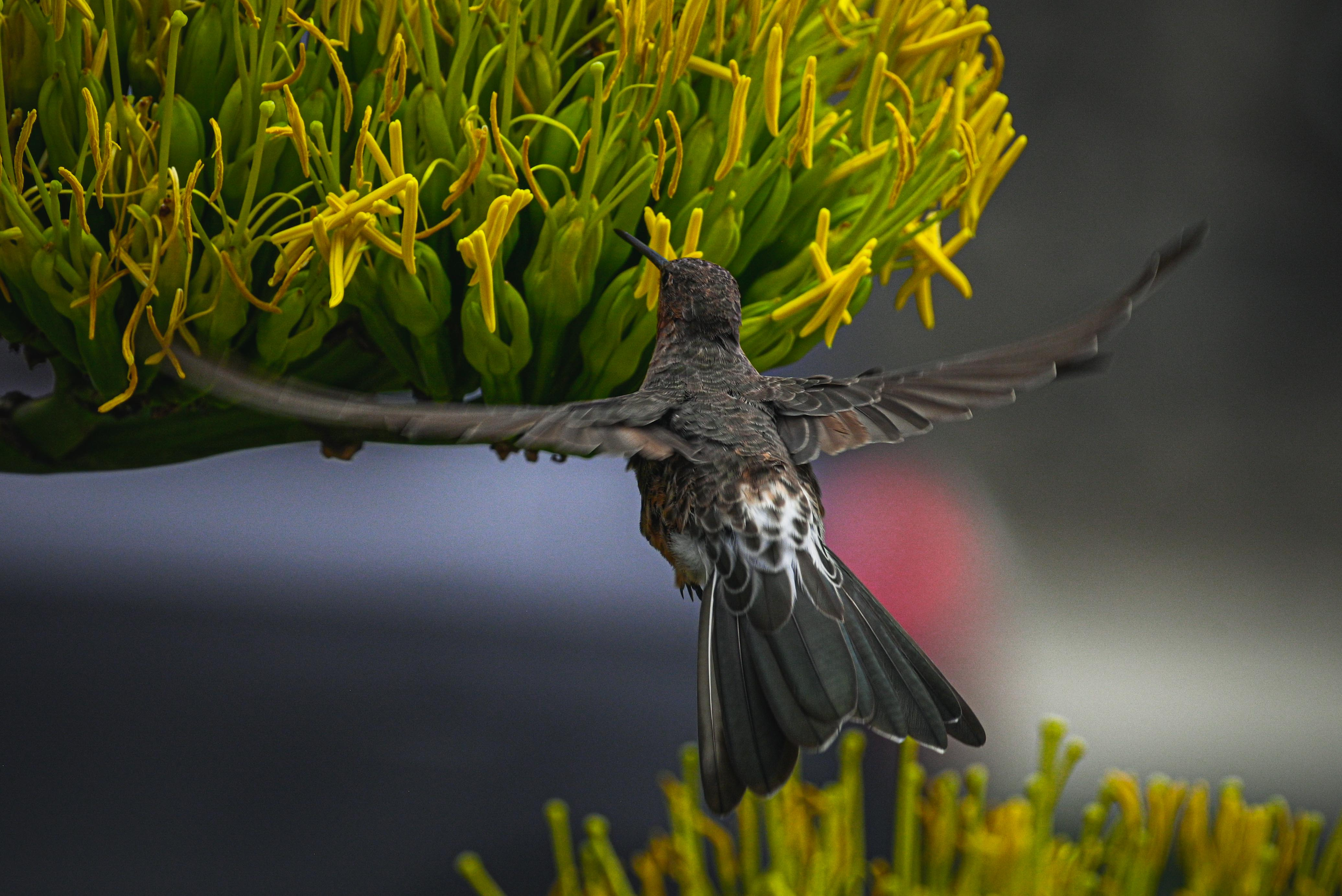
Hovering

The giant hummingbird is widely distributed throughout the length of the Andes on both the east and west sides. Its seasonal migration loop is estimated at 8,300 km (5,200 mi) over the Central Andean Plateau, involving an altitude change of about 4,100 m (13,500 ft) over a three week period.

It typically inhabits the higher altitude scrubland and forests that line the slopes of the Andes during the summer and then retreats to similar, lower altitude habitats in winter months.

The species persists through a large altitude range, with specimens retrieved from sea level up to 4,600 m (15,100 ft). They have shown to be fairly resilient to urbanisation and agricultural activities; however, the removal of vegetation limits their distribution in dense city areas and industrial zones. The giant hummingbird migrates in summer to the temperate areas of South America, reaching as low as 44° S. Correspondingly, it migrates north to more tropical climates in winter (March–August), though not usually venturing higher than 28° S.

P. g. peruviana occurs from Ecuador to the southeastern mountains of Peru and P. g. gigas from northern Bolivia and Chile to Argentina. Contact between these previously accepted subspecies is most likely to occur around the eastern slopes of the north Peruvian Andes.

== Ecology ==
P. gigas is the predominant pollinator of the cactus species Oreocereus celsianus.

== Cultural significance ==
The giant hummingbird holds significant value for some of the aboriginal inhabitants of the Andes. The people of Chiloé Island believe that if a woman captures a hummingbird then they will gain great fertility from it. This species is a likely inspiration to the people of the Nazca culture who created the Nazca hummingbird geoglyph.

== Status ==
The range of the giant hummingbird is sizable, estimated at 1,200,000 km^{2} (460,000 sq mi), with total numbers of about 65,000 estimated in Peru. The species is classified by the International Union for Conservation of Nature as being of Least Concern.
