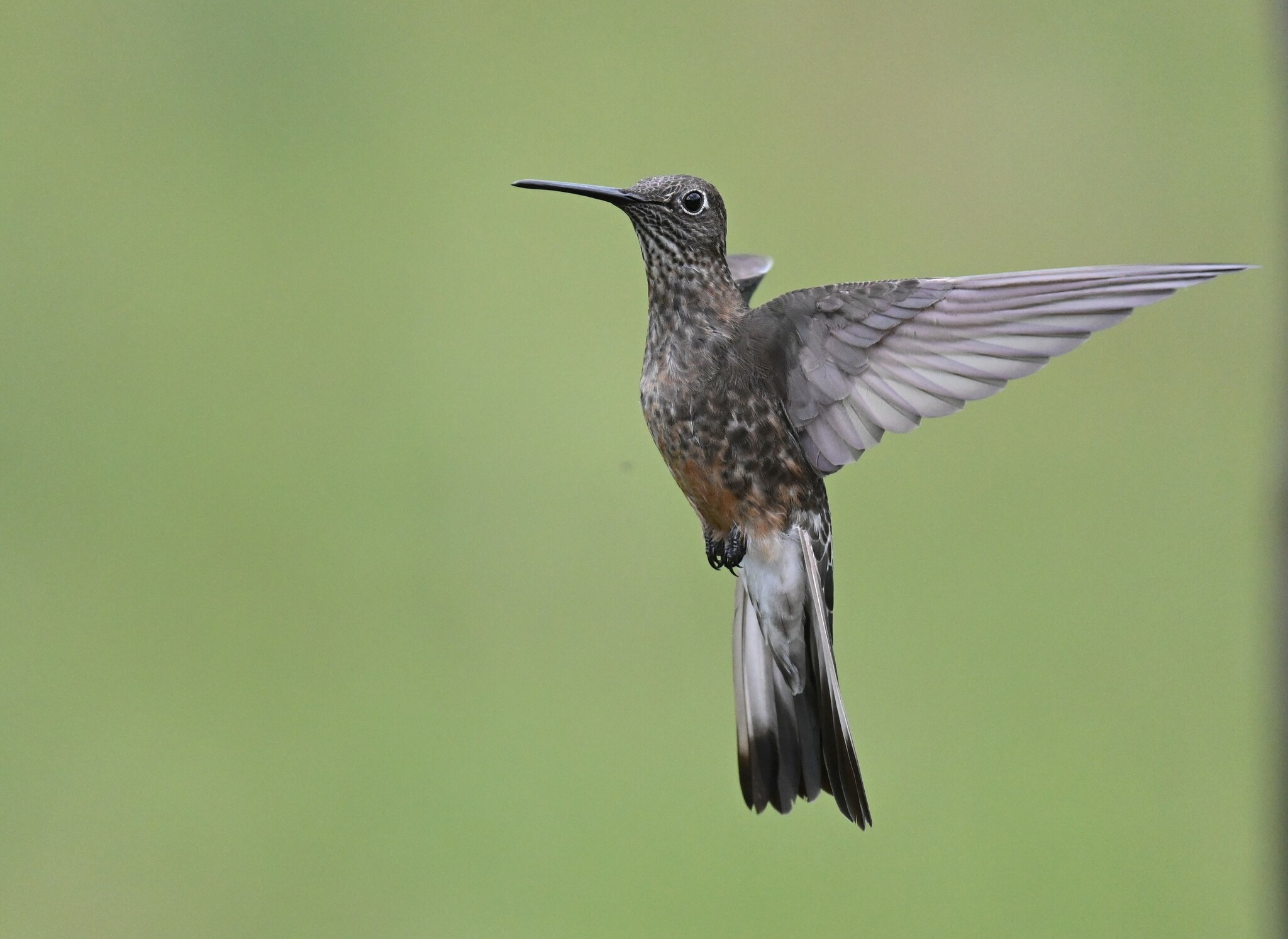

Scientific classification
- Kingdom: Animalia
- Phylum: Chordata
- Class: Aves
- Clade: Strisores
- Order: Apodiformes
- Family: Trochilidae
- Genus: Patagona
- Species: P. peruviana

Binomial name
- Patagona peruviana Boucard, 1893

Synonyms
- Patagona gigas peruviana (Boucard, 1893); Patagona boliviana Boucard, 1893; Patagona chaski Williamson et al., 2024

= Northern giant hummingbird =

Species of bird

The northern giant hummingbird (Patagona peruviana) is the largest species of hummingbird and one of two species of the genus Patagona.

== Size ==
Its mass is in the range of 17–31 g (0.60–1.09 oz), making it approximately twice as heavy as the next largest hummingbird. Its wingspan is 21.5 cm (8.5 in), with a body length of 23 cm (9.1 in). The northern giant hummingbird is slightly larger than the southern giant hummingbird, having a longer bill, wings, tail, and body length. Northern males are heavier and with longer wings than northern females.

== Range ==
The northern giant hummingbird is non-migratory and inhabits the Andes in Chile, Ecuador, and Peru, which differs from the range of the migratory southern giant hummingbird that inhabits Chile, Argentina, and Bolivia.

== Genetic analysis ==
It and the sympatric southern giant hummingbird (P. gigas) were once considered the same species, i.e., the giant hummingbird, though some researchers had already classified them as different species or subspecies in the past. Genetic analysis supports the separation of the two species which shows that they diverged between 2.1 and 3.4 million years ago, in the late Pliocene.

The binomial name, Patagona chaski, was attributed to the northern giant hummingbird in 2024, but this taxon was already described as Patagona peruviana by Adolphe Boucard in 1893, making P. chaski a junior synonym of P. peruviana.

A single F1 male hybrid between the two species has been recorded in a study that collected a sample of 101 individuals, suggesting that hybridization occurs regularly between the species. However, high genome-wide F_{ST} between the two species shows that introgression and backcrossing of first generation hybrids occurs very rarely in nature, such that there is no gene flow occurring between the two species.
