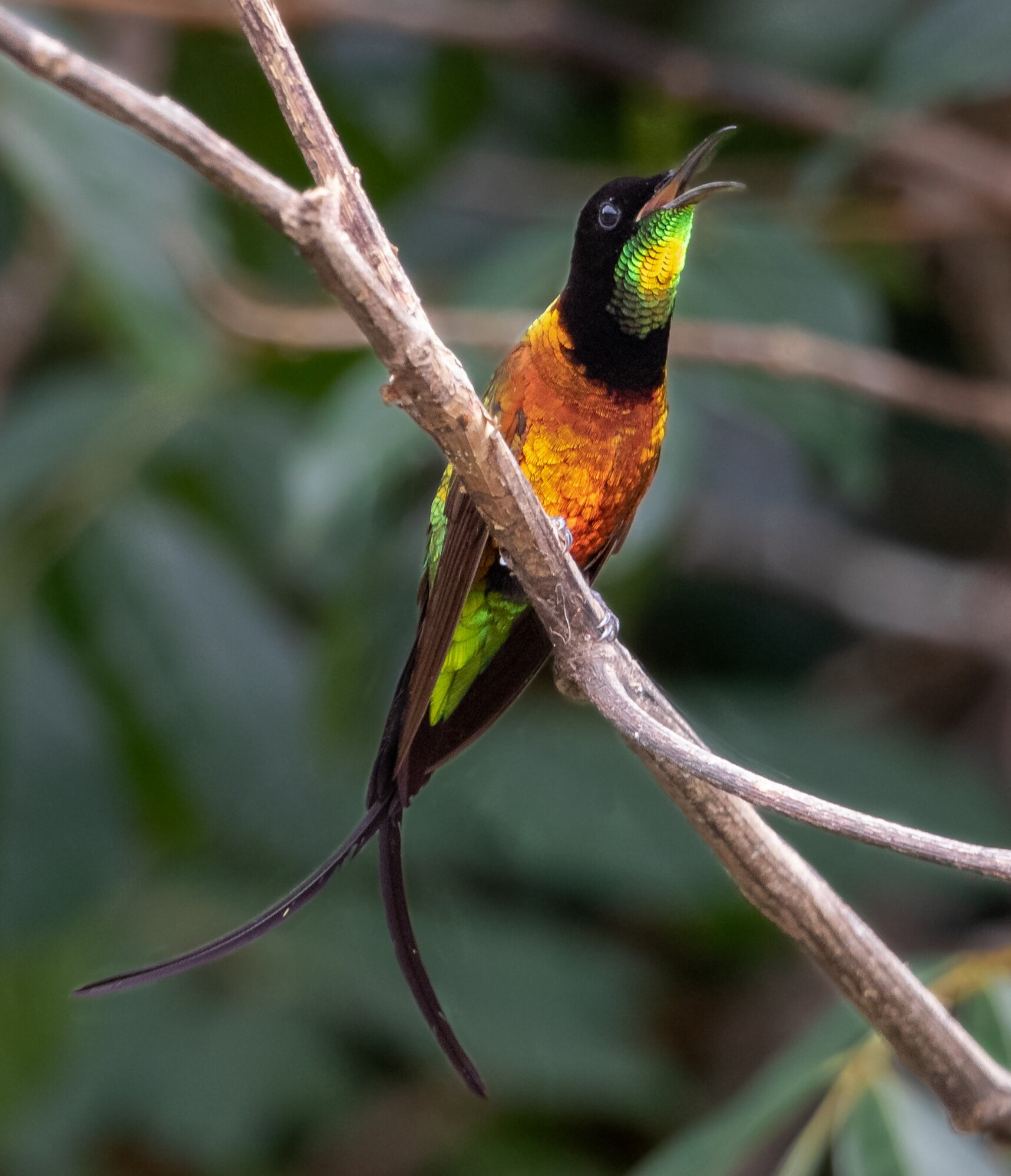
- Male in Acre, Brazil

Conservation status
- Least Concern (IUCN 3.1)
- CITES Appendix II

Scientific classification
- Kingdom: Animalia
- Phylum: Chordata
- Class: Aves
- Order: Apodiformes
- Family: Trochilidae
- Genus: Topaza
- Species: T. pyra

Binomial name
- Topaza pyra (Gould, 1846)
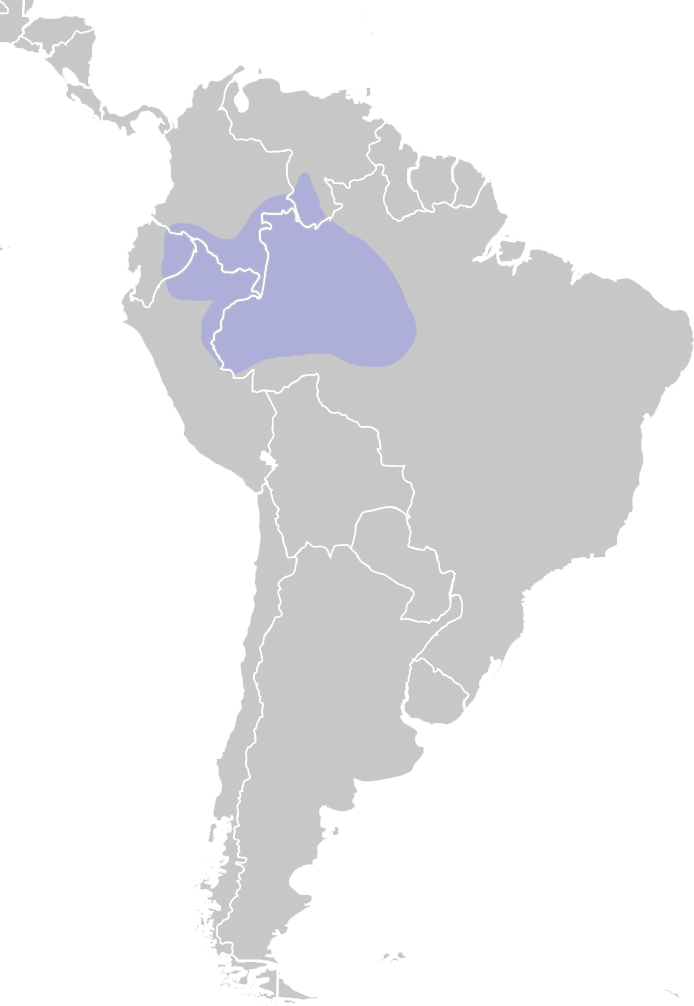

= Fiery topaz =

Species of hummingbird

The fiery topaz (Topaza pyra) is a species of hummingbird in the family Trochilidae. It has brilliant iridescent plumage and resides in northern South America, where it consumes nectar and insects.

== Taxonomy and systematics ==
The genus Topaza and its sister genus Florisuga form the topazes group, which together with the hermits represent the most ancient branch within the family Trochilidae. The Topazes group contains some of the largest hummingbirds in the family, adult males measuring up to 23 cm and weighing up to 12 g. Topazes as a group are estimated to have diverged as a separate lineage from all other hummingbirds around 21.5 Ma, whereas the most recent common ancestor of Topaza and Florisuga lived approximately 19 Ma.

Two morphospecies are recognized within Topaza: T. pyra, and the crimson topaz, T. pella. The species status of T. pyra has been challenged by some authors, who consider this genus to be monotypic. Arguments for and against the distinction between the two have focused on the degree of similarity of the two taxa and their geographic distributions. While they are clearly closely related, proponents of T. pyra being its own species point to the obvious differences between the two taxa in coloration and morphometric characteristics of both sexes, differences which are consistent across their geographic ranges. Neither intermediate forms nor hybrids have been reported, and no specimens have been found that showed any combination of the characteristics of the two taxa. The Amazon River seems to have played a part in keeping the lineages distinct, inhibiting gene flow and promoting the speciation.

Subspecies include:

- Topaza pyra pyra – it occurs from southeastern Colombia to eastern Ecuador, northeastern Peru and southern Venezuela
- Topaza pyra amaruni – it occurs in the western parts of the Amazon in Peru and Ecuador (Napo River and Río Corrientes)
- Topaza pyra pamprepta – it occurs in eastern Ecuador (Napo River and Río Suno region)

== Description ==
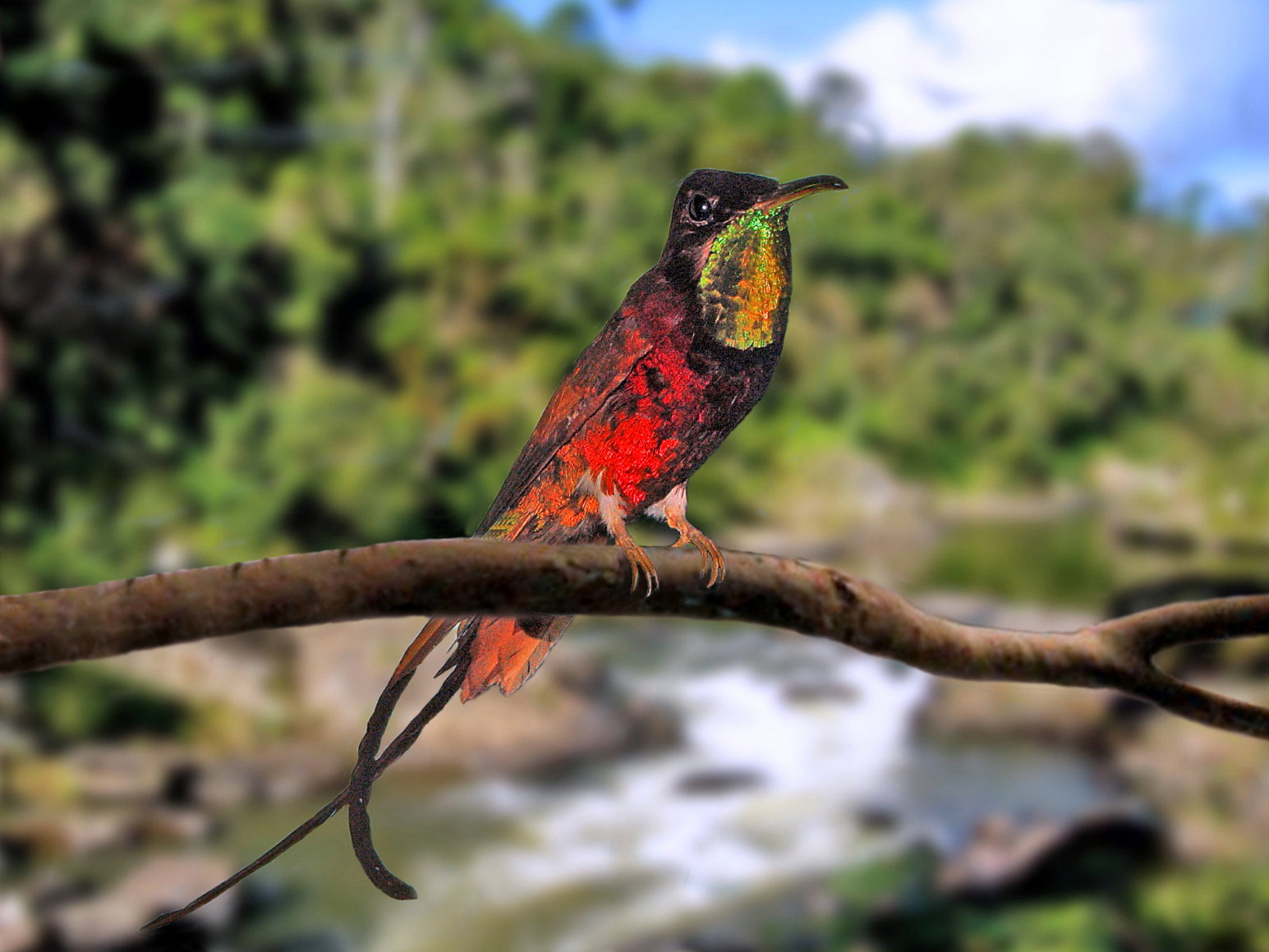
Mounted specimen

Topaza pyra can reach a body length of about 19 cm (7.5 in). There is strong sexual dimorphism between the males and females. Both have a dark brown iris, but males are larger on average than females.

Males of these brilliantly marked hummingbirds have a back, lower breast, upperwing-coverts, and outer webs of the innermost two remiges that are shining orange-red, becoming more orange on the belly, shading over the rump into the yellow-green/green uppertail-coverts. The top and sides of the head are velvet black, with an iridescent green and orange red throat and a thick, decurved and a rather short bill (about 25 mm (0.98 in). They have two characteristic elongated central tails (about 64 mm (2.5 in). The male's bill is black, and it has gray feet.

Females are shining green above, with a coppery red gorget bordered by a narrow orange-yellow-green band. The rest of the head is medium to bluish-green, with the breast less bluish. Tail is purplish red. Female bills are black like the male's, but their feet are orange/flesh colored. The upper and under-tail coverts have orange highlights in the males, as opposed to blue-green in the females, and are somewhat lengthened and loose-webbed.

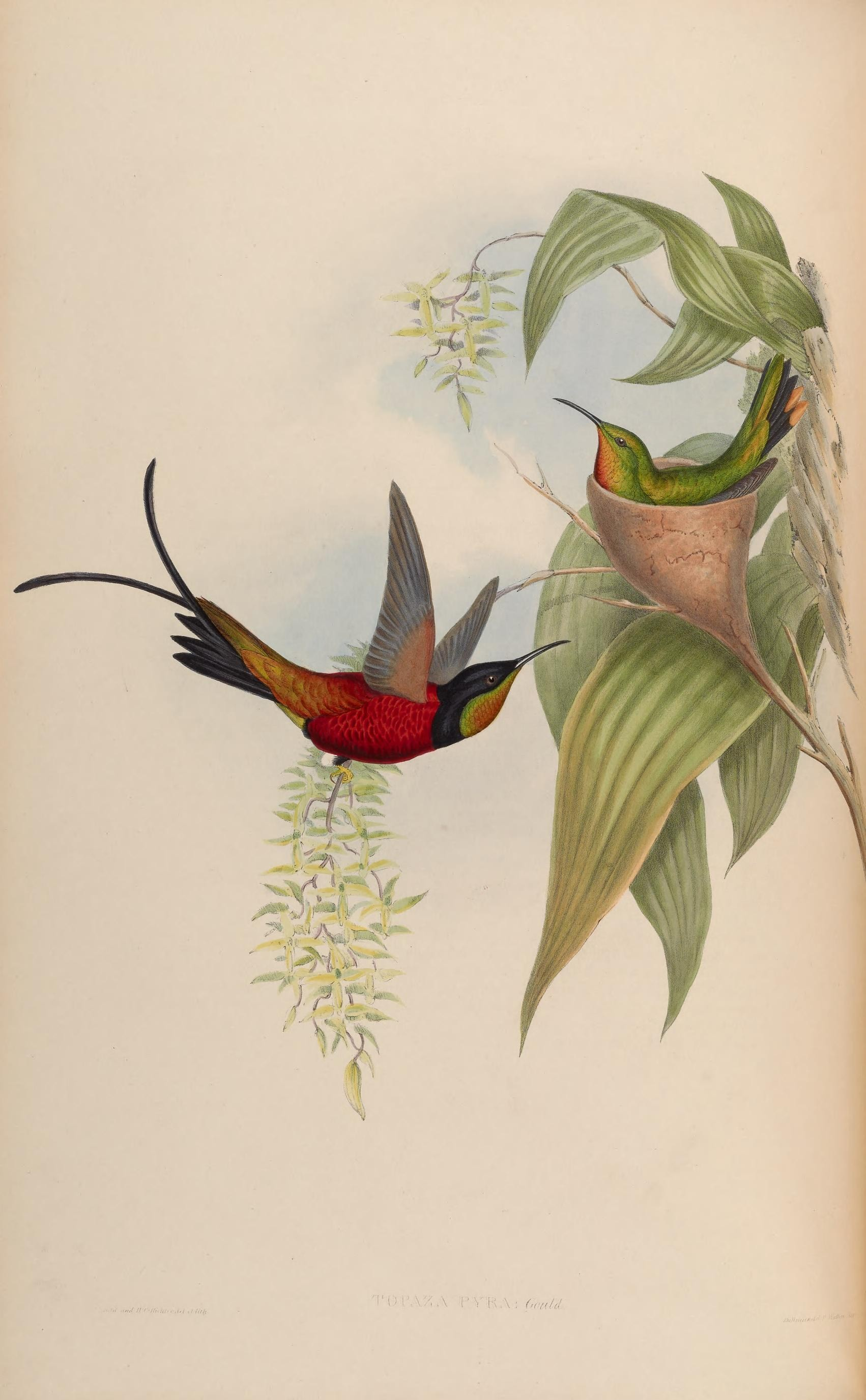
Illustration of a male and female from John Gould's A monograph of the Trochilidae, or family of humming-birds, Volume 2, 1861.

This species is very similar to crimson topaz. Topaza pyra can be distinguished from the closely related Topaza pella by their shorter beaks, longer wings, longer tail, and thinner rectrices.

== Distribution and habitat ==
Topaz hummingbirds as a group are endemic to the Amazonian rainforest. This species has a very large range. T. pyra can be found in Brazil, Colombia, Ecuador, Peru and Venezuela. Its natural habitat is subtropical or tropical moist lowland forest, at an elevation up to 500 metres (1,600 ft) above sea level. They are encountered high in the canopy and prefer the edges of forests and clearings near water, and are often seen close to river banks.

== Behavior and ecology ==
Little is known about the behavior of these birds, as there have been few observations made of them in the wild, but they have been observed feeding and interacting with one another over a rocky streams in the foothills of their territory. They are also known to nest in small lichen-covered cups low over the water, like other hummingbirds. The males are rather territorial, and usually ward off intruders around flowering areas.

Song of Fiery Topaz

== Food and feeding ==
As with their behavior, more observational studies of these birds is needed. However, it is known that this species is mainly nectarivorous, and feeds at flowers, vines, and epiphytes from eye level to high in the canopy, preferring high flowering vines. They also feed on insects.

== Status ==
Topaza pyra is categorized as Least Concern, due to its broad range, but with a decreasing population. Population is unknown, but estimated to be greater than the threshold for Vulnerable classifications, and the rate of population decline is not thought to be rapid enough to classify as Vulnerable.
