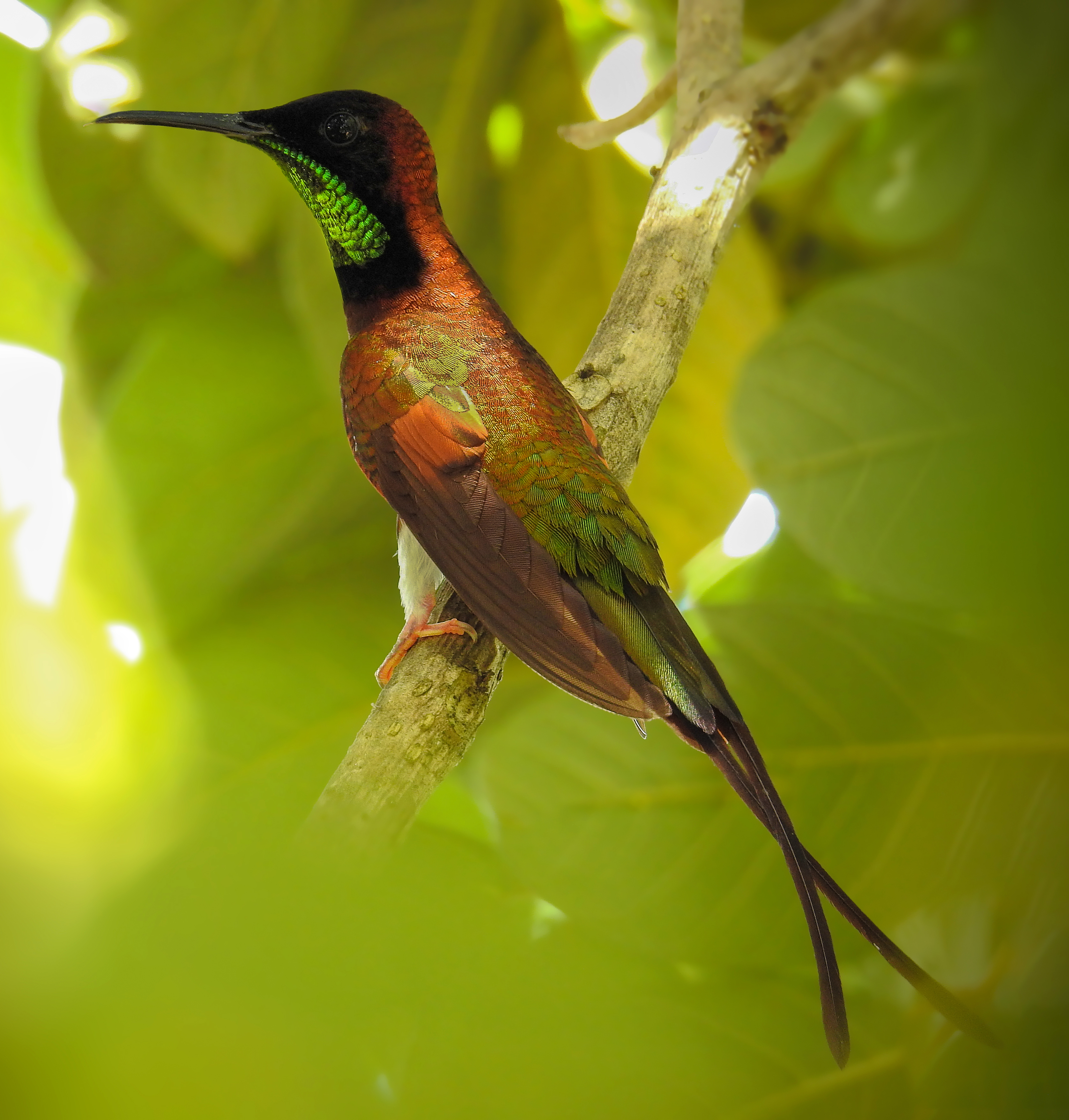
- Crimson topaz (Topaza pella)

Scientific classification
- Kingdom: Animalia
- Phylum: Chordata
- Class: Aves
- Clade: Strisores
- Order: Apodiformes
- Family: Trochilidae
- Subfamily: Florisuginae
- Genus: Topaza; G.R. Gray, 1840

Type species
- Trochilus pella Linnaeus, 1758

Species
- 2, see text

= Topaz (hummingbird) =

Genus of birds

The topazes are two species of hummingbirds in the genus Topaza. They are found in humid forests in the Amazon Basin. Males are by far the largest hummingbirds in their range – the giant hummingbird of the Andes is the only larger species in the family. Males have a total length of about 22 cm (8 3/4 in), although this includes their elongated rectrices. They are colourful, being mainly strongly iridescent golden and crimson with a black hood and a green throat. Females lack the elongated rectrices and have a mainly green plumage.

== Taxonomy ==
The genus Topaz was introduced by the English zoologist George Robert Gray in 1840 with the crimson topaz as the type species. The genus contains two species, the crimson topaz and the fiery topaz. Although generally considered to be distinct species, they have in the past been thought to be conspecific by some authors.

Genus Topaza – Linnaeus, 1758 – two species
Common name	Scientific name and subspecies	Range	Size and ecology	IUCN status and estimated population
Crimson topaz	Topaza pella (Linnaeus, 1758) Three subspecies: T. p. pella (Linnaeus, 1758); T. p. smaragdulus (Bosc, 1792); T. p. microrhyncha Butler, AL, 1926	Brazil, Colombia, French Guiana, Guyana, Peru, Suriname, and Venezuela.	Size: Habitat: Diet:	LC
Fiery topaz	Topaza pyra (Gould, 1846) Three subspecies: Topaza pyra pyra – it occurs from southeastern Colombia to eastern Ecuador, northeastern Peru and southern Venezuela; Topaza pyra amaruni – it occurs in the western parts of the Amazon in Peru and Ecuador (Napo River and Río Corrientes); Topaza pyra pamprepta – it occurs in eastern Ecuador (Napo River and Río Suno region)	Brazil, Colombia, Ecuador, Peru, and Venezuela.	Size: Habitat: Diet:	LC
