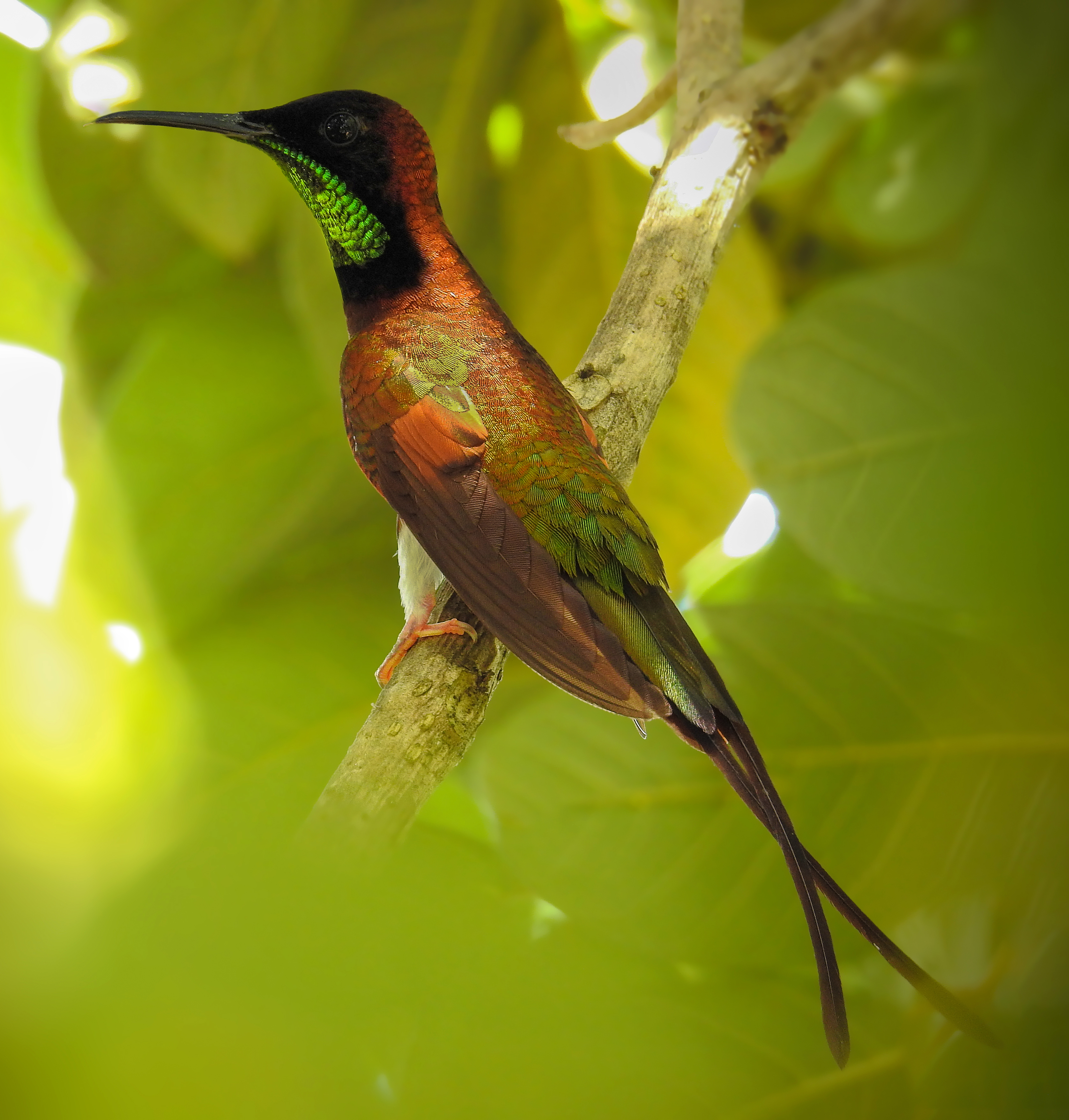

Conservation status
- Least Concern (IUCN 3.1)
- CITES Appendix II

Scientific classification
- Kingdom: Animalia
- Phylum: Chordata
- Class: Aves
- Order: Apodiformes
- Family: Trochilidae
- Genus: Topaza
- Species: T. pella

Binomial name
- Topaza pella (Linnaeus, 1758)
- Distribution of Topaza pella

Synonyms
- Trochilus pella Linnaeus, 1758

= Crimson topaz =

Species of hummingbird

The crimson topaz (Topaza pella) is a species of hummingbird in the family Trochilidae. It is found in Brazil, French Guiana, Guyana, Suriname, and Venezuela.

== Taxonomy and systematics ==
The crimson topaz was formally described by the Swedish naturalist Carl Linnaeus in 1758 in the tenth edition of his Systema Naturae under the binomial name Trochilus pella. Linnaeus based his description on the "Long-tail'd red huming-bird" that had been described and illustrated by the English naturalist George Edwards in 1743 from a specimen owned by Charles Lennox, the Duke of Richmond. The specimen had been collected in Suriname. The specific epithet is from the Latin pellus meaning "dark-colored". The crimson topaz is now placed in the genus Topaza that was introduced by George Robert Gray in 1840 with the crimson topaz as the type species.

Three subspecies are recognised:

- T. p. pella Linnaeus (1758)
- T. p. smaragdulus Bosc (1792)
- T. p. microrhyncha Butler, AL (1926)

The crimson topaz has been treated as conspecific with the fiery topaz (T. pyra) but currently (2021) the two are considered to form a superspecies.

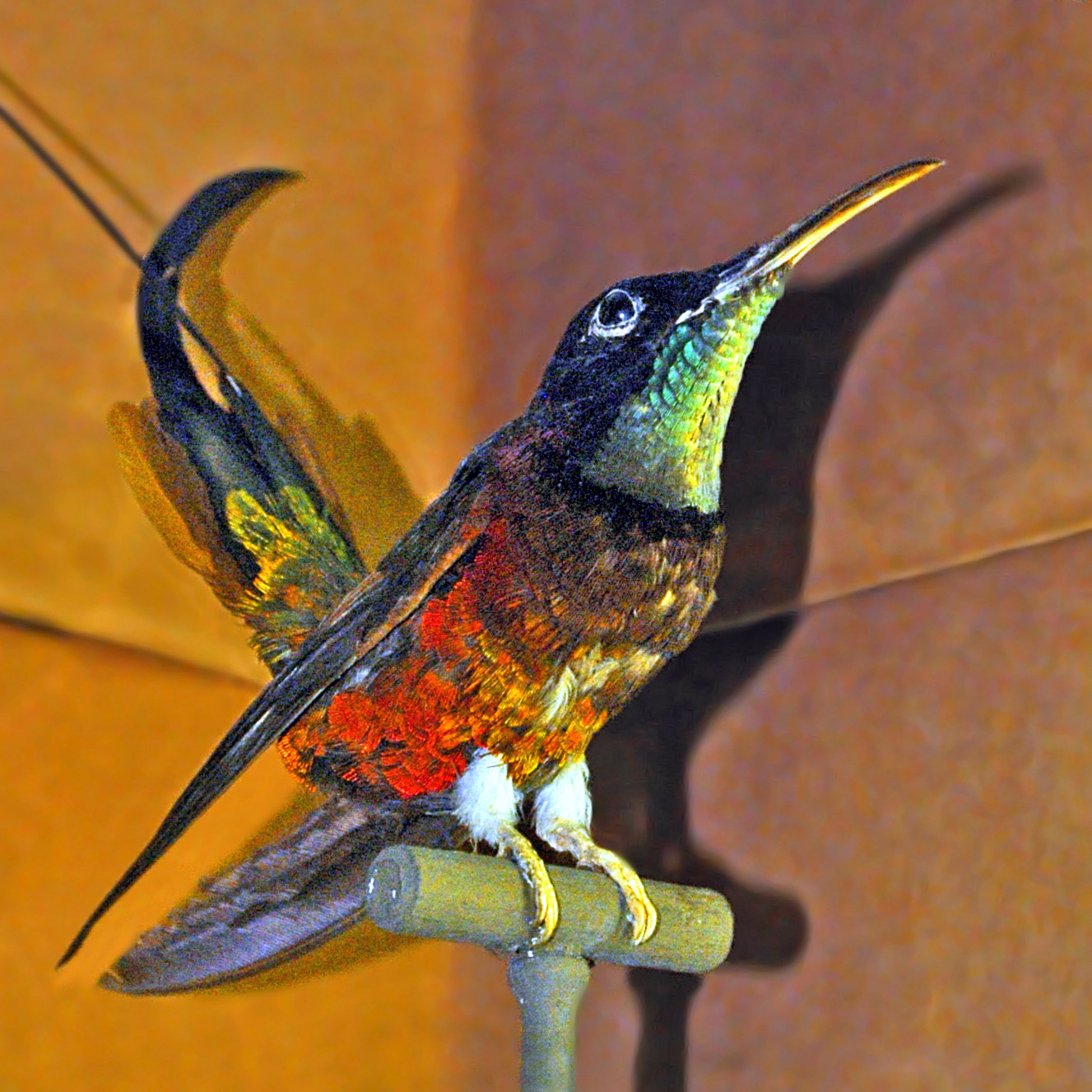
Museum specimen

== Description ==
The male crimson topaz is 21 to 23 cm (8.3 to 9.1 in) long including the 5 cm (2.0 in) bill and 8.6 to 12 cm (3.4 to 4.7 in) tail, and weighs 11 to 18 g (0.39 to 0.63 oz). Females are 13 to 14 cm (5.1 to 5.5 in) long and weigh 9 to 12.5 g (0.32 to 0.44 oz). It may be the second largest species of hummingbird after the giant hummingbird, rivaled only by its cousin, the fiery topaz.

Male and female crimson topaz have different plumages. Both have a straight to slightly decurved bill. The male's head, face, and the sides of the neck are velvety black. Its back is iridescent crimson to gold on the uppertail coverts. The central tail feathers are bronzy green and the outer ones chestnut; two of the latter are elongated and crossed. The throat is golden green surrounded by a black band and the underparts bright red. The wings are brown. The female's head and back are dark green and its underparts a lighter green with golden green inclusions; the throat is green with crimson inclusions. The central tail feathers are bronzy, the middle pair violet, and the outer pair chestnut, and none are elongated like the male's.

== Distribution and habitat ==
The subspecies of crimson topaz are distributed thus:

- T. p. pella, eastern Venezuela through Guyana and Suriname into northern and western Brazil as far south as Rondônia
- T. p. smaragdulus, French Guiana and northeastern Brazil to between the Tapajós and Tocantins Rivers
- T. p. microrhyncha, Brazil's northeastern Pará state east of the Tocantins and Marajó Island at the mouth of the Amazon

The species mainly inhabits inland rainforest in lowlands and foothills at elevations up to 500 m (1,600 ft). It frequents granite outcrops and also gallery forest along small waterways.

== Behavior ==
=== Movement ===
The crimson topaz is mostly sedentary during the breeding season but at other times appears to roam elsewhere seeking flowering plants.

=== Feeding ===
Male crimson topaz defend feeding territories. The species feeds on nectar of flowering trees, mainly in the canopy of the forest, and also the flowers of vines and epiphytes. It has been observed feeding in flowering shrubs near the ground in Suriname. It also captures small insects in the air, both above the canopy and low along streams.

=== Breeding ===
The crimson topaz's breeding season varies across its range; it has two seasons in the Guianas. Males make display flights that show the white feathers on their legs. The female builds a cup nest of Ceiba seed fibers and spider web, often on vertical branches or in vines, and often over water. The clutch size is two eggs.

=== Vocalization ===
The crimson topaz's song is an "irregular series of chattering 'chip' notes given almost continually (other than breaks to feed) throughout the day." It often sings from a perch in the canopy and may make short flights out and back to the same perch between songs.

== Status ==
The IUCN has assessed the crimson topaz as being of Least Concern, though its population has not been enumerated and is believed to be decreasing. It is considered rare to locally common, but may be undercounted because of its treetop habits. It occurs in several protected areas and continues to be discovered in "gaps" in its range.

== Additional reading ==
- Arthur Lennox Butler: Mr. A. L. Butler exhibited some examples of Topaza pella which he had recently received from the neighbourhood of Pará. In: Bulletin of the British Ornithologists' Club. Bd. 46, 1926, S. 56–57 (online, retrieved 19 June 2014).
- Da-Shih Hu, Leo Joseph, David Agro: Distribution, Variation, and Taxonomy of Topaza Hummingbirds (Aves: Trochilidae). In: Ornitologia Neotropical. Bd. 11, Nr. 2, 2000, S. 123–142
- Harry Church Oberholser: Catalogue of a collection of hummingbirds from Ecuador and Colombia. In: Proceedings of the United States National Museum. Bd. 24, 1902, S. 309–342
- Louis Augustin Guillaume Bosc: Description d'une nouvelle espèce de Grimpereau. In: Journal d'histoire naturelle. Bd. 1, 1792, S. 385–386, Tafel 20, Abbildung 5
