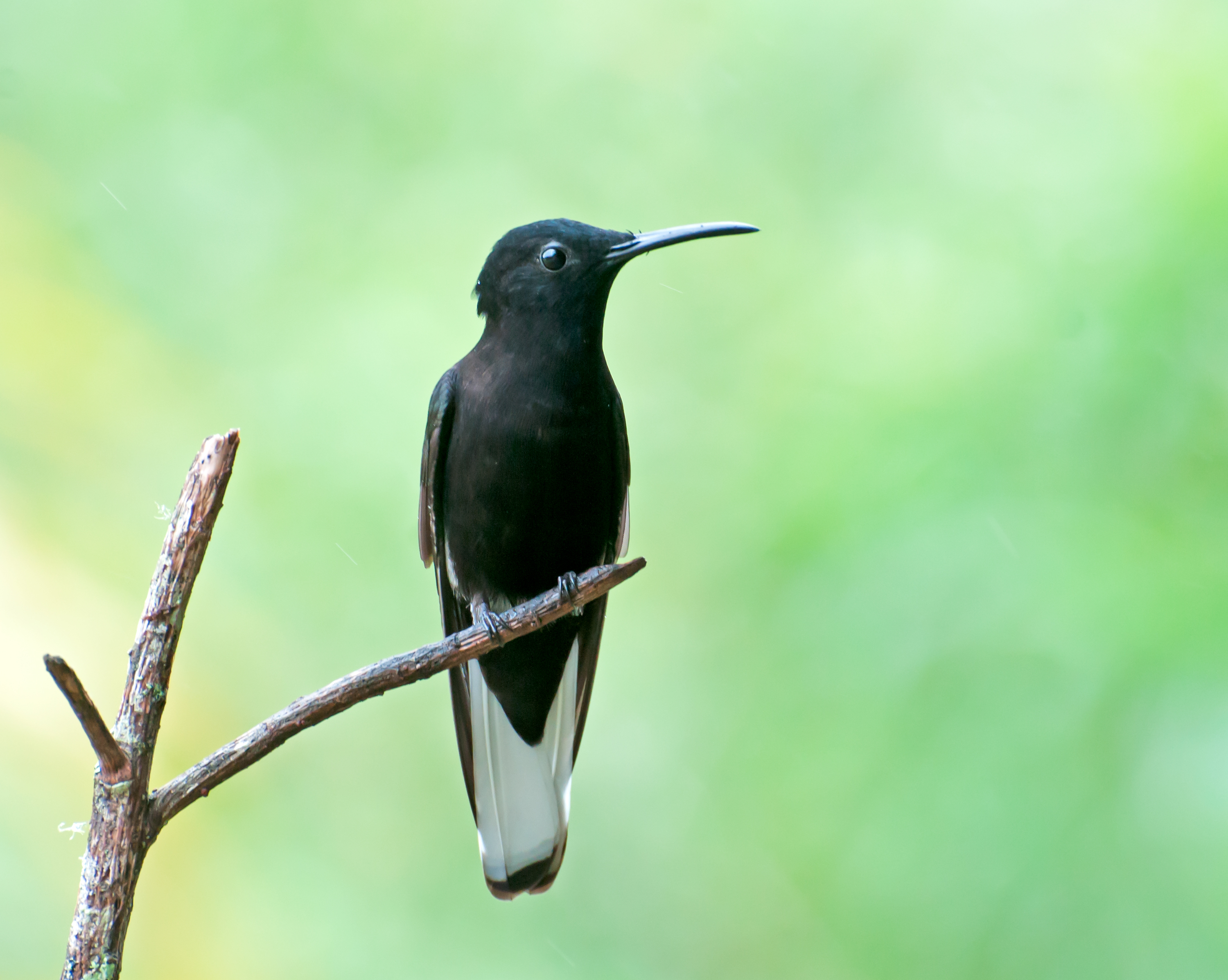
- Adult in Reserva Guainumbi, São Luis do Paraitinga, São Paulo, Brazil

Conservation status
- Least Concern (IUCN 3.1)
- CITES Appendix II

Scientific classification
- Kingdom: Animalia
- Phylum: Chordata
- Class: Aves
- Order: Apodiformes
- Family: Trochilidae
- Genus: Florisuga
- Species: F. fusca

Binomial name
- Florisuga fusca (Vieillot, 1817)

Synonyms
- Melanotrochilus fuscus (Vieillot, 1817)

= Black jacobin =

Species of hummingbird

The black jacobin (Florisuga fusca) is a species of hummingbird in the family Trochilidae. It is found in Argentina, Brazil, Paraguay, and Uruguay.

== Taxonomy and systematics ==
The black jacobin was traditionally placed in the monotypic genus Melanotrochilus, but voice, anatomy, and reproductive behavior place it in Florisuga with the white-necked jacobin. The species is monotypic.

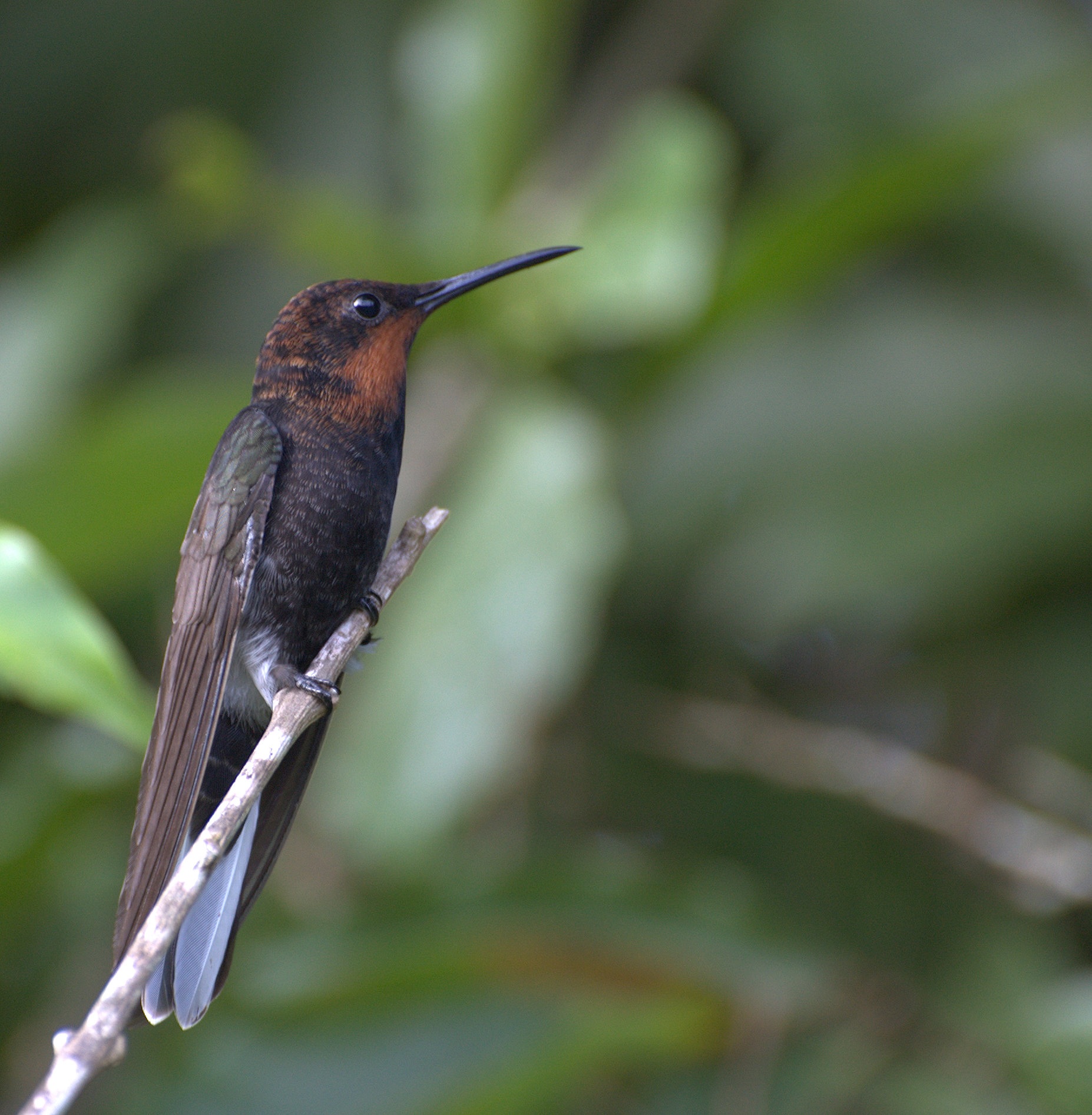
Immature

== Description ==
The black jacobin is 12 to 13 cm (4.7 to 5.1 in) long. Males weigh about 9 g (0.32 oz) and females 8 g (0.28 oz). Adults of both sexes are mostly black, with a bronzy-olive lower back and uppertail- and wing-coverts. The flanks are white, the inner rectrices black, and the outer rectrices white with black tips. Juveniles are dark except for a wide cinnamon band on the center and sides of the throat and a white belly and outer rectrices.

== Distribution and habitat ==
The black jacobin is found in southeastern Brazil, approximately from Bahia south through Rio Grande do Sul and into eastern Uruguay, and separately in southeastern Paraguay, northeastern Argentina, and adjoining Brazil. There are also scattered records from sites outside its primary range. It mostly inhabits woodlands, gardens, and coffee and cacao plantations with tall trees. In elevation it ranges from sea level to 1,400 m (4,590 ft).

== Behavior ==
=== Movement ===
The black jacobin is migratory, but the pattern is not well understood. The trend is for southward movement for the austral winter, though there are also winter records to the northwest in the cerrado biome of south-central Brazil.

=== Feeding ===
The black jacobin forages at all levels of its habitat. It feeds on nectar at the flowers of many native and introduced trees and shrubs and from bromeliads as well. The species is highly territorial and defends food sources against conspecifics and other species. However, "congregations" of 50 or more have been documented in July feeding on patches of Dombeya wallichii, an introduced shrub. In addition to nectar, the black jacobin takes small insects on the wing and from leaves and spider webs.

=== Breeding ===
The black jacobin breeds between July and May, and two broods per year are common. Its nest is a cup made of fine plant fibers and cobweb, placed on the mid-rib of a large horizontal leaf, typically between 1 and 4 m (3.3 and 13 ft) up in a tree or shrub. The clutch size is two eggs. Females use a display flight to distract predators.

=== Vocalization ===
The black jacobin's song is "a series of high-pitched hissing notes above 10 kHz, 'szee..szee....szee..szee..szee....szee...'." Its calls include "a short 'tsik' or 'chik', and a short trill 'tr-r-r'."

== Status ==
The IUCN has assessed the black jacobin as being of Least Concern, though its population has not been quantified and its trend is not known. It is common in Brazil and occurs in many protected areas. "Ready occupation of man-made habitats suggests that habitat loss is unlikely to be a problem."
