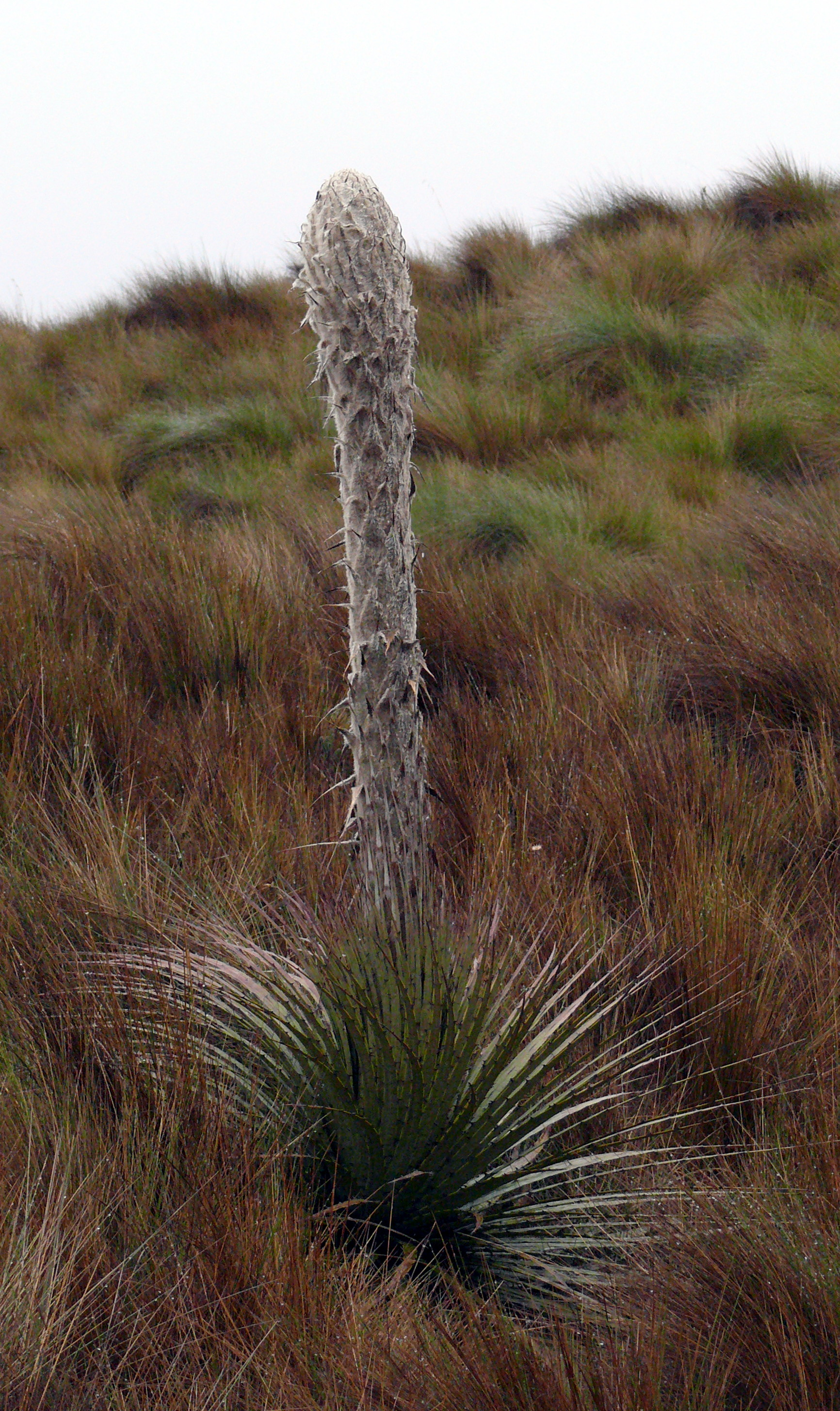

Conservation status
- Least Concern (IUCN 3.1)

Scientific classification
- Kingdom: Plantae
- Clade: Tracheophytes
- Clade: Angiosperms
- Clade: Monocots
- Clade: Commelinids
- Order: Poales
- Family: Bromeliaceae
- Genus: Puya
- Subgenus: Puya subg. Puyopsis
- Species: P. clava-herculis

Binomial name
- Puya clava-herculis Mez & Sodiro

= Puya clava-herculis =

Species of flowering plant

Puya clava-herculis is a species of flowering plant in the family Bromeliaceae. This species is native to Ecuador. It is sometimes referred to by the common names Chupalla or Cardón.
