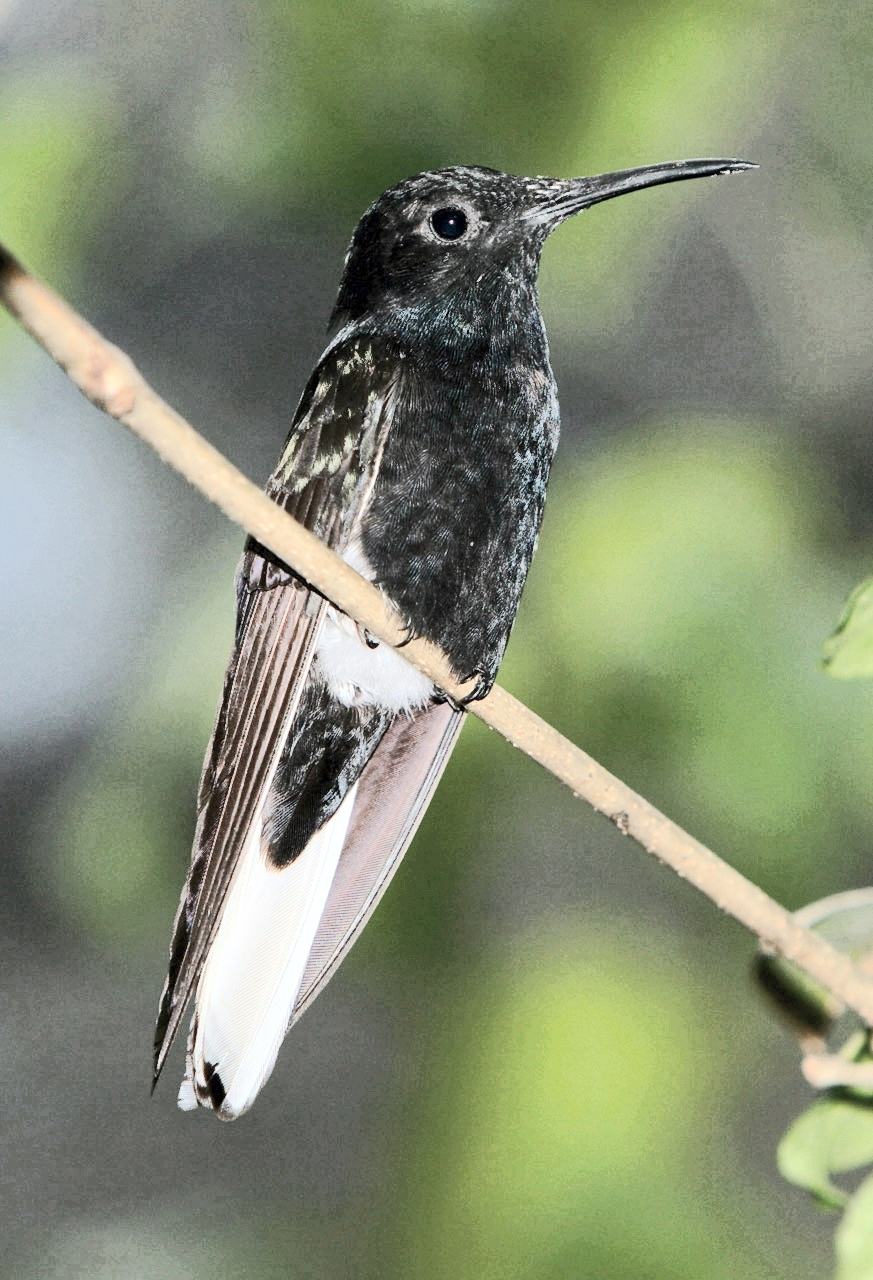
- Black jacobin, (Florisuga fusca)

Scientific classification
- Domain: Eukaryota
- Kingdom: Animalia
- Phylum: Chordata
- Class: Aves
- Clade: Strisores
- Order: Apodiformes
- Family: Trochilidae
- Subfamily: Florisuginae
- Genus: Florisuga; Bonaparte, 1850

Type species
- Trochilus mellivorus Linnaeus, 1758

Species
- 2, see text

= Jacobin (hummingbird) =

Genus of birds

The jacobins are two species of hummingbirds in the genus Florisuga.

== Taxonomy ==
The genus Florisuga was introduced in 1850 by the French naturalist Charles Lucien Bonaparte. The name combines the Latin flos, floris meaning "flower" with sugere meaning "to suck". The type species is the white-necked jacobin.

The genus contains the following species:

Genus Florisuga – Linnaeus, 1758 – two species
Common name	Scientific name and subspecies	Range	Size and ecology	IUCN status and estimated population
White-necked jacobin Male Female	Florisuga mellivora (Linnaeus, 1758) Two subspecies: F. m. mellivora Linnaeus (1758); F. m. flabellifera Gould (1846)	Brazil, Colombia, French Guiana, Guyana, Peru, Suriname, and Venezuela.	Size: Habitat: Diet:	LC
Black jacobin	Florisuga fusca (Vieillot, 1817)	eastern Brazil, Uruguay, eastern Paraguay, and far north-eastern Argentina	Size: Habitat: Diet:	LC
