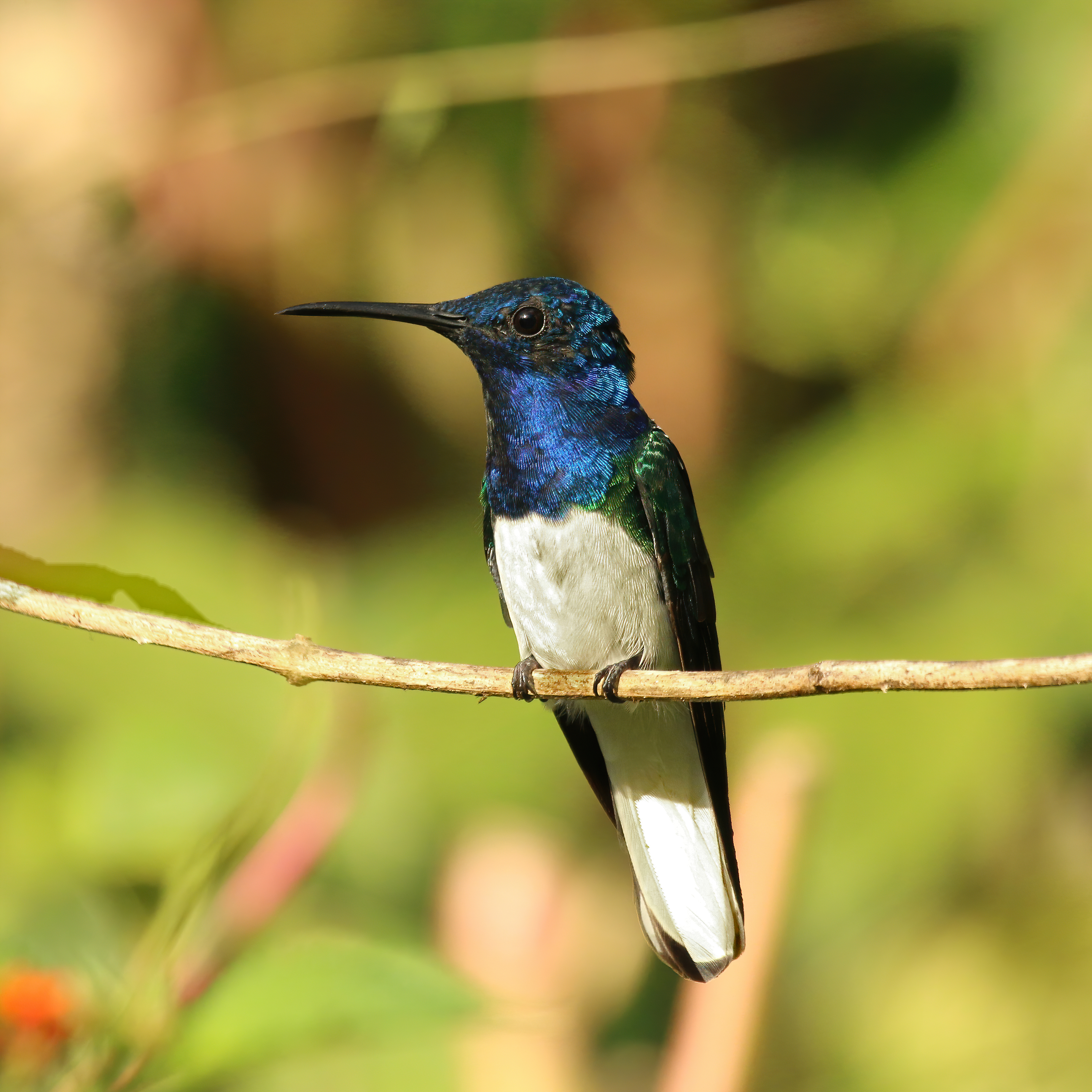
- Male F. m. mellivora, Trinidad
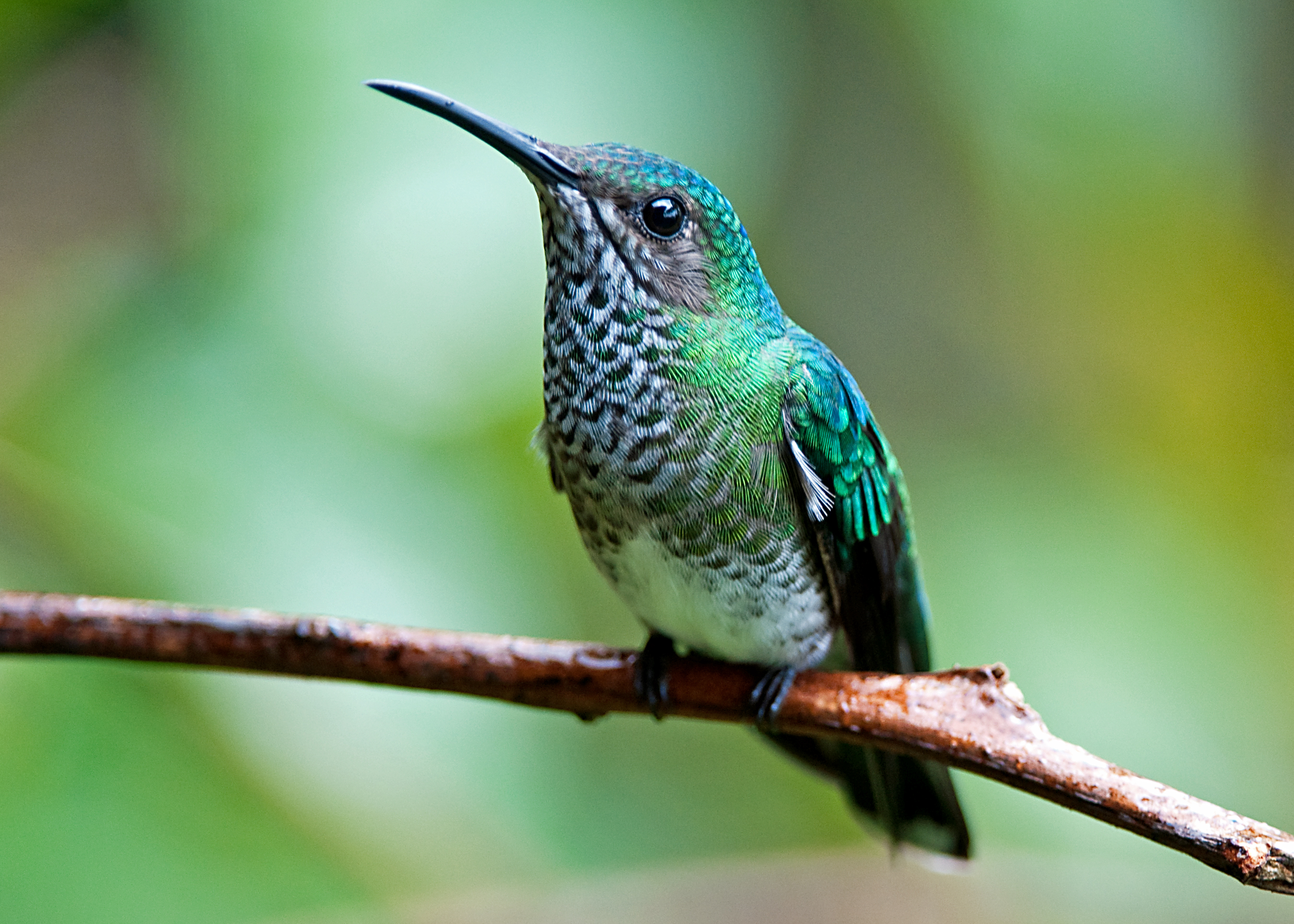
- Female, Costa Rica

Conservation status
- Least Concern (IUCN 3.1)
- CITES Appendix II

Scientific classification
- Kingdom: Animalia
- Phylum: Chordata
- Class: Aves
- Order: Apodiformes
- Family: Trochilidae
- Genus: Florisuga
- Species: F. mellivora

Binomial name
- Florisuga mellivora (Linnaeus, 1758)

Synonyms
- Trochilus mellivorus Linnaeus, 1758

= White-necked jacobin =

Species of hummingbird

The white-necked jacobin (Florisuga mellivora) is a medium-sized hummingbird that ranges from Mexico south through Central America and northern South America into Brazil, Peru, and Bolivia. It is also found in Trinidad and Tobago. Its other common names include great jacobin and collared hummingbird.

== Taxonomy ==
In 1743, English naturalist George Edwards included a picture and a description of the white-necked jacobin in his A Natural History of Uncommon Birds. He used the English name "white-belly'd huming bird". Edwards based his etching on a specimen owned by the Duke of Richmond that had been collected in Suriname. When in 1758, Swedish naturalist Carl Linnaeus updated his Systema Naturae for the 10th edition, he placed the white-necked jacobin with the other hummingbirds in the genus Trochilus. Linnaeus included a brief description, coined the binomial name Trochilus mellivorus, and cited Edwards' work. The specific epithet combines the Latin mel and -vorus, meaning "honey eating". The type locality is Suriname. The white-necked jacobin is now placed in the genus Florisuga that was introduced in 1850 by Charles Bonaparte.

=== Subspecies ===
Two subspecies are recognised:

Subspecies	Male	Female
F. m. mellivora Linnaeus (1758)		
F. m. flabellifera Gould (1846)*		

*Sometimes referred to as F. m. tobagensis

== Description ==
The white-necked jacobin is 11 to 12 cm (4.3 to 4.7 in) long. Males weigh 7.4 to 9.0 g (0.26 to 0.32 oz) and females 6.0 to 9.2 g (0.21 to 0.32 oz). The male is unmistakable with its dark blue head and chest and white belly and tail; the tail feathers have black tips. A white band on the nape separates the blue head from the bright green back and long uppertail coverts. Females are highly variable, and may resemble adult or immature males. Most females have green upperparts, a blue-green throat and breast with white "scales", a white belly, and a mostly green tail with a blue end. Immature males vary from female-like, but with more white in the tail, to male-like with more black there. Immature females also vary, but usually have less white in the tail and are somewhat bronzy on the throat and chest.

== Distribution and habitat ==
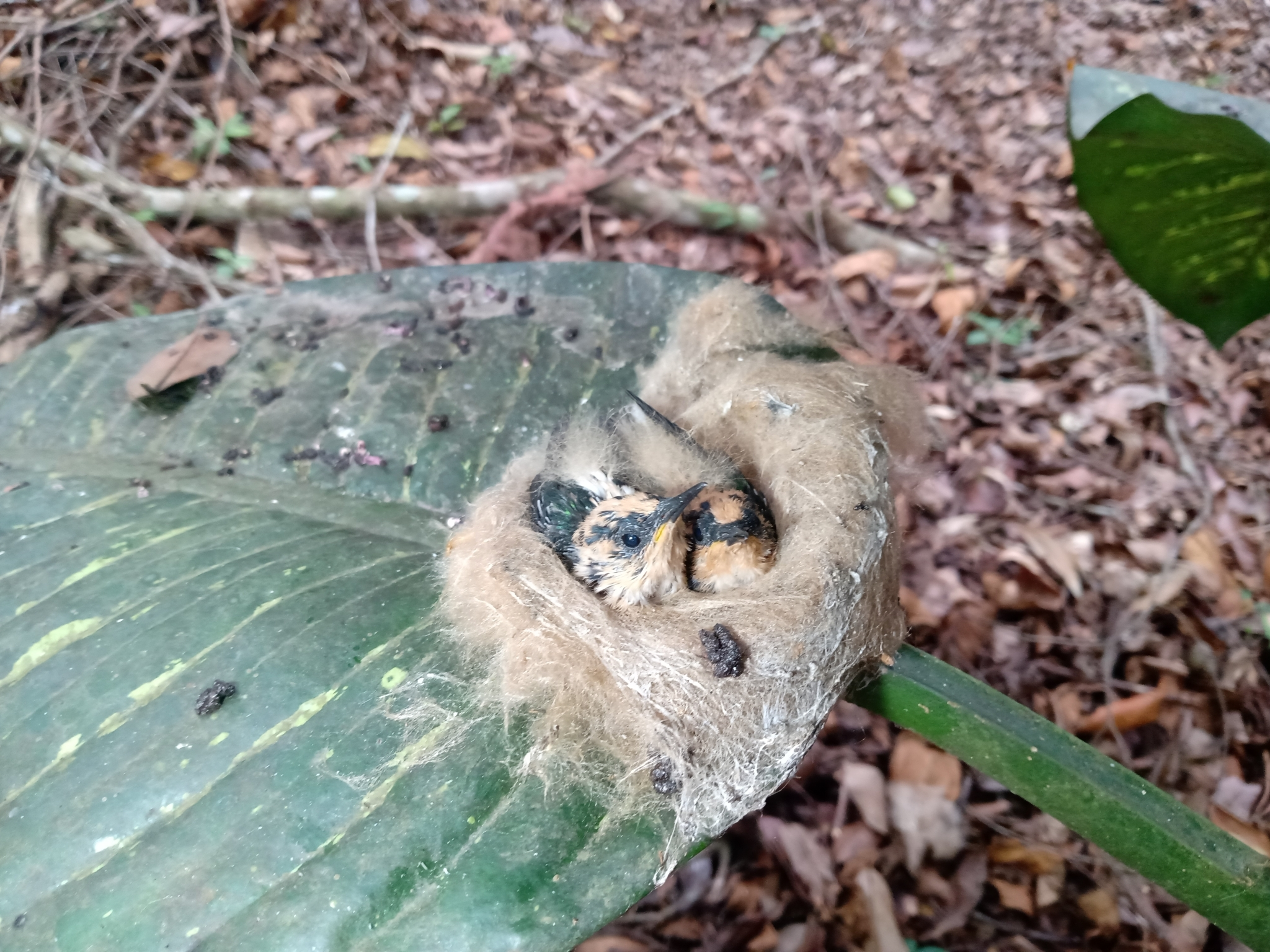
Nest, in Colombia

The nominate subspecies of white-necked jacobin, F. m. mellivora, is found from southern Veracruz and northern Oaxaca, Mexico, through southern Belize, northern Guatemala, eastern Honduras and Nicaragua, eastern and western Costa Rica, and Panama into South America. In that continent, it is found in much of Colombia and Ecuador, eastern Peru, northern Bolivia, most of Venezuela, the Guianas, the northwestern half of Brazil, and the island of Trinidad. F. m. flabellifera is found only on the island of Tobago. The nominate has been recorded as a vagrant in Argentina, on the islands of Aruba and Curaçao, and on Isla Contoy off the coast of the Yucatan Peninsula.

The white-necked jacobin inhabits the canopy and edges of humid forest and also semiopen landscapes such as tall secondary forest, gallery forest, and coffee and cacao plantations. It is usually seen high in trees, but comes lower at edges and in clearings. In elevation, it usually ranges from sea level to about 900 m (2,950 ft), but rarely has also been seen as high as 1,500 m (4,920 ft).

== Behavior ==
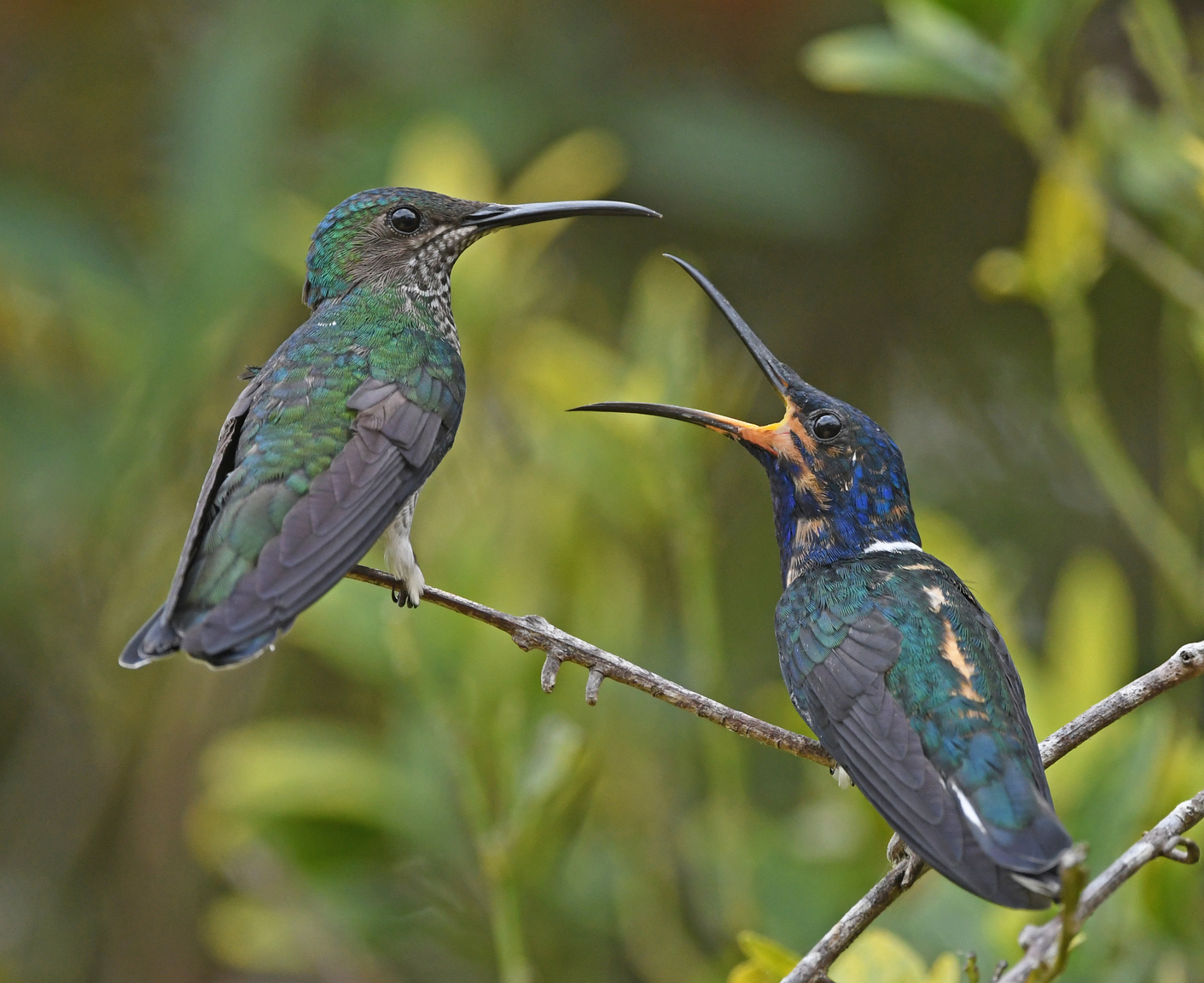
Immature male begging for food from its mother

The white-necked jacobin's movement pattern is not well understood. It apparently moves seasonally as flower abundance changes, but details are lacking.

It feeds on nectar at the flowers of tall trees, epiphytes, shrubs, and Heliconia plants. Several may feed in one tree and are aggressive to each other, but they are otherwise seldom territorial. Both sexes hawk small insects, mostly by hovering, darting, or sallying from perches.

This species breeds in the dry to early wet seasons, which vary across their range. The nest is a shallow cup of plant down and cobweb placed on the upper surface of a leaf where another leaf provides a "roof". It is typically 1 to 3 m (3 to 10 ft) above ground and sometimes near a stream. Males display and chase in the canopy and along edges during the breeding season. Females use a fluttering flight to distract predators.

The white-necked jacobin is not highly vocal. Its song is "a long series of high-pitched, single notes, repeated at rate around 0.7–1.0 notes/second 'tseee....tseee....tseee....tseee....'." Calls include "a short 'tsik', a longer, high-pitched 'sweet', and a descending 'swee-swee-swee-swee' in antagonistic interactions."

== Status ==
The IUCN has assessed the white-necked jacobin as being of least concern. It has an extremely large range, but its population has not been quantified, and its trend is unknown. It is deemed uncommon to common in most of its range. It occurs in many protected areas and appears able to use human-altered landscapes such as tree plantations.

== Gallery ==
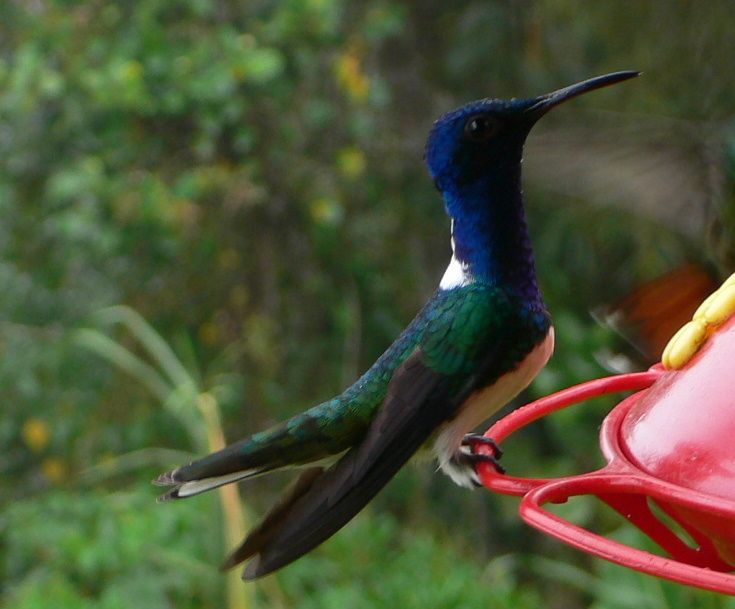
Male

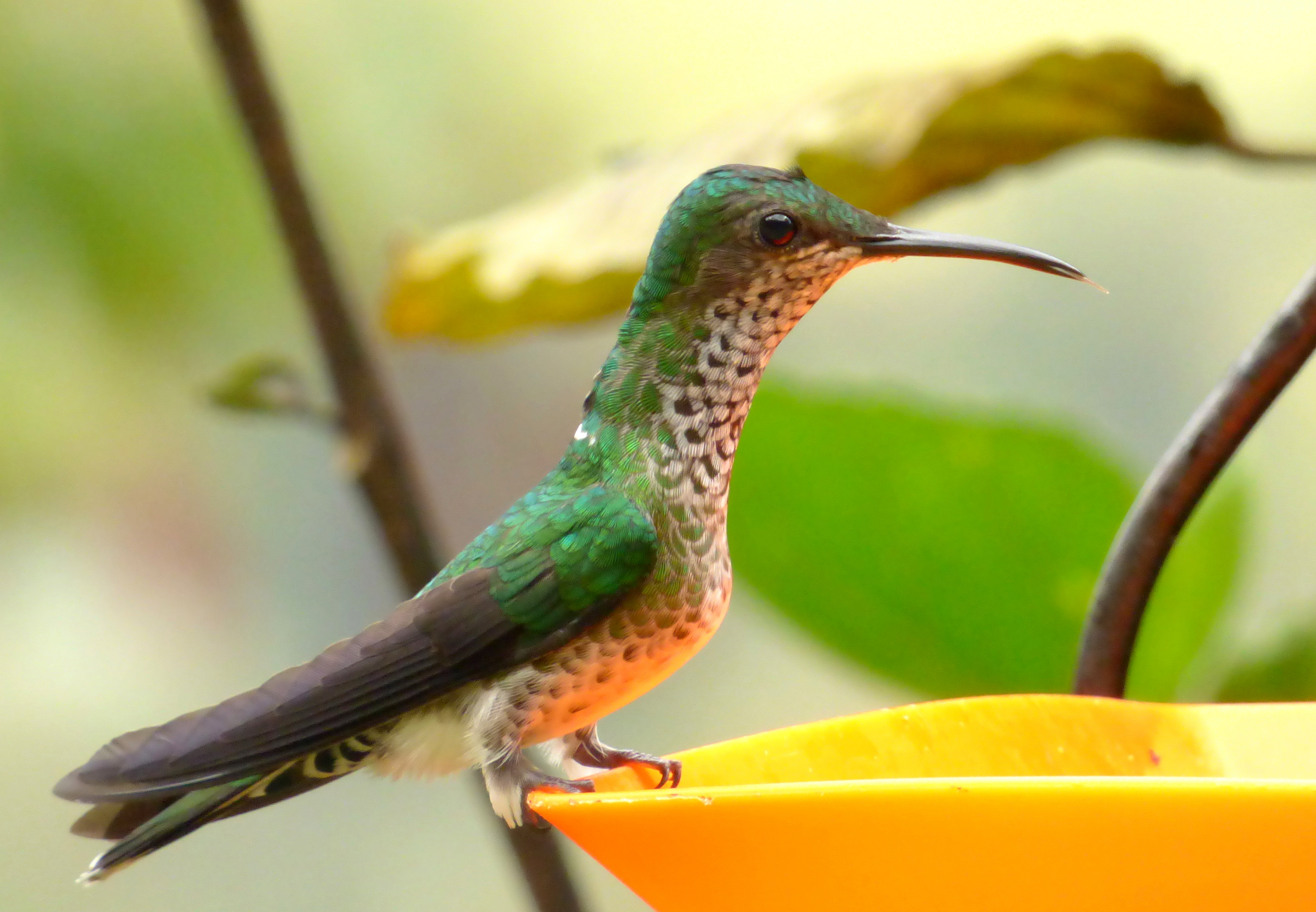
Female

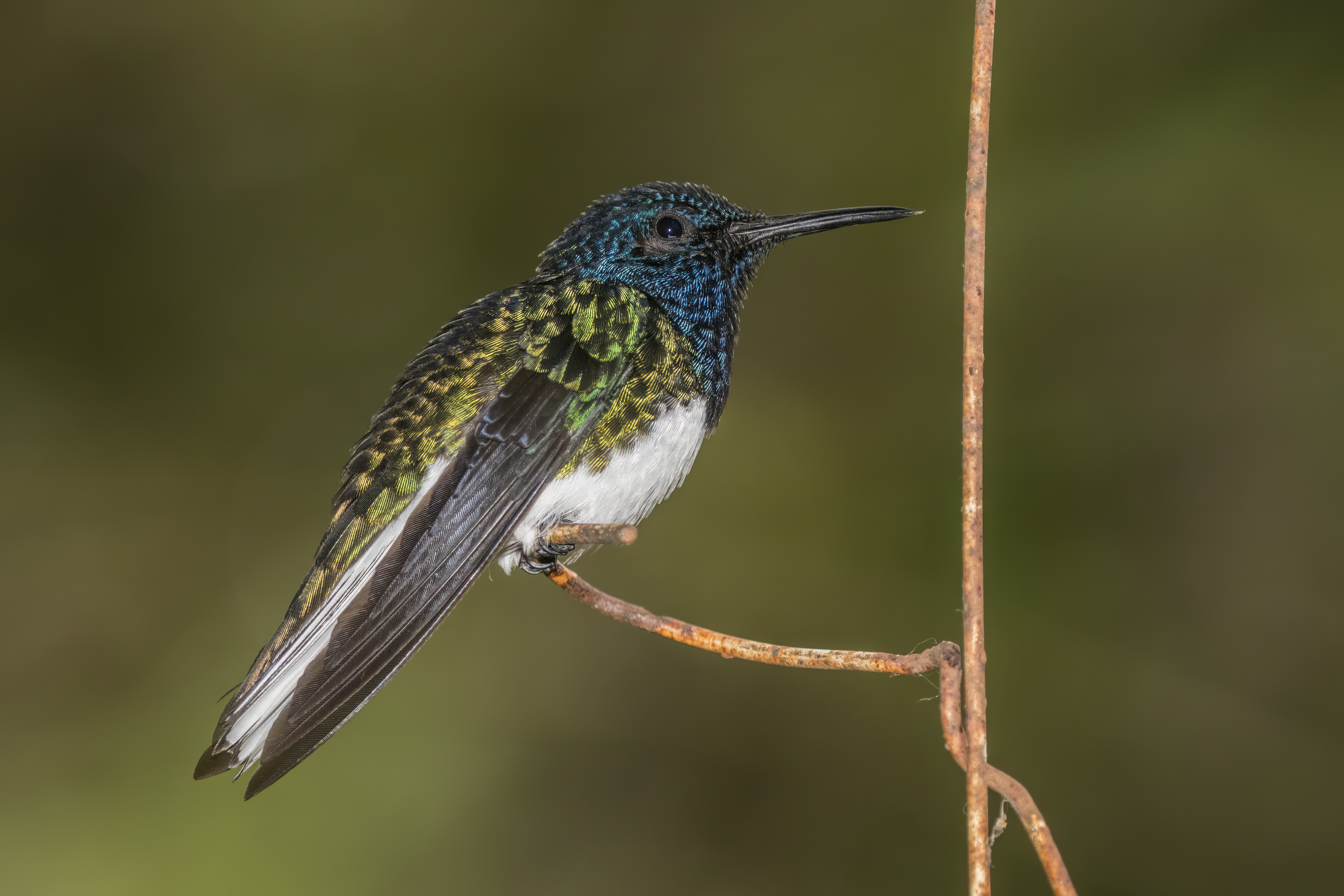
Male F. m. mellivora, Panama

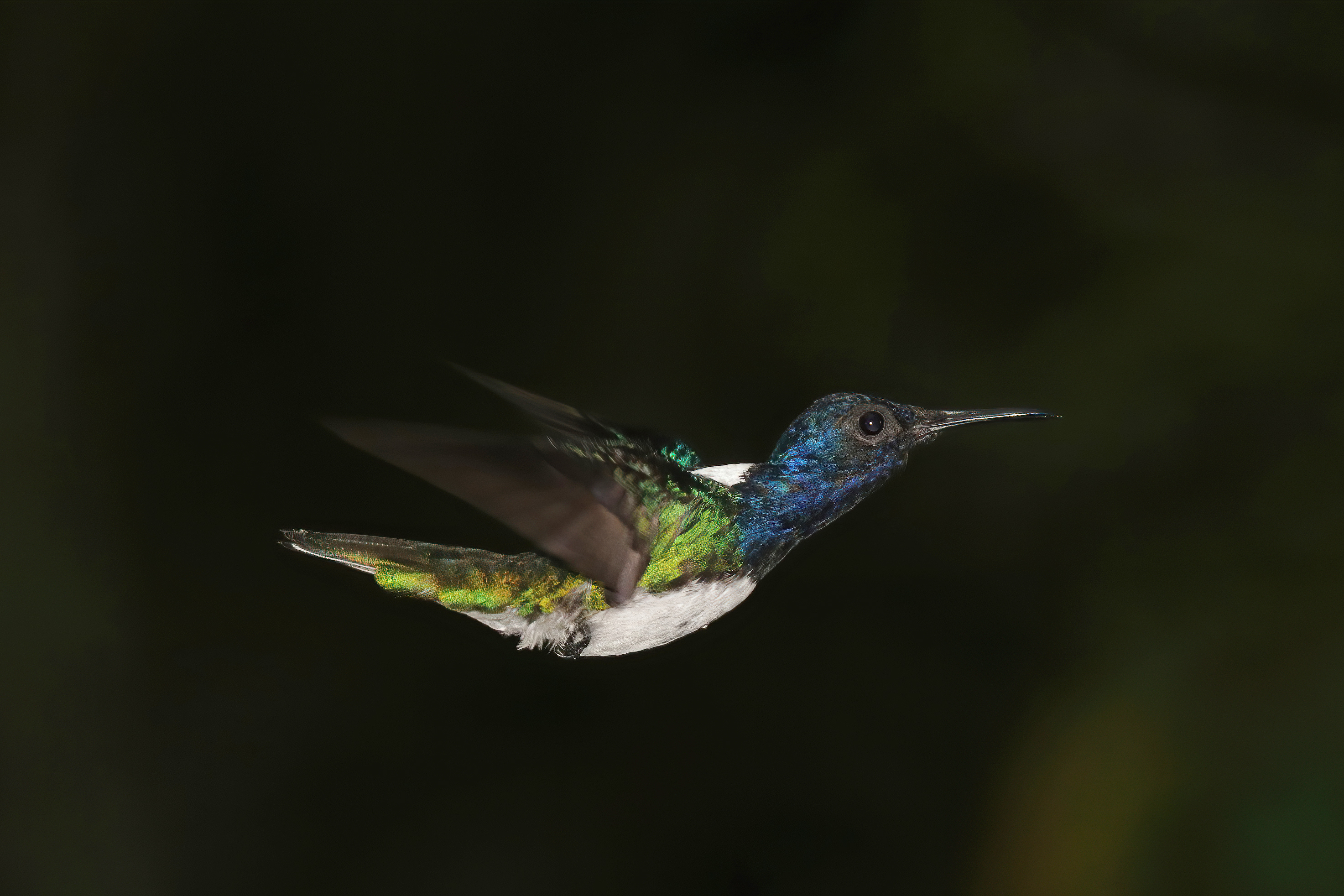
Male F. m. mellivora, Panama
