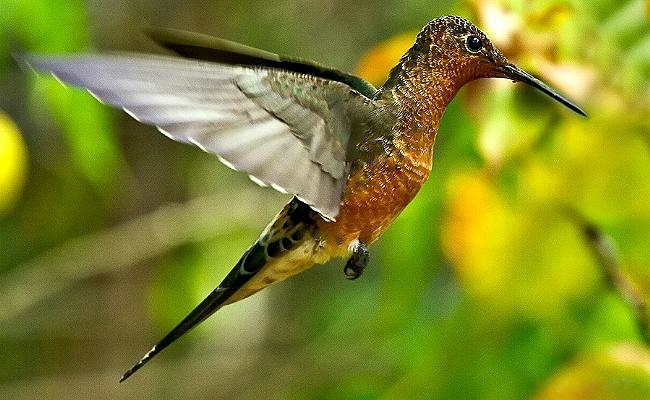
- A migratory giant hummingbird (Patagona gigas) in Chile

Scientific classification
- Kingdom: Animalia
- Phylum: Chordata
- Class: Aves
- Order: Apodiformes
- Family: Trochilidae
- Subfamily: Patagoninae
- Genus: Patagona; G.R. Gray, 1840

Species
- P. gigas; P. peruviana

= Patagona =

Genus of bird

The giant hummingbirds are hummingbirds of the genus Patagona. The genus includes two species, the sedentary giant hummingbird and the migratory giant hummingbird, which are the largest and second largest species of hummingbird respectively.

== Taxonomy ==
The giant hummingbird was described and illustrated in 1824 by the French ornithologist Louis Pierre Vieillot based on a specimen that Vieillot mistakenly believed had been collected in Brazil. The type locality was designated as Valparaíso in Chile by Carl Eduard Hellmayr in 1945. The giant hummingbird was the only species placed in the genus Patagona when introduced by George Robert Gray in 1840.

Molecular phylogenetic studies have shown that the giant hummingbird has no close relatives and is sister to the hummingbird subfamily Trochilinae, a large clade containing the tribes Lampornithini (mountain gems), Mellisugini (bees) and Trochilini (emeralds).

Two subspecies were previously recognised:

- P. g. peruviana Boucard, 1893 – southwest Colombia to north Chile and northwest Argentina
- P. g. gigas (Vieillot, 1824) – central, south Chile and west-central Argentina

These subspecies are thought to have emerged as a result of partial geographical separation of populations by volcanic activity in the Andes predating the Miocene; however, there remain areas of contact between the species, hence the lack of full speciation. The proposed phylogenetic system for hummingbirds suggested by McGuire et al. (2009) accommodated the possible elevation of these subspecies to species rank.

== Description ==
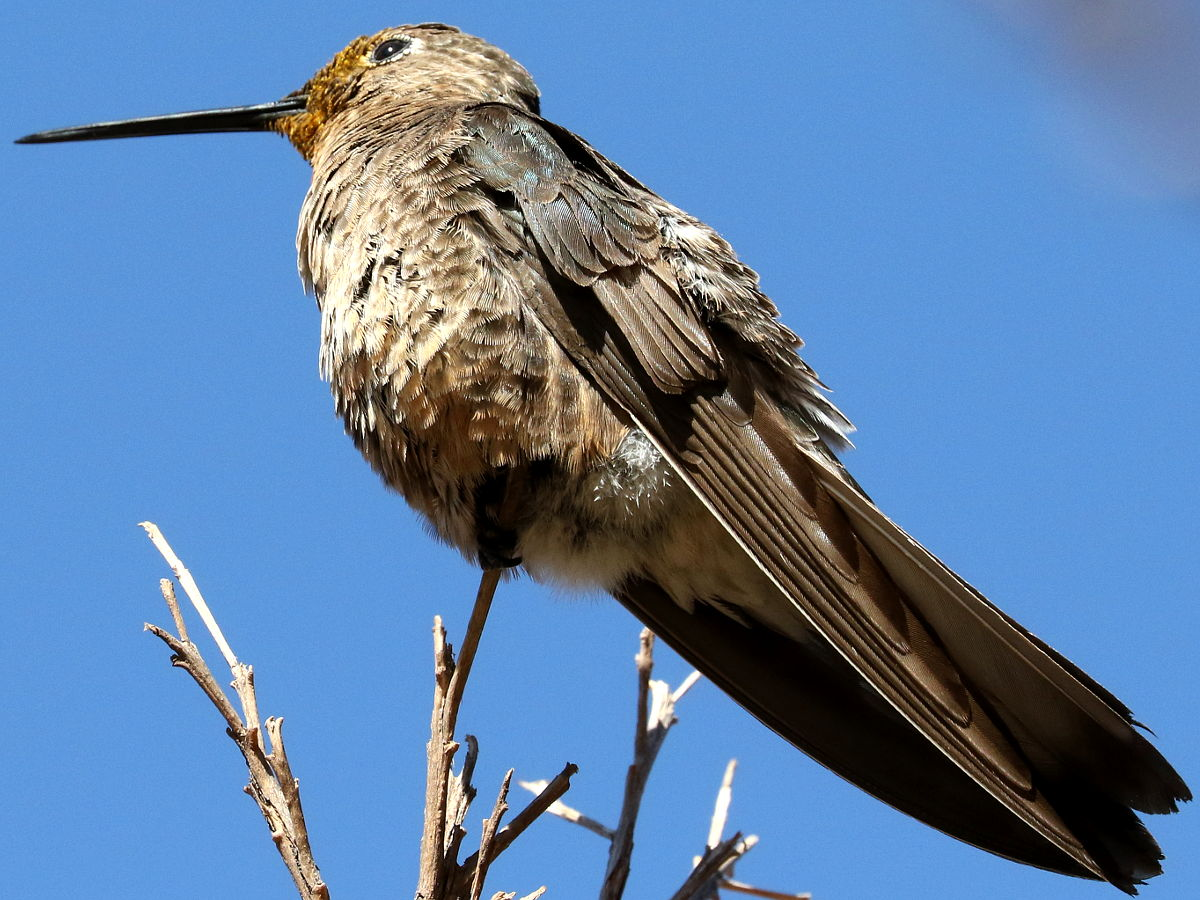
In Cusco, Peru

Giant hummingbirds can be identified by their large size and characteristics such as the presence of an eye-ring, straight bill longer than the head, dull colouration, very long wings (approaching the tail tip when stowed), long and moderately forked tail, tarsi feathered to the toes and large, sturdy feet. There is no difference between the sexes. Juveniles have small corrugations on the lateral beak culmen.

Prior to the giant hummingbird being split into the Northern and Southern species, it was described as weighing 18–24 g (0.63–0.85 oz) and having a wingspan of approximately 21.5 cm (8.5 in) and length of 23 cm (9.1 in). Although the Northern species is larger, both are approximately the same length as a European starling or a northern cardinal, though giant hummingbirds are considerably lighter because it has a slender build and long bill, making the body a smaller proportion of the total length. This weight is almost twice that of the heaviest hummingbird species outside of the genus Patagona and ten times that of the smallest, the bee hummingbird.

The giant hummingbird occasionally glides in flight, a behavior very rare among hummingbirds. Its elongated wings allow more efficient glides than do those of other hummingbirds. The giant hummingbird's voice is a distinctive loud, sharp and whistling "chip".

== Behaviour ==
Hummingbirds are extremely agile and acrobatic flyers, regularly partaking in sustained hovering flight, often used not only to feed on the wing but to protect their territory and court mates. The giant hummingbird is typical in that it will brazenly defend its energy-rich flower territory from other species and other giant hummingbirds. These birds are typically seen alone, in pairs or small family groups.

=== Flight, anatomy and physiology ===
The giant hummingbird hovers at an average of 15 wing beats per second, a slow rate for a hummingbird. Its resting heart rate is 300 beats per minute, with a peak rate in flight of 1020 beats per minute. Energy requirements for hummingbirds do not scale evenly with size increases, meaning a larger bird such as giant hummingbird requires more energy per gram to hover than a smaller bird.

The giant hummingbird requires an estimated 4.3 calories of food energy per hour to sustain its flight. This requirement along with the low oxygen availability and thin air (generating little lift) at the high altitudes where the giant hummingbird usually lives suggest that it is close to the viable maximum size for a hummingbird.

=== Food and feeding ===
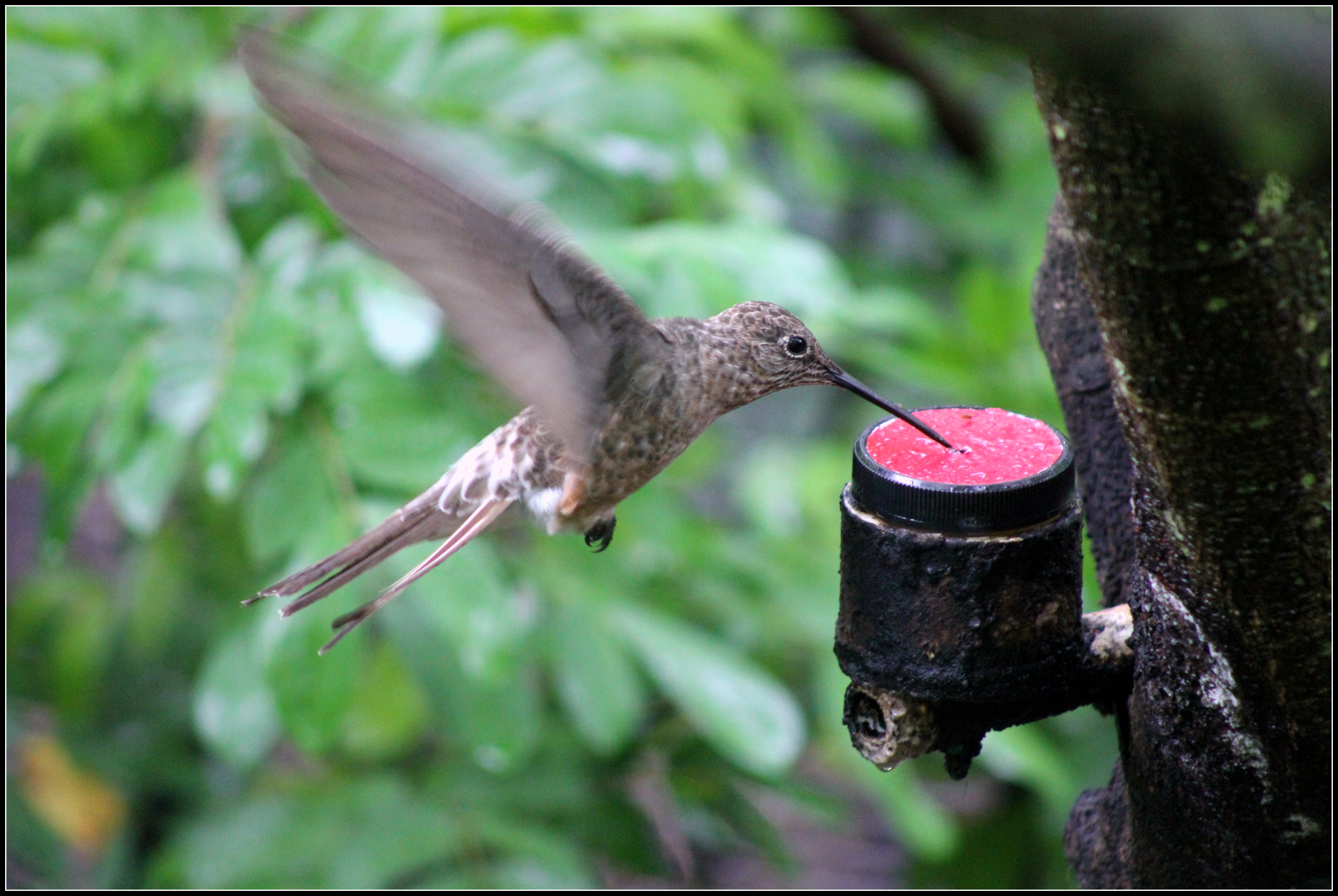
Giant hummingbird

The giant hummingbird feeds mainly on nectar, visiting a range of flowers. The female giant hummingbird has been observed ingesting sources of calcium (sand, soil, slaked lime and wood ash) after the reproductive season to replenish the calcium used in egg production; the low calcium content of nectar necessitates these extra sources. Similarly, a nectar-based diet is low in protein and various dietary minerals, and this is countered by consuming insects.

It regularly feeds from the flowers of the genus Puya in Chile, with which it has a symbiotic relationship, trading pollination for food. As a large hovering bird, particularly at high altitudes, the giant hummingbird has extremely high metabolic requirements. It is known to feed from columnar cacti, including Oreocereus celsianus and Echinopsis atacamensis ssp. pasacana, and Salvia haenkei.

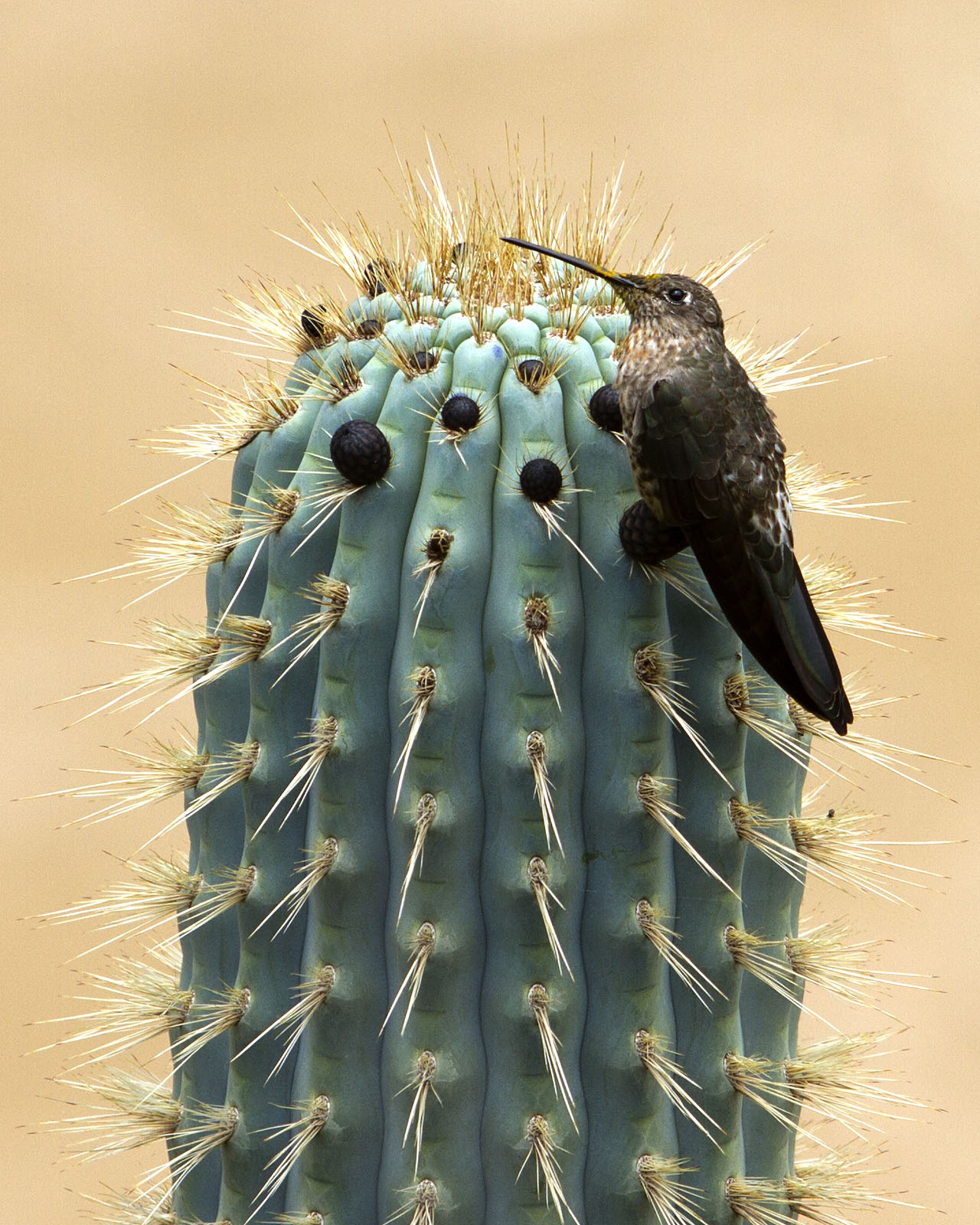
Giant hummingbird on cactus in Peru

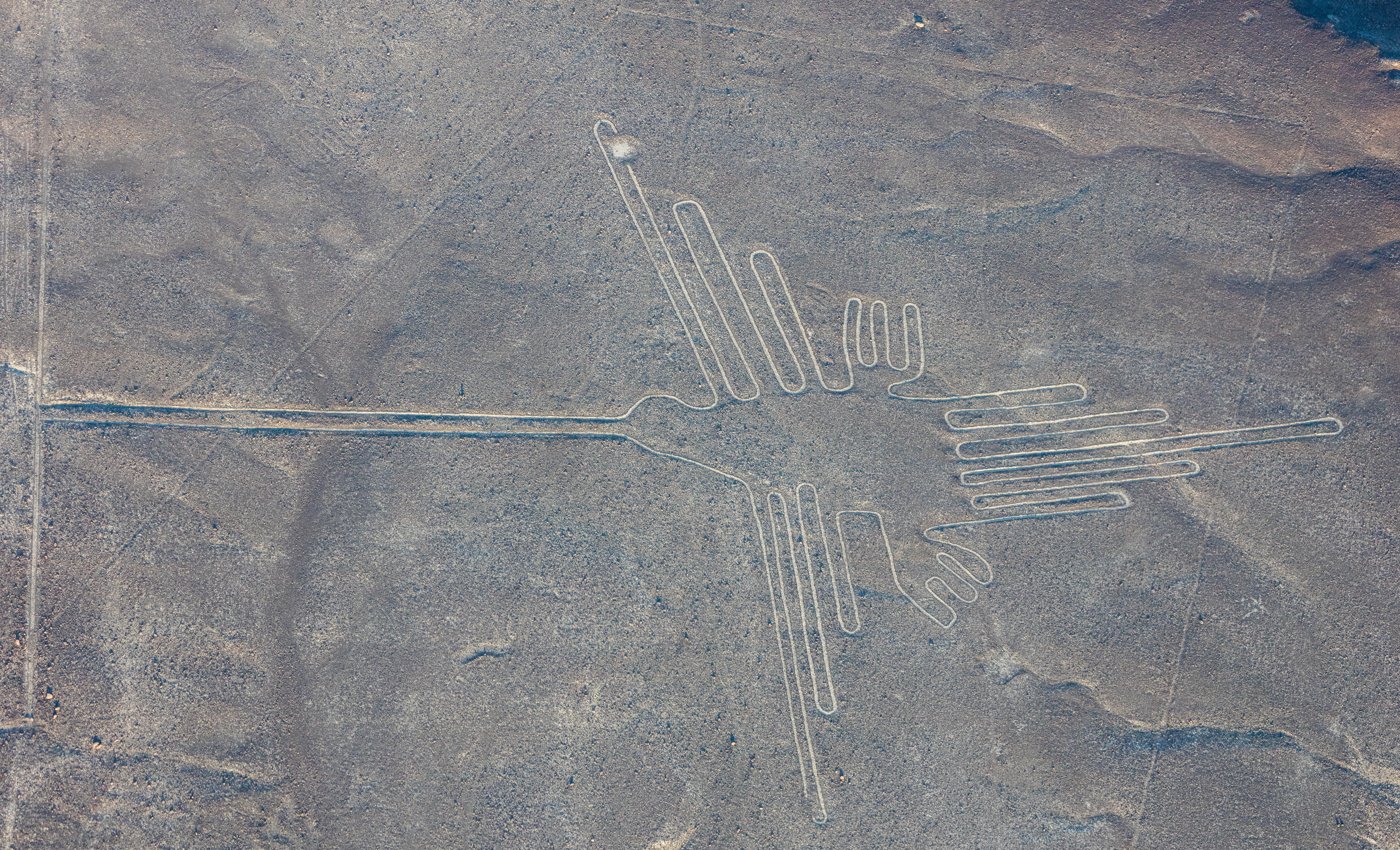
Aerial image of geoglyph in the Nazca Desert, Peru with similar features to the giant hummingbird

Considering the energy-rich nature of nectar as a food source, it attracts a large range of visitors apart from the hummingbird, which has coevolved with a plant to be the flower's most efficient pollinator. These other visitors, because they are not designed to access the well-hidden nectar, often damage the flowers (for example, piercing them at the base) and prevent further nectar production. Because of its high energy requirements, the giant hummingbird alters its foraging behaviour as a direct response to nectar robbing from other birds and animals, and this reduces the viability of the hummingbird in an area with many nectar robbers, as well as indirectly affecting the plants by reducing pollination. If alien species are introduced that become nectar thieves, it is reasonable to predict that their activities will significantly impact the local ecosystem. This could prove to be a future risk for the giant hummingbird populations because they sit close to the physical limit in their metabolic demands.

=== Breeding ===
There is little known of the giant hummingbird's breeding behaviour, but some generalisations can be inferred from other hummingbird species. Hummingbird males tend to have polygynous, occasionally promiscuous, behaviours, and no involvement after copulation. The female builds the nest and lays a clutch of two eggs during the summer. A giant hummingbird nest is small considering the size of the bird, typically made near water sources and perched on a branch of a tree or shrub parallel to the ground.
