= Adolphe Boucard =

French ornithologist

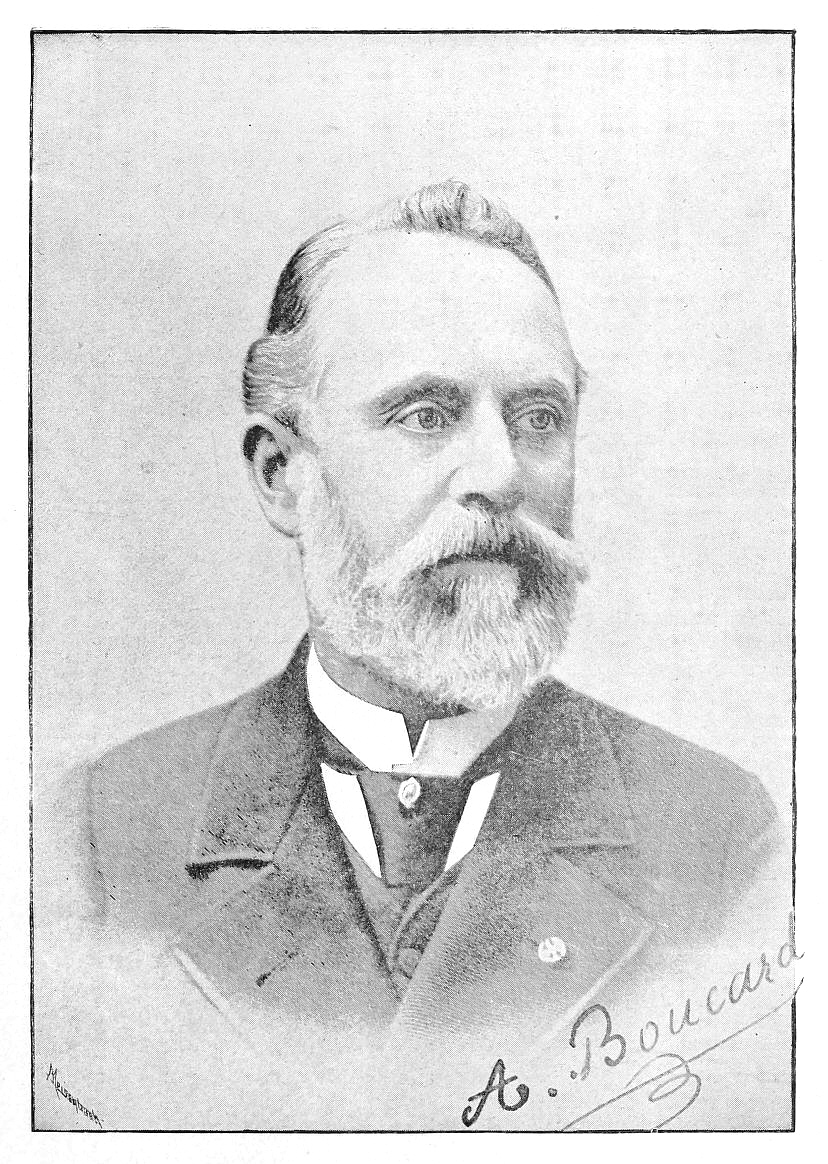
Portrait (1891)

Adolphe Boucard (1839 – 15 March 1905) was a French ornithologist and trader in specimens who collected extensively in Mexico and Central America. He lived in San Francisco between 1851 and 1852, at the height of the California Gold Rush. He concentrated on collecting hummingbirds, sold scientific bird skins to natural history museums, and supplied the plume trade. He collected birds on expeditions to southern Mexico between 1854 and 1867, and many specimens were sold to P.L. Sclater. By 1865 he had become a foreign corresponding member of the Zoological Society of London. In 1891 he moved to London and set up a taxidermist company, Boucard, Pottier & Co. He published a periodical The Hummingbird (1891–95), which was stopped shortly after he moved to the Isle of Wight in 1894, the same year in which he published Travels of a Naturalist. He died at his son's home in Hampstead in 1905.

== Taxa named in honor of Boucard ==
Seven species of birds are named after Boucard, including Boucard's tinamou Crypturellus boucardi (also known as the slaty-breasted tinamou) described in 1859 by Philip Sclater. A subspecies of lizard, Phrynosoma orbiculare boucardii, was named in his honor by Auguste Duméril and Marie Firmin Bocourt in 1870; this subspecies is sometimes considered a synonym of Phrynosoma orbiculare cortezii.

== Other sources ==
- Mearns, Barbara; Mearns, Richard (1998). The Bird Collectors. London: Academic Press. 472 pp. ISBN 978-0124874404.
- Rounds, R. Stowell (1990). Men and Birds in South America 1492 to 1900. Fort Bragg, California: Q.E.D. Press. 190 pp. ISBN 978-0936609164.
