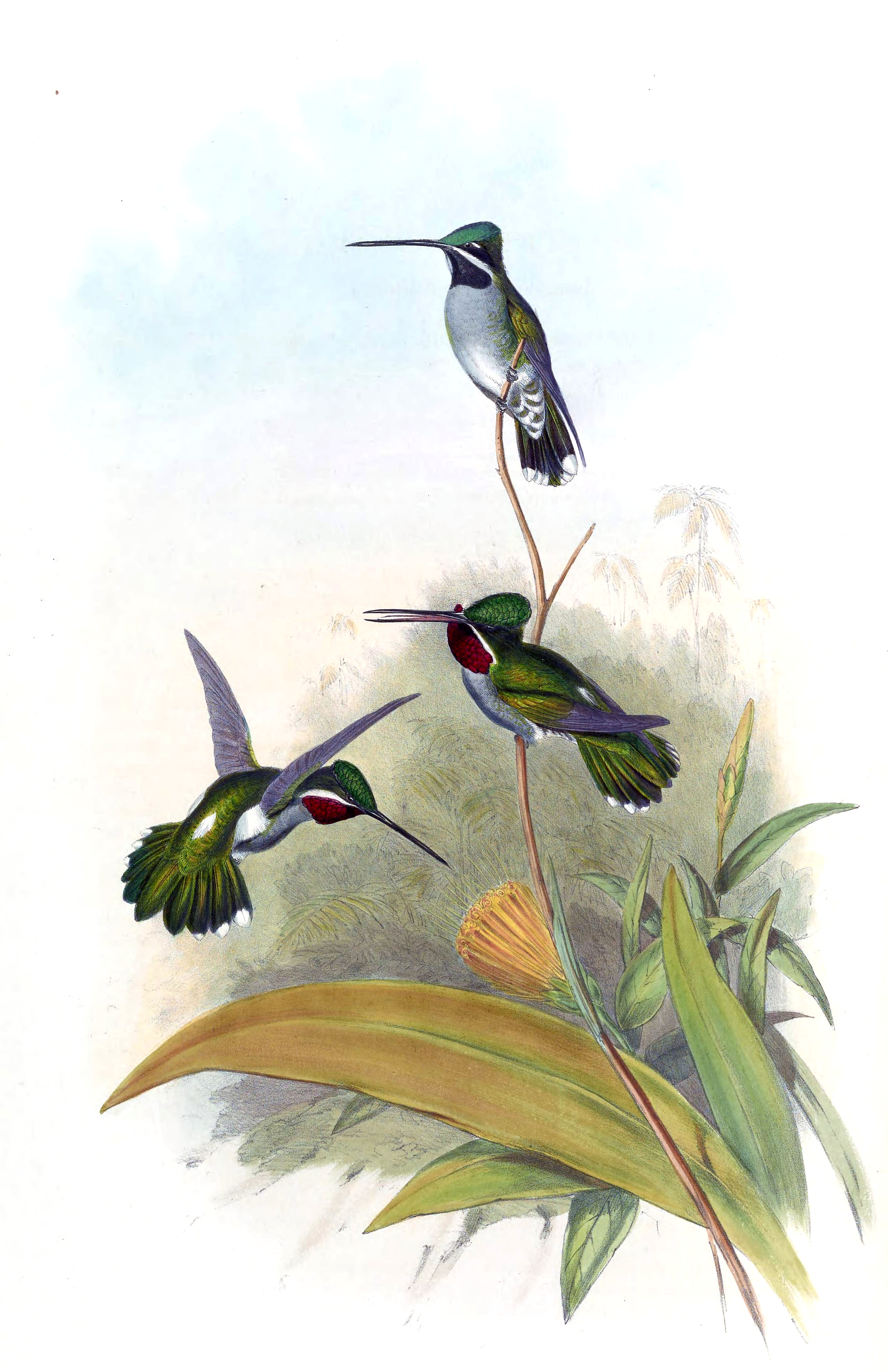
- Long-billed starthroat (Heliomaster longirostris); John Gould lithograph.

Scientific classification
- Kingdom: Animalia
- Phylum: Chordata
- Class: Aves
- Order: Apodiformes
- Family: Trochilidae
- Tribe: Lampornithini
- Genus: Heliomaster; Bonaparte, 1850

Type species
- Ornismya angelae Lesson, 1833

Species
- 4, see text

= Starthroat =

Genus of birds

The starthroats in Heliomaster is a hummingbird genus in the subfamily Trochilinae.

== Species ==
The genus contains the following species:

Genus Heliomaster – Bonaparte, 1850 – four species
Common name	Scientific name and subspecies	Range	Size and ecology	IUCN status and estimated population
Plain-capped starthroat	Heliomaster constantii (Delattre, 1843) Three subspecies: H. c. constantii; H. c. leocadiae; H. c. pinicola	western Mexico, (the Sierra Madre Occidentals), to southern Costa Rica	Size: Habitat: Diet:	LC
Long-billed starthroat	Heliomaster longirostris (Audebert & Vieillot, 1801) Three subspecies: H. l. longirostris; H. l. pallidiceps; H. l. albicrissa	southern Mexico to Panama, from Colombia south and east to Bolivia and Brazil, and on Trinidad	Size: Habitat: Diet:	LC
Stripe-breasted starthroat Male Female	Heliomaster squamosus (Temminck, 1823)	eastern and southeastern Brazil.	Size: Habitat: Diet:	LC
Blue-tufted starthroat	Heliomaster furcifer (Shaw, 1812)	Argentina, Bolivia, Brazil, Colombia, Paraguay, Uruguay, and possibly Ecuador.	Size: Habitat: Diet:	LC
