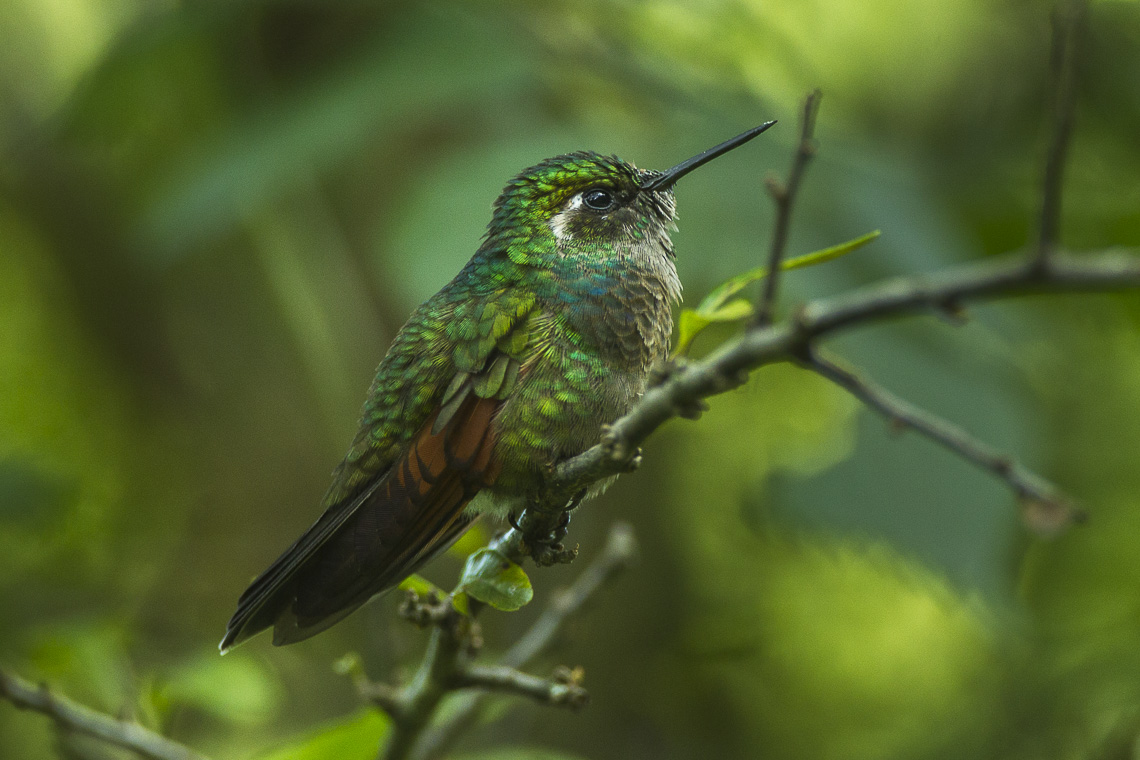

Conservation status
- Least Concern (IUCN 3.1)
- CITES Appendix II

Scientific classification
- Kingdom: Animalia
- Phylum: Chordata
- Class: Aves
- Order: Apodiformes
- Family: Trochilidae
- Tribe: Lampornithini
- Genus: Lamprolaima; Reichenbach, 1854
- Species: L. rhami

Binomial name
- Lamprolaima rhami (Lesson, 1839)
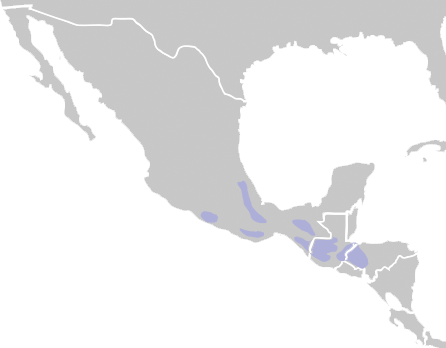

= Garnet-throated hummingbird =

Species of bird

The garnet-throated hummingbird (Lamprolaima rhami) is a species of hummingbird in tribe Lampornithini of subfamily Trochilinae. It is found in El Salvador, Guatemala, Honduras, and Mexico.

== Taxonomy and systematics ==
The garnet-throated hummingbird is the only member of genus Lamprolaima, a name which is a combination of two Greek words: lampros, meaning brilliant or radiant and laimos, meaning throat. The specific epithet commemorates Henry Casimir de Rham Jr., an American naturalist and son of the Swiss diplomat Henry Casimir de Rham.

== Description ==
The garnet-throated hummingbird is 12 to 12.4 cm (4.7 to 4.9 in) long and weighs 5.6 to 7.1 g (0.20 to 0.25 oz). Both sexes have a short, straight, black bill. The adult male's upperparts are iridescent green. Much of the face is black, with a small white spot behind the eye. The gorget is shining rosy pink and the breast iridescent violet-blue. The rest of the underparts are blackish with mottled green flanks. The wings are rufous with dark brown tips to the feathers. The tail is dark purple with gray tips on the outer feathers. The adult female also has iridescent green upperparts. The underparts are dusky gray, usually with small pinkish dots on the throat. The wings and tail are similar to the male's but the outer tail feathers have white tips. Juvenile males are similar to the adult female but with darker underparts and buff fringes on the chest feathers. Juvenile females are similar to the adult but with buff fringes on the head feathers.

== Distribution and habitat ==
The garnet-throated hummingbird is found discontinuously from Mexico's Guerrero, Puebla, and Veracruz states south through Guatemala into El Salvador and Honduras. It inhabits the interior and edges of tropical forest, cloudforest, and pine-oak forest and also scrublands. In elevation it ranges between 1,200 and 3,000 m (3,900 and 9,800 ft) but is most numerous between 1,500 and 2,300 m (4,900 and 7,500 ft); in Honduras it occurs only above 1,600 m (5,200 ft).

== Behavior ==
=== Movement ===
The garnet-throated hummingbird moves between higher elevation during the breeding season to lower elevation outside it.

== Feeding ==
The garnet-throated hummingbird feeds on nectar from flowering shrubs and trees, especially those of genera Inga and Erythrina. It tends to forage below 10 m (30 ft) of the ground. Males defend feeding territories. In addition to nectar, the species feeds on small insects captured by hawking from a perch.

== Breeding ==
The garnet-throated hummingbird breeds in April and May on the Atlantic slope and between December and March on the Pacific slope. The female builds a bulky cup nest of moss, leaf parts, and pine needles lined with softer plant fibers. It often attaches the nest to exposed roots on earth banks such as those of streams. The incubation length and time to fledging are not known.

=== Vocalization ===
The garnet-throated hummingbird's song is "a soft, gruff, dry, crackling warble intermixed by nasal, gurgling notes." Its calls include "a nasal 'nyik' and 'choiw', high-pitched chips and a sharp, slightly buzzy 'tis-i-tyu-tyu'."

== Status ==
The IUCN has assessed the garnet-throated hummingbird as being of least concern, though its population size and trend are not known. It is locally common, even in human-modified environments as long as some forest remains. However, the Mexican government at one time considered it Threatened.
