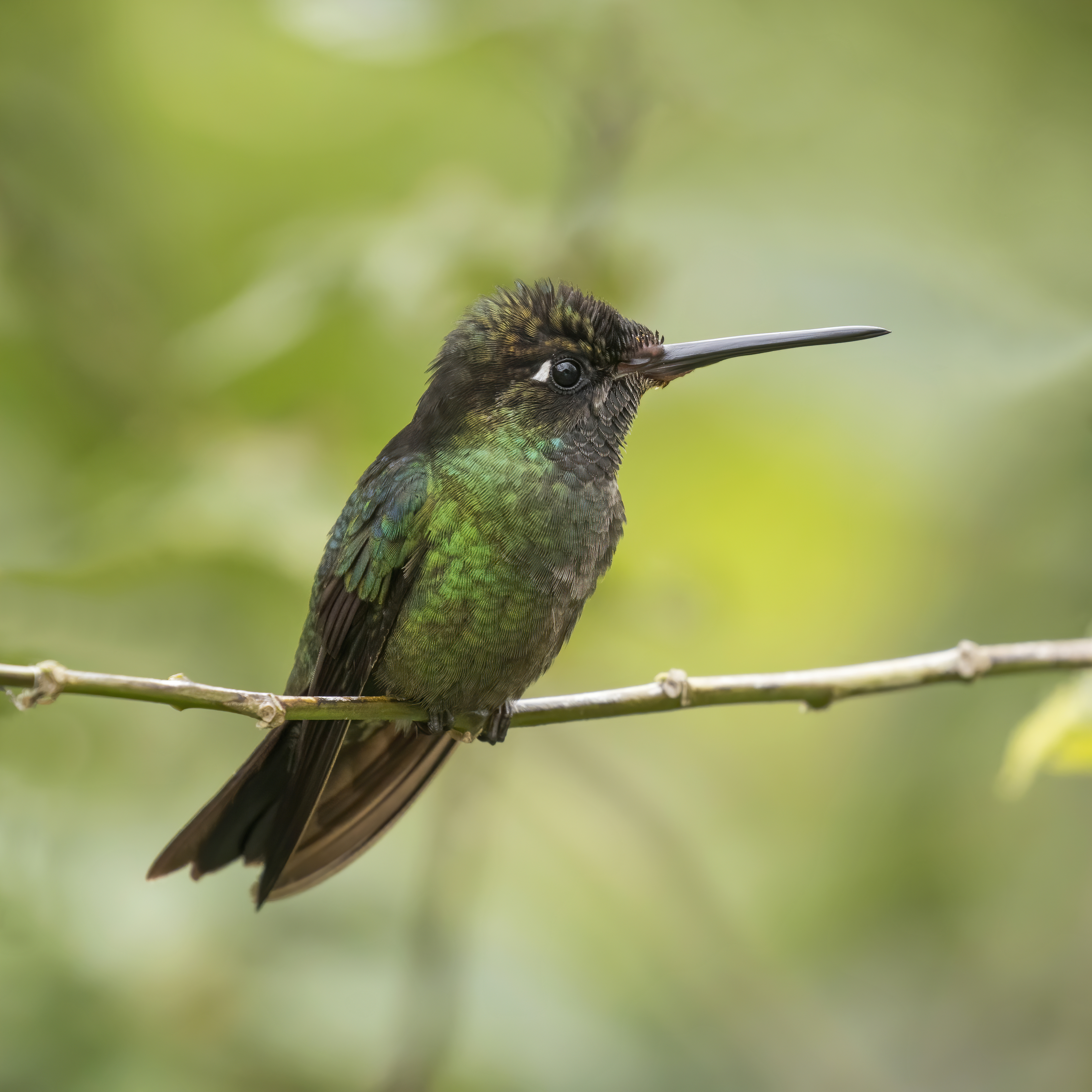
- Male
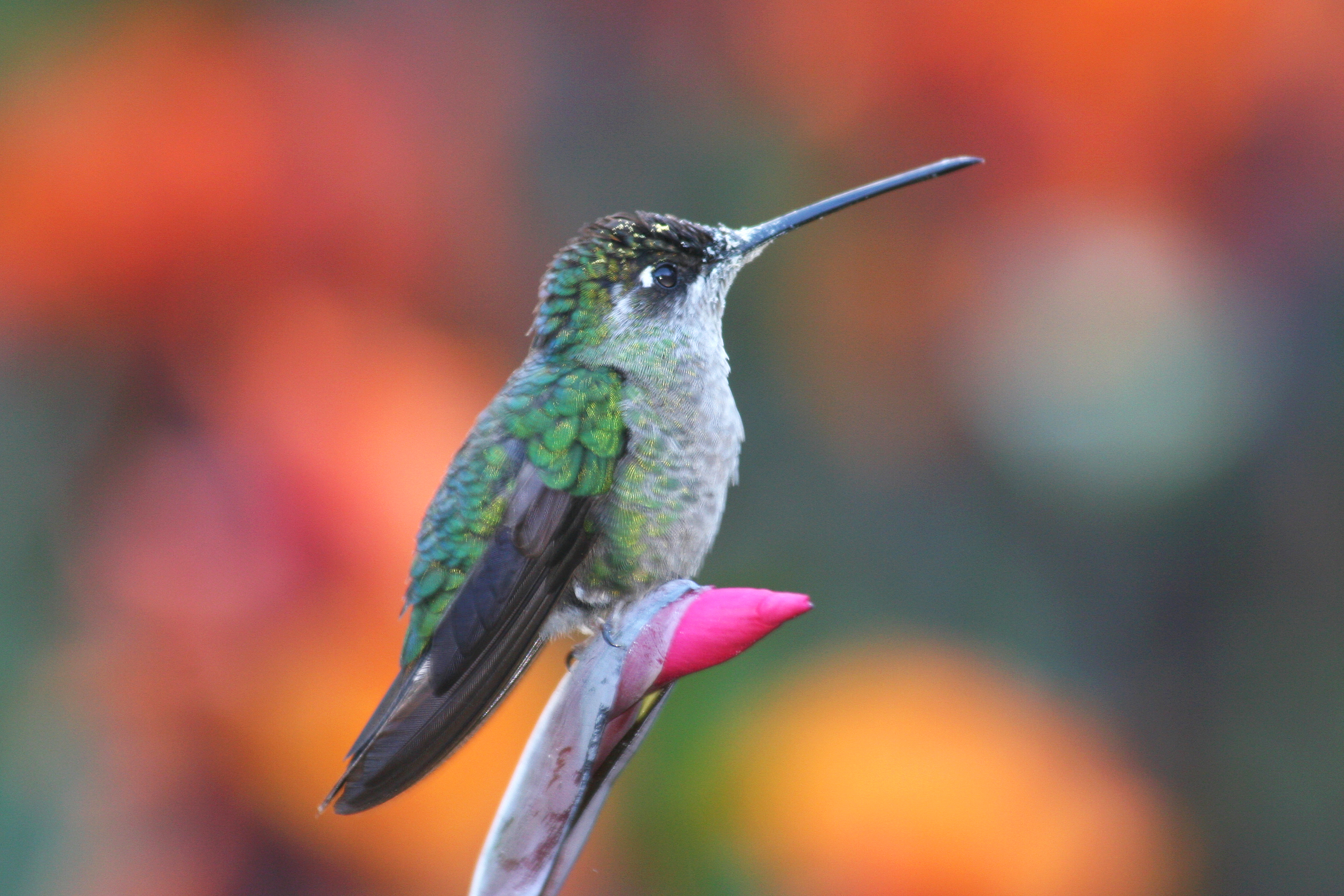
- Female

Conservation status
- Least Concern (IUCN 3.1)(See Status section)
- CITES Appendix II (CITES)

Scientific classification
- Kingdom: Animalia
- Phylum: Chordata
- Class: Aves
- Clade: Strisores
- Order: Apodiformes
- Family: Trochilidae
- Genus: Eugenes
- Species: E. spectabilis

Binomial name
- Eugenes spectabilis (Lawrence, 1867)

Synonyms
- Eugenes fulgens subsp. spectabilis (Lawrence, 1867); Heliomaster spectabilis Lawrence, 1867

= Talamanca hummingbird =

Species of bird

The Talamanca hummingbird (Eugenes spectabilis) or admirable hummingbird, is a species of hummingbird in the "mountain gems", tribe Lampornithini in subfamily Trochilinae. It is found in Costa Rica and Panama.

== Taxonomy and systematics ==
What is now the Talamanca hummingbird Eugenes spectabilis was originally described as a subspecies of the magnificent hummingbird (E. fulgens). Beginning in 2017 the North American Classification Committee of the American Ornithological Society (NACC), the International Ornithological Committee (IOC), and the Clements taxonomy split the magnificent hummingbird into the Talamanca hummingbird and Rivoli's hummingbird. The latter retained the binomial E. fulgens because of the principle of priority. However, as of 2020, BirdLife International's Handbook of the Birds of the World (HBW) retains the single species "magnificent" hummingbird treatment with two subspecies.

The Talamanca hummingbird is monotypic.

== Description ==
The Talamanca hummingbird is about 13 cm (5.1 in) long. Males weigh about 10 g (0.35 oz) and females 8.5 g (0.30 oz). Both sexes have a long straight black bill and a small white spot behind the eye.

Adult males have a dull black forehead with a dark green gloss, a metallic violet blue to purple crown, and a dull black nape and upper back. Much of the rest of the face is dark green, and the lores are a deep black. The rest of the upperparts and the tail are bronzy green to golden green; the tail feathers sometimes have grayish tips. The chin and gorget are metallic bluish green. The breast and belly are dark bronzy green, on the belly mixed with brownish gray. The undertail coverts are dull bronzy green with pale buff edges.

Adult females do not have the iridescent crown and gorget of the male. Their upperparts are dull dark green and most of the face is sooty black. The two innermost pairs of tail feathers are also dull dark green and the three outer pairs bronzy green with a black band near the end and brownish gray tips. The throat is brownish gray with buff tips to the feathers, the flanks dark green, and the breast, belly, and undertail coverts dull brownish gray with a dull green wash.

Immature birds are similar to the adult female, but have darker brown underparts with a dull buff scaly appearance. The upperparts' feathers, especially those of the crown and neck, have buffy fringes.

== Distribution and habitat ==
The Talamanca hummingbird is found in mountains from central Costa Rica into western Panama. In Costa Rica it occurs in the Cordillera Central and Cordillera de Talamanca and in Panama only in the Volcán Barú massif of Chiriquí Province. It inhabits oak forests and is partial to the forest's edges and clearings, and also is found in nearby secondary forest. In Costa Rica it occurs from 2,000 m (6,600 ft) up to treeline but is most common above 2,500 m (8,200 ft) and is occasionally found as low as 1,850 m (6,100 ft). In Panama it occurs between 2,000 and 2,400 m (6,600 and 7,900 ft).

== Behavior ==
=== Movement ===
The Talamanca hummingbird is generally sedentary, but some individuals move to lower elevations in what might be a regular migration.

=== Feeding ===
Talamanca hummingbirds feed on nectar from a variety of flowering plants, though the full list of sources has not been defined. Males defend flower patches in the lower storeys of the forest and sometimes also feed in the canopy. Females forage by trap-lining, visiting a circuit of flowering plants. The species probably also feeds on small arthropods though details are lacking; the closely related Rivoli's hummingbird captures them in mid-air or by gleaning from vegetation while hovering.

=== Breeding ===
The Talamanca hummingbird's breeding season in Costa Rica spans from November to March; it has not been defined in Panama. It builds a cup nest of plant down and other fine fibers and covers the outside with moss and lichens. The nest is typically placed at the tip of a dangling bamboo stem between 1.5 and 3 m (5 and 10 ft) above the ground. The incubation period is not known; the time from hatch to fledging is at least 25 days.

=== Vocalization ===
The Talamanca hummingbird's song is "a soft, low-pitched song of burbling, scratchy, buzzy notes." It makes "a rapid stream of high, clear, liquid chips" during aggressive encounters. Another call is "a rather guttural, rolling nrrt or drrk."

== Status ==
The IUCN follows HBW taxonomy and so treats Rivoli's and Talamanca hummingbirds as a single species assessed as being of Least Concern. As a whole it has a large range and an apparently stable population, though the population size is not known. The Talamanca hummingbird is considered fairly common throughout its range. However, it "is vulnerable to habitat loss and degradation, although ample forest remains in the Cordillera de Talamanca."

== Gallery ==
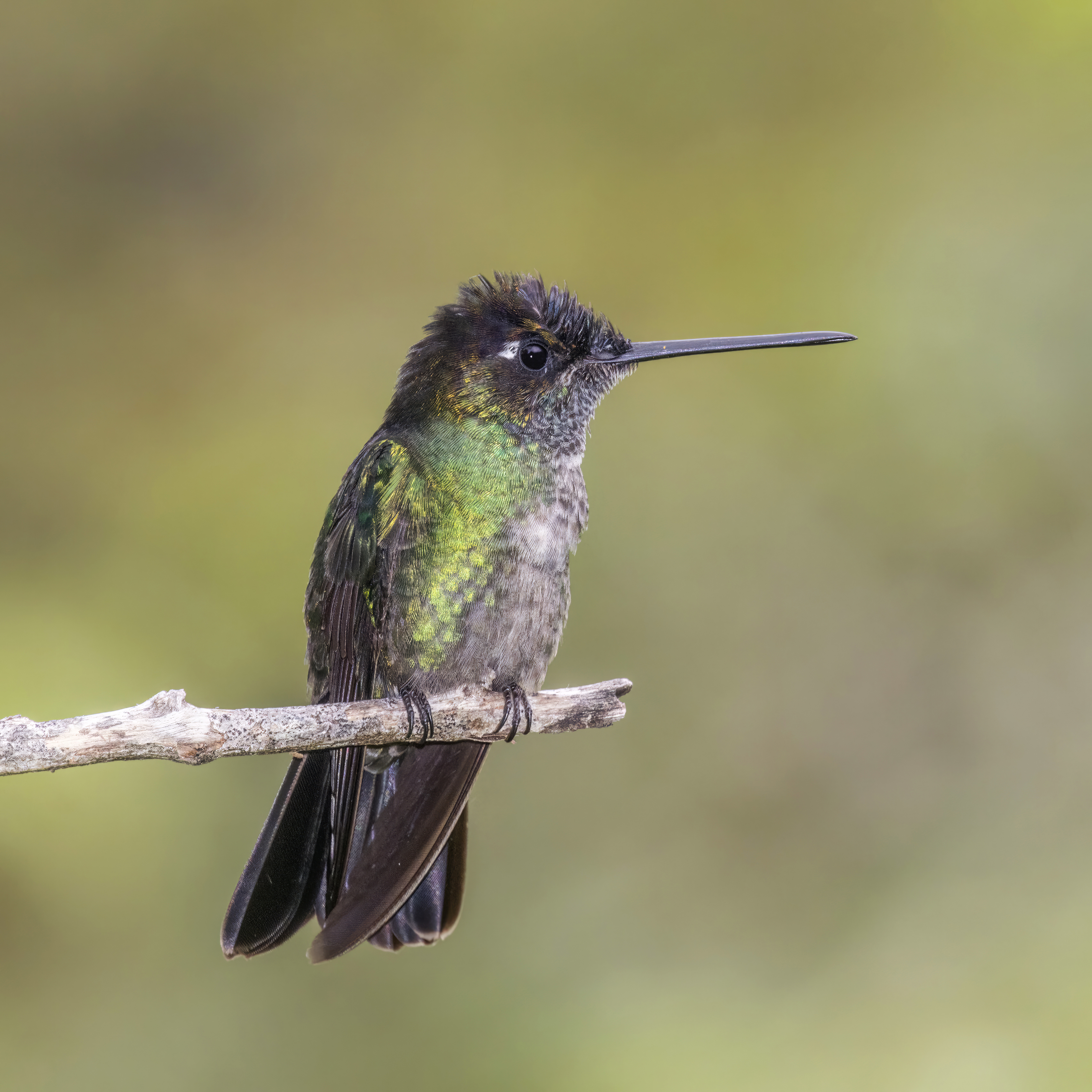
Male

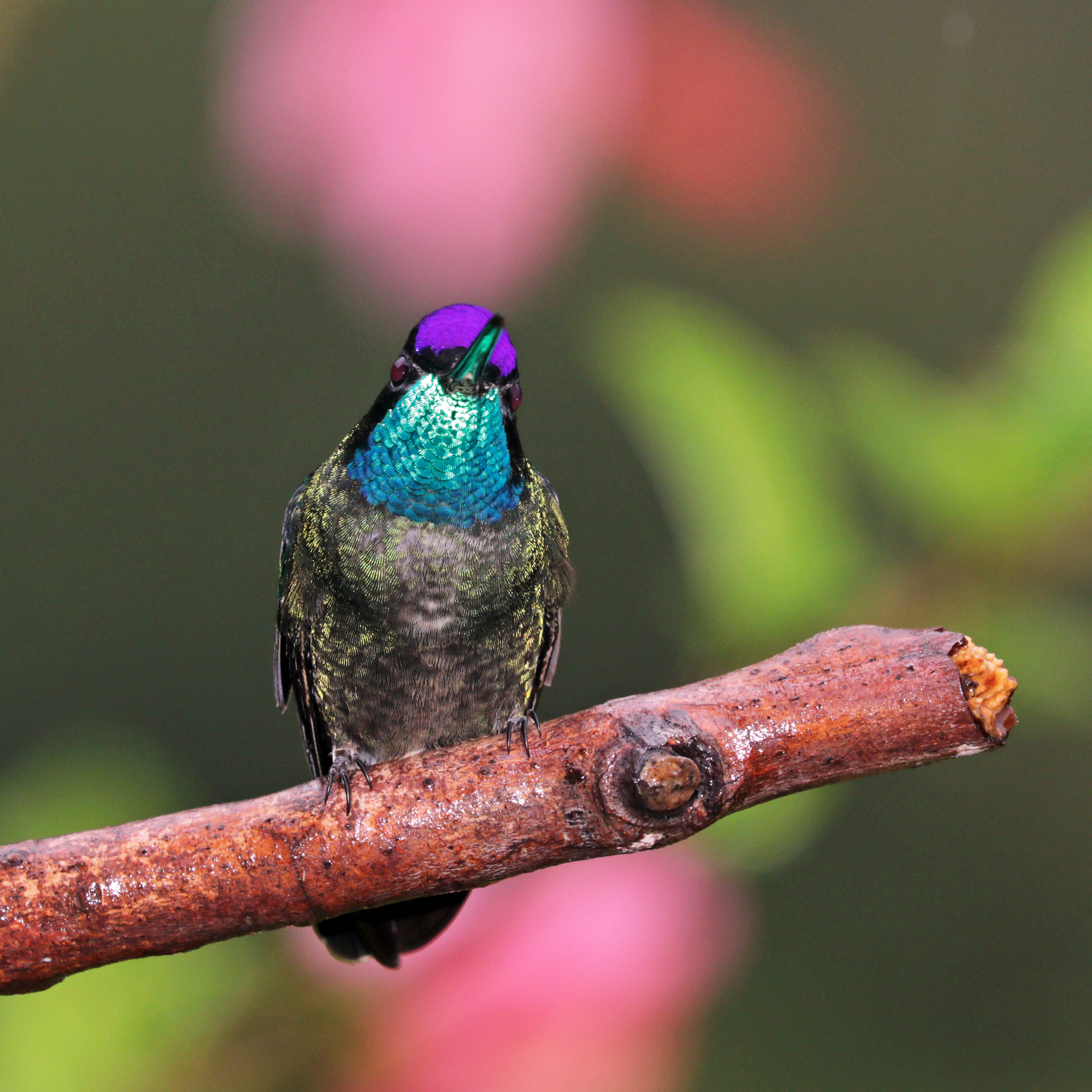
Male
showing its bright colors (photo adjusted to increase vibrancy and saturation)

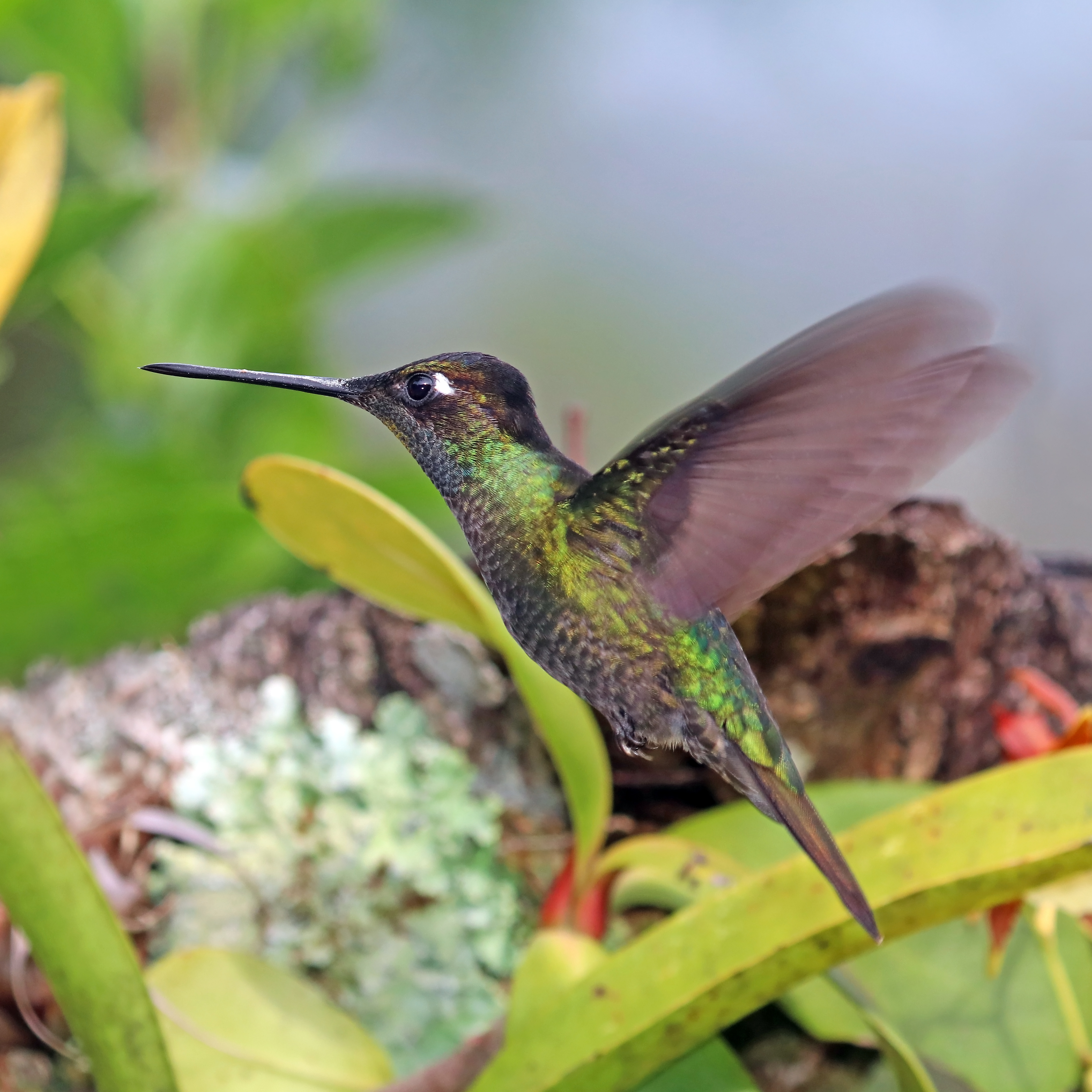
Male
