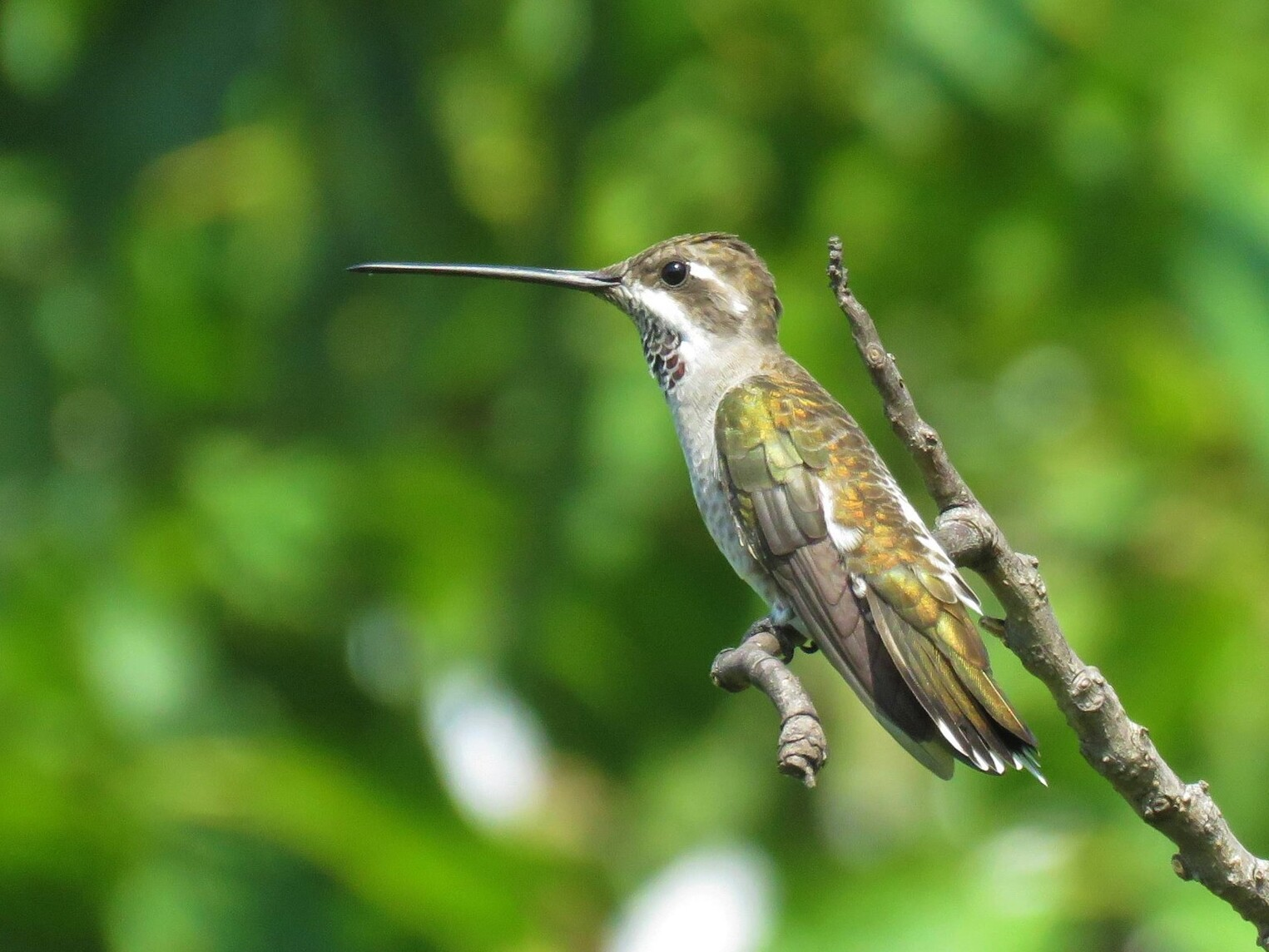
- Male
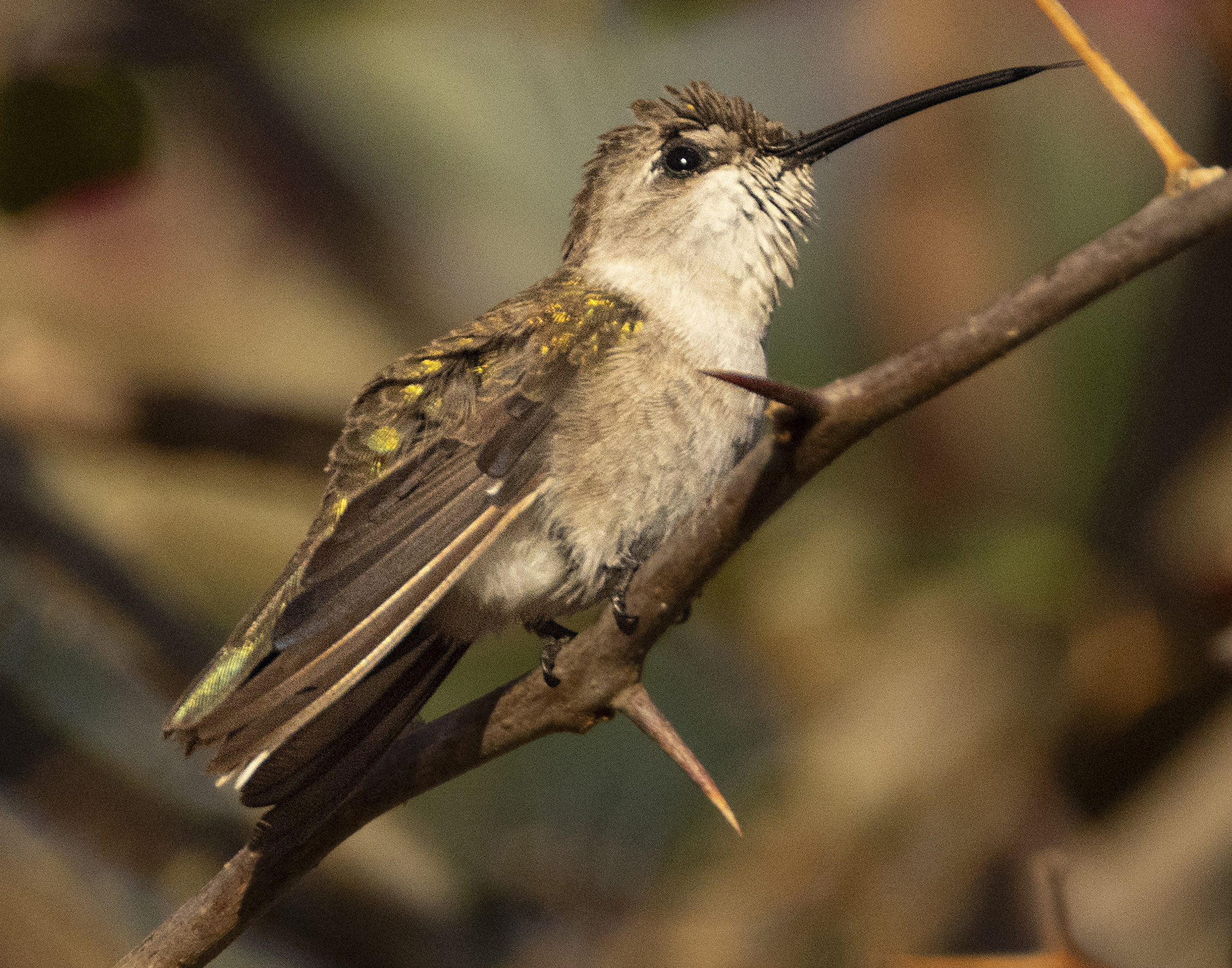
- Female

Conservation status
- Least Concern (IUCN 3.1)
- CITES Appendix II

Scientific classification
- Kingdom: Animalia
- Phylum: Chordata
- Class: Aves
- Order: Apodiformes
- Family: Trochilidae
- Genus: Heliomaster
- Species: H. constantii

Binomial name
- Heliomaster constantii (Delattre, 1843)

= Plain-capped starthroat =

Species of hummingbird

The plain-capped starthroat (Heliomaster constantii) is a species of hummingbird in the "mountain gems", tribe Lampornithini in subfamily Trochilinae. It is found from Mexico to Costa Rica.

== Taxonomy and systematics ==
The plain-capped starthroat has three subspecies, the nominate H. c. constantii, H. c. pinicola, and H. c. leocadiae.

== Description ==
The plain-capped starthroat is 11 to 13 cm (4.3 to 5.1 in) long. Males weigh about 7.4 g (0.26 oz) and females about 7.2 g (0.25 oz). Both sexes of all subspecies have a long, almost straight, black bill and a white streak behind the eye. The sexes have essentially the same plumage.

The nominate subspecies has metallic bronze green upperparts with a wide white streak on the rump; the crown is less metallic than the rest. Much of the face is dusky, with a wide white "moustache". The chin is sooty to blackish and the gorget ranges from several shades of bright metallic red to purplish red. The underparts are browish gray with a white belly. The undertail coverts are pale gray with wide white tips. The flanks have a large tuft of white feathers. The central pair of tail feathers are bronze green with dusky ends and the rest bronze green with much blackish at the ends and white edges on their inner margins. Immatures have a dark sooty brown throat with grayish white margins on the feathers.

Subspecies H. c. pinicola is similar to the nominate but has paler underparts and a smaller gorget. H. c. leocadiae's underparts are paler than the nominate's but darker than pinicola's and its gorget is more pink than red.

== Distribution and habitat ==
Subspecies H. c. pinicola is the northernmost; it is found in Mexico from Sonora south to Jalisco. H. c. leocadiae is found in southwestern Mexico and western Guatemala. The nominate H. c. constantii is found from El Salvador through Honduras and Nicaragua into northwestern Costa Rica. H. c. pinicola also strays to Arizona, where it was first recorded in 1969 and by 2022 was being seen almost annually.

The species inhabits a variety of arid to semiarid landscapes including the interior and edges of mature forest, thorn forest, scrublands, gallery forest, secondary forest, and open areas with scattered trees.

== Behavior ==
=== Movement ===
The plain-capped starthroat is a year-round resident in most of its range. In Sonora it appears to be mostly a breeding-season inhabitant but there are a few winter records as well. In Arizona almost all of the records are between May and October.

=== Feeding ===
The plain-capped starthroat feeds on nectar from a wide variety of flowering plants. It usually forages by trap-lining (visiting a circuit of flowers) but males sometimes defend flower patches. It forages at all heights from the understory to the forest canopy. In addition to nectar, it also feeds on small insects captured by hawking from an exposed perch and by gleaning from vegetation.

=== Breeding ===
Little is known about the plain-capped starthroat's breeding phenology. In western Mexico it breeds between January and June and in Costa Rica between October and January, but its breeding seasons elsewhere have not been documented. It makes a shallow cup nest of plant down with lichen on the outside and typically places it near the tip of a branch high in a tree.

=== Vocalization ===
The plain-capped starthroat's song is "a series of sharp chips interspersed with varied chips, chip chip chip pi-chip chip chip ...., or chi chi chi chi whit-it chi ...". Its calls include "a high-pitched, fairly soft and melodious slurred tseep or cheek", "a sharp, fairly loud peek", and during chases "a high pitched, piercing twitter".

== Status ==
The IUCN has assessed the plain-capped starthroat as being of Least Concern. It has a very large range and its population is estimated to be between 50,000 and 500,000 mature individuals. The population is, however, believed to be decreasing. No immediate threats have been identified. It ranges from uncommon to common in various parts of its range. "Human activity probably has little short term effect on [the] Plain-capped Starthroat".
