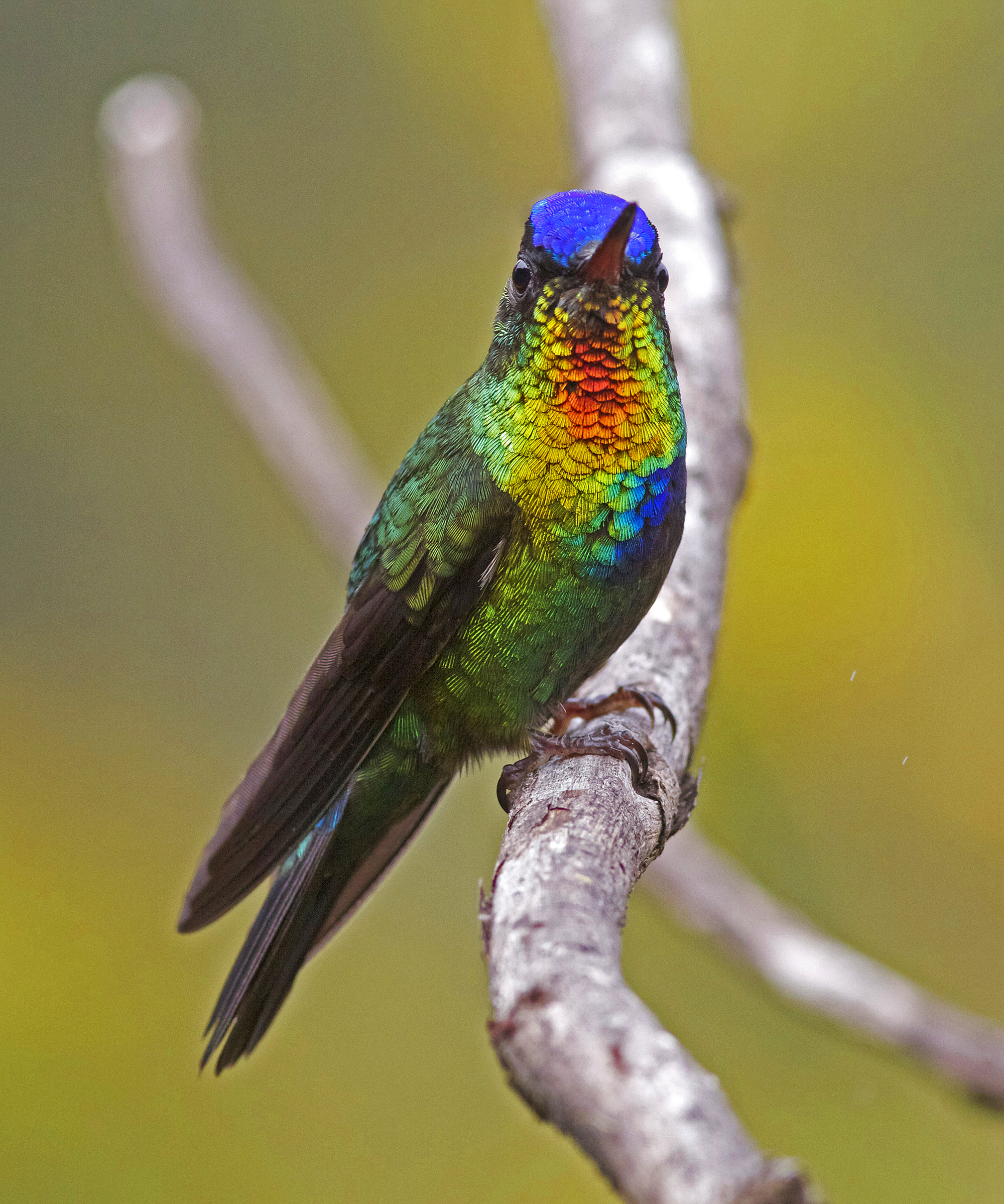
- Showing fiery throat in Paraiso del Quetzal, Costa Rica
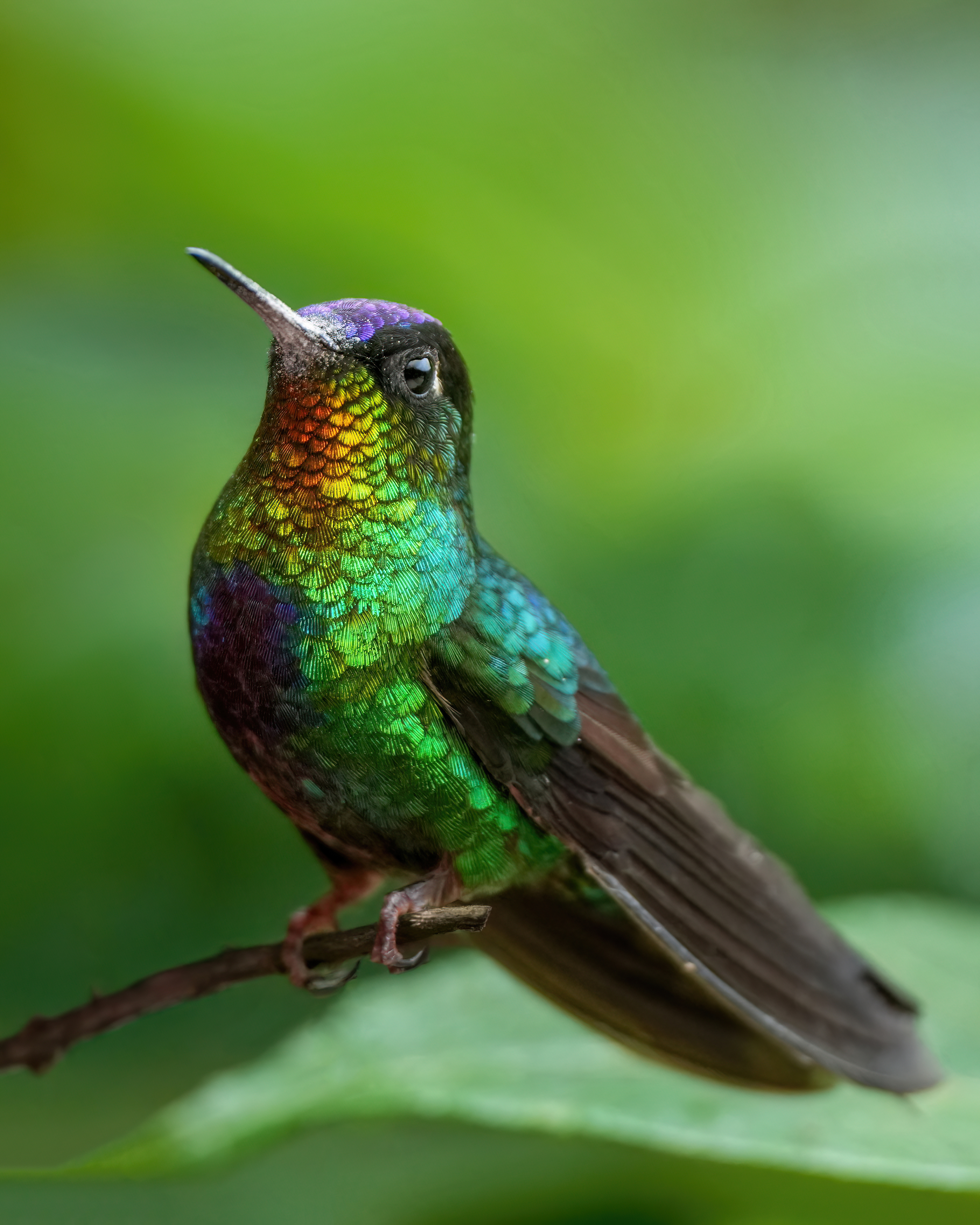
- Los Quetzales National Park, Costa Rica

Conservation status
- Least Concern (IUCN 3.1)
- CITES Appendix II

Scientific classification
- Kingdom: Animalia
- Phylum: Chordata
- Class: Aves
- Order: Apodiformes
- Family: Trochilidae
- Subfamily: Trochilinae
- Tribe: Lampornithini
- Genus: Panterpe; Cabanis & Heine, 1860
- Species: P. insignis

Binomial name
- Panterpe insignis Cabanis & Heine, 1860

= Fiery-throated hummingbird =

Species of bird

The fiery-throated hummingbird (Panterpe insignis) is a species of hummingbird in the "mountain gems" tribe Lampornithini in subfamily Trochilinae. It is found in Costa Rica and Panama.

== Taxonomy and systematics ==
The fiery-throated hummingbird is the only member of genus Panterpe. It has two subspecies, the nominate P. i. insignis and P. i. eisenmanni.

== Description ==
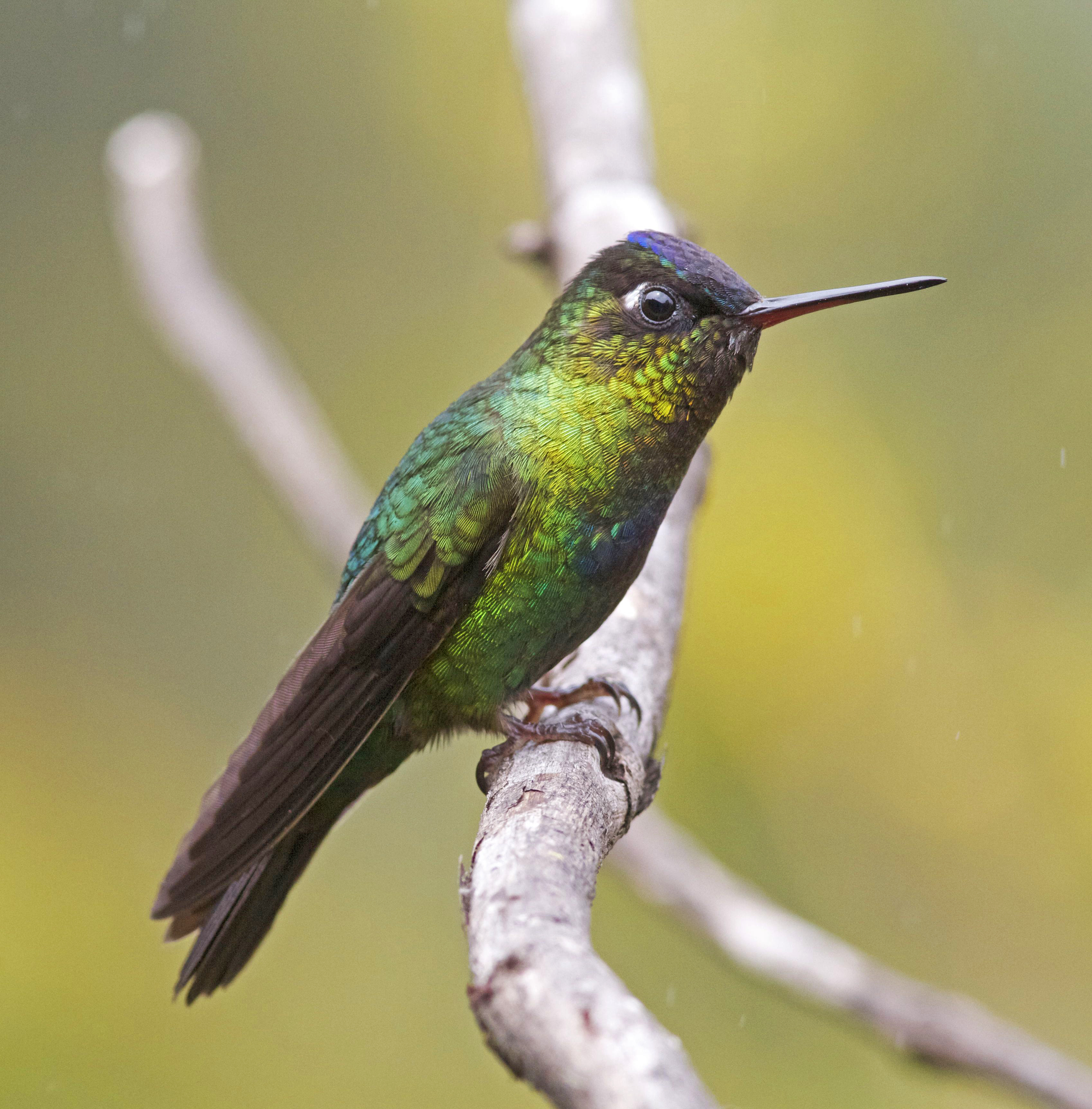
Very little color is apparent from the side.

The fiery-throated hummingbird is 10.5 to 11 cm (4.1 to 4.3 in) long. Males weigh 5.9 to 6.2 g (0.21 to 0.22 oz) and females 4.9 to 5.2 g (0.17 to 0.18 oz). Within each subspecies the male and female are alike. All have a mostly black bill with a pink base to the mandible and a small white spot behind the eye. The nominate P. i. insignis has a glittering royal blue crown and the rest of the face and nape are black. The back is bright metallic green that becomes bluish green on the uppertail coverts. The tail is blue-black. The center of the throat is brilliant rosy coppery orange and the sides are golden green. It has a violet-blue patch on the center of the breast and the rest of the underparts are bright green to blue-green. Subspecies P. i. eisenmanni is slightly smaller than the nominate but has a much shorter bill. The black of the neck extends onto the upper back and the blue-violet of the chest extends into the belly. The uppertail coverts are mostly blue.

== Distribution and habitat ==
The nominate subspecies of fiery-throated hummingbird is found from the Cordillera de Tilarán in north-central Costa Rica southeast to Bocas del Toro and Chiriquí provinces of far western Panama. P. i. eisenmanni is restricted to the Cordillera de Guanacaste in northwestern Costa Rica. The species inhabits a variety of wooded landscapes including montane forest, cloudforest and elfin forest. It also occurs in more open landscapes like the lower edge of páramo, secondary forest, and pastures with many trees. It mostly remains in the forest canopy but occurs in shrubs low down at the forest edge and in clearings. In northern and north-central Costa Rica it occurs at elevations from 1,600 m (5,250 ft) to summits at up to 2,000 m (6,560 ft); further south in higher mountains it ranges between 2,200 and 3,200 m (7,220 and 10,500 ft).

== Behavior ==
=== Movement ===
In at least parts of its range, the fiery-throated hummingbird moves to lower elevations after breeding, though rarely below 1,400 m (4,590 ft).

=== Feeding ===
The fiery-throated hummingbird feeds on nectar taken from a variety of small flowers, including those of epiphytic Ericaceae, bromeliads, shrubs, and small trees. At flowers too deep for its bill it will take nectar from holes made by itself, bumblebees, and flowerpiercers. The species is aggressive and dominant over most other hummingbirds. Males defend feeding territories during the breeding season but allow females to feed; both sexes defend territories post-breeding. In addition to nectar, the species captures small arthropods on the wing and sometimes by gleaning from foliage.

=== Breeding ===
The fiery-throated hummingbird's breeding season in Costa Rica spans from August to January. The female is entirely responsible for nest building and incubation. She lays two white eggs in a bulky cup nest of plant fibers whose outside is covered with moss and lichen. The nest is typically placed 2 to 4 m (7 to 10 ft) high at the end of a descending bamboo stem or on a rootlet under a bank. The incubation length and time to fledging have not been documented.

=== Vocalization ===
The fiery-throated hummingbird does not appear to have a true song. One call is "a repeated nasal, squeaky 'kek...kek...', given in [a] fast series". Another is "a complex fast liquid twittering with sudden squeaky rises in pitch".

== Status ==
The IUCN has assessed the fiery-throated hummingbird as being of Least Concern. Though it has a small range, its population is estimated to be between 50,000 and 500,000 mature individuals and the number is believed to be stable. Much of its range is protected in preserves and national parks, and it is considered common to abundant throughout.
