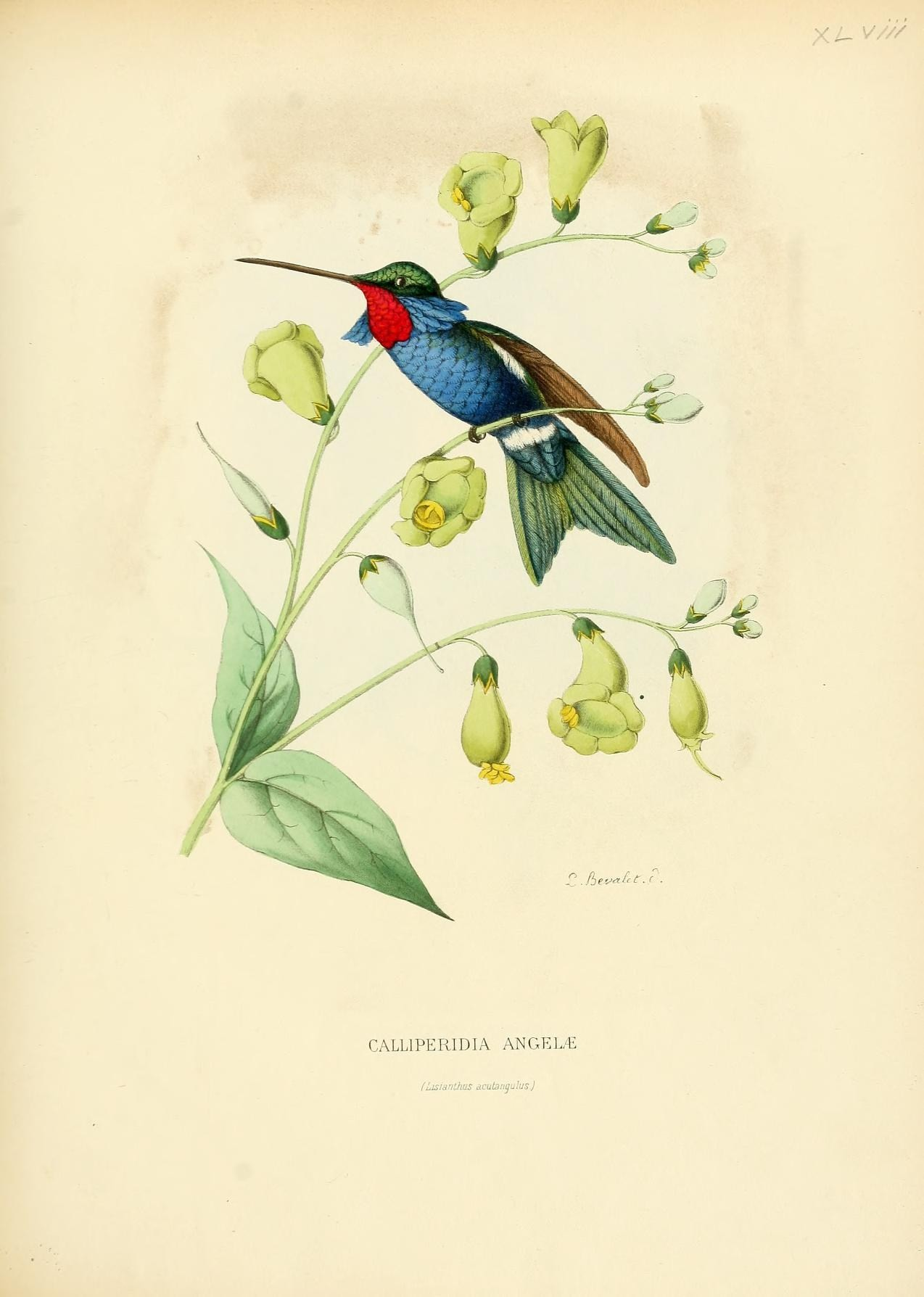

Conservation status
- Least Concern (IUCN 3.1)
- CITES Appendix II

Scientific classification
- Kingdom: Animalia
- Phylum: Chordata
- Class: Aves
- Order: Apodiformes
- Family: Trochilidae
- Genus: Heliomaster
- Species: H. furcifer

Binomial name
- Heliomaster furcifer (Shaw, 1812)

= Blue-tufted starthroat =

Species of hummingbird

The blue-tufted starthroat (Heliomaster furcifer) is a species of hummingbird in the "mountain gems", tribe Lampornithini in subfamily Trochilinae. It is found in Argentina, Bolivia, Brazil, Colombia, Paraguay, Peru, Uruguay and possibly Ecuador.

== Taxonomy and systematics ==
At one time the blue-tufted starthroat was the only species in genus Heliomaster, but since the mid-1900s three other species have been reassigned to it. The blue-tufted starthroat is monotypic.

== Description ==
The blue-tufted starthroat is 12.6 to 13 cm (5.0 to 5.1 in) long and weighs 5 to 6.5 g (0.18 to 0.23 oz). Both sexes of all subspecies have a long, decurved, black bill and a small white spot behind the eye. Both have a forked tail but the female's is less deeply indented than the male's. Males in breeding plumage have an emerald green crown, nape, and upper back; the rest of the upperparts are shining coppery green. The throat is glittering violet. The underparts and elongated feathers on the sides of the neck are iridescent ultramarine. The tail is dark green on its upper side and blue-green below. Non-breeding males are grayish below like females. Females have coppery green upperparts. The throat and underparts are gray, with a white line down the middle of the belly and green spots on the flanks. The tail is bronze green above with black tips on the central feathers; it is shining blue-green below with white tips on the outer feathers.

== Distribution and habitat ==
The core of the blue-tufted starthroat's range is eastern Bolivia, southern Brazil, Paraguay, northern Argentina, and northern Uruguay. It has also been documented in Colombia and Peru and has one undocumented sight record in Ecuador. It inhabits open landscapes such as forest edges, cerrado, and grasslands.

== Behavior ==
=== Movement ===
The blue-tufted starthroat's movement pattern is poorly known. The records out of its core range and some at the edges of it might indicate some post-breeding migration or dispersal.

=== Feeding ===
The blue-tufted starthroat feeds on nectar from a wide variety of flowering plants. It is one of the major pollinators of Dolichandra cynanchoides, a flowering vine. It typically forages between 2 and 8 m (7 and 30 ft) above the ground. Males defend flower patches. In addition to nectar, it also feeds on small insects captured by hawking.

=== Breeding ===
The blue-tufted starthroat's breeding season spans from November to March. It makes a cup nest of soft fibers covered with lichen, typically sited 3 to 6 m (10 to 20 ft) above the ground. The female incubates the clutch of two eggs for 15 to 16 days and fledging occurs 20 to 25 days after hatch.

=== Vocalization ===
The blue-tufted starthroat does not appear to have a conventional song. It does make "a descending, pure-whistled 'tseep'" call.

== Status ==
The IUCN has assessed the blue-tufted starthroat as being of Least Concern, though its population size is unknown and believed to be decreasing. No immediate threats have been identified. It is considered rare to locally common at various parts of its large range and occurs in some protected areas.
