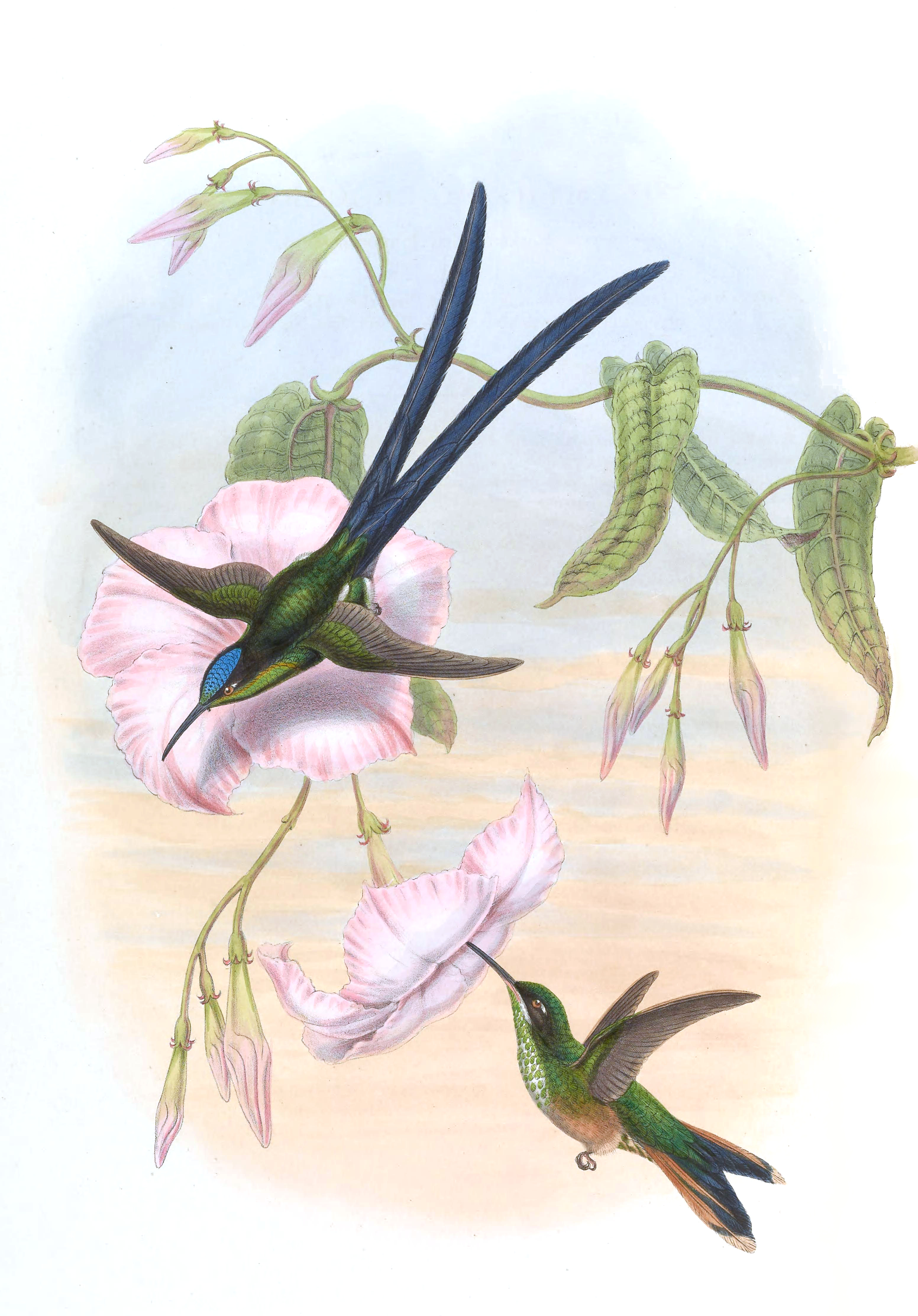

Conservation status
- Endangered (IUCN 3.1)
- CITES Appendix II

Scientific classification
- Kingdom: Animalia
- Phylum: Chordata
- Class: Aves
- Order: Apodiformes
- Family: Trochilidae
- Subfamily: Trochilinae
- Tribe: Lampornithini
- Genus: Hylonympha; Gould, 1873
- Species: H. macrocerca

Binomial name
- Hylonympha macrocerca Gould, 1873

= Scissor-tailed hummingbird =

Species of bird

The scissor-tailed hummingbird (Hylonympha macrocerca) is an Endangered species of hummingbird in the "mountain gems", tribe Lampornithini in subfamily Trochilinae. It is endemic to Venezuela.

== Taxonomy and systematics ==
The scissor-tailed hummingbird is the only member of its genus and has no subspecies. A proposal in the early 21st century to move it into genus Eugenes was not adopted by major worldwide taxonomic systems.

== Description ==
The scissor-tailed hummingbird male is about 19 cm (7.5 in) long including its 9 to 10 cm (3.5 to 3.9 in) tail and weighs 7 to 7.5 g (0.25 to 0.26 oz). Females are 12 to 13 cm (4.7 to 5.1 in) long and weigh 6.5 to 8 g (0.23 to 0.28 oz). Both sexes have a long slightly decurved black bill.

Males have a glittering violet forehead and center of the crown; the rest of the crown is a very dark green that is almost black. Their back is metallic grass green with a golden wash on the neck. The throat and breast are glittering emerald green and the rest of the underparts a duller and darker green that becomes blackish on the belly. The flanks have green spots. The blackish purple tail's outermost feathers are much longer and broader than the others.

Females are dark glittering green above including the forehead and crown. Their throat and breast are white, spotted with green except in the center of the breast. The belly and undertail coverts are rufous chestnut. The tail is forked but not nearly as dramatically as the male's. Its central feathers are green at the base and steel blue at the end. The outer feathers are cinnamon with beige tips.

== Distribution and habitat ==
The scissor-tailed hummingbird is found only on the Paria Peninsula of northeastern Venezuela. It primarily inhabits the interior of damp mature subtropical forest and cloudforest, and is also found at forest edges and in small clearings. In elevation it ranges from 500 to 1,200 m (1,600 to 3,900 ft).

== Behavior ==
=== Movement ===
The scissor-tailed hummingbird is sedentary.

=== Feeding ===
The scissor-tailed hummingbird feeds on nectar, mainly from flowering bromeliads but also from flowers of genera Heliconia and Costus. Females might defend feeding territories. In addition to nectar, the species feeds on arthropods by gleaning from vegetation and by hawking from a perch.

=== Breeding ===
Nothing is known about the scissor-tailed hummingbird's breeding phenology.

=== Vocalization ===
What is thought to be the scissor-tailed hummingbird's song is "a short, pulsating burst...'tsi-si-sip...tsi-si-sip...tsi-si-sip....' or 'tsi-sip...tsi-sip...tsi-sip...'".

== Status ==
The IUCN originally assessed the violet-tailed hummingbird as Threatened, then successively as Critically Endangered in 1994 and Vulnerable in 2000. Since 2012 it has been classed as Endangered. It has a very small range in which its forest habitat is undergoing continued clearing for agriculture. Its population is estimated at between 3000 and 4000 mature individuals and is believed to be declining. It appears to be dependent on undisturbed cloudforest, and though part of its range is within Península de Paria National Park, much is outside it and the park itself is minimally protected.
