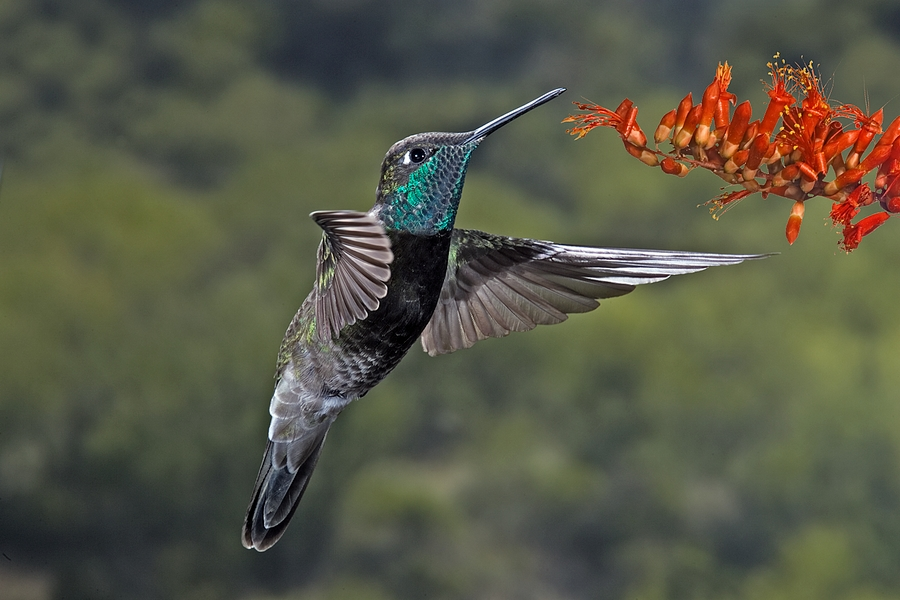
- Male
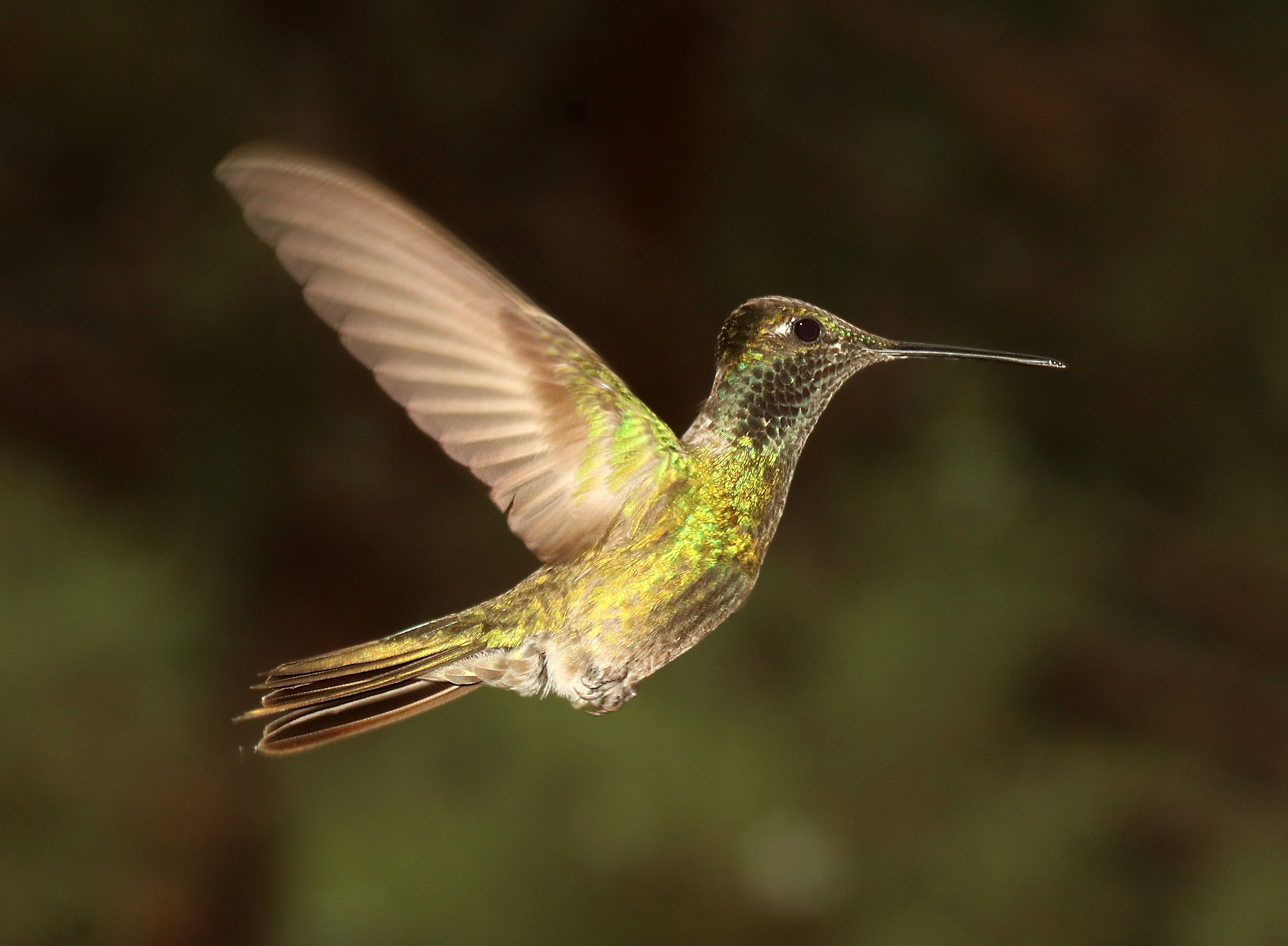
- Female

Conservation status
- Least Concern (IUCN 3.1)
- CITES Appendix II

Scientific classification
- Kingdom: Animalia
- Phylum: Chordata
- Class: Aves
- Clade: Strisores
- Order: Apodiformes
- Family: Trochilidae
- Genus: Eugenes
- Species: E. fulgens

Binomial name
- Eugenes fulgens (Swainson, 1827)

= Rivoli's hummingbird =

Species of hummingbird

Rivoli's hummingbird (Eugenes fulgens), also known as the magnificent hummingbird, is a species of hummingbird in the "mountain gems", tribe Lampornithini in subfamily Trochilinae. It is found in El Salvador, Guatemala, Honduras, Mexico, Nicaragua, and the United States.

== Taxonomy and systematics ==
Eugenes fulgens was originally described as the magnificent hummingbird, and by the late 1800s was treated as having two subspecies. Beginning in 2017 the North American Classification Committee of the American Ornithological Society (NACC), the International Ornithological Committee (IOC), and the Clements taxonomy split them into the current Rivoli's hummingbird and the Talamanca hummingbird (E. spectabilis). However, as of 2020, BirdLife International's Handbook of the Birds of the World (HBW) retains the single species "magnificent" hummingbird treatment.

Rivoli's hummingbird is monotypic.

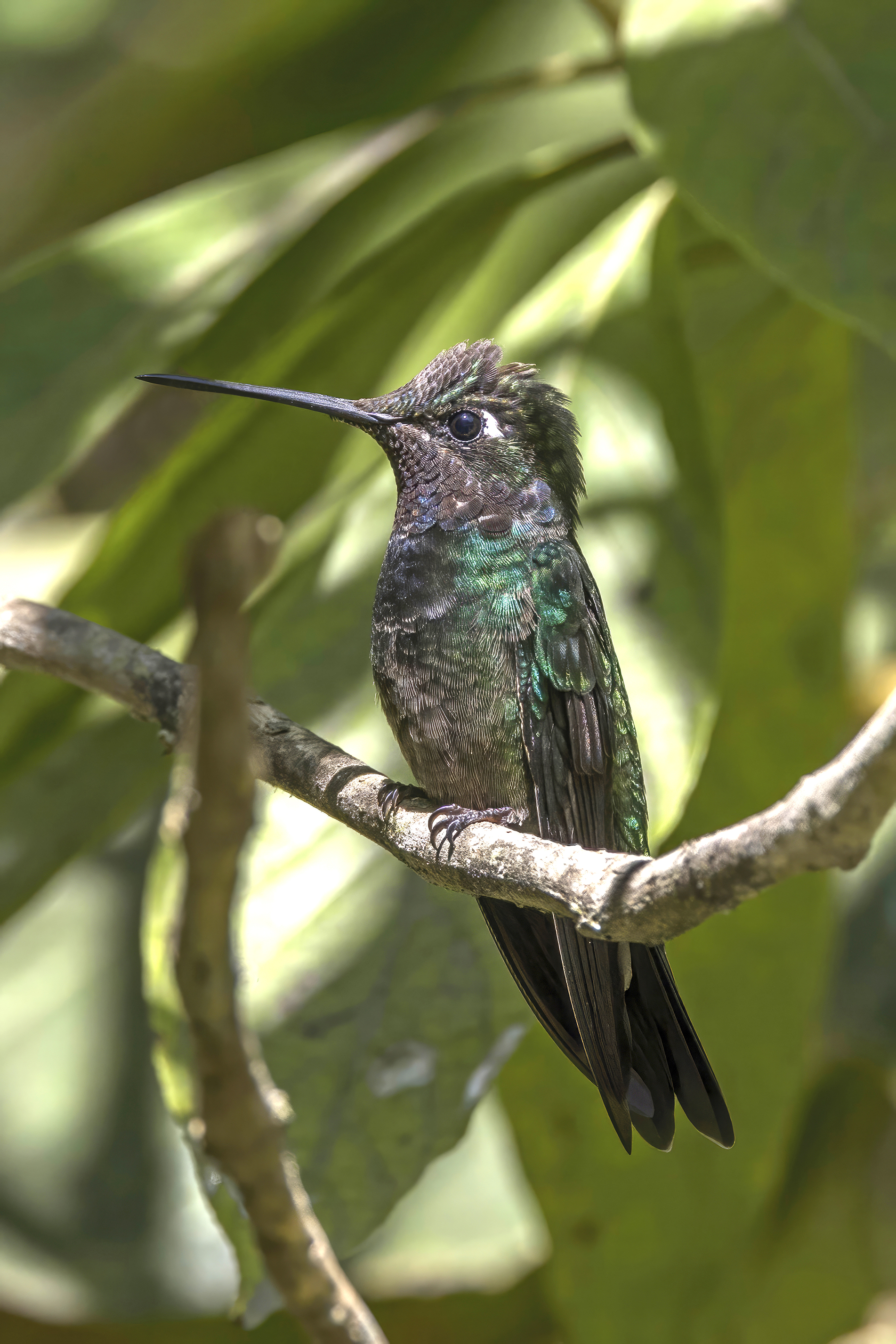
male

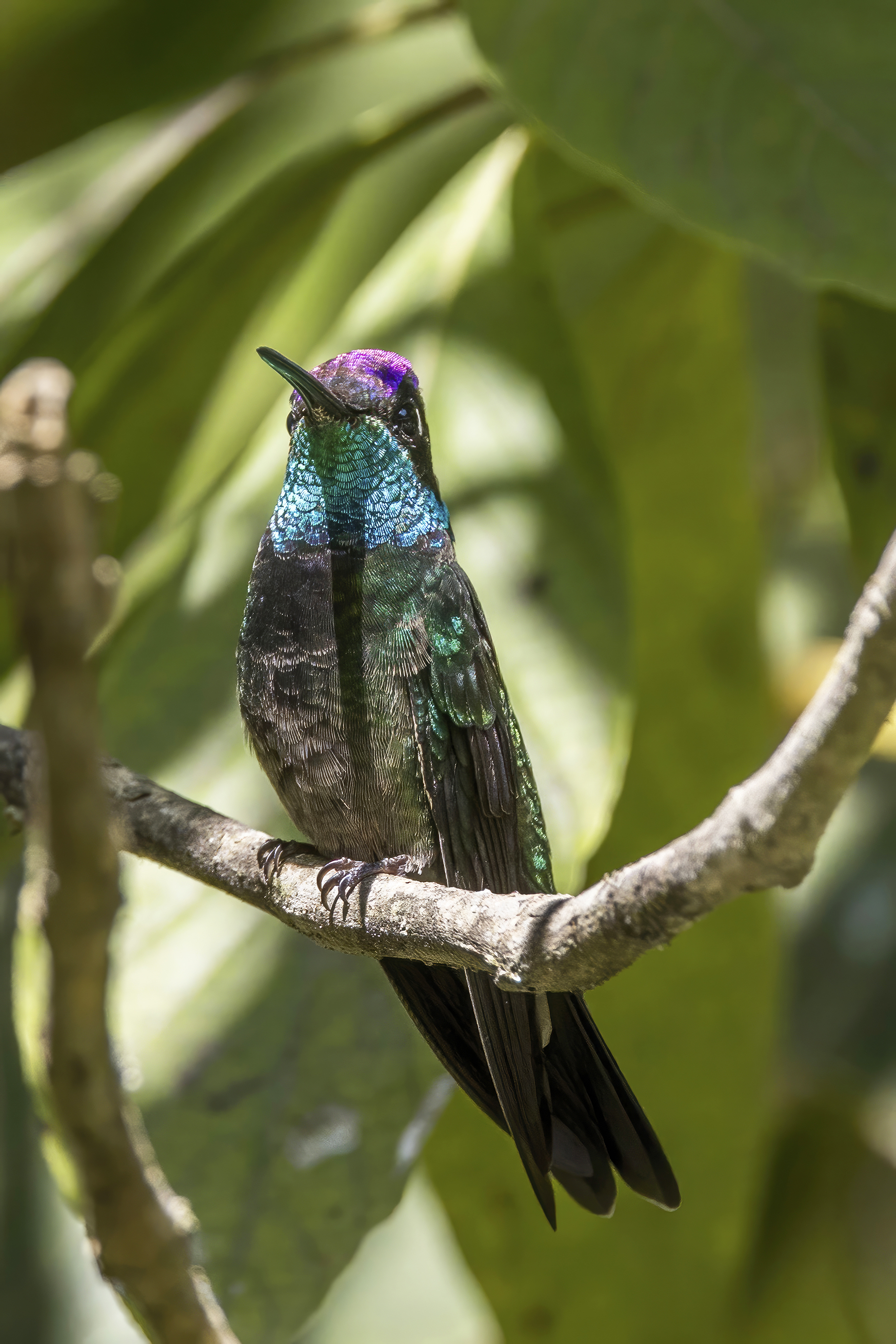
male, showing purple head and chest feathers

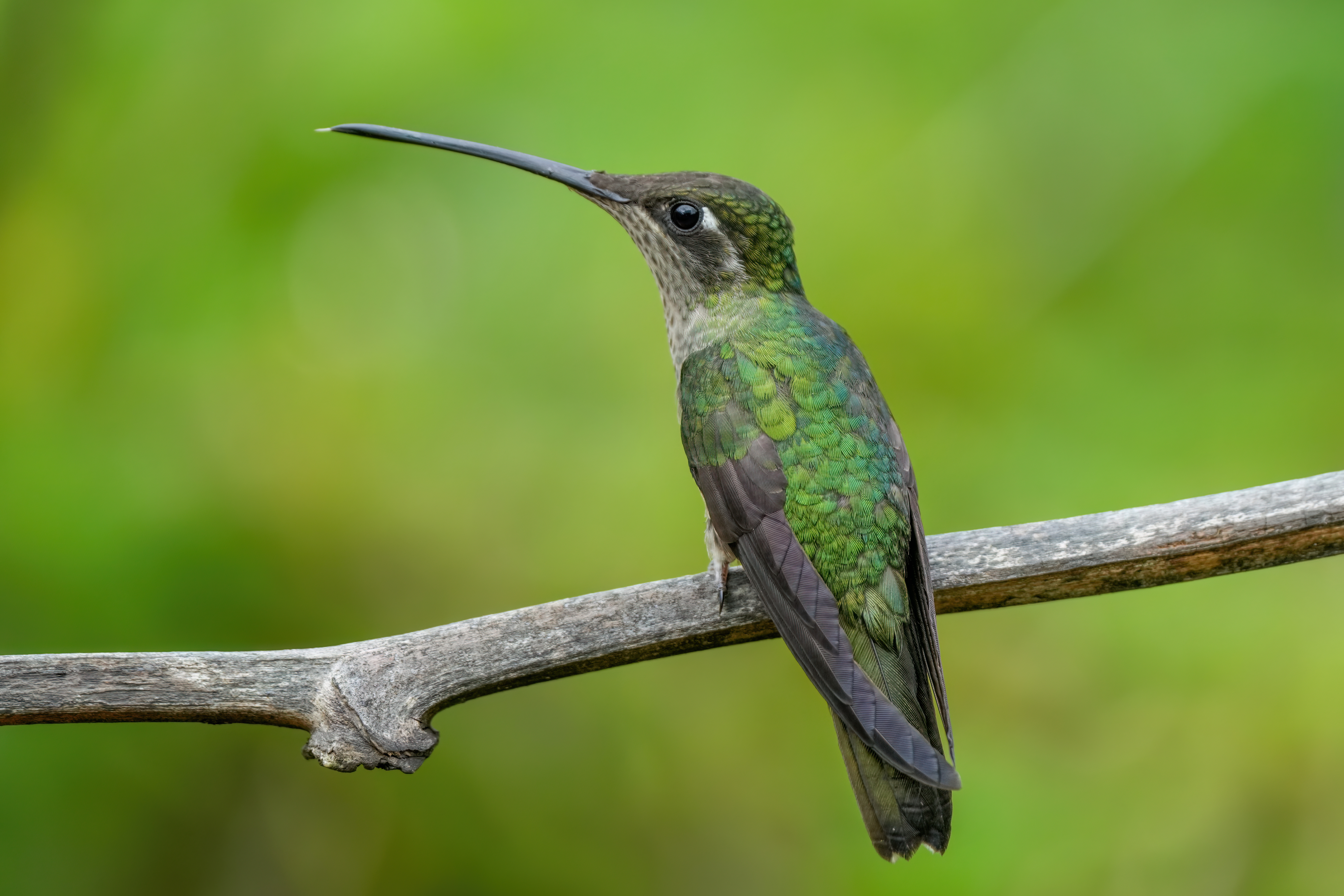
female, lateral view

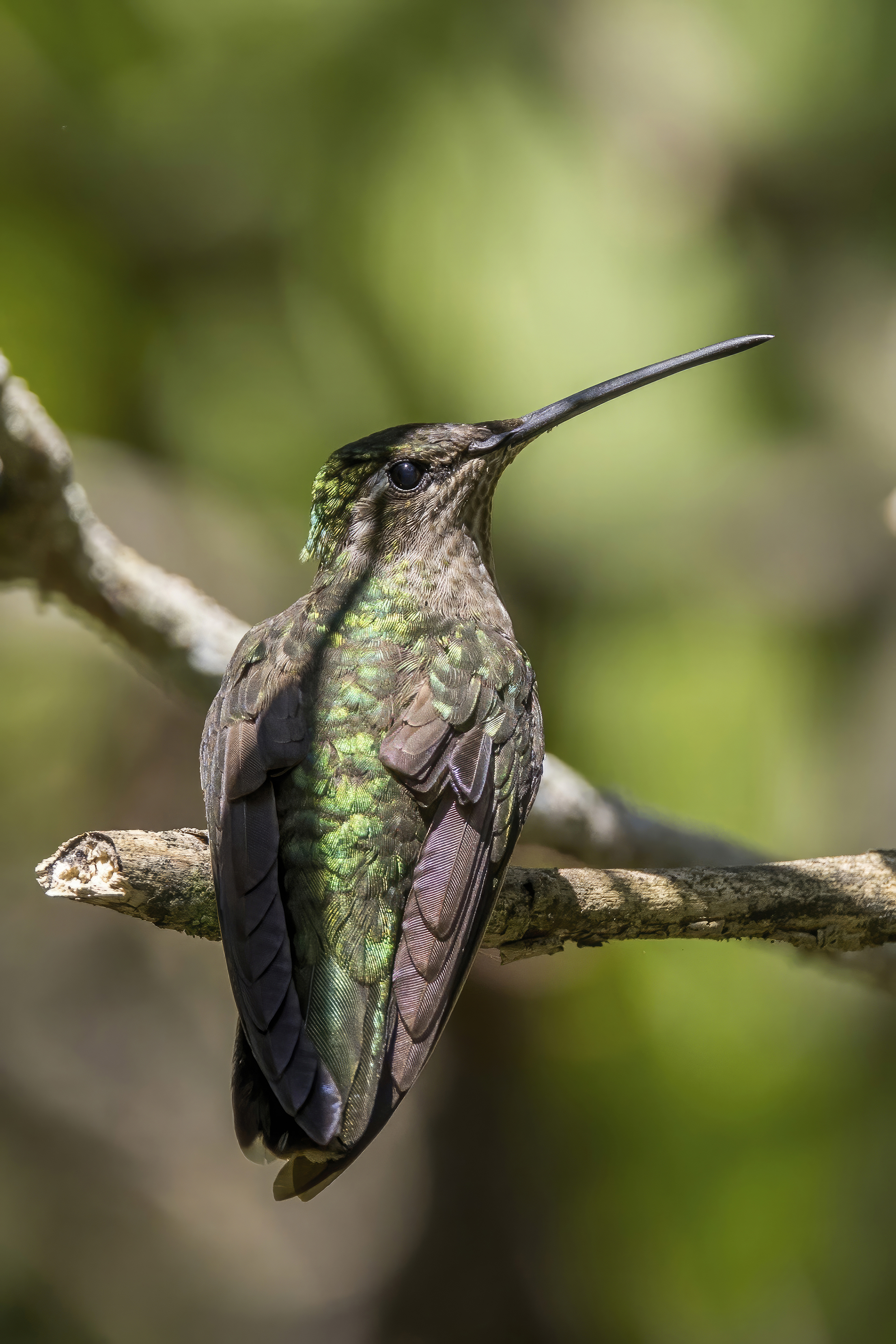
female, rear view

== Description ==
Rivoli's hummingbird is about 11 to 14 cm (4.3 to 5.5 in) long and weighs about 6 to 10 g (0.21 to 0.35 oz), with males typically a little larger than females. It has a wingspan of 18 centimetres (7.1 in). Of the hummingbirds found in the United States, Rivoli's hummingbird is one of the two largest species, rivaled in size only by the blue-throated hummingbird. The black bill is long and straight to slightly decurved. Both sexes look very dark unless the sun catches the iridescence of the plumage and the brilliant colors flash in the sunlight. During much of the year the species is in the "definitive basic" breeding plumage described below. It has a protracted molt between that plumage and the duller non-breeding appearance. There are some minor clinal variations in bill length and the color of the vent area.

The adult male is green-bronze dorsally, becoming more bronzed on the black-tipped tail. The crown is violet, the throat gorget bright blue-green, and the rest of the head black apart from a white spot behind the eye. The chest is green-bronze and the belly grayish. The female is bronze-green dorsally and has a dull gray ventral coloring. There is a white stripe behind her eye. Immature birds are like the female, but darker and browner.

== Distribution and habitat ==
Rivoli's hummingbird breeds in mountains from the southwestern United States to Honduras and Nicaragua. It inhabits the interior, edges, and clearings of pine-oak forest and cloudforest from about 1,500 m (4,900 ft) up to the timberline as well as more open secondary forest and some grasslands. It regularly comes to bird feeders.

== Behavior ==
=== Movement ===
Rivoli's hummingbird is migratory in part of its range. It is a year-round resident from north-central Mexico south to northern Nicaragua. It nests but does not overwinter in southeastern Arizona, possibly in southwestern New Mexico, and the Mexican states of Chihuahua, Sonora, and possibly others. There are summer records in the Chisos Mountains of Texas but breeding has not been confirmed there.

=== Interspecific interaction ===
Throughout its range Rivoli's hummingbird is subordinate to the larger blue-throated hummingbird. Rivoli's coexists with many other hummingbird species including black-chinned (Archilocus alexandri) and broad-tailed (Selasphorus platycercus). In Mexico they tend to dominate smaller hummingbirds such as amethyst-throated (Lampornis amethystinus), berylline (Saucerottia beryllina), and bumblebee (Atthis heloisa).

=== Feeding ===
Rivoli's hummingbird feeds on nectar from a wide variety of flowering plants whose composition varies by season, elevation, and latitude. In parts of Mexico at least, males defend feeding territories. It also feeds on small insects, which apparently make a larger part of its diet than the diets of other North American hummingbirds. It captures them in mid-air or by gleaning from vegetation while hovering.

=== Breeding ===
The Rivoli's hummingbird breeding season spans from May to July in the U.S. and is possibly year-round in El Salvador. It has not been defined elsewhere. It builds an open cup nest of soft feathers and moss bound with spider silk and covered with lichen. The cup's interior is about 1.9 to 3.2 cm (0.75 to 1.3 in) deep and 2.9 to 3.8 cm (1.1 to 1.5 in) wide. They are typically placed on a horizontal branch or in a fork, often in maples and sycamores, and often over streams. They are usually at least 6 m (20 ft) above the ground. The female alone incubates the clutch of two white eggs; the period is not known but is probably 15 to 19 days like that of many other hummingbirds. The time to fledging appears to be about 25 days.

=== Vocalization ===
What might be Rivoli's hummingbird song is "a loud or high-pitched, sharp tchik or tcheep." Another possible song is "a short chatter of notes that rise and fall". Males give single or a string of chip notes both while perched and in flight. During aggressive actions or alarm, the species gives a very rapid sequence of chip notes.

== Status ==
The IUCN follows HBW taxonomy and so treats Rivoli's and Talamanca hummingbirds as a single species assessed as being of Least Concern. As a whole it has a large range and an apparently stable population, though the population size is not known. Forest fires are a potential threat in the U.S. because Rivoli's is found only in higher isolated mountain ranges. "Habitat destruction in southern Mexico and Central America may have a longer-lasting impact on populations".
