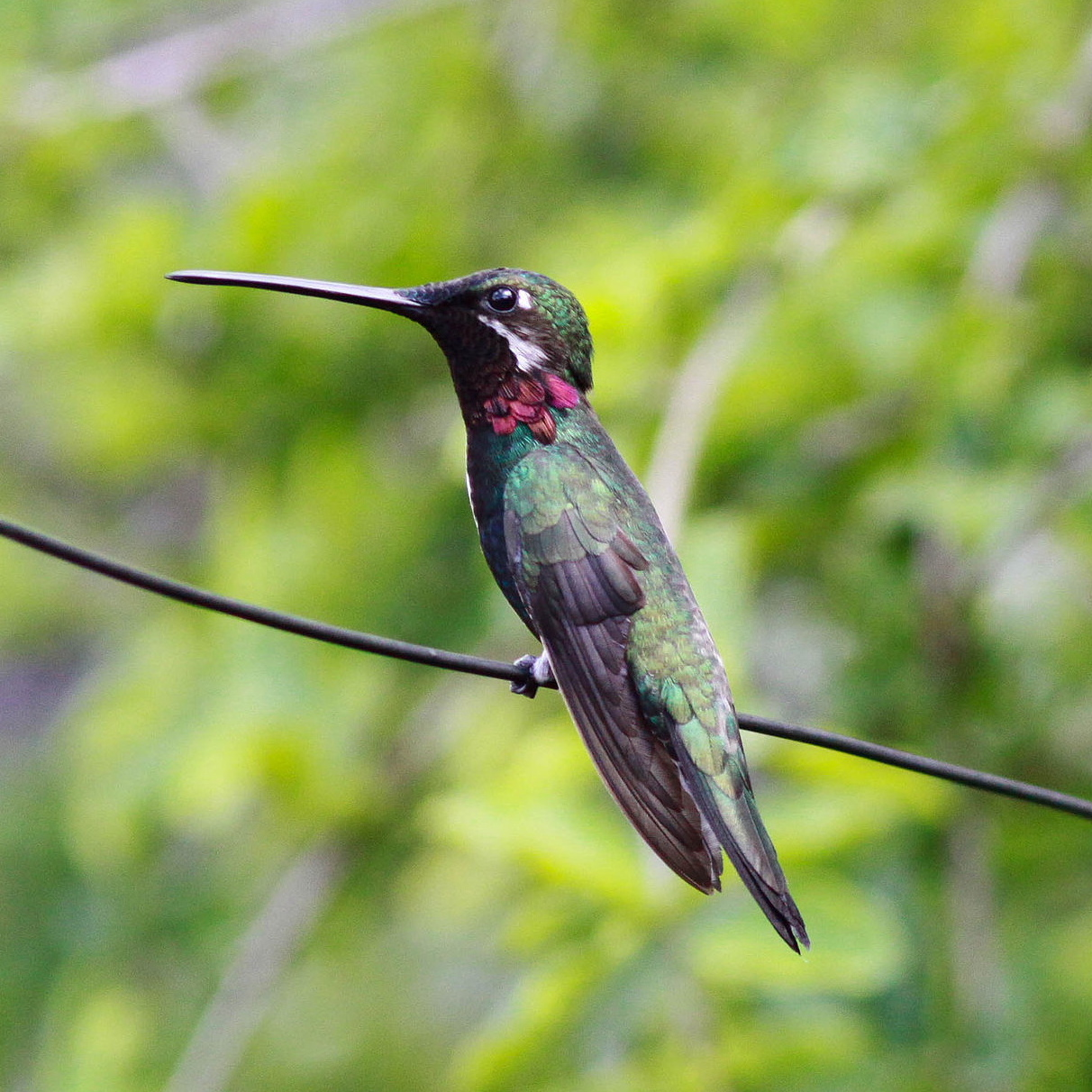
- SE Brazil (male)
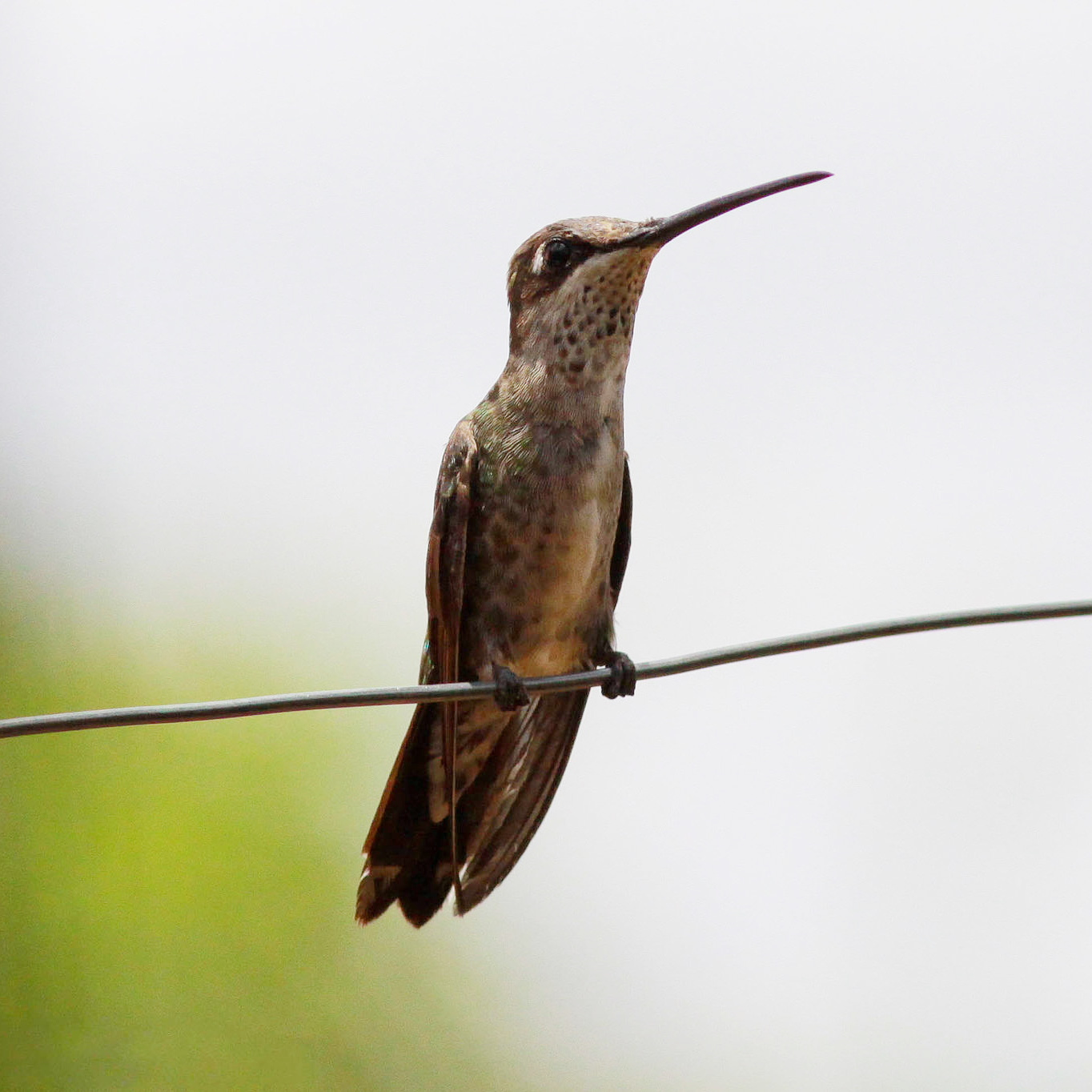
- SE Brazil (female)

Conservation status
- Least Concern (IUCN 3.1)
- CITES Appendix II

Scientific classification
- Kingdom: Animalia
- Phylum: Chordata
- Class: Aves
- Order: Apodiformes
- Family: Trochilidae
- Genus: Heliomaster
- Species: H. squamosus

Binomial name
- Heliomaster squamosus (Temminck, 1823)

= Stripe-breasted starthroat =

Species of hummingbird

The stripe-breasted starthroat (Heliomaster squamosus) is a species of hummingbird in the "mountain gems", tribe Lampornithini in subfamily Trochilinae. It is endemic to Brazil.

== Taxonomy and systematics ==
At one time the stripe-breasted starthroat was placed in genus Lepidolarynx but since the mid-1900s has had its current placement in Heliomaster. It is monotypic.

== Description ==
The stripe-breasted starthroat is 11.2 to 12.4 cm (4.4 to 4.9 in) long and weighs 5 to 6.5 g (0.18 to 0.23 oz). Both sexes have a long, slightly decurved, black bill, a white streak behind the eye, and a white "moustache". Both have a forked tail but the female's is less deeply indented than the male's. Males in breeding plumage have bronzy green upperparts with an iridescent green crown. Their gorget is glittering violet and the sides of it flare out. Their underparts are greenish-black with a white stripe down the middle. The central tail feathers are black and the rest are dark blue-green. After breeding its throat molts to grayish with black spots. Females' upperparts are like the male's. The throat feathers are blackish green with white edges. The chest and belly are grayish with a white stripe down the middle and the flanks are greenish. The tail is green and the outer feathers have a steel blue band near the end and white tips.

== Distribution and habitat ==
The stripe-breasted starthroat is found in eastern Brazil from Pernambuco south to São Paulo state. It has also been recorded as a vagrant in Argentina's Iguazú National Park. It inhabits forest and savannah at elevations from sea level to 800 m (2,600 ft).

== Behavior ==
=== Movement ===
The stripe-breasted starthroat is essentially sedentary but may occasionally wander to higher elevations than usual.

=== Feeding ===
The stripe-breasted starthroat feeds on nectar from a wide variety of flowering plants. It typically forages between 3 and 8 m (10 and 30 ft) above the ground. It is territorial, but defends flower patches from others of its species more than from other hummingbirds. In addition to nectar, it also feeds on small insects captured by hawking.

=== Breeding ===
The stripe-breasted starthroat's breeding season is usually February to April but it has been recorded incubating in November. It makes a small cup nest and usually sites it on a horizontal tree branch 6 to 8 m (20 to 30 ft) above the ground. Some nests have been seen higher, and at least one has been seen on a utility wire. The female incubates the clutch of two eggs for 14 to 16 days and fledging occurs 21 to 24 days after hatch.

=== Vocalization ===
What is thought to be the stripe-breasted starthroat's song is "a subdued, buzzy scratchy warble 'bzzzrrrr..bzzzrrr..chi-chi-chi-chi..bzrrr'." It also makes "a liquid 'tsik'" call.

== Status ==
The IUCN originally assessed the stripe-breasted starthroat as Near Threatened but since 2004 has rated it as being of Least Concern. Though its population size is unknown, it is believed to be stable. It is considered to be locally common and occurs in at least one Brazilian national park.
