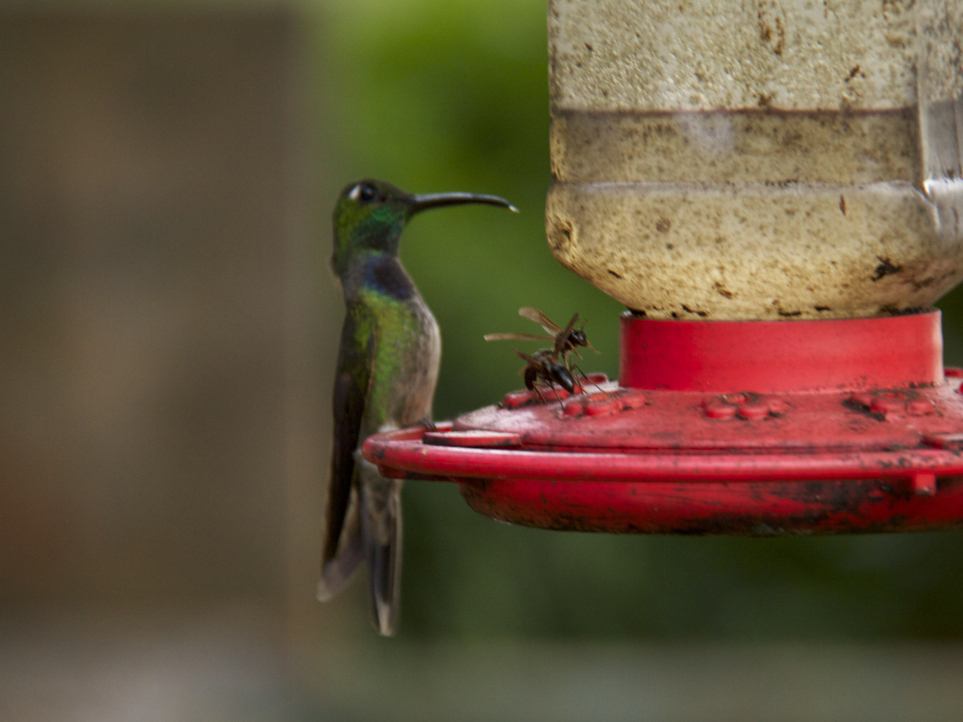
- male

Conservation status
- Least Concern (IUCN 3.1)
- CITES Appendix II

Scientific classification
- Kingdom: Animalia
- Phylum: Chordata
- Class: Aves
- Order: Apodiformes
- Family: Trochilidae
- Tribe: Lampornithini
- Genus: Sternoclyta; Gould, 1858
- Species: S. cyanopectus

Binomial name
- Sternoclyta cyanopectus (Gould, 1846)

= Violet-chested hummingbird =

Species of hummingbird

The violet-chested hummingbird (Sternoclyta cyanopectus) is a species of hummingbird in the "mountain gems", tribe Lampornithini in subfamily Trochilinae. It is found in Colombia and Venezuela.

== Taxonomy and systematics ==
The violet-chested hummingbird is the only member of its genus and has no subspecies. A proposal in the early 21st century to move it into genus Eugenes was not adopted by major worldwide taxonomic systems.

== Description ==
The violet-chested hummingbird is 11.4 to 13 cm (4.5 to 5.1 in) long. Males weigh 7 to 9.4 g (0.25 to 0.33 oz) and females 4.0 to 10.3 g (0.14 to 0.36 oz). Both sexes have a decurved black bill, with the male's being longer, and a small white spot behind the eye. Adult males have shining grass green upperparts. Their gorget is glittering emerald green with a patch of glittering violet blue below it on the breast. The rest of the underparts are grayish buff with golden-green spots on the flanks. The tail is bronze with small white tips on the outer feathers. Adult females are also shining grass green above. Their underparts are mostly grayish with green spots on the chest; the center of the belly is rufescent. Young juveniles resemble the adult female.

== Distribution and habitat ==
The largest part of the violet-chested hummingbird's range is in northern and western Venezuela. It is found in the Coastal Range as far east as Miranda state and from there southwest in the Andes of Lara, Mérida, and Táchira states and slightly into Colombia's Norte de Santander Department. It primarily inhabits humid subtropical forest and woodlands and is partial to openings created by landslides and treefall. It also occurs in mature secondary forest and coffee plantations. In elevation it ranges from sea level to 2,000 m (6,600 ft) though it is seldom found below 700 m (2,300 ft).

== Behavior ==
=== Movement ===
The violet-chested hummingbird is sedentary.

=== Feeding ===
The violet-chested hummingbird usually forages for nectar deep in the forest, typically in dense understory and often in damp ravines and Heliconia thickets. It defends flower patches and never gathers with other hummingbirds at large flowering events.

=== Breeding ===
The violet-chested hummingbird's breeding season spans from March to July in Lara state and also in November and December in other parts of its range. It builds a cup nest, usually in a branch fork but sometimes on a vine or fern, and typically about 2 m (7 ft) above the ground. The nest is made of soft plant fibers with an outer layer of moss, tree fern scales, and lichen. The female incubates the clutch of two eggs for an average of about 20 days and fledging occurs about 26 days after hatch.

=== Vocalization ===
The violet-chested hummingbird's primary song is a "series of sharp 'chit! ... chit! ... chit!...' notes". Another song is "'chip' and 'weet' notes together with short, squeaky trills". While foraging it makes "loud, staccato chipping notes".

== Status ==
The IUCN has assessed the violet-chested hummingbird as being of Least Concern. However, it has a restricted range and its population size and trend are unknown. No immediate threats have been identified. It occurs in some protected areas. It is considered "[l]ocally common [and] seems readily to accept second growth and man-made habitats.
