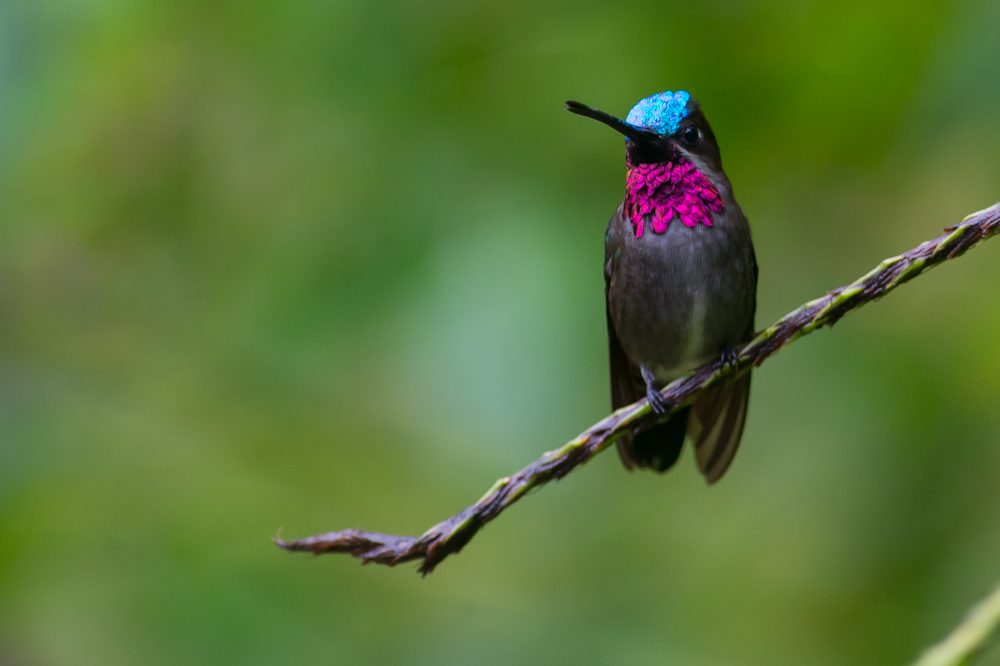

Conservation status
- Least Concern (IUCN 3.1)
- CITES Appendix II (CITES)

Scientific classification
- Kingdom: Animalia
- Phylum: Chordata
- Class: Aves
- Clade: Strisores
- Order: Apodiformes
- Family: Trochilidae
- Genus: Heliomaster
- Species: H. longirostris

Binomial name
- Heliomaster longirostris (Audebert & Vieillot, 1801)
- Distribution

= Long-billed starthroat =

Species of hummingbird

The long-billed starthroat (Heliomaster longirostris) is a species of hummingbird in the "mountain gems", tribe Lampornithini in subfamily Trochilinae. It is found in Mexico, Central America, Trinidad, and all but the four southernmost countries of South America.

== Taxonomy and systematics ==
At one time the long-billed starthroat was placed in genus Anthoscenus but since the mid-1900s has had its current placement in Heliomaster. It has three subspecies, the nominate H. l. longirostris, H. l. pallidicepts, and H. l. albicrissa.

== Description ==
The long-billed starthroat is 11 to 12 cm (4.3 to 4.7 in) long. Males weigh 5.5 to 7.1 g (0.19 to 0.25 oz) and females about 6.5 g (0.23 oz). Both sexes of all subspecies have a long, almost straight, black bill and a small white spot behind the eye.

Males of the nominate subspecies have a glittering blue to greenish blue crown; the rest of its upperparts are dark bronzy green with the exception of a white stripe down the center of the rump. The face is black below the crown and has a white malar stripe below the black. Its tail is rather short and square-tipped. The feathers are bronzy green near the body and black away from it, and the outer two or three pairs have white tips. The chin is black, the gorget dark metallic purple, the breast gray with bronzy green sides, and the lower breast and belly dull white. The undertail coverts are gray with white edges. Nominate females are very similar but the blue of the crown is much reduced or absent and the gorget is narrower and dusky gray.

Subspecies H. l. pallidicepts has a more greenish blue crown than the nominate and the sides of the breast are golden bronze. H. l. albicrissa is identical to the nominate except that its undertail coverts are mostly to entirely white.

== Distribution and habitat ==
Subspecies H. l. pallidicepts of long-billed starthroat is the northernmost; it is found from southern Mexico through Belize, Guatemala, Honduras, and El Salvador into Nicaragua. The nominate H. l. longirostris is the most widespread. It is found from Costa Rica through Panama, into South America as far south as eastern Peru and eastern Bolivia and east through the Guianas well into Brazil, and on Trinidad. H. l. albicrissa has a restricted range in western Ecuador and northwestern Peru. The species inhabits a variety of humid semi-open landscapes including the edges of woodland, isolated woodlands, pastures with trees, gallery forest, and secondary forest. It shuns the interior of closed forest. It is a bird of the lowlands and foothills that ranges in elevation from sea level to about 1,500 m (4,900 ft).

== Behavior ==
=== Movement ===
The long-billed starthroat has erratic and poorly understood movements. It seems to move in response to the flowering of different plant communities.

=== Feeding ===
The long-billed starthroat feeds on nectar, especially at the flowers of large trees but also those of vines, shrubs, and Heliconia. It forages both by trap-lining (visiting a circuit of flowering plants) and by defending flower-laden trees. It also feeds on small insects, often capturing them on the wing high in the air and sometimes by gleaning from vegetation.

=== Breeding ===
The long-billed starthroat breeds from the late wet season into the early dry season in the northern parts of its range. The span in Mexico and Central America is from October/November to February/March. Two broods per season have been observed in Central America. In northern Colombia it nests at least in September/October and March. The timing of breeding is not known in the rest of the species' range. The nest is a shallow cup made of plant down, moss, and liverworts cemented with spider silk and covered with lichen. It is typically placed between 4.5 and 12 m (15 and 39 ft) above the ground in a shrub, on an exposed branch, and even on a telephone wire. The female incubates the two white eggs for 18 to 19 days; fledging occurs 25 to 26 days after hatch.

=== Vocalization ===
The long-billed starthroat's calls include "a rich liquid 'tseep' or 'tsew'" and "sqeaky twitters"; the latter is made during chases.

== Status ==
The IUCN has assessed the long-billed starthroat as being of Least Concern. It has a very large range and a population of at least 500,000 mature individuals. The population, however, is believed to be decreasing. No immediate threats have been identified. It is considered uncommon in most of its range but occurs in several protected areas. It is "evidently able to tolerate much disturbance, and perhaps even favoured by deforestation, as long as scattered trees and groves remain."

== Gallery ==
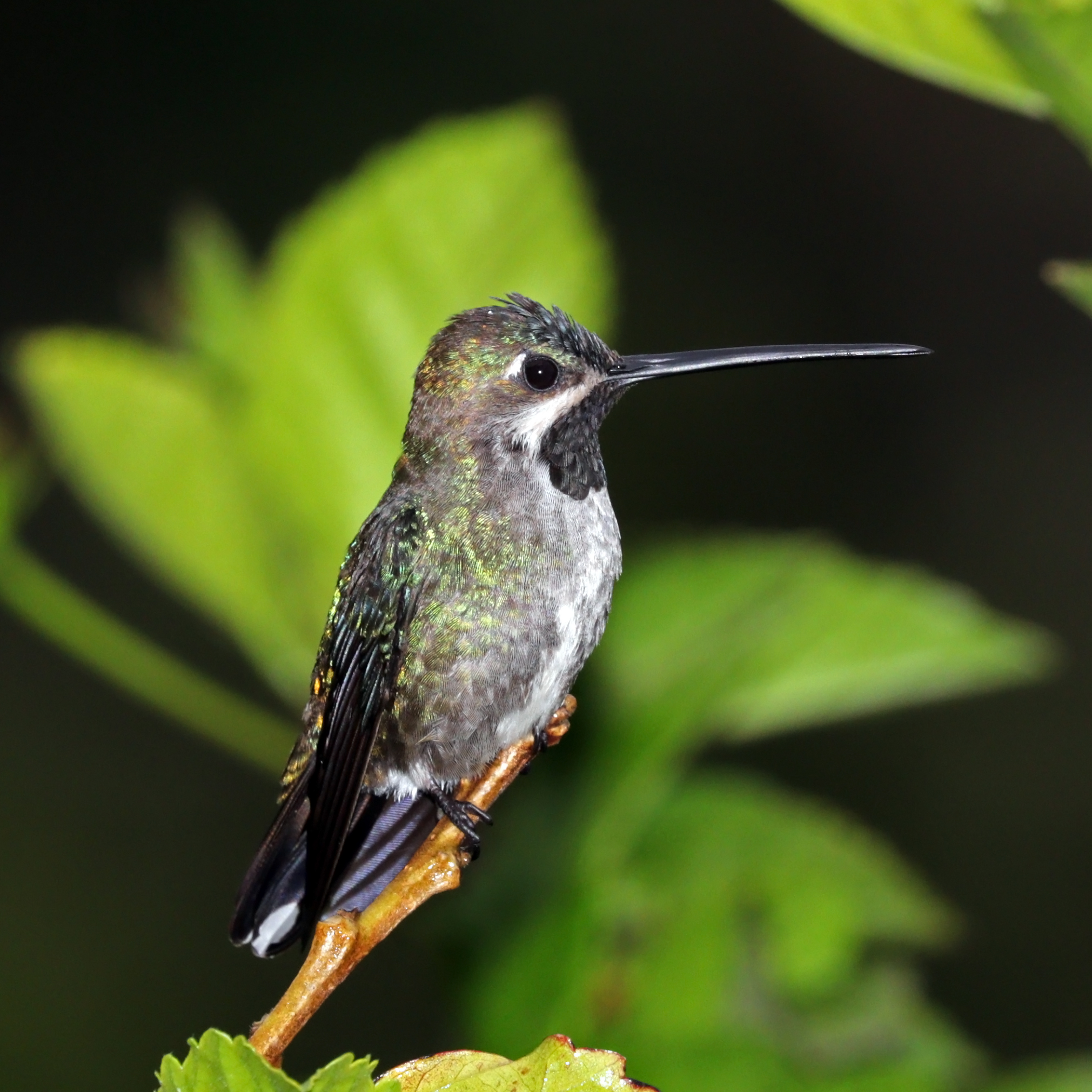
Male, Panama

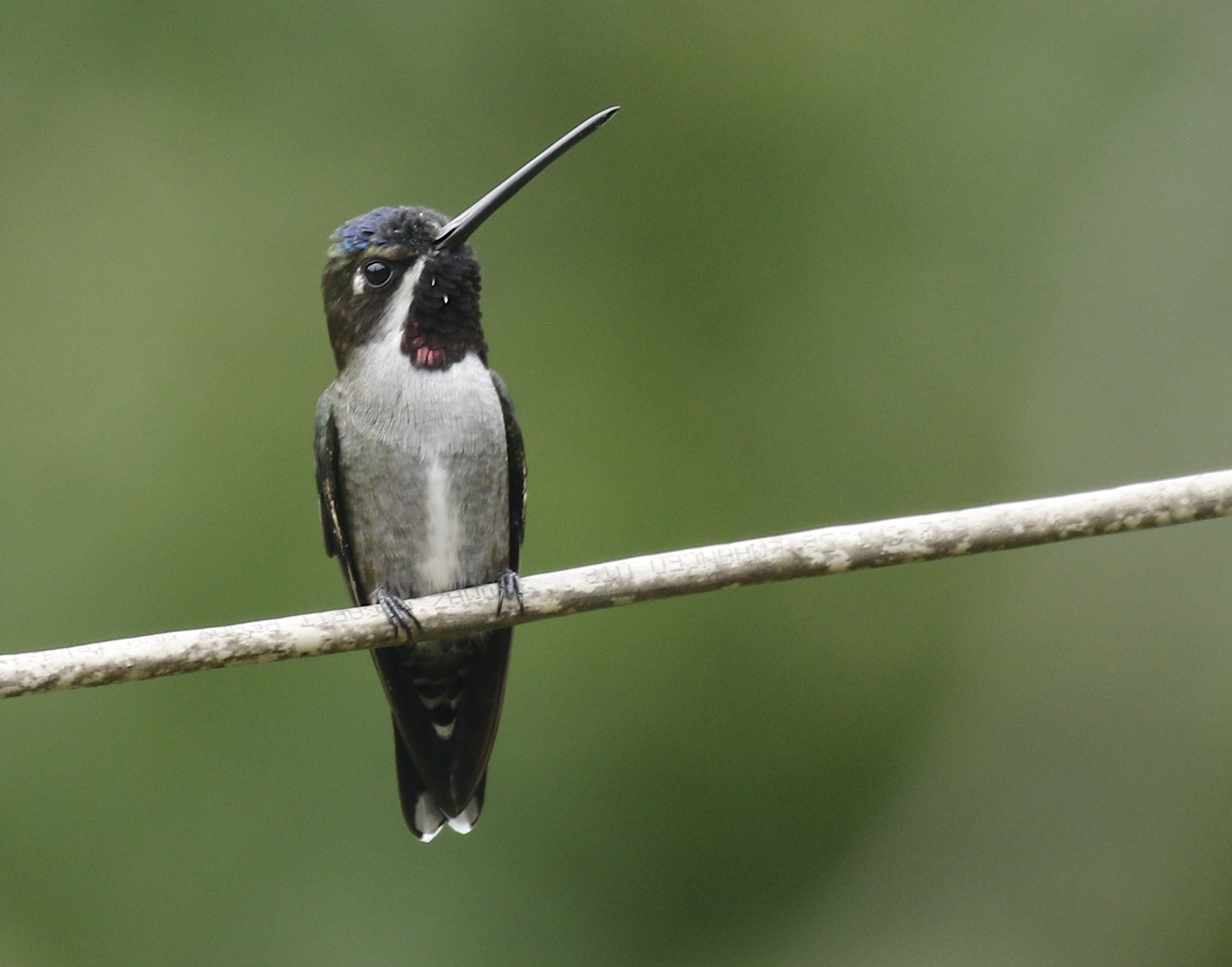
Female - Morti, Panama

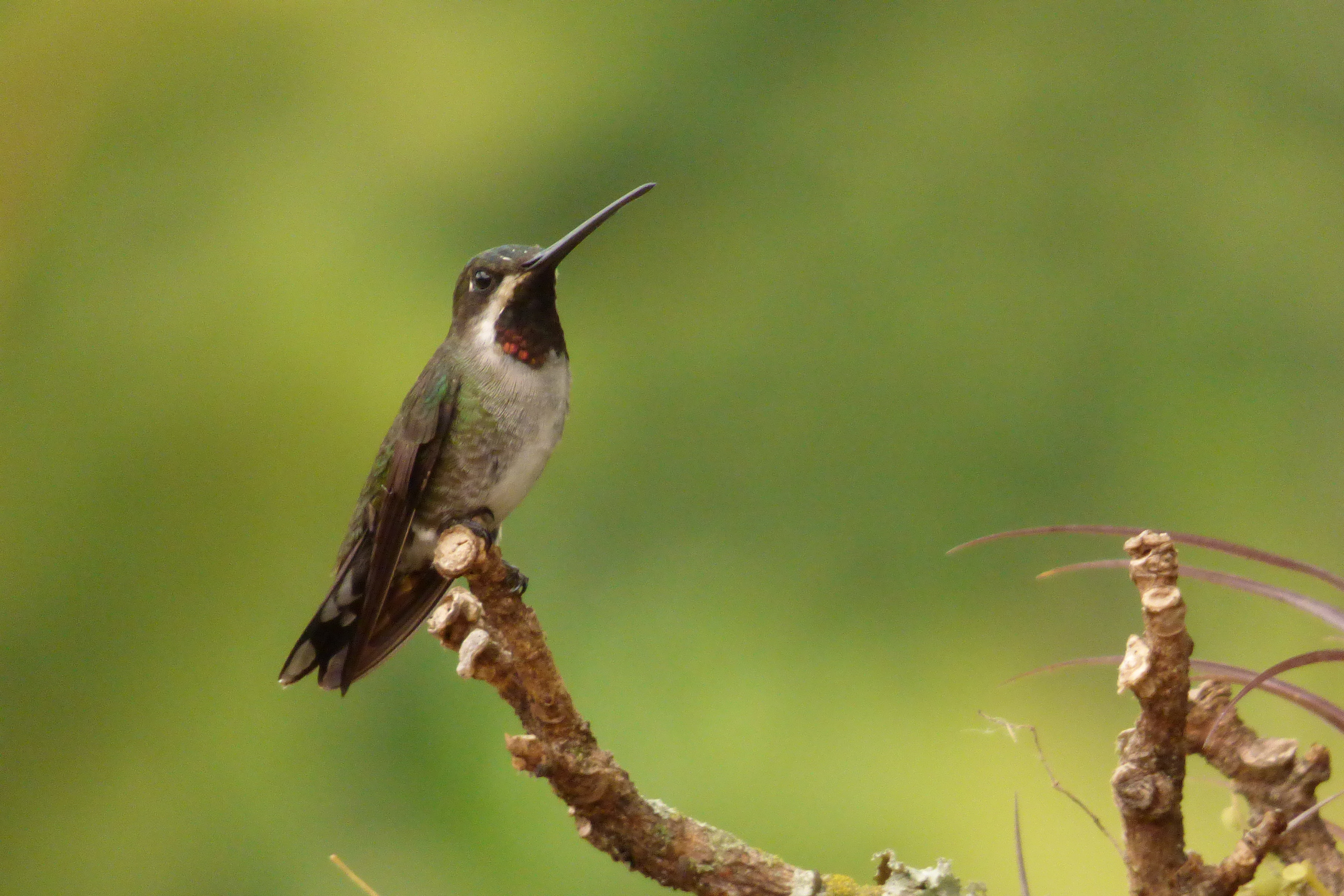
Male
