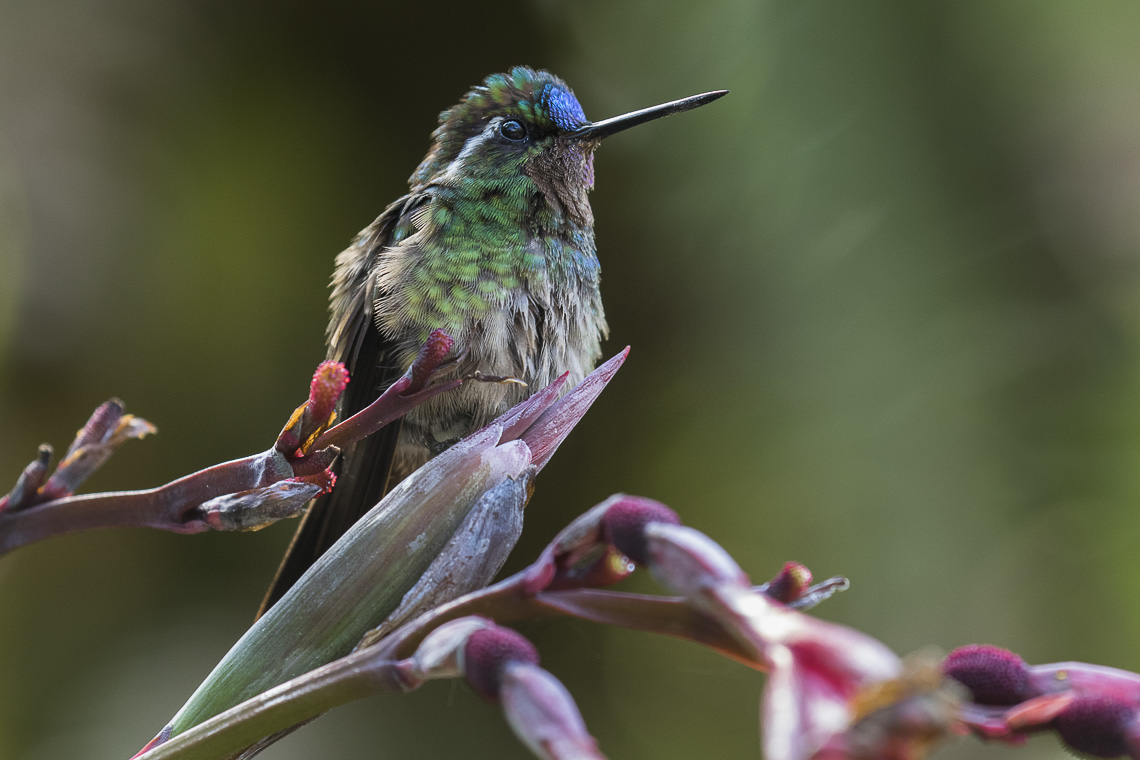
- Purple-throated mountaingem (Lampornis calolaemus)

Scientific classification
- Kingdom: Animalia
- Phylum: Chordata
- Class: Aves
- Order: Apodiformes
- Family: Trochilidae
- Subfamily: Trochilinae
- Tribe: Lampornithini; Jardine, 1833

Genera
- 7, see text

= Lampornithini =

Tribe of birds

Lampornithini is one of the three tribes that make up the subfamily Trochilinae in the hummingbird family Trochilidae. The other two tribes in the subfamily are Mellisugini (bees) and Trochilini (emeralds).

The informal name "mountain gems" has been proposed for this group. The largest genus Lampornis contains eight species with "mountaingem" in their common name. The tribe contains 18 species divided into 7 genera.

== Phylogeny ==
A molecular phylogenetic study of the hummingbirds published in 2007 found that the family was composed of nine major clades. When Edward Dickinson and James Van Remsen Jr. updated the Howard and Moore Complete Checklist of the Birds of the World for the 4th edition in 2013 they based their classification on these results and placed three of the nine clades in the subfamily Trochilinae. The clades were placed in separate tribes which were named Lampornithini (mountain gems), Mellisugini (bees), and Trochilini (emeralds). The tribe Lampornithini with the current circumscription was introduced in 2009. A subfamily based on the genus Lampornis was introduced by William Jardine in 1833. The name Lampornithinae was used by Charles Bonaparte in 1842.

Molecular phylogenetic studies by Jimmy McGuire and collaborators published between 2007 and 2014 determined the relationships between the major groups of hummingbirds. In the cladogram below the English names are those introduced in 1997. The Latin names are those proposed by Dickinson and Remsen in 2013.

- Trochilidae
  - - Florisuginae – topazes
    - Phaethornithinae – hermits
  - - Polytminae – mangoes
    - - Lesbiinae
        - Heliantheini – brilliants
        - Lesbiini – coquettes
      - - Patagoninae – giant hummingbird
        - Trochilinae
          - - Lampornithini – mountain gems
            - Mellisugini – bees
          - Trochilini – emeralds

The cladogram below shows the relationships between the genera in the tribe Lampornithini. It is based on the molecular phylogenetic study published in 2014. The genera Sternoclyta and Hylonympha were not sampled.

- Lampornithini
  - - Lampornis
    - - - Lamprolaima
        - Eugenes
      - - Panterpe
        - Heliomaster

== Taxonomic list ==
The tribe contains 7 genera.

Image	Genus	Living species
	Sternoclyta	Violet-chested hummingbird, Sternoclyta cyanopectus
	Hylonympha	Scissor-tailed hummingbird, Hylonympha macrocerca
	Eugenes	Rivoli's hummingbird, Eugenes fulgens; Talamanca hummingbird, Eugenes spectabilis
	Panterpe	Fiery-throated hummingbird, Panterpe insignis
	Heliomaster	Long-billed starthroat, Heliomaster longirostris; Plain-capped starthroat, Heliomaster constantii; Stripe-breasted starthroat, Heliomaster squamosus; Blue-tufted starthroat, Heliomaster furcifer
	Lampornis	White-bellied mountaingem, Lampornis hemileucus; Blue-throated mountaingem, Lampornis clemenciae; Amethyst-throated mountaingem, Lampornis amethystinus; Green-throated mountaingem, Lampornis viridipallens; Green-breasted mountaingem, Lampornis sybillae; Purple-throated mountaingem, Lampornis calolaemus; Gray-tailed mountaingem, Lampornis cinereicauda; White-throated mountaingem, Lampornis castaneoventris
	Lamprolaima	Garnet-throated hummingbird, Lamprolaima rhami

== Sources ==
- Dickinson, E.C.; Remsen, J.V. Jr., eds. (2013). The Howard & Moore Complete Checklist of the Birds of the World. Vol. 1: Non-passerines (4th ed.). Eastbourne, UK: Aves Press. ISBN 978-0-9568611-0-8.
