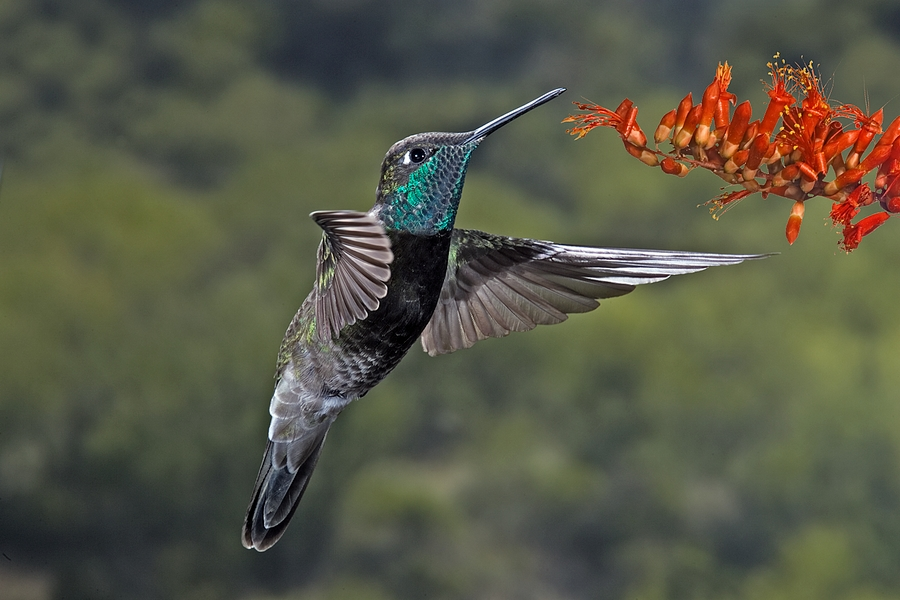
- Rivoli's hummingbird (Eugenes fulgens)

Scientific classification
- Kingdom: Animalia
- Phylum: Chordata
- Class: Aves
- Order: Apodiformes
- Family: Trochilidae
- Tribe: Lampornithini
- Genus: Eugenes; Gould, 1856

Type species
- Trochilus fulgens Swainson, 1827

Species
- 2, see text

= Eugenes =

Genus of birds

Eugenes is a genus of hummingbirds that inhabit North America.

== Species ==
The genus contains two species:

Genus Eugenes – Gould, 1856 – two species
Common name	Scientific name and subspecies	Range	Size and ecology	IUCN status and estimated population
Rivoli's hummingbird Male Female	Eugenes fulgens (Swainson, 1827)	southwestern United States to Honduras and Nicaragua.	Size: Habitat: Diet:	LC
Talamanca hummingbird Male Female	Eugenes spectabilis (Lawrence, 1867)	Costa Rica to Panama.	Size: Habitat: Diet:	LC
