= Edward C. Dickinson =

British ornithologist (born 1938)

Edward Clive Dickinson (born 6 March 1938) is a British ornithologist specialising in the taxonomy of southeast Asian birds.

== Biography ==
Edward Dickinson was born in 1938, in Paget Parish, Bermuda, the son of Lionel Gilbert Dickinson and Eileen Dickinson née Barlow. He was educated at Westminster School. After leaving school he worked from 1962 as a product manager for Pronesiam Inc. in Bangkok. In 1965 he married Dorothy Sopper, with whom he has two children. From 1968 to 1970, he was the editor of the National Historical Bulletin of the Siam Society. In 1971, Dickinson moved to Nestlé, where he worked until 1973 as a project manager. From 1973 to 1975, he worked for Filipro in Manila.

In 1975, Dickinson had his first ornithological book published, A Field Guide to the Birds of Southeast Asia, coauthored with Ben F. King. In 1991, his The Birds of the Philippines: An Annotated Checklist was published. It was followed by various manuals and checklists, and finally a professional ornithological position at Naturalis in Leiden, where he worked as a research associate as of 2012. Dickinson founded the publishing house Aves Press Limited, and is a member of the International Commission on Zoological Nomenclature.

Dickinson has built on his lifelong passion for ornithology to make numerous contributions to taxonomy. Together with René Dekker he wrote Systematic Notes on Asian Birds, a series of articles devoted to the taxonomic revision of the Asian avifauna. Since 2011 he has been the editor of Zoological Bibliography, an open-access journal for taxonomy.

In 1997, Dickinson took on editorship of the Howard and Moore Checklist of the Birds of the World, contributing to the publication of the 3rd Edition in 2003 and the 4th in 2014.
