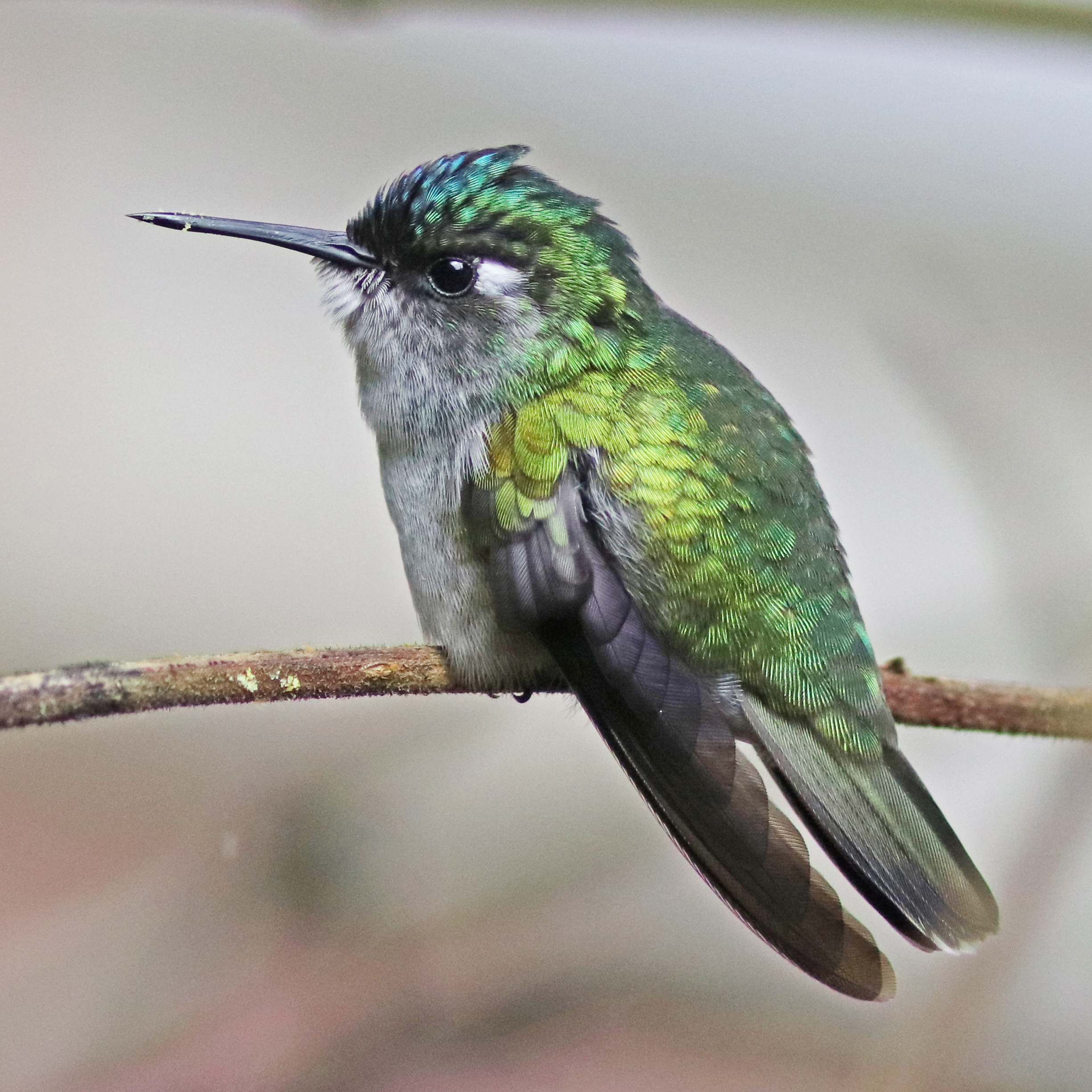
- Female violet-headed hummingbird (Klais guimeti)

Scientific classification
- Kingdom: Animalia
- Phylum: Chordata
- Class: Aves
- Order: Apodiformes
- Family: Trochilidae
- Subfamily: Trochilinae; Reichenbach, 1854

Tribes
- 3, see text

= Trochilinae =

Subfamily of hummingbirds

Trochilinae is one of the six subfamilies that make up the hummingbird family Trochilidae.

The subfamily is divided into three tribes: Lampornithini (mountain gems) containing 18 species, Mellisugini (bees) containing 37 species and Trochilini (emeralds) containing 115 species.

== Phylogeny ==
The hummingbirds were formerly divided into two subfamilies, the hermits (Phaethornithinae) and the nonhermits (Trochilinae). The results from a 2007 DNA hybridization study suggested that the hermits were basal to the rest of the family.

A molecular phylogenetic study of the hummingbirds published in 2007 found that the family consisted of nine clades. When Edward Dickinson and James Van Remsen Jr. updated the Howard and Moore Complete Checklist of the Birds of the World for the 4th edition in 2013, they divided the hummingbird family into six subfamilies based on the molecular results and redefined the subfamily Trochilinae to contain three clades, each of which they placed in a separate tribe: Lampornithini (mountain gems), Mellisugini (bees) and Trochilini (emeralds). A comprehensive phylogenetic study that sampled 284 hummingbird species was published in 2014. It confirmed the nine clades found in the earlier study but found that the hermits were sister to the topazes clade (subfamily Florisuginae) containing the genera Topaza and Florisuga. Many of the traditional genera in the emerald clade (Trochilini) were shown to be polyphyletic. As a result, many of the genera in this part of the tree have been revised.

- Trochilidae
  - - Florisuginae – topazes
    - Phaethornithinae – hermits
  - - Polytminae – mangoes
    - - Lesbiinae
        - Heliantheini – brilliants
        - Lesbiini – coquettes
      - - Patagoninae – giant hummingbird
        - Trochilinae
          - - Lampornithini – mountain gems
            - Mellisugini – bees
          - Trochilini – emeralds

The above cladogram of the hummingbird family is based on a molecular phylogenetic study by Jimmy McGuire and collaborators published in 2014. The Latin names are those proposed by Dickinson and Remsen in 2013.

== Sources ==
- Dickinson, E.C.; Remsen, J.V. Jr., eds. (2013). The Howard & Moore Complete Checklist of the Birds of the World. Vol. 1: Non-passerines (4th ed.). Eastbourne, UK: Aves Press. ISBN 978-0-9568611-0-8.
