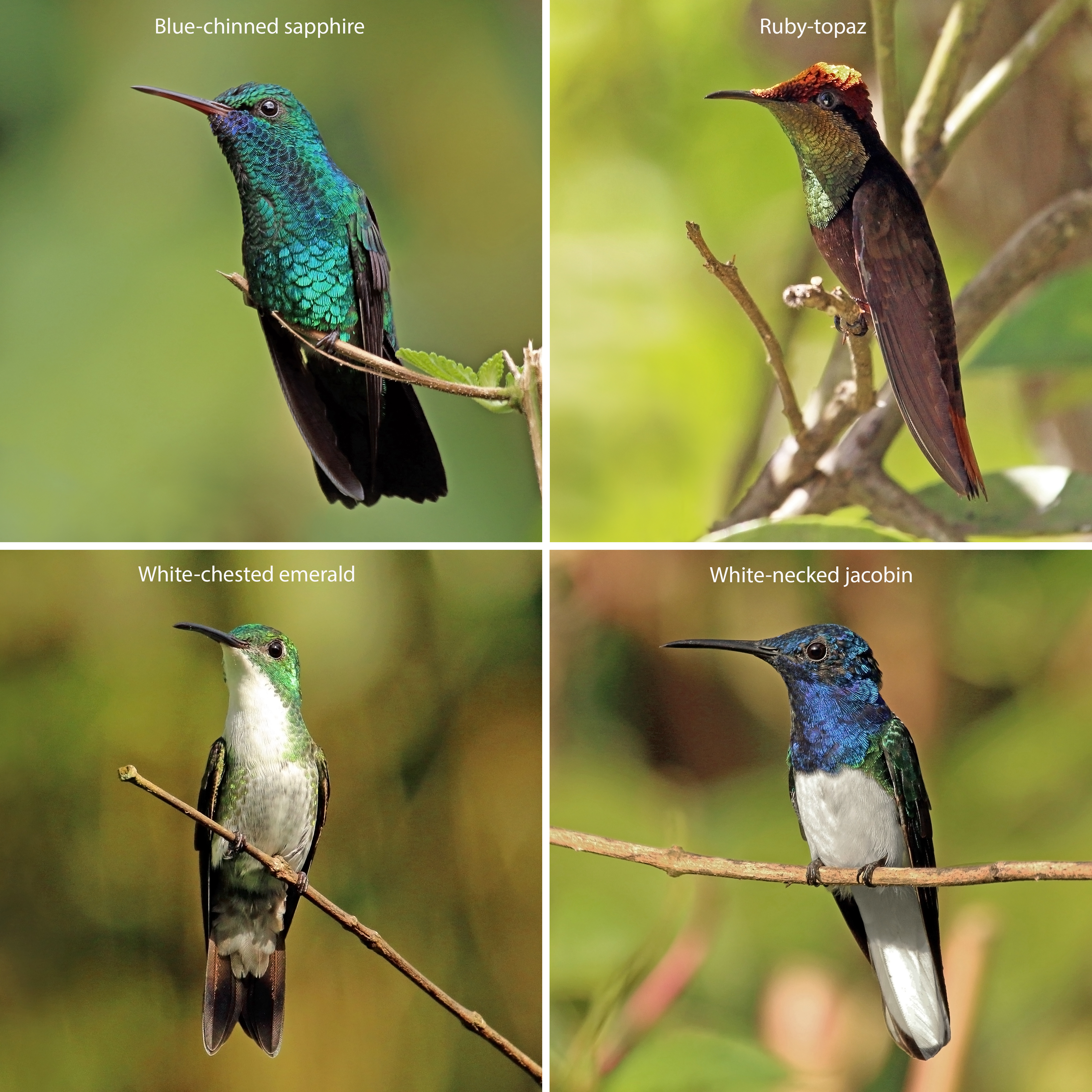
- Four hummingbirds from Trinidad and Tobago

Scientific classification
- Kingdom: Animalia
- Phylum: Chordata
- Class: Aves
- Order: Apodiformes
- Family: Trochilidae; Vigors, 1825

Type genus
- Trochilus Linnaeus, 1758

Subfamilies
- Subfamiles: †Eurotrochilus; Florisuginae; Phaethornithinae; Polytminae; Lesbiinae; Patagoninae; Trochilinae; (For an alphabetic species list, see List of hummingbirds)

= Hummingbird =

Hummingbird Temporal range: Rupelian 30–0 Ma

Family of birds

Hummingbirds are birds native to the Americas and comprise the biological family Trochilidae. With around 375 species in 113 genera, they occur from Alaska to Tierra del Fuego, but most species are found in Central and South America. As of 2026, 21 hummingbird species are listed as endangered or critically endangered, with about 255 species declining in population.

Hummingbirds have varied specialized characteristics to enable rapid, maneuverable flight: exceptional metabolic capacity, adaptations to high altitude, sensitive visual and communication abilities, and long-distance migration in some species. Among all birds, male hummingbirds have the widest diversity of plumage color, particularly in blues, greens, and purples. Hummingbirds are the smallest mature birds, measuring 7.5–13 cm (3–5 in) in length. The smallest is the 5 cm (2.0 in) bee hummingbird, which weighs less than 2.0 g (0.07 oz), and the largest is the 23 cm (9 in) giant hummingbird, weighing 17–31 grams (0.60–1.09 oz). Noted for long beaks, hummingbirds are specialized for feeding on flower nectar, but all species also consume small insects.

Hummingbirds are known by that name because of the humming sound created by their beating wings, which flap at high frequencies audible to other birds and humans. They hover at rapid wing-flapping rates, which vary from around 12 beats per second in the largest species to 99 per second in small hummingbirds.

Hummingbirds have the highest mass-specific metabolic rate of any homeothermic animal. To conserve energy when food is scarce and at night when not foraging, they can enter torpor, a state similar to hibernation, and slow their metabolic rate to 1/15 of its normal rate. While most hummingbirds do not migrate, the rufous hummingbird has one of the longest migrations among birds, traveling twice per year between Alaska and Mexico, a distance of about 3,900 miles (6,300 km).

Hummingbirds split from their sister group, the swifts and treeswifts, around 42 million years ago. The oldest known fossil hummingbird is Eurotrochilus, from the Rupelian Stage of Early Oligocene Europe.

== Description ==
Size of Mellisuga helenae (bee hummingbird) – the world's smallest bird – compared to a human hand

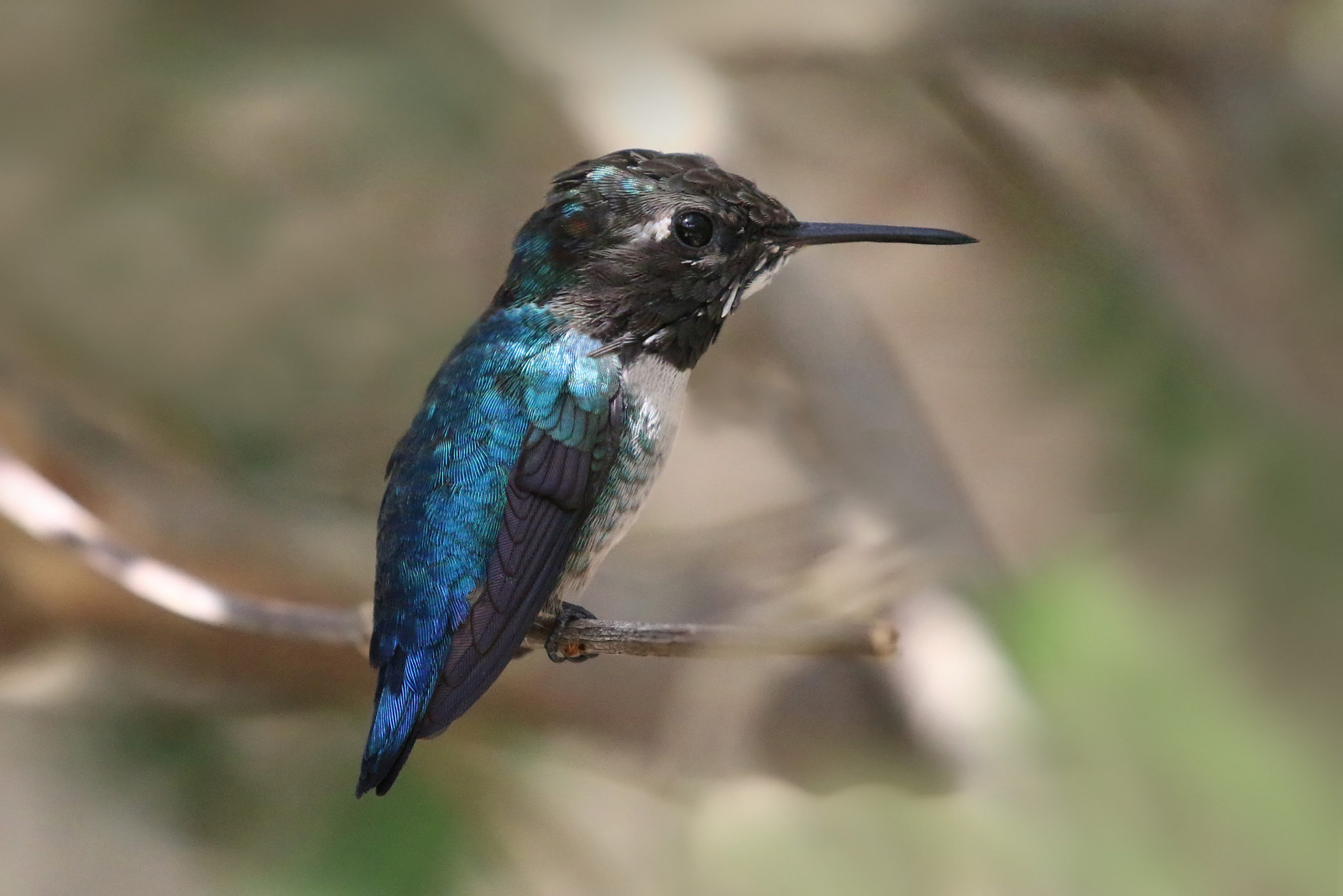
Adult male bee hummingbird, Cuba

Hummingbirds are the smallest known and smallest living avian theropod dinosaurs. The iridescent colors and highly specialized feathers of many species (mainly in males) give some hummingbirds exotic common names, such as sun gem, fairy, woodstar, sapphire, or sylph.

=== Morphology ===
Across the estimated 375 species, hummingbird weights range from as small as 2.0 grams (0.071 oz) to as large as 20 grams (0.71 oz). They have characteristic long, narrow beaks (bills), which may be straight (of varying lengths) or highly curved. The bee hummingbird – only 6 centimetres (2.4 in) long and weighing about 2 grams (0.071 oz) – is the world's smallest bird and smallest warm-blooded vertebrate. The giant hummingbird is the largest, having a mass of 17–31 g (0.60–1.09 oz) – about twice as heavy as the next-largest hummingbird – with a wingspan of 21.5 cm (8.5 in) and body length of 23 cm (9.1 in).

Hummingbirds have compact bodies with relatively long, bladelike wings having anatomical structure enabling helicopter-like flight in any direction, including the ability to hover. Particularly while hovering, the wing beats produce the humming sounds, which function to alert other birds. In some species, the tail feathers produce sounds used by males during courtship flying. One species of hummingbird – the little woodstar (Chaetocercus bombus) – has a wing-beat frequency of 99 per second during hovering. Such extreme flight demands are supported by a high metabolic rate dependent on foraging for sugars from flower nectar.

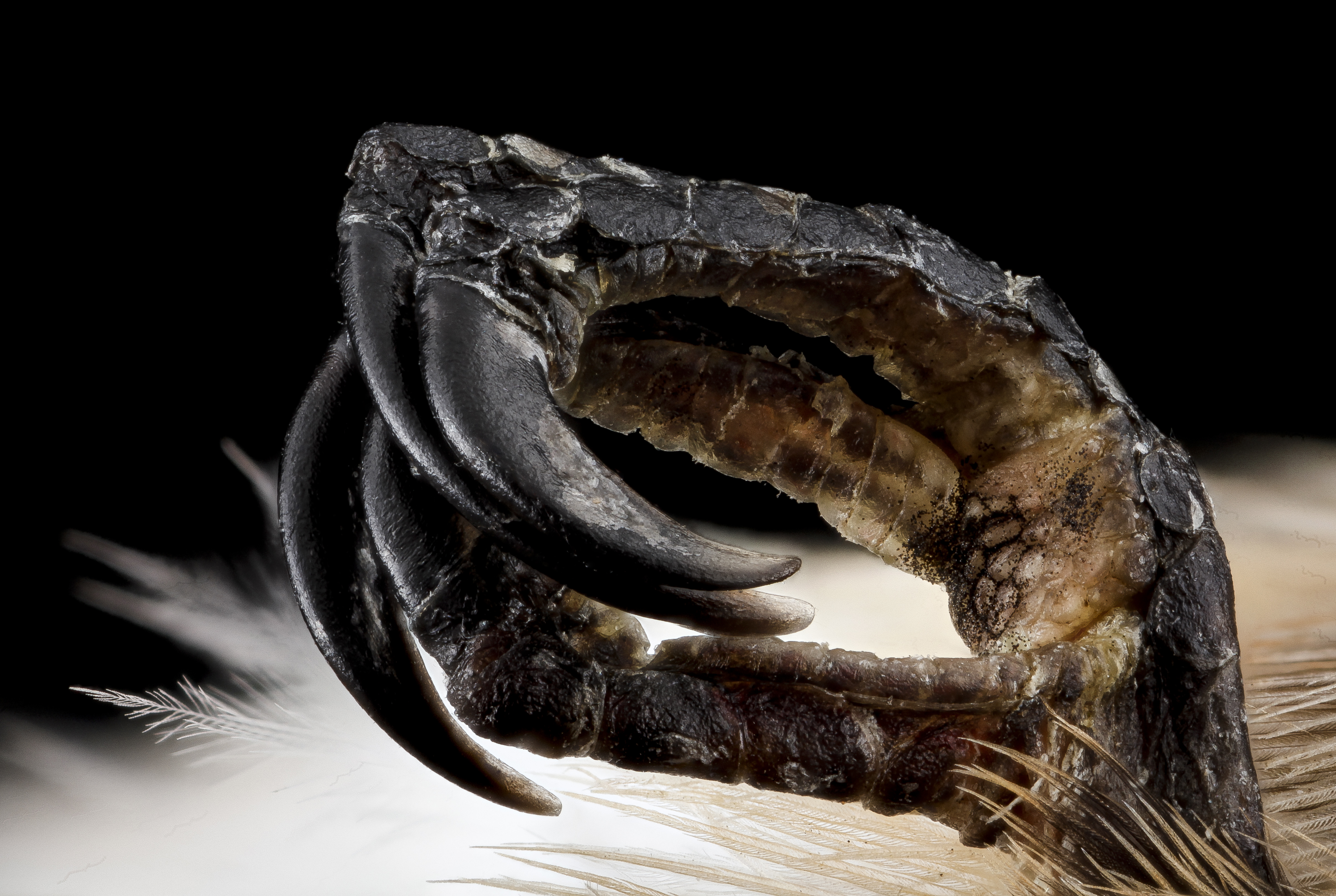
Close-up of toe arrangement in a ruby-throated hummingbird foot, showing three claw-like toes forward and one backward

Hummingbird legs are short with feet having three toes pointing forward and one backward – the hallux. The toes of hummingbirds are formed as claws with ridged inner surfaces to aid gripping onto flower stems or petals. Hummingbirds do not walk on the ground or hop like most birds, but rather shuffle laterally and use their feet to grip while perching, preening feathers, or nest-building (by females), and during fights to grab feathers of opponents.

Hummingbirds apply their legs as pistons for generating thrust upon taking flight, although the shortness of their legs provides about 20% less propulsion than assessed in other birds. During flight, hummingbird feet are tucked up under the body, enabling optimal aerodynamics and maneuverability.

Of those species that have been measured during flight, the top flight speeds of hummingbirds exceed 15 m/s (54 km/h; 34 mph). During courtship, some male species dive from 30 metres (100 ft) of height above a female at speeds around 23 m/s (83 km/h; 51 mph).

The sexes differ in feather coloration, with males having distinct brilliance and ornamentation of head, neck, wing, and breast feathers. The most typical feather ornament in males is the gorget – a bib-like iridescent neck-feather patch that changes brilliance with the viewing angle to attract females and warn male competitors away from territory.

=== Lifecycle ===
Hummingbirds begin mating when they are a year old. Sex occurs over 3–5 seconds when the male joins its cloaca with the female's, passing sperm to fertilize the female's eggs.

Hummingbird females build a nest resembling a small cup about 1.5 inches (3.8 cm) in diameter, commonly attached to a tree branch using spider webs, lichens, moss, and loose strings of plant fibers (image). Typically, two pea-sized white eggs (image) – the smallest of any bird – are incubated over 2–3 weeks in breeding season. Fed by regurgitation only from the mother, the chicks fledge about 3 weeks after hatching.

As the nestlings develop juvenile plumage, they do more and more wing flapping as they develop their ability to fly. The nestlings finally leave the nest (fledge), but are initially awkward fliers still fed by their mother.

Nectar-feeding hummingbirds ingest large volumes of liquid that must be eliminated. Nestlings elevate their cloaca, ejecting a stream of dilute liquid containing suspended fecal material beyond the rim of the nest.

The average lifespan of a ruby-throated hummingbird is estimated to be 3–5 years, with most deaths occurring in yearlings, although one banded ruby-throated hummingbird lived for 9 years and 2 months. Bee hummingbirds live 7–10 years.

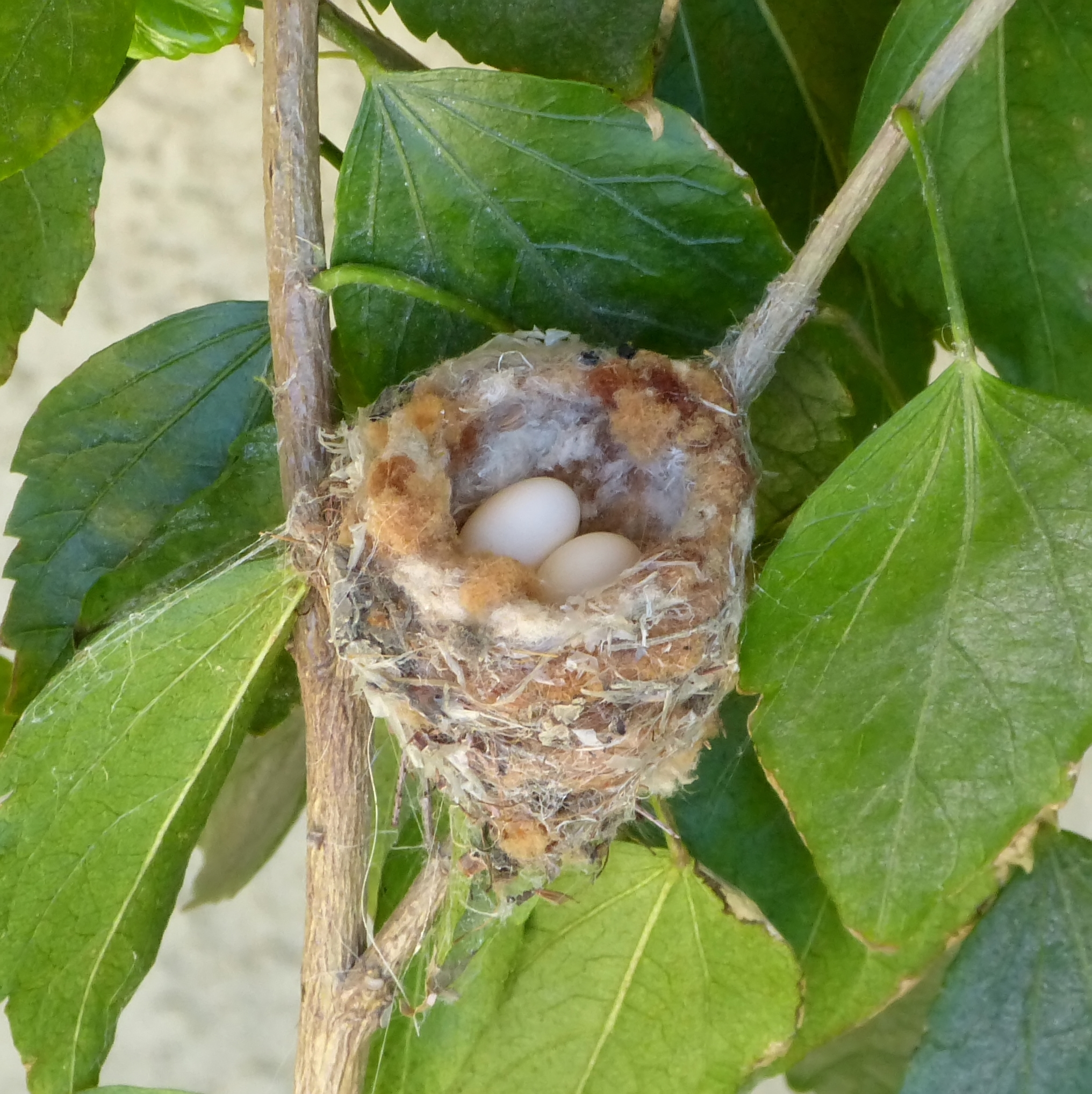
Each approximately the size of a pea, two eggs in the nest of an Allen's hummingbird

Female Anna's hummingbird regurgitation feeding its young about 11 days before they fledge, one portion at one-fourth speed

Nestling Anna's hummingbirds ejecting urine and fecal material, about 8 days before fledging, repeated at one-tenth speed

Nestling Anna's hummingbirds flapping their wings one and two days before fledging

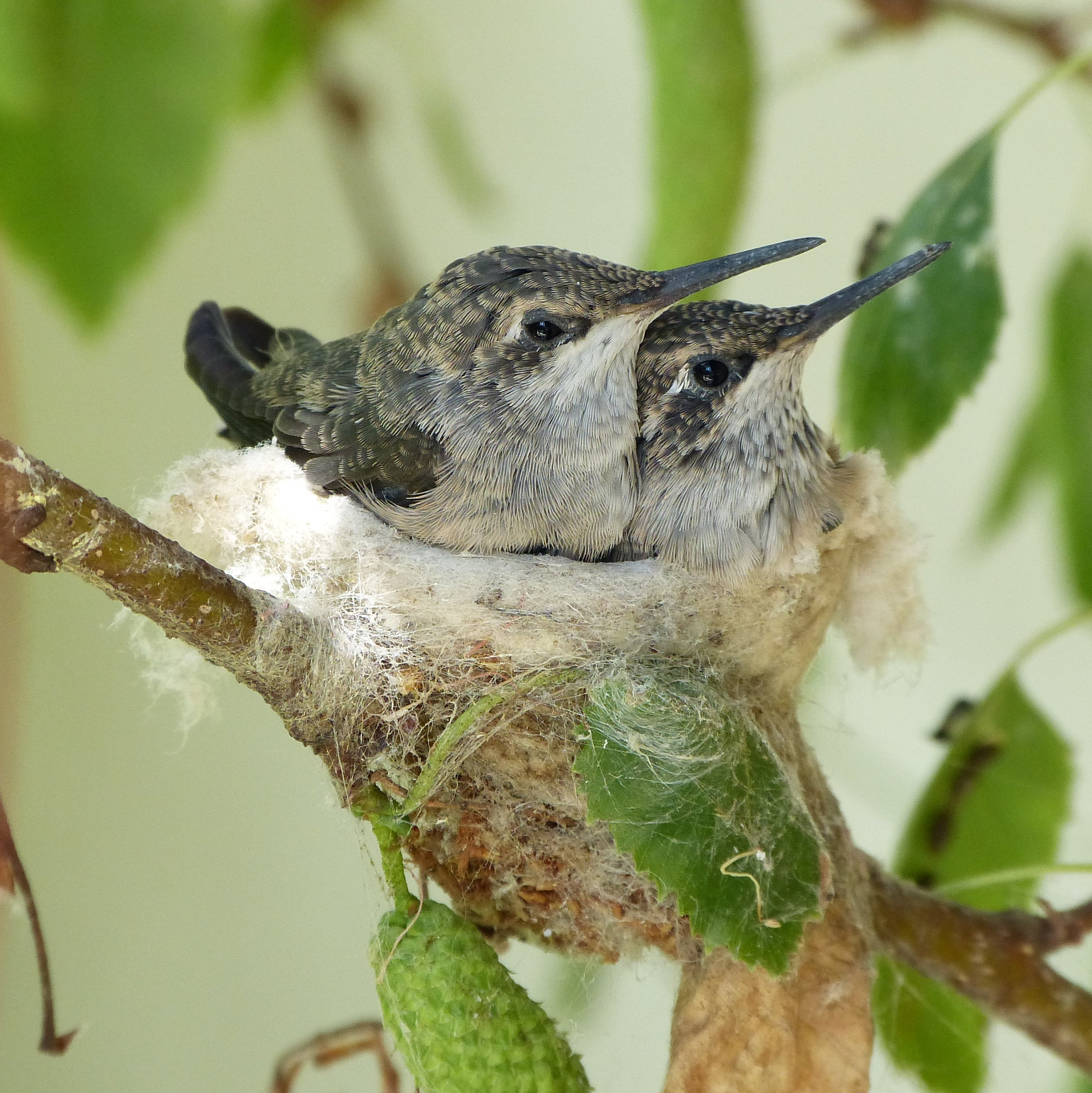
Hummingbird nestlings ready to fledge

A slow, awkward Anna's hummingbird a day after fledging

=== Population estimates and threatened species ===
Although most hummingbird species live in remote habitats, where their population numbers are difficult to assess, population studies in the United States and Canada indicate that the ruby-throated hummingbird numbers are around 34 million, rufous hummingbirds are around 19 million, black-chinned, Anna's, and broad-tailed hummingbirds are about 8 million each, calliopes at 4 million, and Costa's and Allen's hummingbirds are around 2 million each. Several species exist only in the thousands or hundreds.

According to the International Union for Conservation of Nature Red List of Threatened Species in 2026, eight hummingbird species are classified as critically endangered, 13 are endangered, 13 are vulnerable, and 22 species are near threatened. Two species – Brace's emerald (Riccordia bracei) and Caribbean emerald (Riccordia elegans) – have been declared extinct. Although 316 species are considered to be of least concern, 255 species are declining in population numbers, with only 87 species rated as stable and eight increasing in numbers.

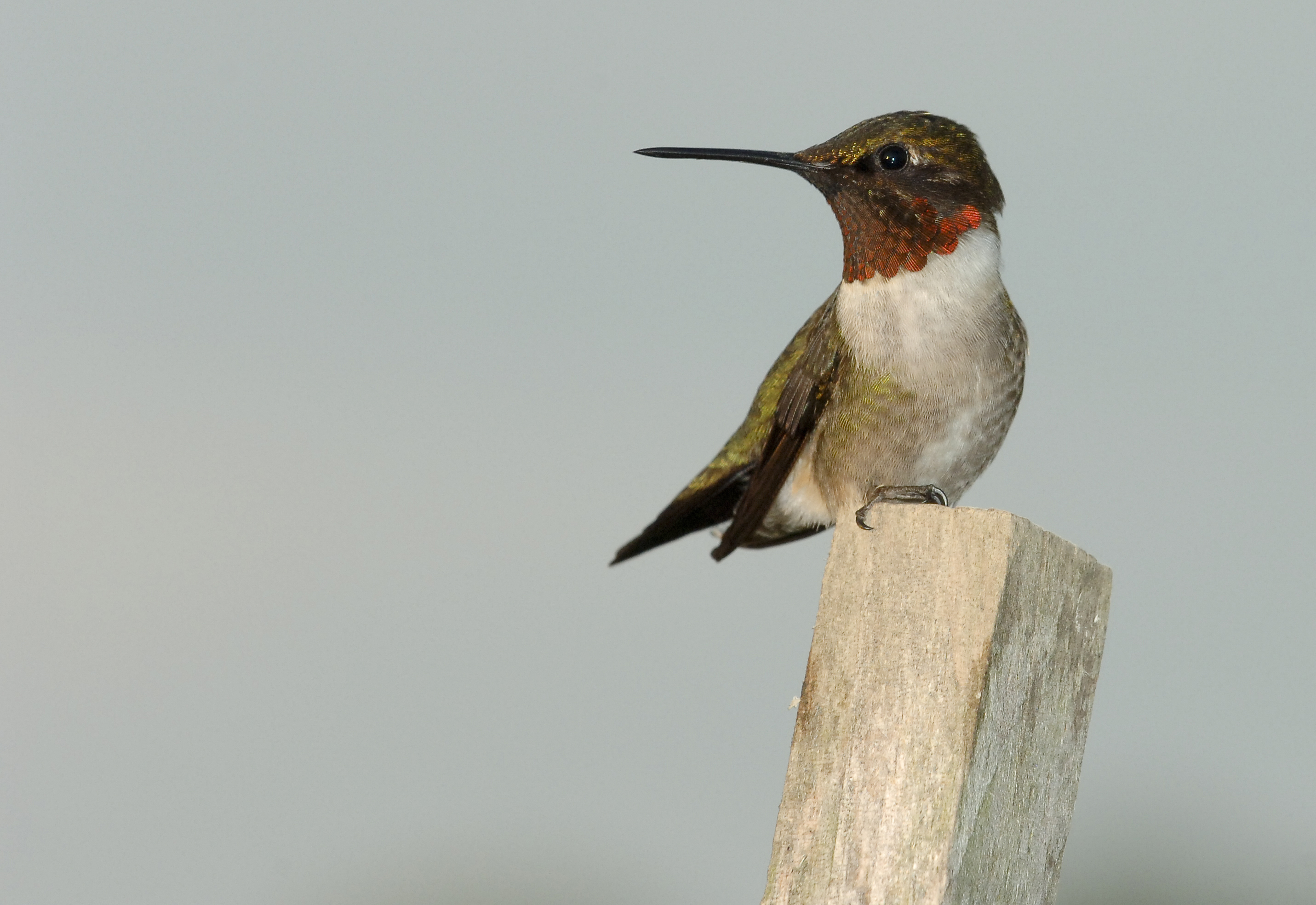
Male ruby-throated hummingbird (Archilochus colubris)

Of the 15 species of North American hummingbirds that inhabit the United States and Canada, several have changed their range of distribution, while others showed declines in numbers since the 1970s, including in 2023 with dozens of hummingbird species in decline. As of the 21st century, rufous, Costa's, calliope, broad-tailed, and Allen's hummingbirds are in significant decline, some losing as much as 67% of their numbers since 1970 at nearly double the rate of population loss over the previous 50 years. The ruby-throated hummingbird population – the most populous North American hummingbird – decreased by 17% over the early 21st century. Habitat loss, glass collisions, cat predation, pesticides, and possibly climate change affecting food availability, migration signals, and breeding are factors that may contribute to declining hummingbird numbers. By contrast, Anna's hummingbirds had large population growth at an accelerating rate since 2010, and expanded their range northward to reside year-round in cold winter climates.

=== Superficially similar species ===
Some species of sunbirds – an Old World group restricted in distribution to Eurasia, Africa, and Australia – resemble hummingbirds in appearance and behavior, but are not related to hummingbirds, as their resemblance is due to convergent evolution.

The hummingbird moth has flying and feeding characteristics similar to those of a hummingbird. Hummingbirds may be mistaken for hummingbird hawk-moths, which are large, flying insects with hovering capabilities, and exist only in Eurasia.

== Range ==
Hummingbirds are restricted to the Americas from south-central Alaska to Tierra del Fuego, including the Caribbean. Most species occur in tropical and subtropical Central and South America, but several species also breed in temperate climates and some hillstars occur even in alpine Andean highlands at altitudes up to 5,200 m (17,100 ft).

The greatest species richness is in humid tropical and subtropical forests of the northern Andes and adjacent foothills, but the number of species found in the Atlantic Forest, Central America, or southern Mexico also far exceeds the number found in southern South America, the Caribbean islands, the United States, and Canada. While fewer than 25 different species of hummingbirds have been recorded from the United States and fewer than 10 from Canada and Chile each, Colombia alone has more than 160 and the comparably small Ecuador has about 130 species.

== Taxonomy and systematics ==
The family Trochilidae was introduced in 1825 by Irish zoologist Nicholas Aylward Vigors with Trochilus as the type genus. In traditional taxonomy, hummingbirds are placed in the order Apodiformes, which also contains the swifts, but some taxonomists have separated them into their own order, the Trochiliformes.

Hummingbird wing bones are hollow and fragile, making fossilization difficult and leaving their evolutionary history poorly documented. Though scientists theorize that hummingbirds originated in South America, where species diversity is greatest, possible ancestors of extant hummingbirds may have lived in parts of Europe and what is southern Russia today.

As of 2025, 375 hummingbird species have been identified. They have been traditionally divided into two subfamilies: the hermits (Phaethornithinae) and the typical hummingbirds (Trochilinae, including all the other species). Molecular phylogenetic studies have shown, though, that the hermits are sister to the topazes and jacobins, making the former definition of the Trochilinae not monophyletic. The hummingbirds form nine major clades: the topazes and jacobins, the hermits, the mangoes, the coquettes, the brilliants, the giant hummingbird (Patagona gigas), the mountaingems, the bees, and the emeralds. The topazes and jacobins combined have the oldest split with the rest of the hummingbirds. The hummingbird family has the third-greatest number of species of any bird family (after the tyrant flycatchers and the tanagers).

Fossil hummingbirds are known from the Pleistocene of Brazil and the Bahamas, but neither has yet been scientifically described, and fossils and subfossils of a few extant species are known. Until recently, older fossils had not been securely identifiable as those of hummingbirds.

In 2004, Gerald Mayr identified two 30-million-year-old hummingbird fossils. The fossils of this primitive hummingbird species, named Eurotrochilus inexpectatus ("unexpected European hummingbird"), had been sitting in a museum drawer in Stuttgart; they had been unearthed in a clay pit at Wiesloch–Frauenweiler, south of Heidelberg, Germany, and because hummingbirds were assumed to have never occurred outside the Americas, were not recognized to be hummingbirds until Mayr took a closer look at them.

Fossils of birds not clearly assignable to either hummingbirds or a related extinct family, the Jungornithidae, have been found at the Messel pit and in the Caucasus, dating from 35 to 40 million years ago; this indicates that the split between these two lineages indeed occurred around that time. The areas where these early fossils have been found had a climate quite similar to that of the northern Caribbean or southernmost China during that time. The biggest remaining mystery at present is what happened to hummingbirds in the roughly 25 million years between the primitive Eurotrochilus and the modern fossils. The astounding morphological adaptations, the decrease in size, and the dispersal to the Americas and extinction in Eurasia all occurred during this timespan. DNA–DNA hybridization results suggest that the main radiation of South American hummingbirds took place at least partly in the Miocene, some 12 to 13 million years ago, during the uplifting of the northern Andes.

In 2013, a 50-million-year-old bird fossil unearthed in Wyoming was found to be a predecessor to hummingbirds and swifts before the groups diverged.

== Evolution ==
Hummingbirds split from other members of Apodiformes, the insectivorous swifts (family Apodidae) and treeswifts (family Hemiprocnidae), about 42 million years ago, probably in Eurasia. Despite their current New World distribution, the earliest species of hummingbird occurred in the early Oligocene (Rupelian about 34–28 million years ago) of Europe, belonging to the genus Eurotrochilus, having similar morphology to modern hummingbirds.

=== Phylogeny ===
A phylogenetic tree unequivocally indicates that modern hummingbirds originated in South America, with the last common ancestor of all living hummingbirds living around 22 million years ago.

A map of the hummingbird family tree – reconstructed from analysis of 284 species – shows rapid diversification from 22 million years ago. Molecular phylogenetic studies of the hummingbirds have shown that the family is composed of nine major clades. – the topazes, hermits, mangoes, brilliants, coquettes, the giant hummingbird, mountaingems, bees, and emeralds – defining their relationship to nectar-bearing flowering plants which attract hummingbirds into new geographic areas. When Edward Dickinson and James Van Remsen Jr. updated the Howard and Moore Complete Checklist of the Birds of the World for the 4th edition in 2013, they divided the hummingbirds into six subfamilies.

Molecular phylogenetic studies determined the relationships between the major groups of hummingbirds. In the cladogram below, the English names are those introduced in 1997. The scientific names are those introduced in 2013.

- Trochilidae
  - - Florisuginae – topazes
    - Phaethornithinae – hermits
  - - Polytminae – mangoes
    - - Lesbiinae
        - Heliantheini – brilliants
        - Lesbiini – coquettes
      - - Patagoninae – giants
        - Trochilinae
          - - Lampornithini – mountain gems
            - Mellisugini – bees
          - Trochilini – emeralds

While all hummingbirds depend on flower nectar to fuel their high metabolisms and hovering flight, coordinated changes in flower and bill shape stimulated the formation of new species of hummingbirds and plants. Due to this exceptional evolutionary pattern, as many as 140 hummingbird species can coexist in a specific region, such as the Andes range.

The hummingbird evolutionary tree shows that one key evolutionary factor appears to have been an altered taste receptor that enabled hummingbirds to seek nectar.

Upon maturity, males of a particular species, Phaethornis longirostris, the long-billed hermit, appear to be evolving a dagger-like weapon on the beak tip as a secondary sexual trait to defend mating areas.

=== Geographic diversification ===
The Andes Mountains appear to be a particularly rich environment for hummingbird evolution because diversification occurred simultaneously with mountain uplift over the past 10 million years. Hummingbirds remain in dynamic diversification inhabiting ecological regions across South America, North America, and the Caribbean, indicating an enlarging evolutionary radiation.

Within the same geographic region, hummingbird clades coevolved with nectar-bearing plant clades, affecting mechanisms of pollination. The same is true for the sword-billed hummingbird (Ensifera ensifera), one of the morphologically most extreme species, and one of its main food plant clades (Passiflora section Tacsonia).

=== Coevolution with ornithophilous flowers ===
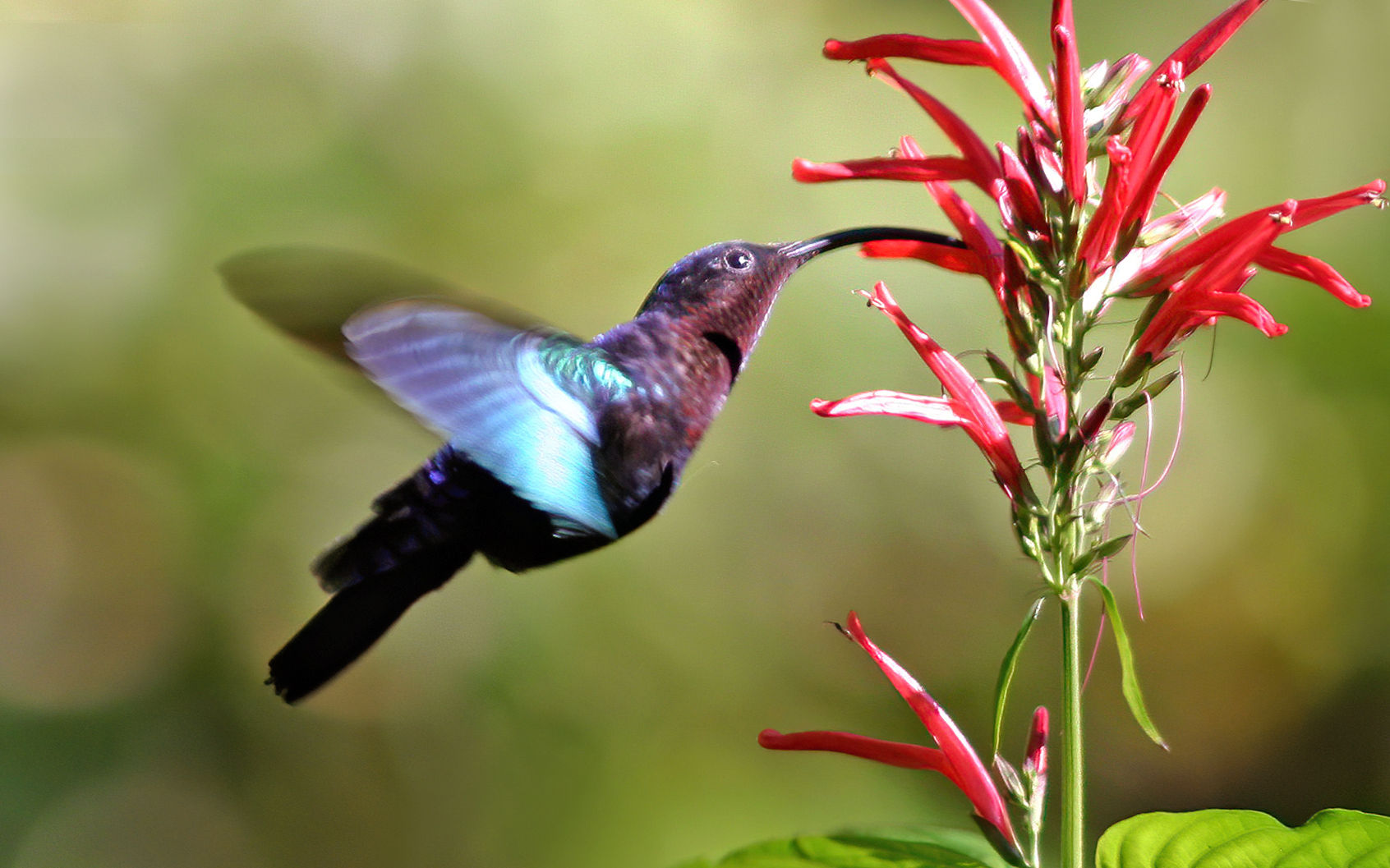
Purple-throated carib feeding at a flower

The 375 hummingbird species are specialized nectarivores coevolved with some 7,000 plant species and ornithophilous flowers. The first plant clade to coevolve with hummingbirds in the Americas is likely Heliconia, estimated to have occurred over 16 to 23 million years ago.

This coevolution implies that morphological traits of hummingbirds, such as bill length, bill curvature, and body mass, are correlated with morphological traits of plants, such as corolla length, curvature, and volume. Some species, especially those with unusual bill shapes, such as the sword-billed hummingbird and the sicklebills, are coevolved with a small number of flower species.

Even in the most specialized hummingbird–plant mutualisms, the number of food plant lineages of the individual hummingbird species increases with time. The bee hummingbird (Mellisuga helenae) – the world's smallest bird – evolved to dwarfism likely because it had to compete with long-billed hummingbirds having an advantage for nectar foraging from specialized flowers, consequently leading the bee hummingbird to more successfully compete for flower foraging against insects.

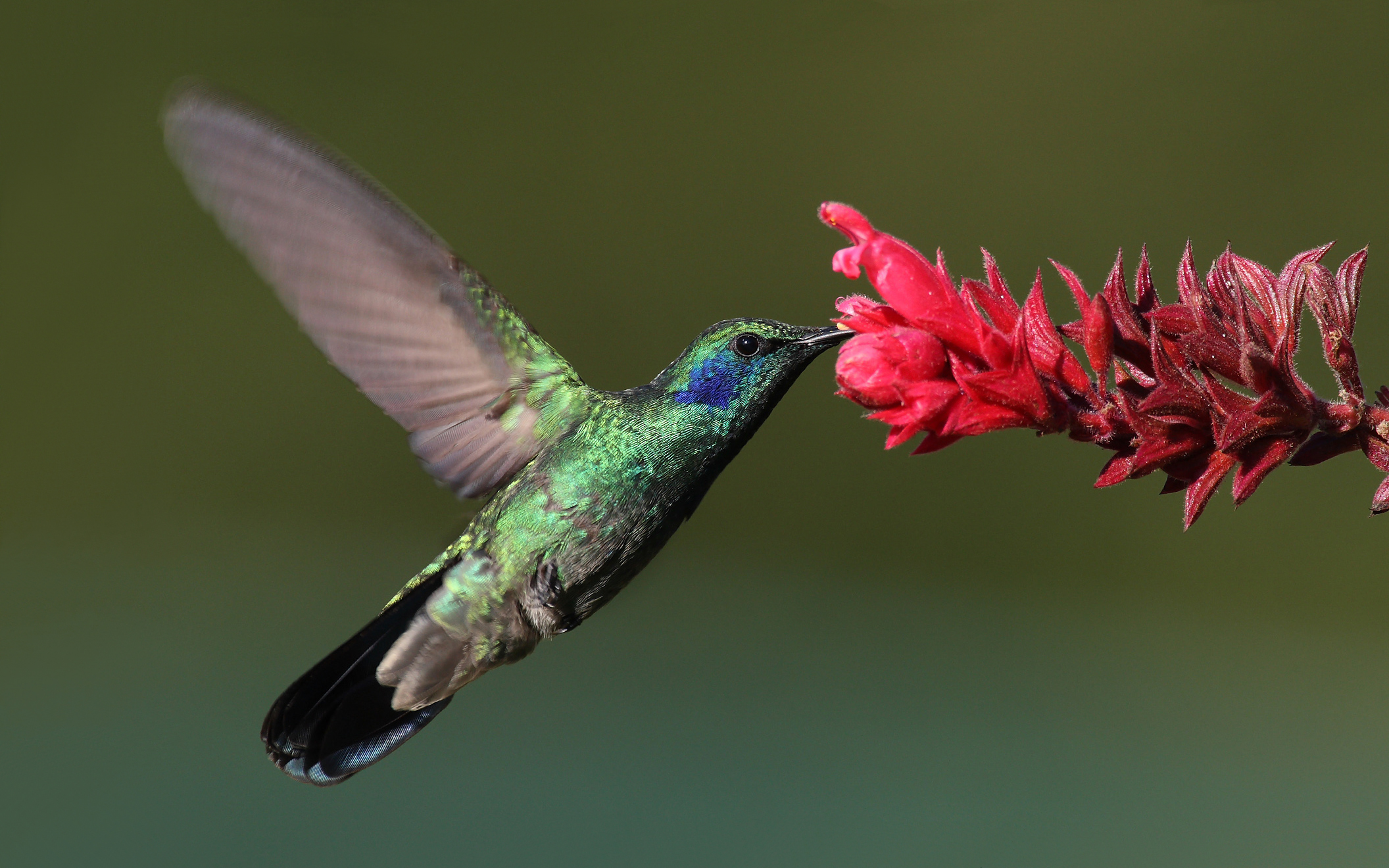
Lesser violetear at a flower

==== Coevolution "syndrome" ====
Hummingbirds and the plants they visit for nectar have a tight coevolutionary association, generally called a plant–bird syndrome or mutualistic network. By collecting pollen on their beaks while foraging from flowers, hummingbirds contribute to flower species diversification and morphology adaptations – hummingbirds prefer bright red, yellow, or purple flowers having no scent or landing platform, and with long corolla tubes containing copious nectar, characteristics unfavorable to insect pollinators.

Hummingbirds can see wavelengths into the near-ultraviolet, but hummingbird-pollinated flowers do not reflect these wavelengths as many insect-pollinated flowers do. This narrow color spectrum may render hummingbird-pollinated flowers relatively inconspicuous to most insects, thereby reducing nectar robbing. Hummingbird-pollinated flowers also produce relatively weak nectar (averaging 25% sugars) containing a high proportion of sucrose, whereas insect-pollinated flowers typically produce more concentrated nectars dominated by fructose and glucose.

Hummingbirds show high specialization and modularity, especially in communities with high species richness. These associations are also observed when closely related hummingbirds, such as two species of the same genus, visit distinct sets of flowering species.

== Sexual dimorphisms ==
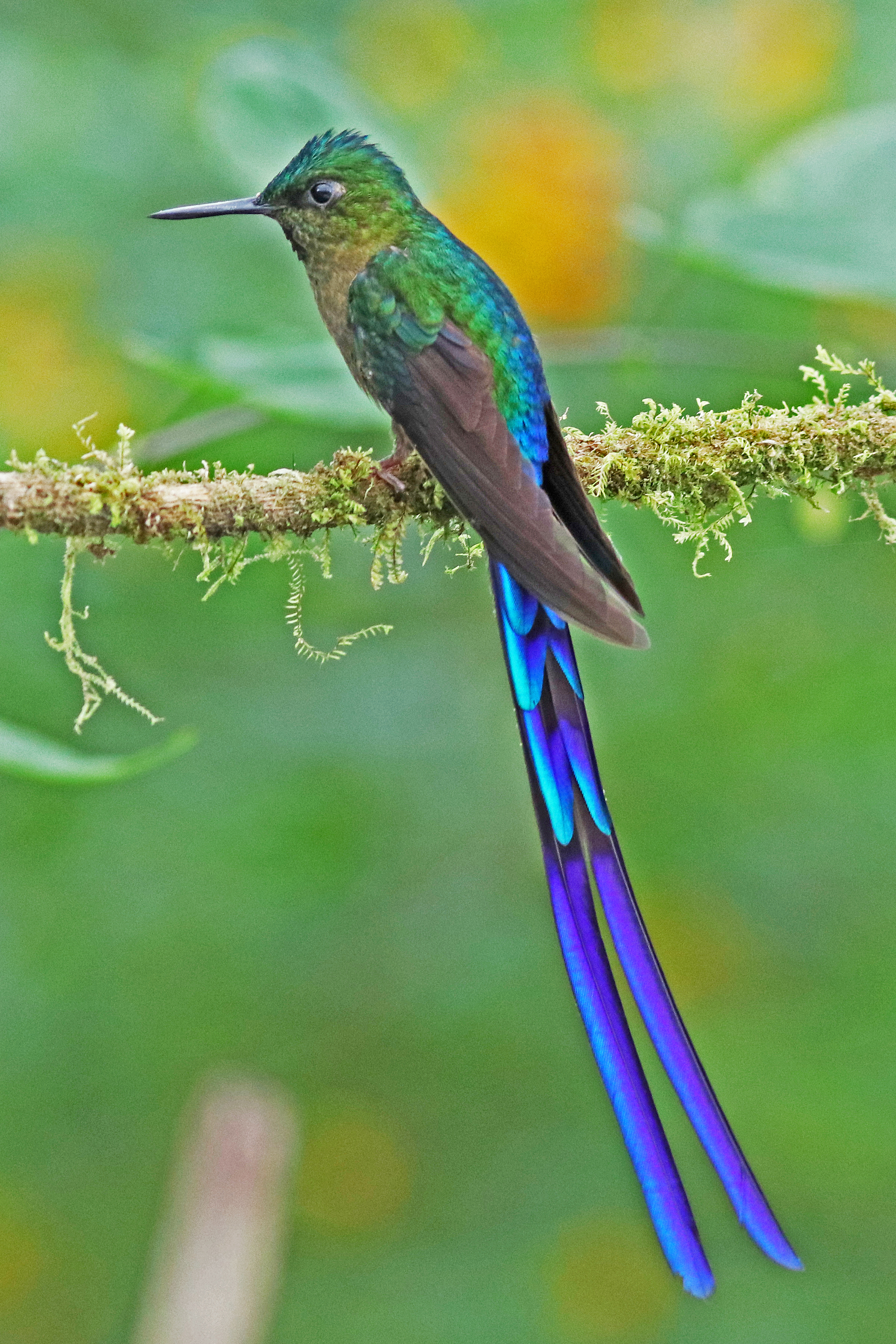
Male

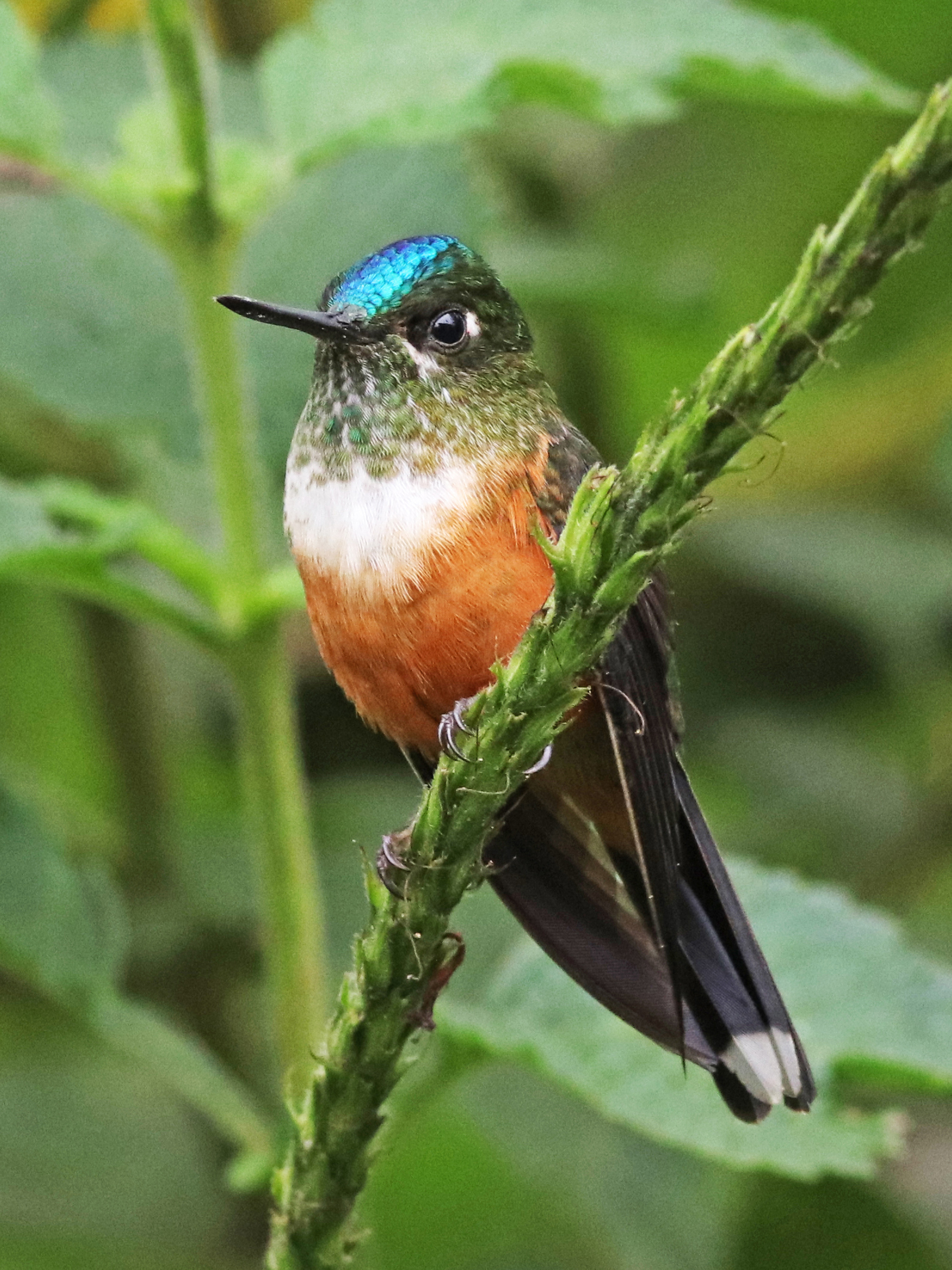
Female

Sexual dimorphism in violet-tailed sylph

Hummingbirds exhibit sexual size dimorphism according to Rensch's rule, in which males are smaller than females in small-bodied species, and males are larger than females in large-bodied species. The extent of this sexual size difference varies among clades of hummingbirds. For example, the Mellisugini clade (bees) exhibits a large size dimorphism, with females being larger than males. Conversely, the Lesbiini clade (coquettes) displays very little size dimorphism; males and females are similar in size. Sexual dimorphisms in bill size and shape are also present between male and female hummingbirds, where in many clades, females have longer, more curved bills favored for accessing nectar from tall flowers. For males and females of the same size, females tend to have larger bills.

Sexual size and bill differences likely evolved due to constraints imposed by courtship, because mating displays of male hummingbirds require complex aerial maneuvers. Males tend to be smaller than females, allowing conservation of energy to forage competitively and participate more frequently in courtship. Thus, sexual selection favors smaller male hummingbirds.

Female hummingbirds tend to be larger, requiring more energy, with longer beaks that allow for more effective reach into crevices of tall flowers for nectar. Thus, females are better at foraging, acquiring flower nectar, and supporting the energy demands of their larger body size. Directional selection thus favors the larger hummingbirds in terms of acquiring food.

Another evolutionary cause of this sexual bill dimorphism is that the selective forces from competition for nectar between the sexes of each species drives sexual dimorphism. Depending on which sex holds territory in the species, the other sex having a longer bill and being able to feed on a wide variety of flowers is advantageous, decreasing intraspecific competition. For example, in species of hummingbirds where males have longer bills, males do not hold a specific territory and have a lek mating system. In species where males have shorter bills than females, males defend their resources, so females benefit from a longer bill to feed from a broader range of flowers.

=== Feather colors ===
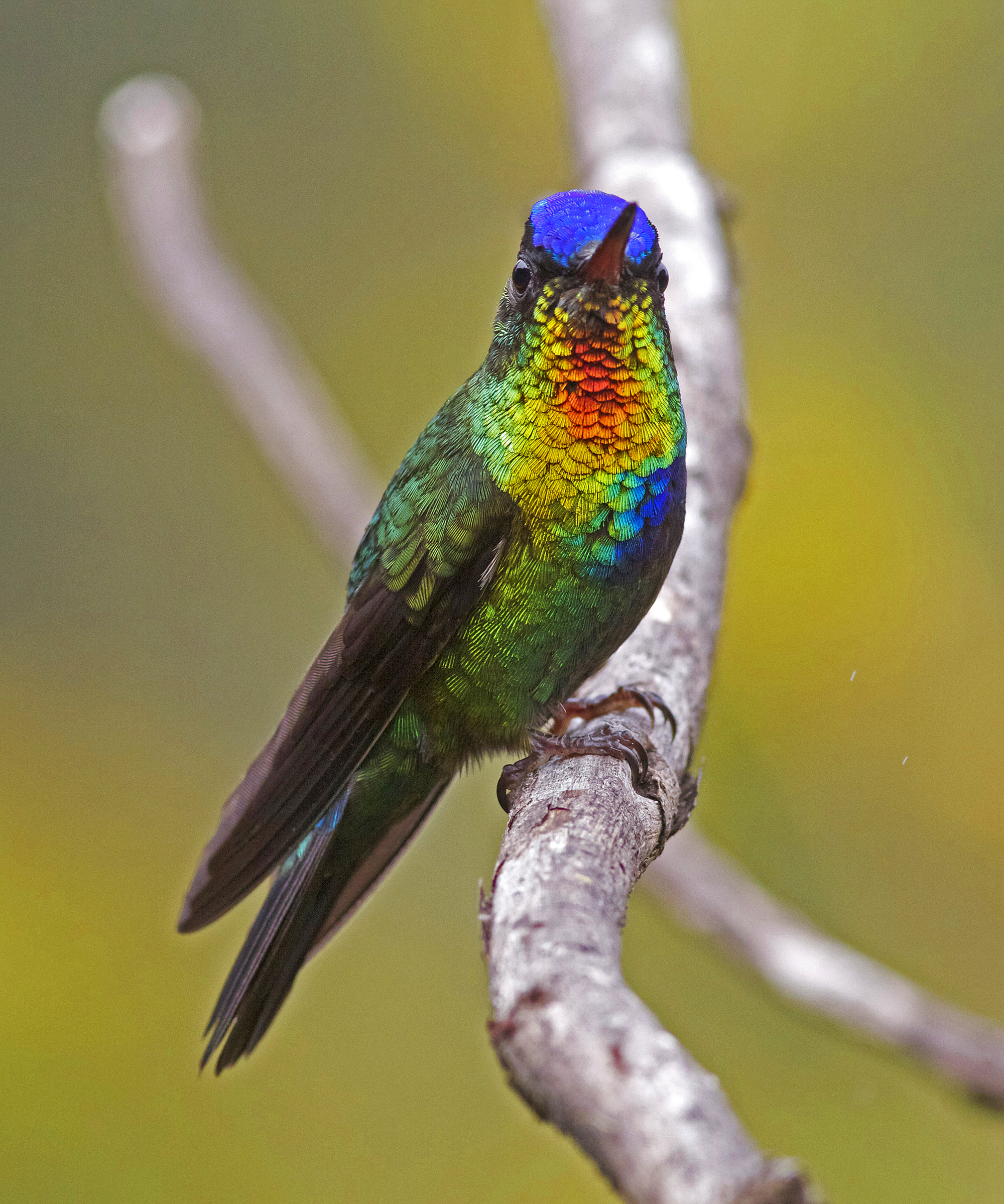
Male fiery-throated hummingbird showing iridescent crown and gorget feathers; Costa Rica

The hummingbird plumage coloration gamut, particularly for blue, green, and purple colors in the gorget and crown of males, occupies 34% of the total color space for bird feathers. White (unpigmented) feathers have the lowest incidence in the hummingbird color gamut. Hummingbird plumage color diversity evolved from sexual and social selection on plumage coloration, which correlates with the rate of hummingbird species development over millions of years. Bright plumage colors in males are part of aggressive competition for flower resources and mating. The bright colors result from pigmentation in the feathers and from prismal cells within the top layers of feathers of the head, gorget, breast, back and wings. When sunlight hits these cells, it is split into wavelengths that reflect to the observer in varying degrees of intensity, with the feather structure acting as a diffraction grating. Iridescent hummingbird colors result from a combination of refraction and pigmentation, since the diffraction structures themselves are made of melanin, a pigment, and may also be colored by carotenoid pigmentation and more subdued black, brown or gray colors dependent on melanin.

By merely shifting position, feather regions of a muted-looking bird can instantly become fiery red or vivid green. In courtship displays for one example, males of the colorful Anna's hummingbird orient their bodies and feathers toward the sun to enhance the display value of iridescent plumage toward a female of interest.

One study of Anna's hummingbirds found that dietary protein was an influential factor in feather color, as birds receiving more protein grew significantly more colorful crown feathers than those fed a low-protein diet. Additionally, birds on a high-protein diet grew yellower (higher hue) green tail feathers than birds on a low-protein diet.

== Specialized characteristics and metabolism ==
=== Humming ===
A calliope hummingbird hovering near a feeder, creating the "humming" sound from its rapid wingbeats, while chirping by vocalization

Hummingbirds are named for the prominent humming sound their wingbeats make while flying and hovering to feed or interact with other hummingbirds. Humming serves communication purposes by alerting other birds of the arrival of a fellow forager or potential mate. The humming sound derives from aerodynamic forces generated by the downstrokes and upstrokes of the rapid wingbeats, causing oscillations and harmonics that evoke an acoustic quality likened to that of a musical instrument. The humming sound of hummingbirds is unique among flying animals, compared to the whine of mosquitoes, buzz of bees, and "whoosh" of larger birds.

The wingbeats causing the hum of hummingbirds during hovering are achieved by elastic recoil of wing strokes produced by the main flight muscles: the pectoralis major (the main downstroke muscle) and supracoracoideus (the main upstroke muscle).

=== Visual system ===
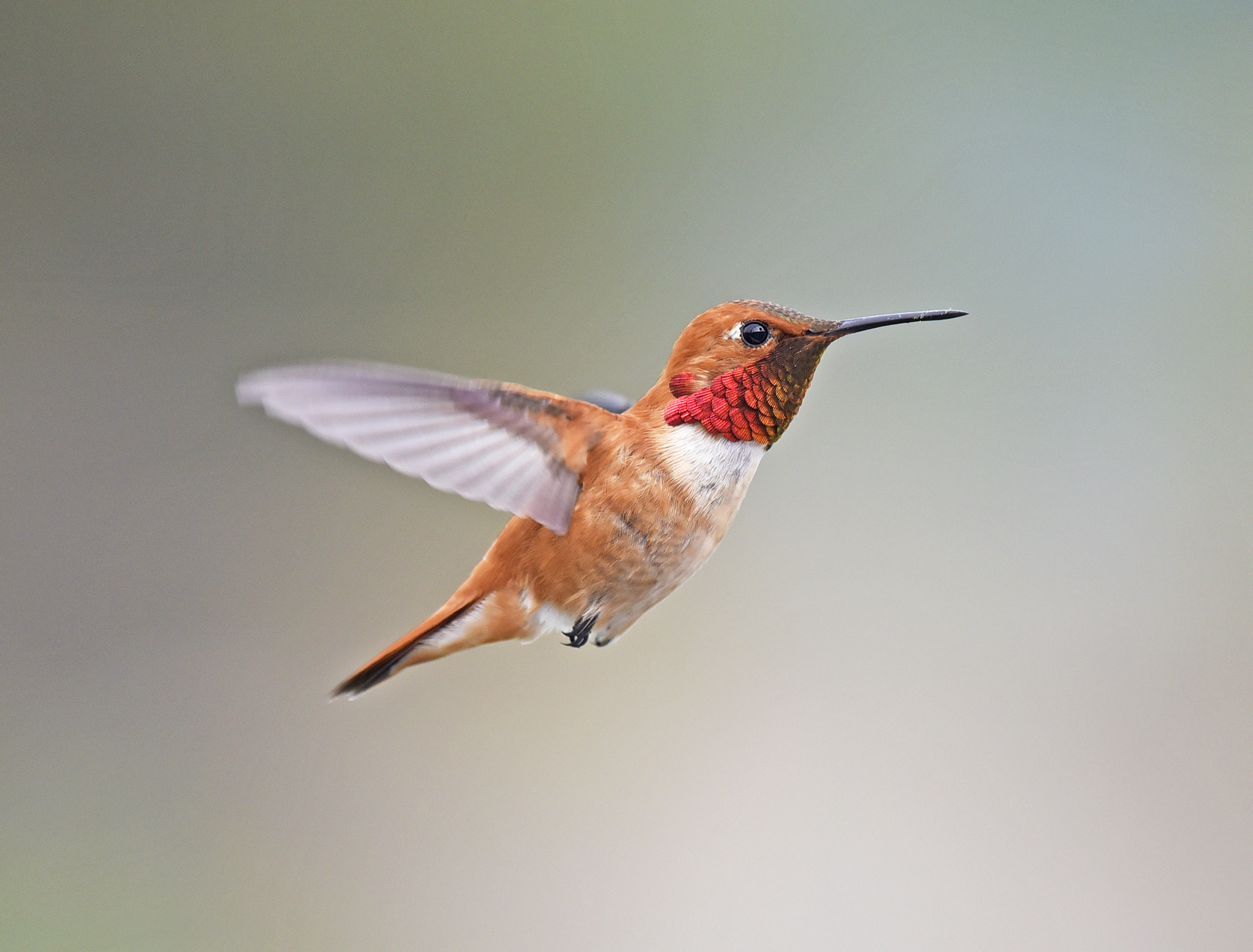
Male rufous hummingbird (Selasphorus rufus) displaying a proportionally large eye in relation to its head

Hummingbirds have visual properties typical of species that are both predatory and prey, a combination that enables them to capture insects and to hover at flowers for feeding, while simultaneously avoiding potential predators.

==== Anatomy ====
Hummingbirds have an upper and lower eyelid, and a nictitating membrane as a translucent "third" eyelid. Although hummingbird eyes are only 5–6 mm in diameter, they are accommodated in the skull by reduced skull ossification, and occupy a larger proportion of the skull compared to other birds and animals.

The iris of hummingbird eyes is dark brown, with a black pupil measuring 216 micrometres in diameter, and a wide, thin cornea. The enlarged cornea relative to total eye diameter serves to increase the amount of light perception by the eye when the pupil is dilated maximally, enabling nocturnal flight. The retina has an extraordinary density of ganglion cells responsible for visual processing, containing some 45,000 neurons per mm^{2}.

The prevalence of natural eye disease in a sample of Anna's and black-chinned hummingbirds was 2.3%.

==== Adaptations ====
During evolution, hummingbirds adapted to the navigational needs of visual processing while in rapid flight or hovering by development of an exceptionally dense array of retinal neurons, allowing for increased spatial resolution in the lateral and frontal visual fields. Morphological studies of the hummingbird brain showed that neuronal hypertrophy – relatively the largest in any bird – exists in a region called the pretectal nucleus lentiformis mesencephali (called the nucleus of the optic tract in mammals) responsible for refining dynamic visual processing while hovering and during rapid flight. The enlargement of the brain region responsible for visual processing indicates an enhanced ability for perception and processing of fast-moving visual stimuli encountered during rapid forward flight, insect foraging, competitive interactions, and high-speed courtship.

Hummingbirds are highly sensitive to stimuli in their visual fields, responding to even minimal motion in any direction by reorienting themselves in midflight. While in complex and dynamic natural environments, their visual sensitivity allows them to precisely hover in place – functions controlled by the lentiform nucleus, which is tuned to fast-pattern velocities enabling highly tuned control and collision avoidance during forward flight.

A study of broad-tailed hummingbirds indicated that hummingbirds have a fourth color-sensitive visual cone (humans have three) that detects ultraviolet light and enables discrimination of non-spectral colors, possibly having a role in flower identity, courtship displays, territorial defense, and predator evasion. The fourth color cone would extend the range of visible colors for hummingbirds to perceive ultraviolet light and color combinations of feathers and gorgets, colorful plants, and other objects in their environment, enabling detection of as many as five non-spectral colors, including purple, ultraviolet-red, ultraviolet-green, ultraviolet-yellow, and ultraviolet-purple.

=== Song, vocal learning, and hearing ===
Complex songs of male wedge-tailed sabrewing hummingbirds (Campylopterus curvipennis) in mating leks of eastern Mexico

Many hummingbird species exhibit a diverse vocal repertoire of chirps, squeaks, whistles and buzzes. Vocalizations vary in complexity and spectral content during social interactions, foraging, territorial defense, courtship, and mother-nestling communication. Territorial vocal signals may be produced in rapid succession to discourage aggressive encounters, with the chirping rate and loudness increasing when intruders persist. During the breeding season, male and female hummingbirds vocalize as part of courtship.

Hummingbirds exhibit vocal production learning to enable song variation – "dialects" that exist across the same species. For example, the blue-throated hummingbird's song differs from typical oscine songs in its wide frequency range, extending from 1.8 kHz to about 30 kHz. It also produces ultrasonic vocalizations which do not function in communication. As blue-throated hummingbirds often alternate singing with catching small flying insects, it is possible the ultrasonic clicks produced during singing disrupt insect flight patterns, making insects more vulnerable to predation. Anna's, Costa's, long-billed hermits, and Andean hummingbirds have song dialects that vary across habitat locations and phylogenetic clades.

Song of male Anna's hummingbird (Calypte anna)

The avian vocal organ, the syrinx, plays an important role in understanding hummingbird song production. What makes the hummingbird's syrinx different from that of other birds in the Apodiformes order is the presence of internal muscle structure, accessory cartilages, and a large tympanum that serves as an attachment point for external muscles, all of which are adaptations thought to be responsible for the hummingbird's increased ability in pitch control and large frequency range.

Hummingbird songs originate from at least seven specialized nuclei in the forebrain. A genetic expression study showed that these nuclei enable vocal learning (ability to acquire vocalizations through imitation), a rare trait known to occur in only two other groups of birds (parrots and songbirds) and a few groups of mammals (including humans, whales and dolphins, and bats). Within the past 66 million years, only hummingbirds, parrots, and songbirds out of 23 bird orders may have independently evolved seven similar forebrain structures for singing and vocal learning, indicating that evolution of these structures is under strong epigenetic constraints possibly derived from a common ancestor.

Generally, birds have been assessed to vocalize and hear in the range of 2–5 kHz, with hearing sensitivity falling with higher frequencies. In the Ecuadorian hillstar (Oreotrochilus chimborazo), vocalizations were recorded in the wild to be at a frequency above 10 kHz, well outside of the known hearing ability of most birds. Song system nuclei in the hummingbird brain are similar to those songbird brains, but the hummingbird brain has specialized regions involved for song processing.

=== Metabolism ===
Hummingbirds have the highest metabolism of all vertebrate animals – a necessity to support the rapid beating of their wings during hovering and fast forward flight. During flight and hovering, oxygen consumption per gram of muscle tissue in a hummingbird is about 10 times higher than that measured in elite human athletes. Hummingbirds achieve this capacity for oxygen consumption by a high density and proximity of capillaries and mitochondria in their flight muscles.

Hummingbirds are rare among vertebrates in their ability to rapidly make use of ingested sugars to fuel energetically expensive hovering flight, powering up to 100% of their metabolic needs with the sugars they drink. Hummingbird flight muscles have extremely high capacities for oxidizing carbohydrates and fatty acids via hexokinase, carnitine palmitoyltransferase, and citrate synthase enzymes at rates that are the highest known for vertebrate skeletal muscle. To sustain rapid wingbeats during flight and hovering, hummingbirds expend the human equivalent of 150,000 calories per day, an amount estimated to be 10 times the energy consumption by a marathon runner in competition.

Hummingbirds can use newly ingested sugars to fuel hovering flight within 30–45 minutes of consumption. These data suggest that hummingbirds are able to oxidize sugar in flight muscles at rates rapid enough to satisfy their extreme metabolic demands – as indicated by a 2017 review showing that hummingbirds have in their flight muscles a mechanism for "direct oxidation" of sugars into maximal ATP yield to support a high metabolic rate for hovering, foraging at altitude, and migrating. This adaptation occurred through the evolutionary loss of a key gene, fructose-bisphosphatase 2 (FBP2), coinciding with the onset of hovering by hummingbirds estimated by fossil evidence to be some 35 million years ago. Without FBP2, glycolysis and mitochondrial respiration in flight muscles are enhanced, enabling hummingbirds to metabolize sugar more efficiently for energy.

By relying on newly ingested sugars to fuel flight, hummingbirds reserve their limited fat stores to sustain their overnight fasting during torpor or to power migratory flights. Studies of hummingbird metabolism address how a migrating ruby-throated hummingbird can cross 800 km (500 mi) of the Gulf of Mexico on a nonstop flight. This hummingbird, like other long-distance migrating birds, stores fat as a fuel reserve, augmenting its weight by as much as 100%, then enabling metabolic fuel for flying over open water. The amount of fat (1–2 g) used by a migrating hummingbird to cross the Gulf of Mexico in a single flight is similar to that used by a human climbing about 50 feet (15 m).

The heart rate of hummingbirds can reach as high as 1,260 beats per minute, a rate measured in a blue-throated hummingbird with a breathing rate of 250 breaths per minute at rest.

=== Heat dissipation ===
The high metabolic rate of hummingbirds – especially during rapid forward flight and hovering – produces increased body heat that requires specialized mechanisms of thermoregulation for heat dissipation, which becomes an even greater challenge in hot, humid climates. Hummingbirds dissipate heat partially by evaporation through exhaled air, and from body structures with thin or no feather covering, such as around the eyes, shoulders, under the wings (patagia), and feet.

While hovering, hummingbirds do not benefit from the heat loss by air convection during forward flight, except for air movement generated by their rapid wing-beat, possibly aiding convective heat loss from the extended feet. Smaller hummingbird species, such as the calliope, appear to adapt their relatively higher surface-to-volume ratio to improve convective cooling from air movement by the wings. When air temperatures rise above 36 °C (97 °F), thermal gradients driving heat passively by convective dissipation from around the eyes, shoulders, and feet are reduced or eliminated, requiring heat dissipation mainly by evaporation and exhalation. In cold climates, hummingbirds retract their feet into breast feathers to eliminate skin exposure and minimize heat dissipation.

=== Kidney function ===
The dynamic range of metabolic rates in hummingbirds requires a parallel dynamic range in kidney function. During a day of nectar consumption with a corresponding high water intake that may total five times the body weight per day, hummingbird kidneys process water via glomerular filtration rates (GFR) in amounts proportional to water consumption, thereby avoiding overhydration. During brief periods of water deprivation, however, such as in nighttime torpor, GFR drops to zero, preserving body water.

Hummingbird kidneys also have a unique ability to control the levels of electrolytes after consuming nectars with high amounts of sodium and chloride or none, indicating that kidney and glomerular structures must be highly specialized for variations in nectar mineral quality. Morphological studies on Anna's hummingbird kidneys showed adaptations of high capillary density in close proximity to nephrons, allowing for precise regulation of water and electrolytes.

=== Hemoglobin adaptation to altitude ===
Dozens of hummingbird species live year-round in tropical mountain habitats at high altitudes, such as in the Andes over ranges of 1,500 metres (4,900 ft) to 5,200 metres (17,100 ft) where the partial pressure of oxygen in the air is reduced, a condition of hypoxic challenge for the high metabolic demands of hummingbirds. In Andean hummingbirds living at high elevations, researchers found that the oxygen-carrying protein in blood – hemoglobin – had increased oxygen-binding affinity, and that this adaptive effect likely resulted from evolutionary mutations within the hemoglobin molecule via specific amino acid changes due to natural selection.

=== Adaptation to winter ===
Anna's hummingbirds are the northernmost year-round residents of any hummingbird. Anna's hummingbirds were recorded in Alaska as early as 1971, and resident in the Pacific Northwest since the 1960s, particularly increasing as a year-round population during the early 21st century. Scientists estimate that some Anna's hummingbirds overwinter and presumably breed at northern latitudes where food and shelter are available throughout winter, tolerating moderately cold winter temperatures.

During cold temperatures, Anna's hummingbirds gradually gain weight during the day as they convert sugar to fat. In addition, hummingbirds with inadequate stores of body fat or insufficient plumage are able to survive periods of subfreezing weather by lowering their metabolic rate and entering a state of torpor.

While their range was originally limited to the chaparral of California and Baja California, it expanded northward to Oregon, Washington, and British Columbia, and east to Arizona over the 1960s to 1970s. This rapid expansion is attributed to the widespread planting of non-native species, such as eucalyptus, as well as the use of urban bird feeders, in combination with the species' natural tendency for extensive postbreeding dispersal. In the Pacific Northwest, the fastest growing populations occur in regions with breeding-season cold temperatures similar to those of its native range. Northward expansion of the Anna's hummingbird represents an ecological release associated with introduced plants, year-round nectar availability from feeders supplied by humans, milder winter temperatures associated with climate change, and acclimation of the species to a winter climate cooler than its native region. Although quantitative data are absent, it is likely that a sizable percentage of Anna's hummingbirds in the Pacific Northwest still do migrate south for winter, as of 2017.

Anna's hummingbird is the official city bird of Vancouver, British Columbia, Canada, and is a non-migrating resident of Seattle where it lives year-round through winter enduring extended periods of subfreezing temperatures, snow, and high winds.

=== Torpor ===
The metabolism of hummingbirds can slow at night or at any time when food is not readily available; the birds enter a deep-sleep state (known as torpor) to prevent energy reserves from falling to a critical level. One study of broad-tailed hummingbirds found that body weight decreased linearly throughout torpor at a rate of 0.04 g per hour.

During nighttime torpor, body temperature in a Caribbean hummingbird was shown to fall from 40 to 18 °C, with heart and breathing rates slowing dramatically (heart rate of roughly 50 to 180 bpm from its daytime rate of higher than 1000 bpm). Recordings from a Metallura phoebe hummingbird in nocturnal torpor at around 3,800 metres (12,500 ft) in the Andes mountains showed that body temperature fell to 3.3 °C (38 °F), the lowest known level for a bird or non-hibernating mammal. During cold nights at altitude, hummingbirds were in torpor for 2–13 hours depending on species, with cooling occurring at the rate of 0.6 °C per minute and rewarming at 1–1.5 °C per minute. High-altitude Andean hummingbirds also lost body weight in negative proportion to how long the birds were in torpor, losing about 6% of weight each night.

During torpor, to prevent dehydration, the kidney function declines, preserving needed compounds, such as glucose, water, and nutrients. The circulating hormone, corticosterone, is one signal that arouses a hummingbird from torpor.

Use and duration of torpor vary among hummingbird species and are affected by whether a dominant bird defends territory, with nonterritorial subordinate birds having longer periods of torpor. A hummingbird with a higher fat percentage will be less likely to enter a state of torpor compared to one with less fat, as a bird can use the energy from its fat stores. Torpor in hummingbirds appears to be unrelated to nighttime temperature, as it occurs across a wide temperature range, with energy savings of such deep sleep being more related to the photoperiod and duration of torpor.

=== Lifespan ===
Hummingbirds have unusually long lifespans for organisms with such rapid metabolisms. Though many die during their first year of life, especially in the vulnerable period between hatching and fledging, those that survive may occasionally live a decade or more. Among the better-known North American species, the typical lifespan is probably 3 to 5 years. For comparison, the smaller shrews, among the smallest of all mammals, seldom live longer than 2 years. The longest recorded lifespan in the wild relates to a female broad-tailed hummingbird that was banded as an adult at least one year old, then recaptured 11 years later, making her at least 12 years old. Other longevity records for banded hummingbirds include an estimated minimum age of 10 years 1 month for a female black-chinned hummingbird similar in size to the broad-tailed hummingbird, and at least 11 years 2 months for a much larger buff-bellied hummingbird.

== Natural mortality ==
Cold weather is likely the most common cause of hummingbird deaths, with human activities having mortality effects via habitat depletion, pesticide use, and collisions with building windows and vehicles.

=== Predators ===
Where present, domestic cats are a common predator of non-nested hummingbirds. Praying mantises have been observed as predators. Other predators include dragonflies, frogs, orb-weaver spiders, predatory birds, such as sharp-shinned hawks, roadrunners, and American kestrels, and snakes.

=== Parasites ===
Hummingbirds host a highly specialized lice fauna. Two genera of Ricinid lice, Trochiloecetes and Trochiliphagus, are specialized on them, infesting about 14% in one study of 22 species. In contrast, two genera of Menoponid lice, Myrsidea and Leremenopon, are rare on them.

== Reproduction ==
Video of a hummingbird building a nest

Male hummingbirds do not take part in nesting. Most species build a cup-shaped nest on the branch of a tree or shrub. The nest varies in size relative to the particular species – from smaller than half a walnut shell to several centimeters in diameter.

Many hummingbird species use spider silk and lichen to bind the nest material together and secure the structure. The unique properties of the silk allow the nest to expand as the young hummingbirds grow. Two white eggs are laid, which despite being the smallest of all bird eggs, are large relative to the adult hummingbird's size. Incubation lasts 14 to 23 days, depending on the species, ambient temperature, and female attentiveness to the nest. The mother feeds her nestlings on small arthropods and nectar by inserting her bill into the open mouth of a nestling, and then regurgitating the food into its crop. Hummingbirds stay in the nest for 18–22 days, after which they leave the nest to forage on their own, although the mother bird may continue feeding them for another 25 days.

== Flight ==
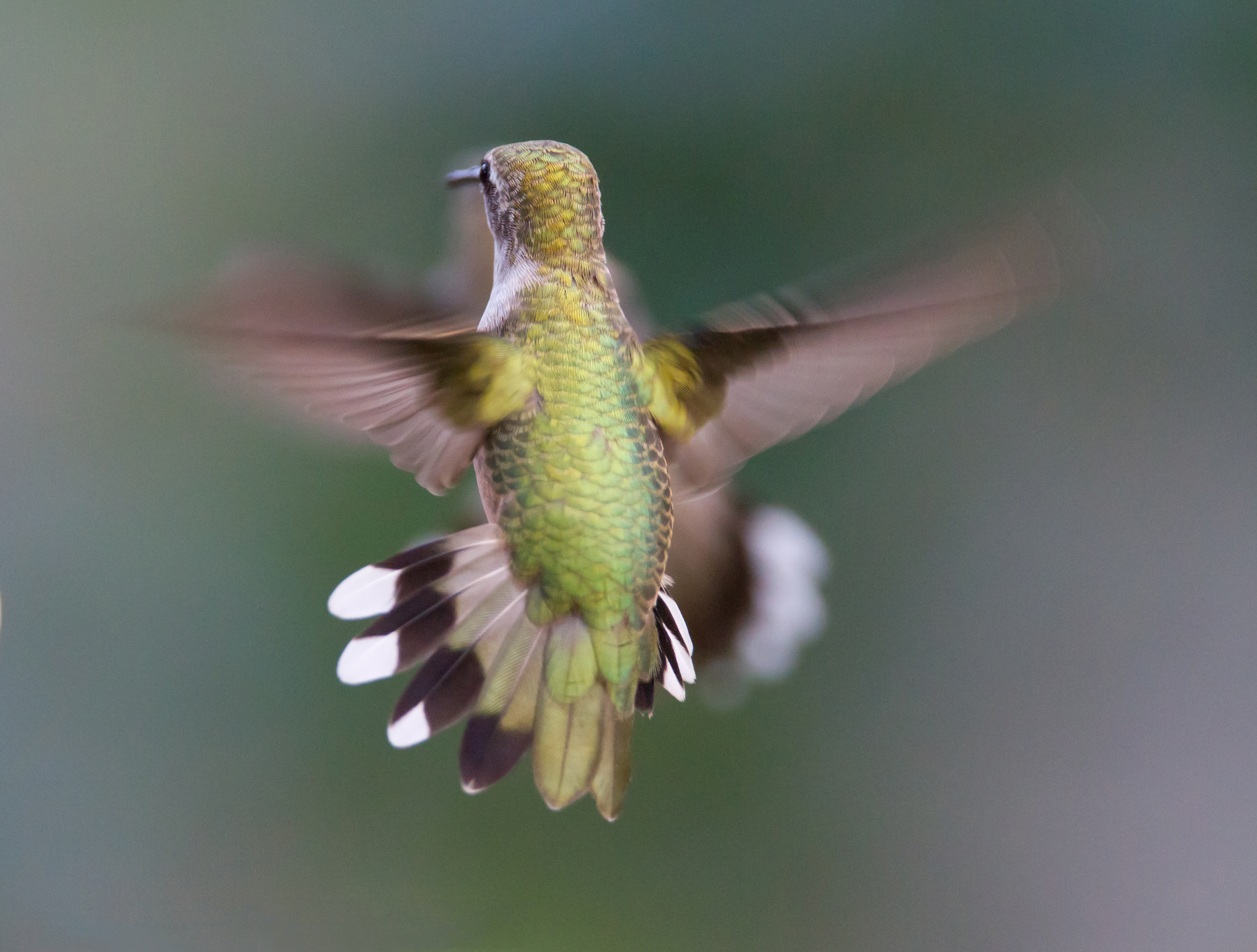
A female ruby-throated hummingbird hovering in mid-air

Hummingbird flight has been studied intensively from an aerodynamic perspective using wind tunnels and high-speed video cameras. Two studies of rufous or Anna's hummingbirds in a wind tunnel used particle image velocimetry techniques to investigate the lift generated on the bird's upstroke and downstroke. The birds produced 75% of their weight support during the downstroke and 25% during the upstroke, with the wings making a "figure 8" motion.

Hummingbirds generate a trail of wake vortices under each wing while hovering.

Many earlier studies had assumed that lift was generated equally during the two phases of the wingbeat cycle, as is the case of insects of a similar size. This finding shows that hummingbird hovering is similar to, but distinct from, that of hovering insects such as the hawk moth. Further studies using electromyography in hovering rufous hummingbirds showed that muscle strain in the pectoralis major (principal downstroke muscle) was the lowest yet recorded in a flying bird, and the primary upstroke muscle (supracoracoideus) is proportionately larger than in other bird species. Presumably due to rapid wingbeats for flight and hovering, hummingbird wings have adapted to perform without an alula.

The giant hummingbird's wings beat as few as 12 times per second, and the wings of typical hummingbirds beat up to 80 times per second. As air density decreases, for example, at higher altitudes, the amount of power a hummingbird must use to hover increases. Hummingbird species adapted for life at higher altitudes, therefore, have larger wings to help offset these negative effects of low air density on lift generation.

A slow-motion video has shown how the hummingbirds deal with rain when they are flying. To remove the water from their heads, they shake their heads and bodies, similar to a dog shaking, to shed water. Further, when raindrops collectively may weigh as much as 38% of the bird's body weight, hummingbirds shift their bodies and tails horizontally, beat their wings faster, and reduce their wings' angle of motion when flying in heavy rain.

=== Wingbeats and flight stability ===
Slow-motion video of hummingbirds feeding

The highest recorded wingbeat rate for hummingbirds during hovering is 99.1 per second, as measured for male woodstars (Chaetocercus sp.). Males in the genus Chaetocercus have been recorded above 100 beats per second during courtship displays. The number of beats per second increases above "normal" hovering while flying during courtship displays (up to 90 per second for the calliope hummingbird, Selasphorus calliope); a wingbeat rate 40% higher than its typical hovering rate.

During turbulent airflow conditions created experimentally in a wind tunnel, hummingbirds exhibit stable head positions and orientation when they hover at a feeder. When wind gusts from the side, hummingbirds compensate by increasing wing-stroke amplitude and stroke plane angle and by varying these parameters asymmetrically between the wings and from one stroke to the next. They also vary the orientation and enlarge the collective surface area of their tail feathers into the shape of a fan. While hovering, the visual system of a hummingbird is able to separate apparent motion caused by the movement of the hummingbird itself from motions caused by external sources, such as an approaching predator. In natural settings full of highly complex background motion, hummingbirds are able to precisely hover in place by rapid coordination of vision with body position.

== Feather sounds ==
=== Courtship dives ===
When courting, the male Anna's hummingbird ascends some 35 m (115 ft) above a female, before diving at a speed of 27 m/s (89 ft/s), equal to 385 body lengths/sec – producing a high-pitched sound near the female at the nadir of the dive. This downward acceleration during a dive is the highest reported for any vertebrate undergoing a voluntary aerial maneuver; in addition to acceleration, the speed relative to body length is the highest known for any vertebrate. For instance, it is about twice the diving speed of peregrine falcons in pursuit of prey. At maximum descent speed, about 10 g of gravitational force occur in the courting hummingbird during a dive (Note: G-force is generated as the bird pulls out of the dive). (Note: By comparison to humans, this is a G-force acceleration well beyond the threshold of causing near loss of consciousness (occurring at about +5 Gz) in fighter pilots during operation of a fixed-wing aircraft in a high-speed banked turn.)

The outer tail feathers of male Anna's (Calypte anna) and Selasphorus hummingbirds (e.g., Allen's, calliope) vibrate during courtship display dives and produce an audible chirp caused by aeroelastic flutter. Hummingbirds cannot make the courtship dive sound when missing their outer tail feathers, and those same feathers could produce the dive sound in a wind tunnel. The bird can sing at the same frequency as the tail-feather chirp, but its small syrinx is not capable of the same volume. The sound is caused by the aerodynamics of rapid air flow past tail feathers, causing them to flutter in a vibration, which produces the high-pitched sound of a courtship dive.

Many other species of hummingbirds also produce sounds with their wings or tails while flying, hovering, or diving, including the wings of the calliope hummingbird, broad-tailed hummingbird, rufous hummingbird, Allen's hummingbird, and the streamertail species, as well as the tail of the Costa's hummingbird and the black-chinned hummingbird, and a number of related species. The harmonics of sounds during courtship dives vary across species of hummingbirds.

=== Wing feather trill ===
Male rufous and broad-tailed hummingbirds (genus Selasphorus) have a distinctive wing feature during normal flight that sounds like jingling or a buzzing shrill whistle – a trill. The trill arises from air rushing through slots created by the tapered tips of the ninth and tenth primary wing feathers, creating a sound loud enough to be detected by female or competitive male hummingbirds and researchers up to 100 m away.

Behaviorally, the trill serves several purposes: It announces the sex and presence of a male bird; it provides audible aggressive defense of a feeding territory and an intrusion tactic; it enhances communication of a threat; and it favors mate attraction and courtship.

== Migration ==
Relatively few hummingbirds migrate as a percentage of the total number of species; of the roughly 375 known hummingbird species, only 12–15 species migrate annually, particularly those in North America. Most hummingbirds live in the Amazonia-Central America tropical rainforest belt, where seasonal temperature changes and food sources are relatively constant, obviating the need to migrate. As the smallest living birds, hummingbirds are relatively limited at conserving heat energy, and are generally unable to maintain a presence in higher latitudes during winter months, unless the specific location has a large food supply throughout the year, particularly access to flower nectar. Other migration factors are seasonal fluctuation of food, climate, competition for resources, predators, and inherent signals.

=== South America ===
The two species of giant hummingbird – the southern giant hummingbird (Patagona gigas, Gray, 1840), and northern giant hummingbird (Patagonia peruviana, Boucard, 1893) – have diverged into migrants undergoing adaptation from sea level to extreme mountain elevations, and others residing at exceptional elevations (4,300 m (14,100 ft) in Peru), possibly representing a new species, Patagona chaski sp. nov. (named in 2024). The range of the southern species crosses the Central Andean Plateau, moving from sea level up to 4,400 m (14,400 ft) altitude in the Andes. Tracked by satellite transmitters and geolocators, their seasonal migration courses in a loop over 8,335 km (5,179 mi) of total distance traveled between Chile and Ecuador. In 1834, Charles Darwin recorded their arrival in spring from the "parched deserts of the north", apparently referring to the Atacama Desert of northern Chile.

=== North America ===
Most North American hummingbirds migrate southward in fall to spend winter in Mexico, the Caribbean Islands, or Central America. A few species are year-round residents of Florida, California, and the southwestern desert regions of the US. Among these are Anna's hummingbird, a common resident from southern Arizona and inland California, and the buff-bellied hummingbird, a winter resident from Florida across the Gulf Coast to South Texas. Ruby-throated hummingbirds are common along the Atlantic flyway, and migrate in summer from as far north as Atlantic Canada, returning to Mexico, South America, southern Texas, and Florida to winter. During winter in southern Louisiana, black-chinned, buff-bellied, calliope, Allen's, Anna's, ruby-throated, rufous, broad-tailed, and broad-billed hummingbirds are present.

The rufous hummingbird breeds farther north than any other species of hummingbird, spending summers along coastal British Columbia and Alaska, and wintering in the southwestern United States and Mexico, with some distributed along the coasts of the subtropical Gulf of Mexico and Florida. By migrating in spring as far north as the Yukon or southern Alaska, the rufous hummingbird migrates more extensively and nests farther north than any other hummingbird species, and must tolerate occasional temperatures below freezing in its breeding territory. This cold hardiness enables it to survive temperatures below freezing, provided that adequate shelter and food are available.

As calculated by displacement of body size, the rufous hummingbird makes perhaps the longest migratory journey of any bird in the world. At just over 3 inches (7.6 cm) long, rufous hummingbirds travel 3,900 miles (6,300 km) one-way from Alaska to Mexico in late summer, a distance equal to 78,470,000 body lengths, then make the return journey in the following spring. By comparison, the 13 inches (33 cm)-long Arctic tern makes a one-way flight of about 18,000 kilometres (11,000 mi), or 51,430,000 body lengths, just 65% of the body displacement during migration by rufous hummingbirds.

The northward migration of rufous hummingbirds occurs along the Pacific flyway, and may be time-coordinated with flower and tree-leaf emergence in early spring, and also with availability of insects as food. Arrival at breeding grounds before nectar availability from mature flowers may jeopardize breeding opportunities.

== Feeding ==
Hummingbirds feeding; video recorded at 1,500 frames per second

Hummingbird visiting flowers in Copiapó, Chile: The apparent slow movement of hummingbird wings is a result of the stroboscopic effect.

Anna's hummingbird on Salvia

All hummingbirds are overwhelmingly nectarivorous, being by far the most specialized such feeders among birds, as well as the only birds for whom nectar typically comprises the vast majority of energy intake. Hummingbirds exhibit numerous and extensive adaptations to nectarivory, including long, probing bills and tongues which rapidly take up fluids. Hummingbirds also possess the most sophisticated flight of all birds – hovering, a necessity for rapidly visiting many flowers without perching. Their intestines are capable of extracting over 99% of the glucose from nectar feedings within minutes, owing to high densities of glucose transporters (the highest known among vertebrates).

As among the most important vertebrate pollinators, hummingbirds have coevolved in complex ways with flowering plants; thousands of New World species have evolved to be pollinated exclusively by hummingbirds, even barring access to insect pollinators. In some plants these mechanisms, which include highly modified corollas, even render their nectaries inaccessible to all but certain hummingbirds, i.e., those possessing appropriate beak morphologies (although some hummingbirds rob nectar to overcome this). Bird-pollinated plants (also termed "ornithophilous") were formerly thought to exemplify very close mutualisms, with specific flowering plants coevolving alongside specific hummingbirds in mutualistic pairings. Both ornithophilous plants and hummingbirds are now known to not be nearly selective enough for this to be true. Less accessible ornithophiles (for example, those requiring long bills) still rely on multiple hummingbird species for pollination. More importantly, hummingbirds tend not to be especially selective nectar-feeders, even regularly visiting non-ornithophilous plants, as well as ornithophiles which appear poorly suited for feeding by their species. Feeding efficiency is optimized, however, when birds feed on flowers better suited to their bill morphologies.

Although they may not be one-to-one, there are still marked overall preferences for certain genera, families, and orders of flowering plants by hummingbirds in general, as well as by certain species of hummingbird. Flowers which are attractive to hummingbirds are often colorful (particularly red), open diurnally, and produce nectar with a high sucrose content; in ornithophilous plants, the corollas are often elongated and tubular, and they may be scentless (several of these are adaptations discouraging insect visitation). Some common genera consumed by many species include Castilleja, Centropogon, Costus, Delphinium, Heliconia, Hibiscus, Inga, and Mimulus; some of these are primarily insect-pollinated. Three Californian species were found to feed from 62 plant families in 30 orders, with the most frequently occurring orders being Apiales, Fabales, Lamiales, and Rosales. A hummingbird may have to visit one or two thousand flowers daily to meet energy demands.

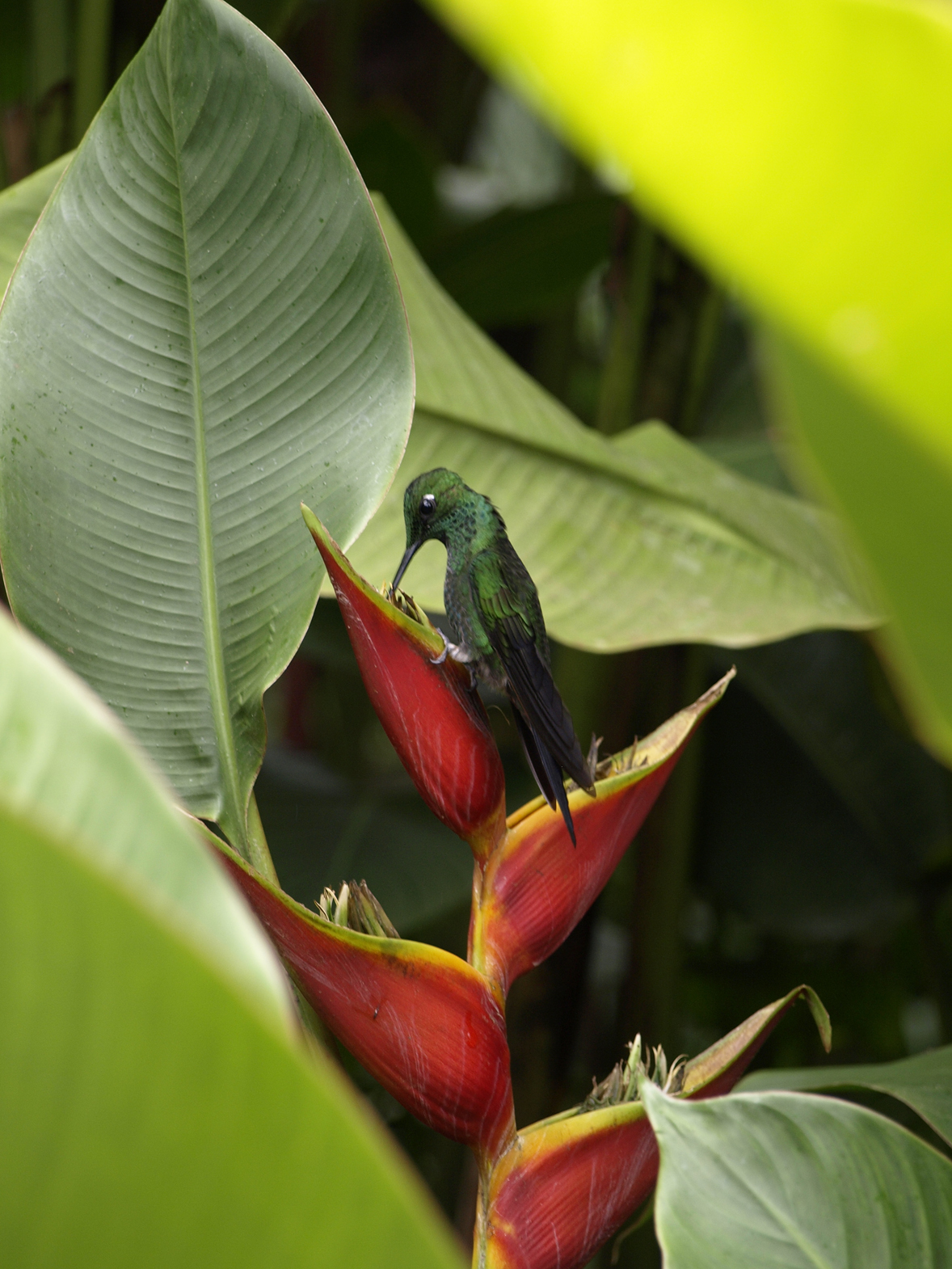
Heliconia species are popular nectar sources for many hummingbirds; here, a green-crowned brilliant (Heliodoxa jacula) visits Heliconia stricta

Although a high-quality source of energy, nectar is deficient in many macro- and micronutrients; it tends to be low in lipids, and although it may contain trace quantities of amino acids, some essential acids are severely or entirely lacking. Though hummingbird protein requirements appear to be quite small, at 1.5% of the diet, nectar is still an inadequate source; most if not all hummingbirds therefore supplement their diet with the consumption of invertebrates. Insectivory is not thought to be calorically important; nonetheless, regular consumption of arthropods is considered crucial for birds to thrive. In fact, it has been suggested that the majority of non-caloric nutritional needs of hummingbirds are met by insectivory, but nectars do contain appreciable quantities of certain vitamins and minerals. (Here, "insectivory" refers to the consumption of any arthropod, not exclusively insects).

Though not as insectivorous as once believed, and far less so than most of their relatives and ancestors among the Strisores (e.g., swifts), insectivory is probably of regular importance to most hummingbirds. About 95% of individuals from 140 species in one study showed evidence of arthropod consumption, while another study found arthropod remains in 79% of over 1600 birds from sites across South and Central America. Some species have even been recorded to be largely or entirely insectivorous for periods of time, particularly when nectar sources are scarce, and possibly, for some species, with seasonal regularity in areas with a wet season. Observations of seasonal, near-exclusive insectivory have been made for blue-throated hummingbirds, as well as swallow-tailed hummingbirds in an urban park in Brazil. In Arizona, when nearby nectar sources were seemingly absent, a nesting female broad-tailed hummingbird was recorded feeding only on arthropods for two weeks. Other studies report 70–100% of feeding time devoted to arthropods; these accounts suggest a degree of adaptability, particularly when appropriate nectar sources are unavailable, although nectarivory always predominates when flowers are abundant (e.g., in non-seasonal tropical habitats). In addition, the aforementioned Arizona study only surveyed a small portion of the study area, and mostly did not observe the bird while she was off the nest. Similar concerns have been raised for other reports, leading to skepticism over whether hummingbirds can in fact subsist without nectar for extended periods at all.

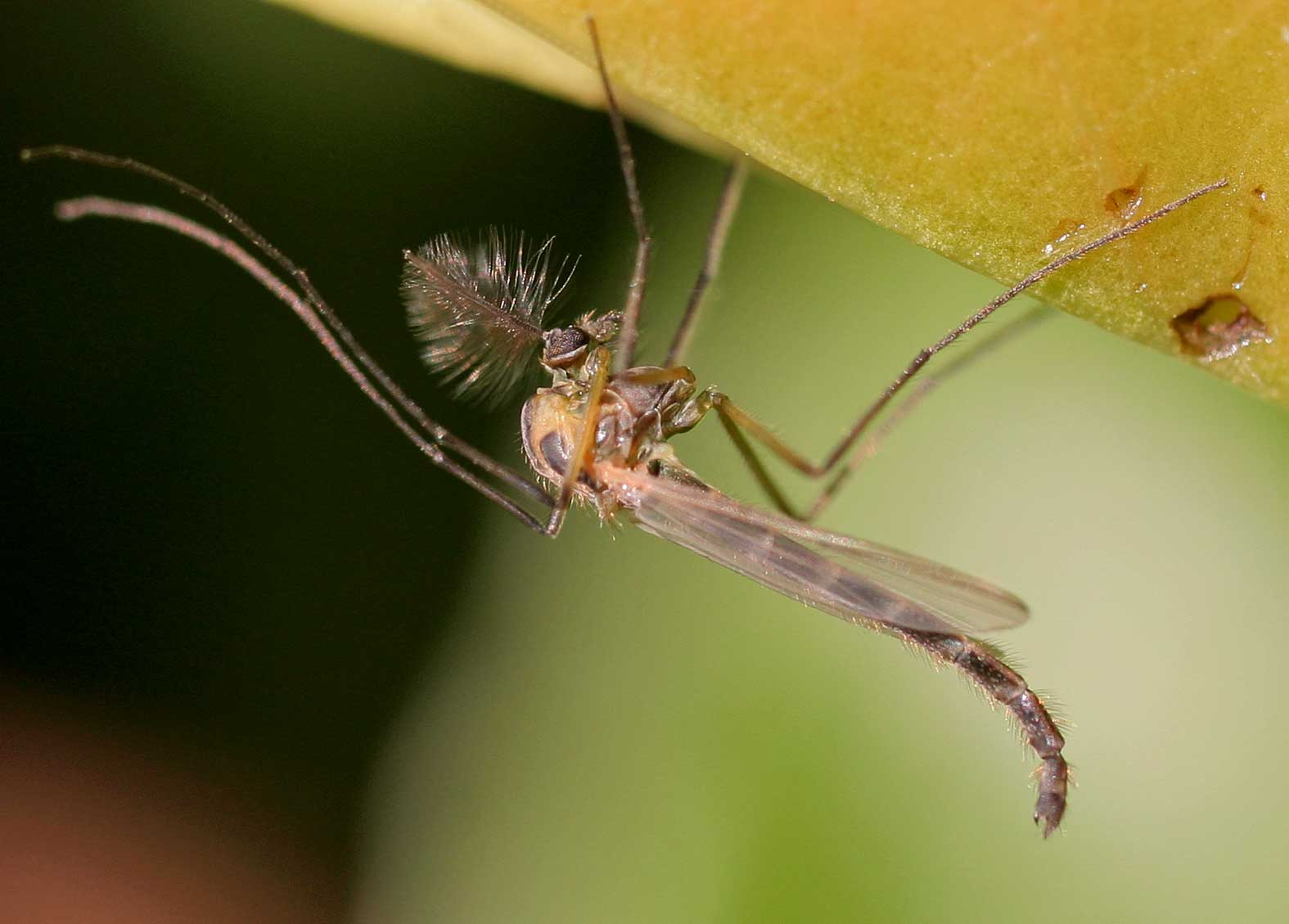
Among the commonest invertebrate food items of hummingbirds are flies, particularly nonbiting midges, members of the family Chironomidae

Hummingbirds exhibit various feeding strategies and some morphological adaptations for insectivory. Typically, they hawk for small flying insects, but also glean spiders from their webs. Bill shape may play a role, as hummingbirds with longer or more curved bills may be unable to hawk efficiently, and so rely more heavily on gleaning spiders. Regardless of bill shape, spiders are a common prey item; other very common prey items include flies, especially those of the family Chironomidae, as well as various Hymenopterans (such as wasps and ants) and Hemipterans. The aforementioned California study found three species to consume invertebrates from 72 families in 15 orders, with flies alone occurring in over 90% of samples; the three species exhibited high dietary overlap, with little evidence for niche partitioning. This suggests that prey availability is not a limiting resource for hummingbirds.

Estimates of overall dietary makeup for hummingbirds vary, but insectivory is often cited as comprising 5–15% of feeding time budgets, typically; 2–12% is a figure that is also cited. In one study, 84% of feeding time was allotted to nectar feeding if breeding females are included, and 89% otherwise; 86% of total feeding records were on nectar. It has been estimated, based on time budgets and other data, that the hummingbird diet is generally about 90% nectar and 10% arthropods by mass. As their nestlings consume only arthropods, and possibly because their own requirements increase, breeding females spend 3–4 times as long as males foraging for arthropods, although 65–70% of their feeding time is still devoted to nectar. Estimates for overall insectivory can be as low as <5%. Such low numbers have been documented for some species; insects comprised 3% of foraging attempts for Peruvian shining sunbeams in one study, while the purple-throated carib has been reported to spend <1% of time consuming insects in Dominica. Both species also have more typical numbers recorded elsewhere, however. Overall, for most hummingbirds, insectivory is an essential and regular, albeit minor, component of the diet, while nectar is the primary feeding focus when conditions allow. It has been shown that floral abundance (but not floral diversity) influences hummingbird diversity, but that arthropod abundance does not (i.e., that it is non-limiting).

Hummingbirds do not spend all day flying, as the energy cost would be prohibitive; the majority of their activity consists simply of sitting or perching. Hummingbirds eat many small meals and consume around half their weight in nectar (twice their weight in nectar, if the nectar is 25% sugar) each day. Hummingbirds digest their food rapidly due to their small size and high metabolism; a mean retention time less than an hour has been reported. Hummingbirds spend an average of 20% of their time feeding and 75–80% sitting and digesting.

Because their high metabolism makes them vulnerable to starvation, hummingbirds are highly attuned to food sources. Some species, including many found in North America, are territorial and try to guard food sources (such as a feeder) against other hummingbirds, attempting to ensure a future food supply. Additionally, hummingbirds have an enlarged hippocampus, a brain region facilitating spatial memory used to map flowers previously visited during nectar foraging.

=== Beak specializations ===
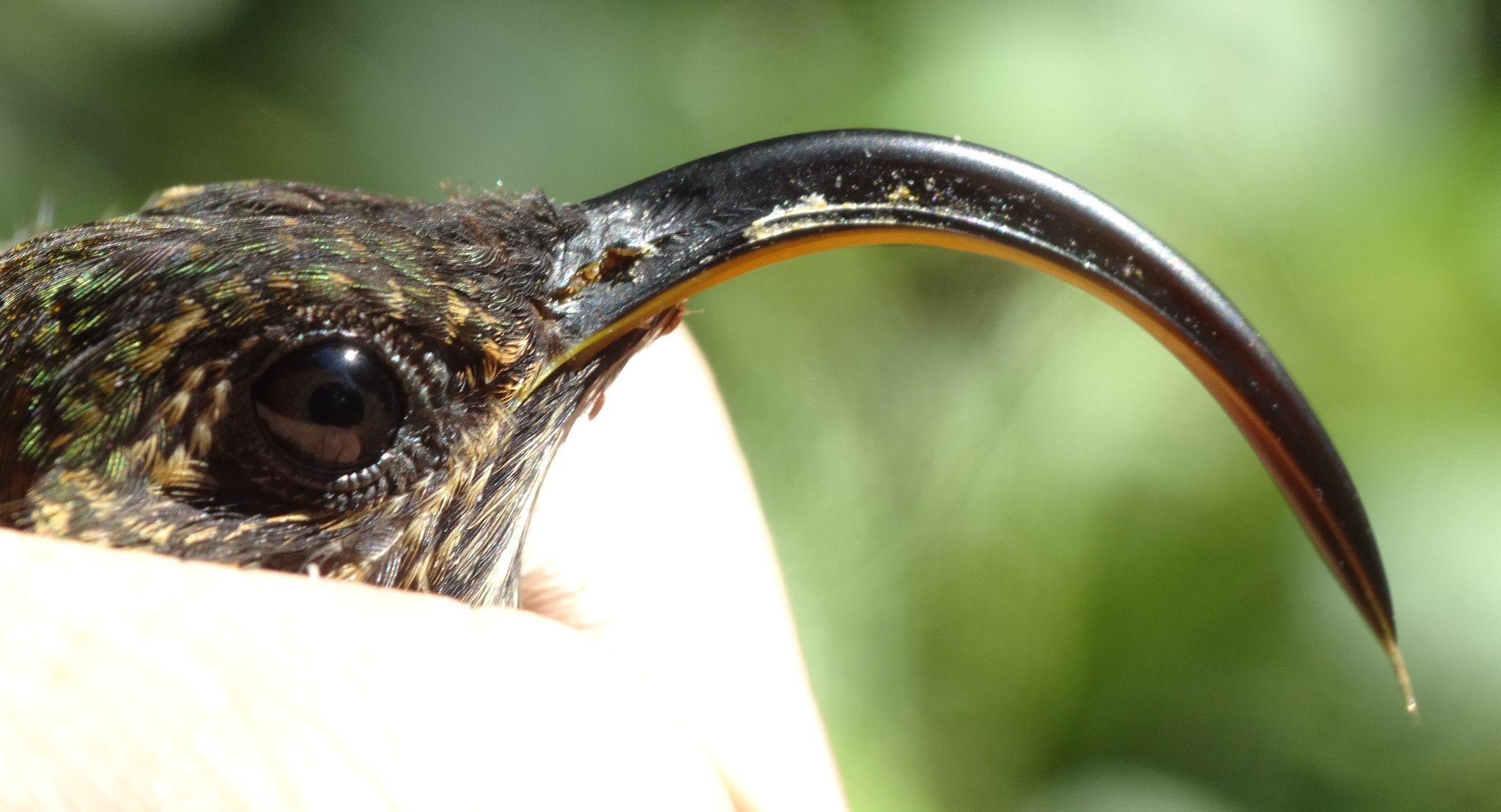
Curved beak (approx. 90^{o}) of the white-tipped sicklebill

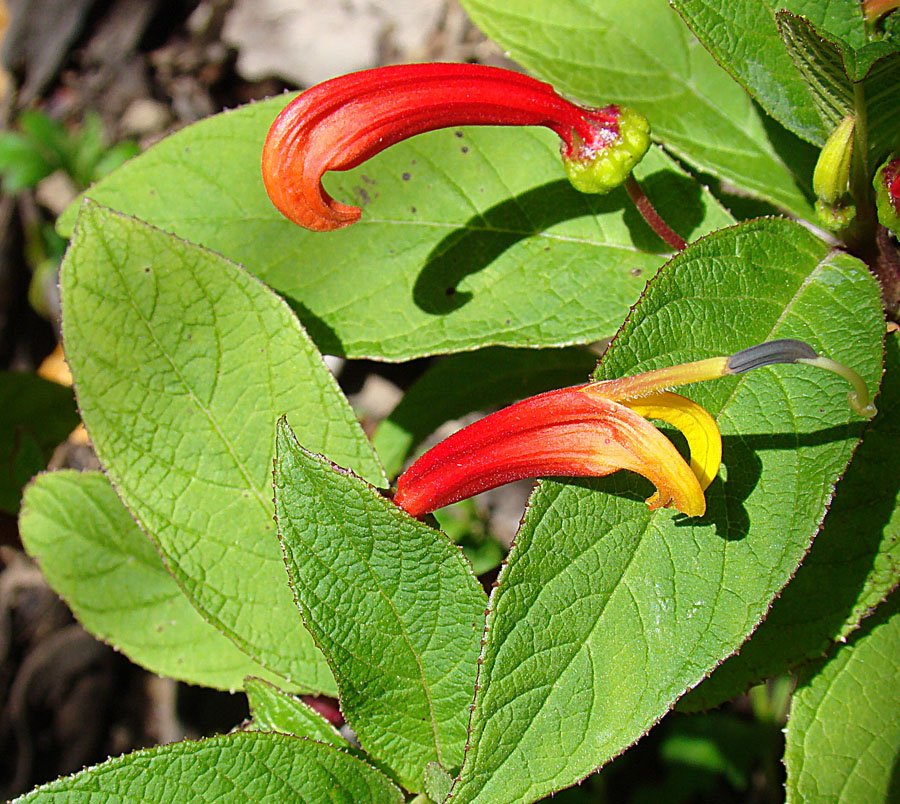
Centropogon flowers

Coevolution of the sicklebill beak curve facilitates both nectar feeding and pollination of long tubular Centropogon flowers.

The shapes of hummingbird beaks (also called bills) vary widely as an adaptation for specialized feeding, with some 7000 flowering plants pollinated by hummingbird nectar feeding. Hummingbird beak lengths range from about 6 millimetres (0.24 in) to as long as 110 millimetres (4.3 in). When catching insects in flight, a hummingbird's jaw flexes downward to widen the beak for successful capture.

The extreme curved beaks of sicklebills are adapted for extracting nectar from the curved corolla tubes of Centropogon flowers. Some species, such as hermits (Phaethornis spp.), have long beaks that enable insertion deeply into flowers with long corolla tubes. Thornbills have short, sharp beaks adapted for feeding from flowers with short corolla tubes and piercing the bases of longer ones. The beak of the fiery-tailed awlbill has an upturned tip adapted for feeding on nectar from tubular flowers while hovering.

=== Perception of sweet nectar ===
Perception of sweetness in nectar evolved in hummingbirds during their genetic divergence from insectivorous swifts, their closest bird relatives. Although the only known sweet sensory receptor, called T1R2, is absent in birds, receptor expression studies showed that hummingbirds adapted a carbohydrate receptor from the T1R1-T1R3 receptor, identical to the one perceived as umami in humans, essentially repurposing it to function as a nectar sweetness receptor. This adaptation for taste enabled hummingbirds to detect and exploit sweet nectar as an energy source, facilitating their distribution across geographical regions where nectar-bearing flowers are available.

=== Tongue as a micropump ===
Drawing of a hummingbird tongue; 1874, unknown artist. Upon reaching nectar in a flower, the tongue splits into opposing tips fringed with lamellae and grooves, which fill with nectar, then retracts to a cylindrical configuration into the bill to complete the drink.

Hummingbirds drink with their long tongues by rapidly lapping nectar. Their tongues have semicircular tubes which run down their lengths to facilitate nectar consumption via rapid pumping in and out of the nectar. While capillary action was believed to be what drew nectar into these tubes, high-speed photography revealed that the tubes open down their sides as the tongue goes into the nectar, and then close around the nectar, trapping it so it can be pulled back into the beak over a period of 14 milliseconds per lick at a rate of up to 20 licks per second. The tongue, which is forked, is compressed until it reaches nectar, then the tongue springs open, the rapid action traps the nectar which moves up the grooves, like a pump action, with capillary action not involved. Consequently, tongue flexibility enables accessing, transporting and unloading nectar via pump action, not by a capillary syphon as once believed.

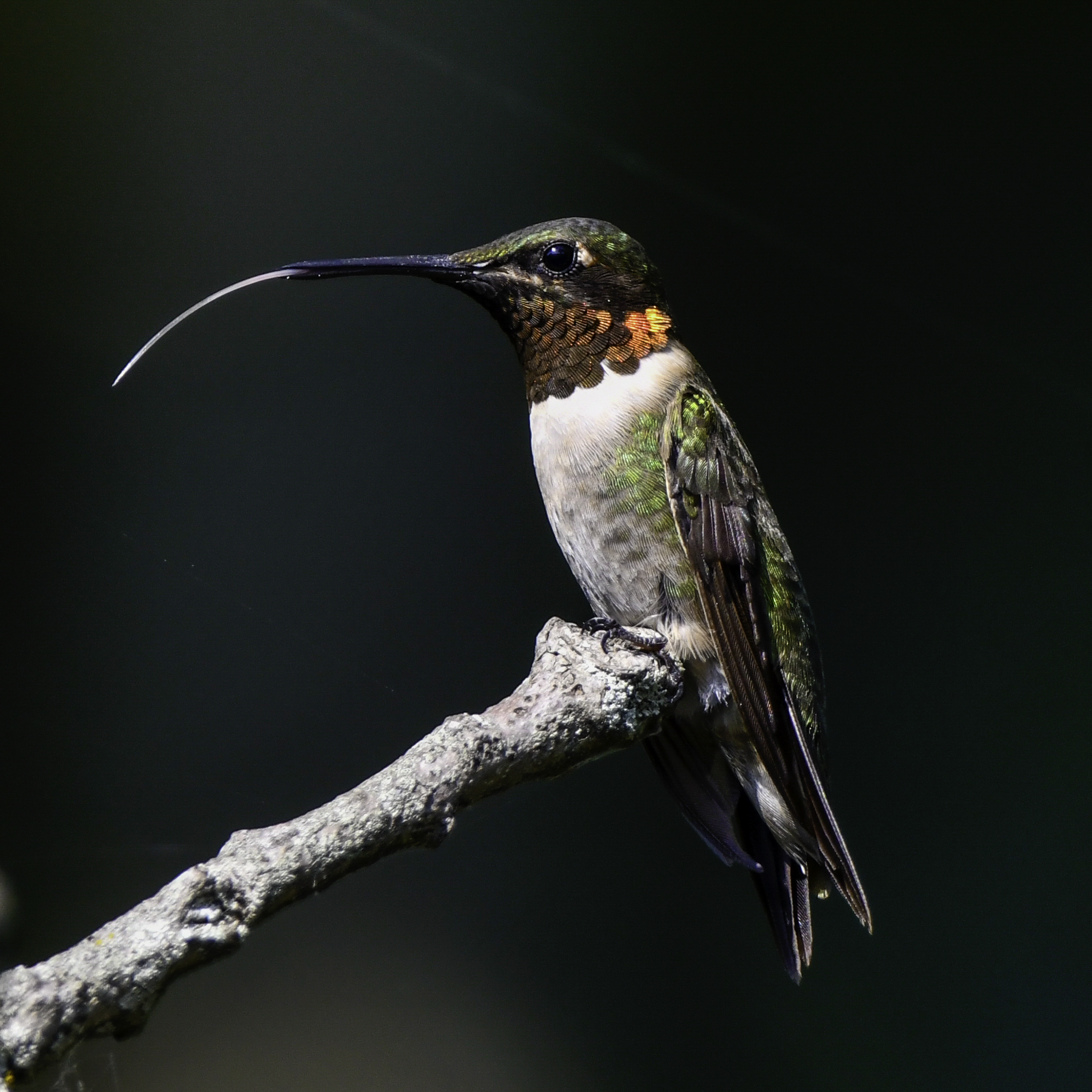
Male ruby-throated hummingbird (Archilochus colubris) with tongue extended

=== Feeders and artificial nectar ===
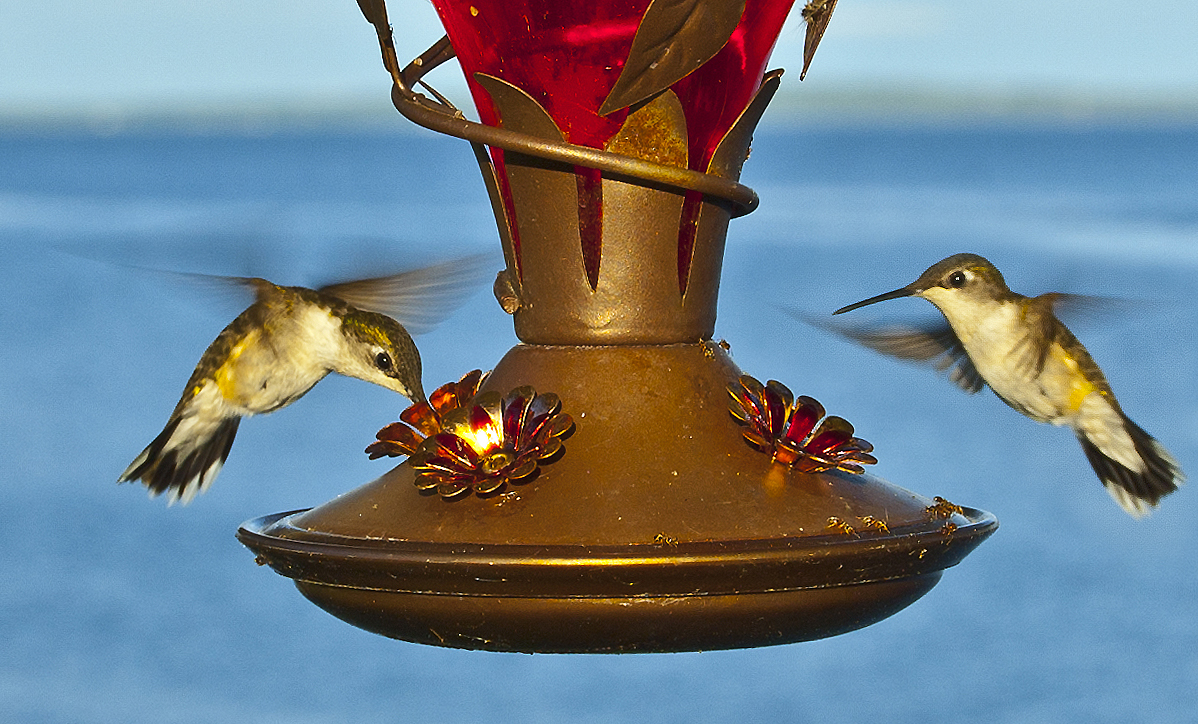
Hummingbirds hovering at an artificial nectar feeder

In the wild, hummingbirds visit flowers for food, extracting nectar, which is 55% sucrose, 24% glucose, and 21% fructose on a dry-matter basis. Hummingbirds also take sugar-water from bird feeders, which allow people to observe and enjoy hummingbirds up close while providing the birds with a reliable source of energy, especially when flower blossoms are less abundant. A negative aspect of artificial feeders, however, is that the birds may seek less flower nectar for food, and so may reduce the amount of pollination their feeding naturally provides.

White granulated sugar is used in hummingbird feeders in a 20% concentration as a common recipe, although hummingbirds will defend feeders more aggressively when sugar content is at 35%, indicating preference for nectar with higher sugar content. Organic and "raw" sugars contain iron, which can be harmful, and brown sugar, agave syrup, molasses, and artificial sweeteners also should not be used. Honey is made by bees from the nectar of flowers, but it is not good to use in feeders because when it is diluted with water, microorganisms easily grow in it, causing it to spoil rapidly.

Red food dye was once thought to be a favorable ingredient for the nectar in home feeders, but it is unnecessary. Commercial products sold as "instant nectar" or "hummingbird food" may also contain preservatives or artificial flavors, as well as dyes, which are unnecessary and potentially harmful. Although some commercial products contain small amounts of nutritional additives, hummingbirds obtain all necessary nutrients from the insects they eat, rendering added nutrients unnecessary.

=== Visual cues of foraging ===
Hummingbirds have exceptional visual acuity providing them with discrimination of food sources while foraging. Although hummingbirds are thought to be attracted to color while seeking food, such as red flowers or artificial feeders, experiments indicate that location and flower nectar quality are the most important "beacons" for foraging. Hummingbirds depend little on visual cues of flower color to beacon to nectar-rich locations, but rather they use surrounding landmarks to find the nectar reward.

In at least one hummingbird species – the green-backed firecrown (Sephanoides sephaniodes) – flower colors preferred are in the red-green wavelength for the bird's visual system, providing a higher contrast than for other flower colors. Further, the crown plumage of firecrown males is highly iridescent in the red wavelength range (peak at 650 nanometers), possibly providing a competitive advantage of dominance when foraging among other hummingbird species with less colorful plumage. The ability to discriminate colors of flowers and plumage is enabled by a visual system having four single cone cells and a double cone screened by photoreceptor oil droplets which enhance color discrimination.

=== Olfaction ===
While hummingbirds rely primarily on vision and hearing to assess competition from bird and insect foragers near food sources, they may also be able to detect by smell the presence in nectar of insect defensive chemicals (such as formic acid) and aggregation pheromones of foraging ants, which discourage feeding.

== In myth and culture ==
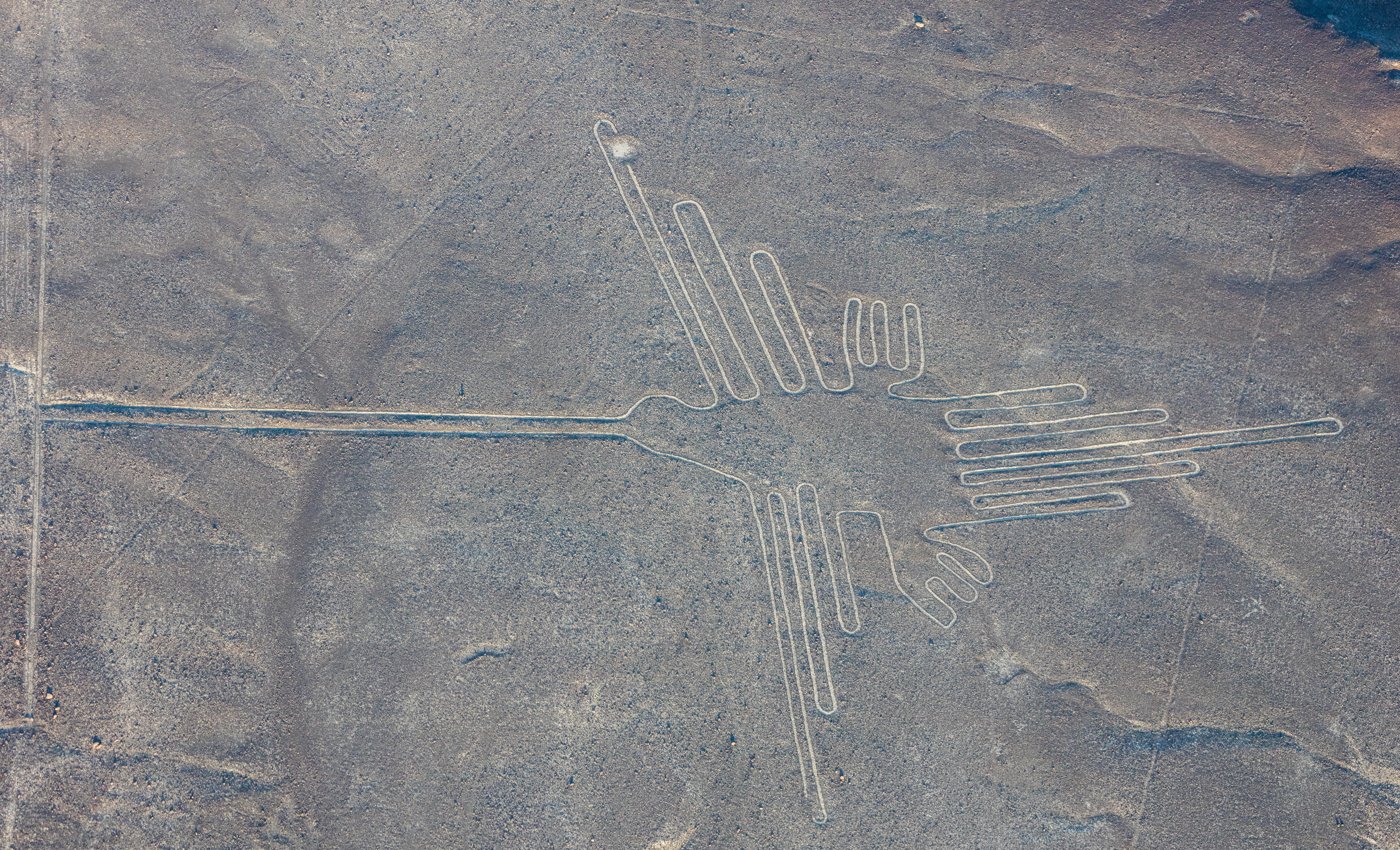
Nazca Lines - hummingbird

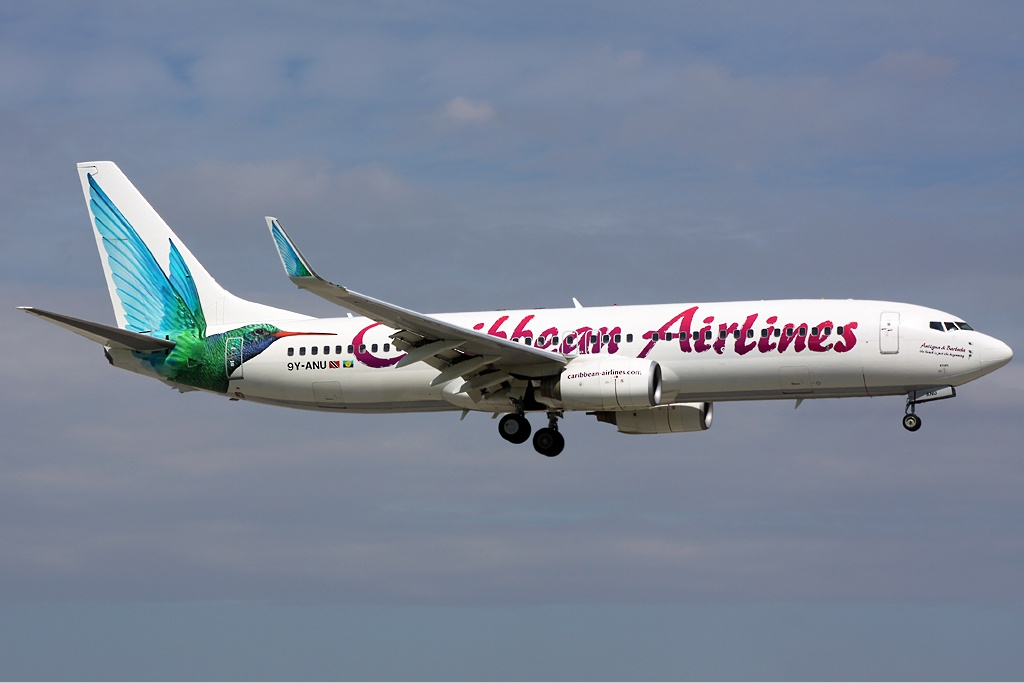
Hummingbird emblem on Caribbean Airlines

Aztecs wore hummingbird talismans, artistic representations of hummingbirds and fetishes made from actual hummingbird parts as emblematic for vigor, energy, and propensity to do work along with their sharp beaks that symbolically mimic instruments of weaponry, bloodletting, penetration, and intimacy. Hummingbird talismans were prized as drawing sexual potency, energy, vigor, and skill at arms and warfare to the wearer. The Aztec god of war Huitzilopochtli is often depicted in art as a hummingbird. Aztecs believed that fallen warriors would be reincarnated as hummingbirds. The Nahuatl word huitzil translates to hummingbird.

One of the Nazca Lines depicts a hummingbird.

Trinidad and Tobago, known as "The land of the hummingbird", displays a hummingbird on its coat of arms, 1-cent coin, and livery on its national airline, Caribbean Airlines. The Hummingbird Medal is awarded to individuals for significant contributions to Trinidad and Tobago.

Mt. Umunhum in the Santa Cruz Mountains of Northern California is Ohlone for "resting place of the hummingbird".

The Gibson Hummingbird is an acoustic guitar model that incorporates a pickguard in the shape of a hummingbird by Gibson Brands, a major guitar manufacturer.

During the costume competition of the Miss Universe 2016 beauty pageant, Miss Ecuador, Connie Jiménez, wore a costume inspired by hummingbird wing feathers.

== Gallery ==
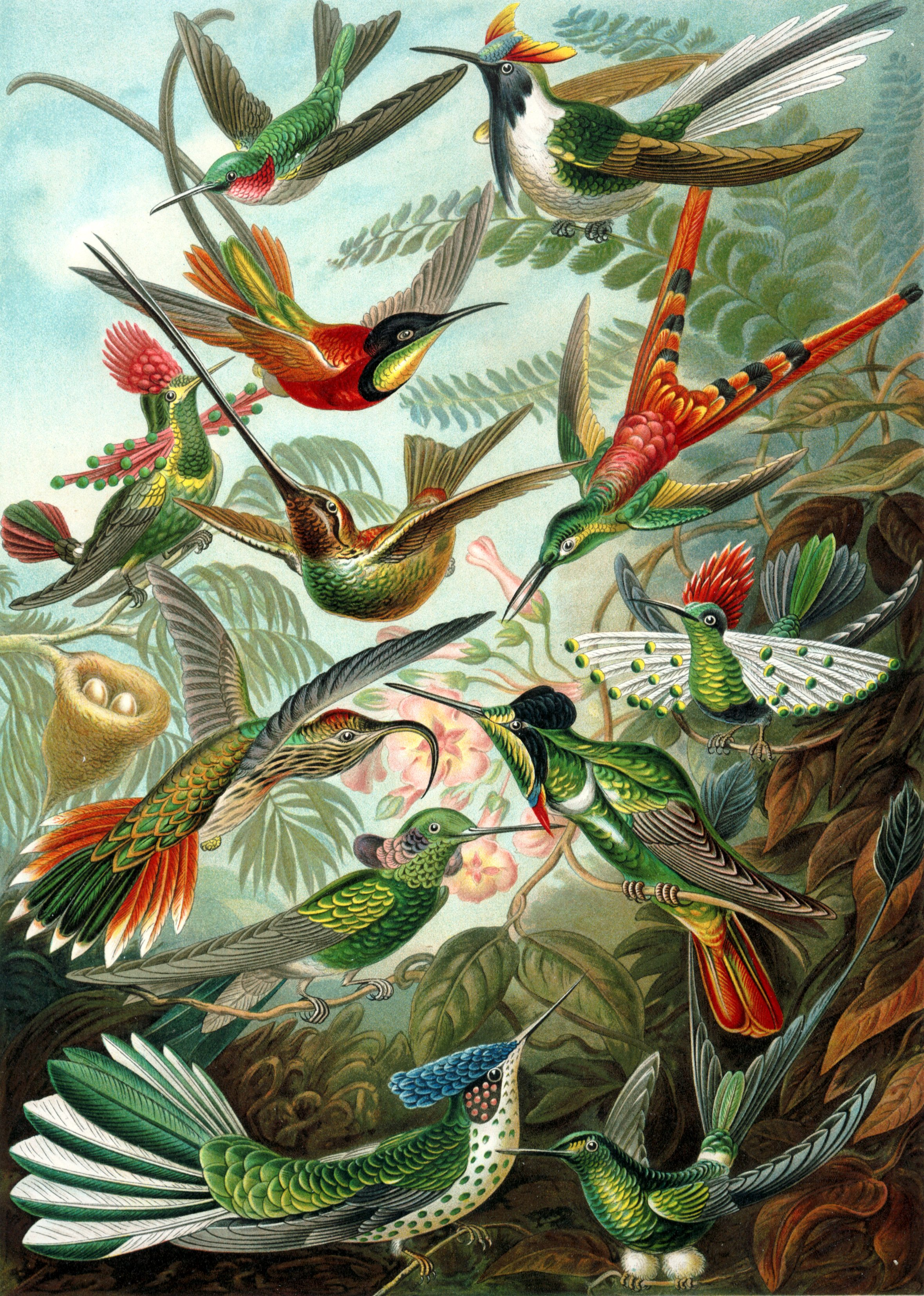
A color plate illustration from Ernst Haeckel's Kunstformen der Natur (1899), showing a variety of hummingbirds

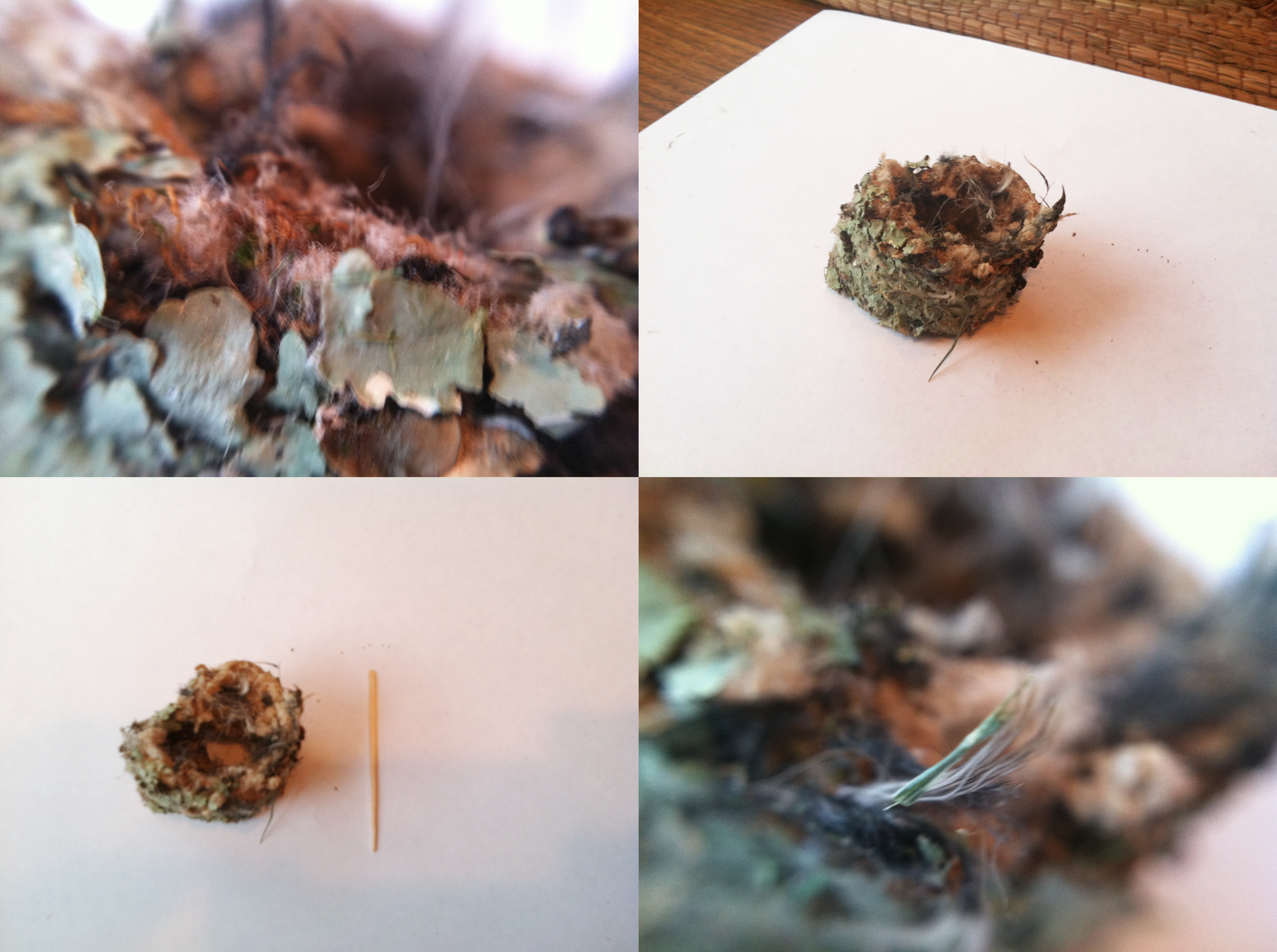
Fallen Anna's hummingbird nest shown next to a toothpick for scale

== See also ==
- AeroVironment Nano Hummingbird – artificial hummingbird
