= Fructose-bisphosphatase 2 =

Protein-coding gene in the species Homo sapiens

FBP2

Identifiers
- Aliases: FBP2, fructose-bisphosphatase 2, CORLK
- External IDs: OMIM: 603027; MGI: 95491; GeneCards: FBP2
Available structures
PDB	Ortholog search: PDBe RCSB
PDB	List of PDB id codes 3IFA, 3IFC, 4HE0, 4HE1, 4HE2, 5ET7, 5ET5, 5ET6
Enzyme activity
EC #	BRENDA	ExPASy	KEGG	MetaCyc
3.1.3.11	↗	↗	↗	↗

Gene location (Human)
Chr.	Chromosome 9 (human)
Band	9q22.32	Start	94,558,720 bp
Band	9q22.32	End	94,593,824 bp

Gene location (Mouse)
Chr.	Chromosome 13 (mouse)
Band	13|13 B3	Start	62,984,691 bp
Band	13|13 B3	End	63,006,236 bp
RNA expression pattern
Bgee	Human / Mouse (ortholog); Top expressed in: muscle of thigh; biceps brachii; vastus lateralis muscle; triceps brachii muscle; Skeletal muscle tissue of rectus abdominis; Skeletal muscle tissue of biceps brachii; gastrocnemius muscle; glutes; thoracic diaphragm; body of tongue / Top expressed in: blastocyst; migratory enteric neural crest cell; ileum; duodenum; jejunum; morula; intestinal epithelium; epithelium of small intestine; intestinal villus; Paneth cell; More reference expression data
BioGPS	n/a
Gene ontology
Molecular function	phosphoric ester hydrolase activity; catalytic activity; hydrolase activity; protein binding; metal ion binding; phosphatase activity; fructose 1,6-bisphosphate 1-phosphatase activity; identical protein binding
Cellular component	cytoplasm; cell junction; Z discdkac; extracellular exosome; nucleus; nucleoplasm; cytosol; plasma membrane
Biological process	fructose metabolic process; metabolism; dephosphorylation; sucrose biosynthetic process; fructose 6-phosphate metabolic process; gluconeogenesis; fructose 1,6-bisphosphate metabolic process; carbohydrate metabolic process
Sources:Amigo / QuickGO
Orthologs
Databases	NCBI: entry; OMA: entry
Species	Human	Mouse
Entrez	8789	14120
Ensembl	ENSG00000130957	ENSMUSG00000021456
UniProt	O00757	P70695
RefSeq (mRNA)	NM_003837	NM_007994
RefSeq (protein)	NP_003828	NP_032020
Location (UCSC)	Chr 9: 94.56 – 94.59 Mb	Chr 13: 62.98 – 63.01 Mb
PubMed search
- Wikidata
View/Edit Human	View/Edit Mouse

Fructose-bisphosphatase 2 is an enzyme that in humans is encoded by the FBP2 gene.

== Function ==
This gene encodes a gluconeogenesis regulatory enzyme which catalyzes the hydrolysis of fructose 2,6-bisphosphate to fructose 6-phosphate and inorganic phosphate.
