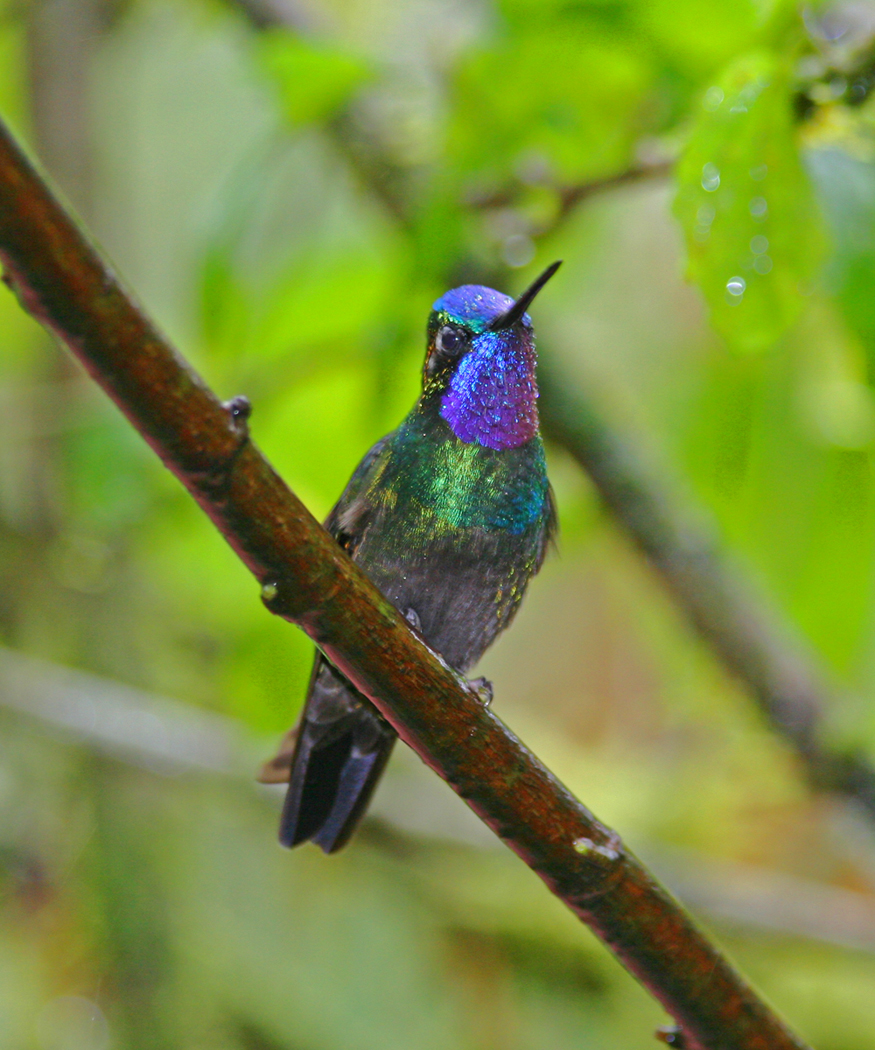
- Male in Costa Rica
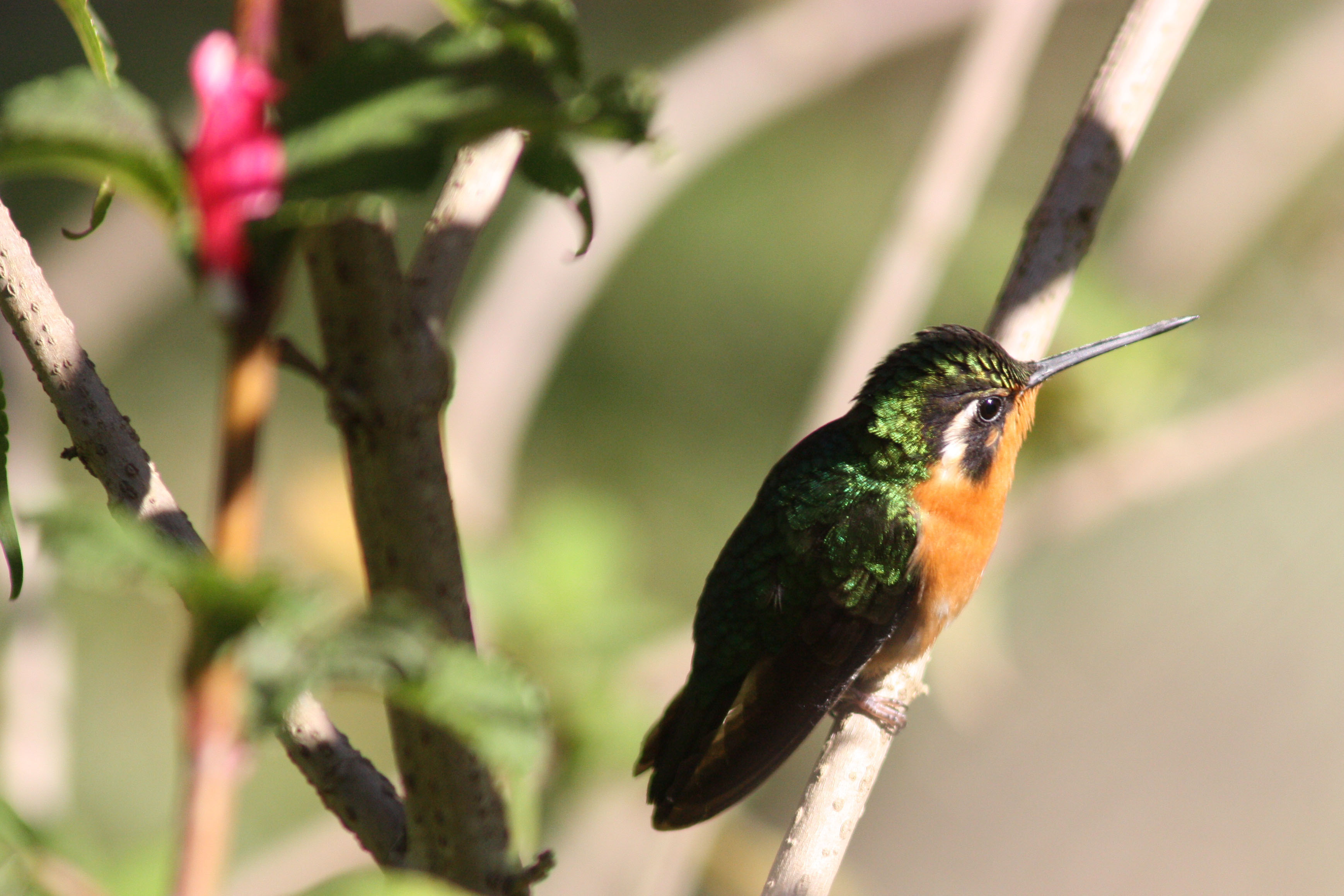
- Female in Costa Rica

Conservation status
- Least Concern (IUCN 3.1)
- CITES Appendix II

Scientific classification
- Kingdom: Animalia
- Phylum: Chordata
- Class: Aves
- Clade: Strisores
- Order: Apodiformes
- Family: Trochilidae
- Genus: Lampornis
- Species: L. calolaemus

Binomial name
- Lampornis calolaemus (Salvin, 1865)
- Range of L. calolaemus

Synonyms
- Lampornis calolaema (lapsus)

= Purple-throated mountaingem =

Species of hummingbird

The purple-throated mountaingem (Lampornis calolaemus) is a species of hummingbird in tribe Lampornithini of subfamily Trochilinae. It is found in Costa Rica, Nicaragua, and Panama.

== Taxonomy and systematics ==
The purple-throated mountaingem's taxonomy is somewhat unsettled. As late as 1999 various authors have treated it, the white-throated mountaingem (L. castaneoventris) and gray-tailed mountaingem (L. cinereicauda) as a single species. Others have kept the purple-throated separate but lumped the other two as a single species. These three species form a closely related group that evolved some 3.5 million years ago and has diversified since.

The purple-throated mountaingem currently (2022) is its own species with three subspecies, the nominate L. c. calolaemus, L. c. pectoralis, and L. c. homogenes.

== Description ==
The purple-throated mountaingem is 10 to 11.5 cm (3.9 to 4.5 in) long and weighs 4.5 to 6 g (0.16 to 0.21 oz). Both sexes of all subspecies have a medium-length straight black bill, a white to pale buff stripe behind the eye, and a fairly long tail.

Adult males of the nominate subspecies L. c. calolaemus have a glittering emerald green to bluish green forehead and crown. The rest of their upperparts are metallic bronze-green that shades to bluish or grass green on the uppertail coverts. Much of the face is dusky bronze green and the gorget is metallic violet or purple. The breast is bright metallic green with duller flanks and belly that tend to bronzy green or gray. The undertail coverts are deep bronzy gray with paler gray margins. The tail is dull blue-black.

Adult females of the nominate subspecies have bright metallic green upperparts that are somewhat bluish on the uppertail coverts and a bit bronzish elsewhere. The face is mostly blackish. The throat, breast, and belly are tawny yellow and the undertail coverts dull white to tawny buff. The central tail feathers and the upper half of the others are dull metallic green or bronze green. The lower half of the outer tail feathers are mostly black with pale gray tips.

Immature males of the nominate subspecies are much like the adult female, but with a dusky chin and throat and brownish gray undertail coverts with dull white margins.

Males of subspecies L. c. pectoralis have a deeper purple gorget than the nominate. The green of their neck and upperatail coverts is significantly darker than the nominates, and their belly and undertail coverts are also darker, with a smaller area of metallic green on the breast.

Males of subspecies L. c. homogenes are similar to those of the nominate but have a darker gray breast and belly. Females' upperparts are more bluish green than the nominate's, their central tail feathers darker bronze-green, and their underparts darker and more reddish.

== Distribution and habitat ==
Subspecies L. c. pectoralis of purple-throated mountaingem is found from far southwestern Nicaragua to the Cordillera de Guanacaste in northwestern Costa Rica. The nominate L. c. calolaemus is found in the Cordillera Central and northern part of the Cordillera de Talamanca of northern and central Costa Rica. L. c. homogenes is found in western Panama from Chiriquí Province to Coclé Province and probably also in southern Costa Rica.

The species inhabits humid montane evergreen forest and cloudforest, where it favors steep slopes and broken terrain. In central Costa Rica it ranges in elevation from 1,200 to 2,500 m (3,900 to 8,200 ft) and is found as low as 800 m (2,600 ft) in northern Costa Rica.

== Behavior ==
=== Movement ===
In some areas the purple-throated mountaingem moves to as low as 300 m (980 ft) after the breeding season.

=== Feeding ===
The purple-throated mountaingem feeds mostly on nectar. Males defend patches of flowers from other hummingbird species, from males of its own species, and also from females after courtship. Females are less territorial and often feed by trap-lining.

The species takes nectar from a wide variety of flowers. (Note: For example Stenostephanus blepharorachis (Acanthaceae), Besleria formosa and Besleria triflora (Gesneriaceae), Palicourea lasiorrhachis and Psychotria elata (Rubiaceae). Other foodplants include assorted Alstroemeriaceae, Bromeliaceae, Campanulaceae, Ericaceae (e.g. Psammisia ramiflora), Heliconiaceae and Zingiberales.) It is the primary pollinator of Psychotria elata and Palicourea lasiorrachis (Rubiaceae).

Females have slightly longer bills than males. There is some degree of niche differentiation between the sexes. Though both prefer flowers with a corolla 14 to 21 mm (0.55 to 0.83 in) long by 3.5 to 8 mm (0.14 to 0.31 in) wide, females far more often than males utilize plants with longer (Note: Up to c.40 mm (1.6 in), e.g. Guzmania nicaraguensis (Bromeliaceae).) and thinner (Note: Up to c.20 times as long as wide, e.g. Dicliptera trifurca (Acanthaceae), Burmeistera tenuiflora (Campanulaceae).) corollas.

Like most hummingbirds, the purple-throated mountaingem also feeds on insectes. Males capture them by hawking from a perch. Females hover-glean, often beating their wings against foliage which apparently flushes prey.

=== Breeding ===
The purple-throated mountain-gem breeds between October and April, the rainy season. The female is entirely responsible for nest building, incubation, and nestling care. The nest is a thick-walled open cup of plant fibers with moss and lichen on the outside. It is placed in the understory, on bamboo or in a small tree, and typically about 2 m (7 ft) above the ground. The female incubates the clutch of two white eggs for 17 to 18 days and fledging occurs 22 to 23 days after hatch.

=== Vocalization ===
The purple-throated mountaingem's song is "high, thin, and dry, a complex medley of sputtering and warbling notes." A frequently heard call is variously described as "trrrt" or "a sharp, penetrating, buzzy zeet or zeep." It also gives "higher-pitched, scratchy, chattering notes" when interacting with other hummingbirds.

== Status ==
The IUCN has assessed the purple-throated mountaingem as being of Least Concern. Its population is estimated to be between 50,000 and 500,000 mature individuals but is thought to be decreasing. No specific threats have been identified. Though some of its habitat has been altered by humans, much remains untouched, and "studies attest to the strong resiliency of Purple-throated Mountain-gem populations in the face of habitat alteration."

== Gallery ==
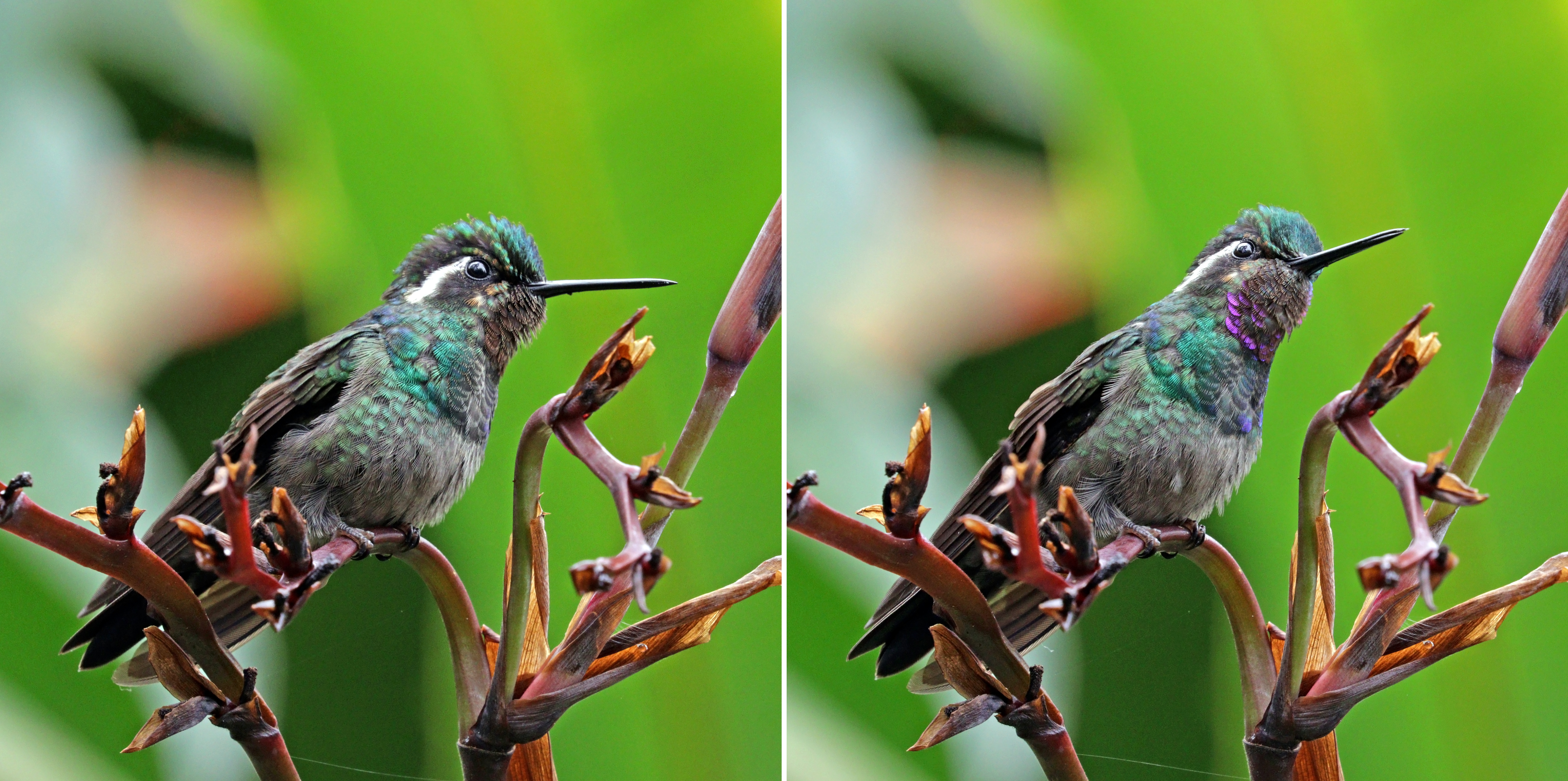
Composite showing the effect of light reflection on colors of male's gorget, Mount Totumas cloud forest, Panama

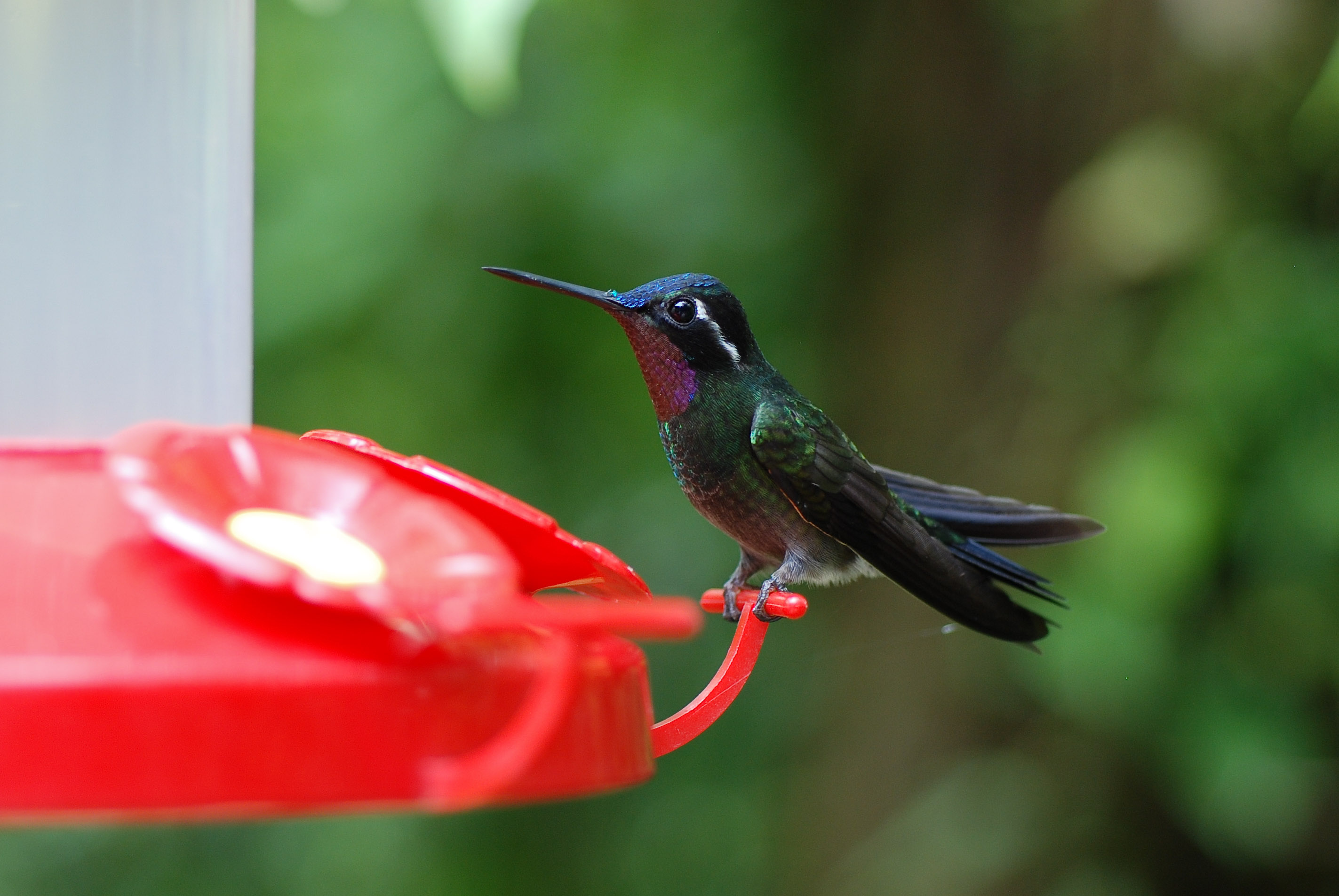
Male at feeder
