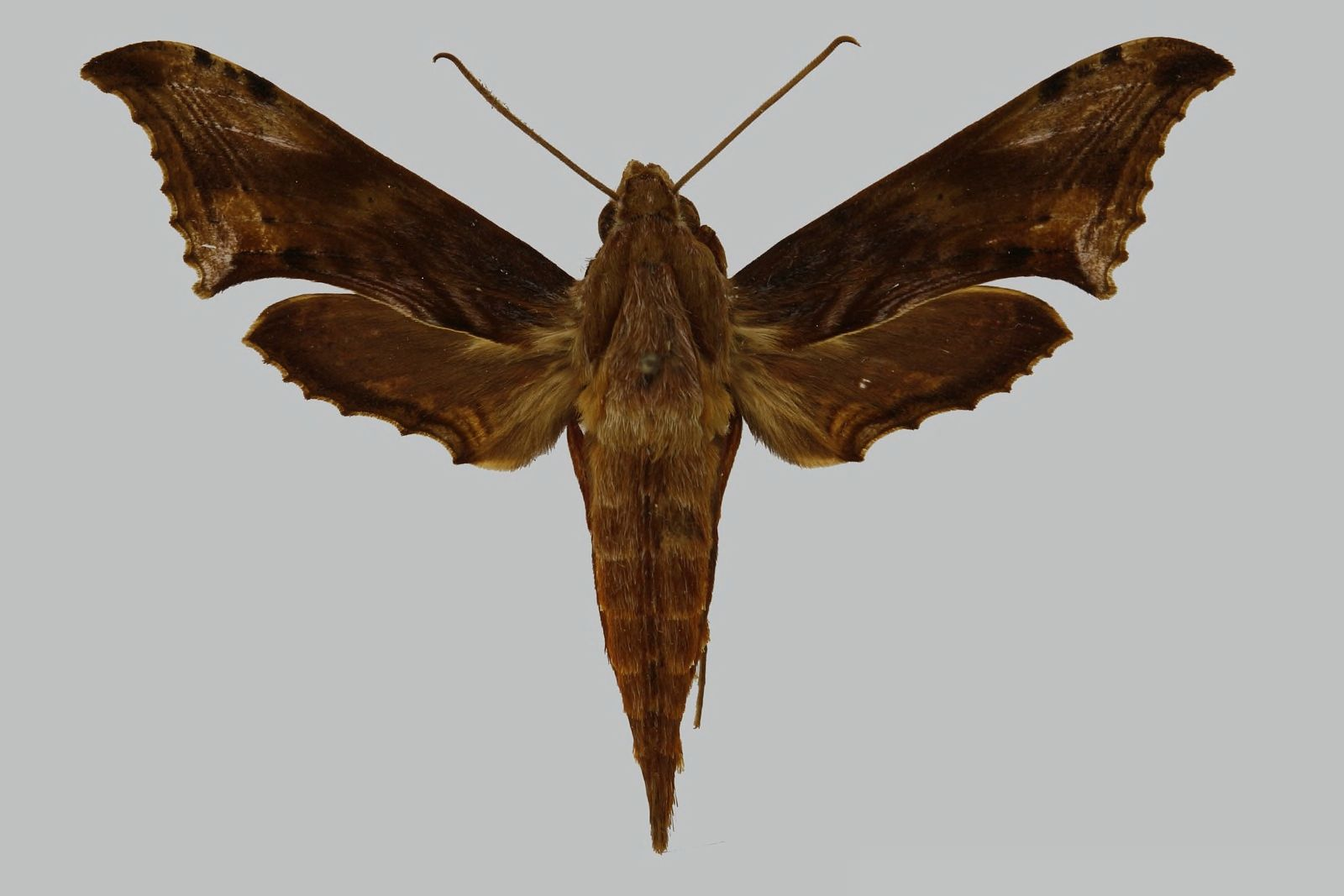

Scientific classification
- Domain: Eukaryota
- Kingdom: Animalia
- Phylum: Arthropoda
- Class: Insecta
- Order: Lepidoptera
- Family: Sphingidae
- Genus: Xylophanes
- Species: X. godmani

Binomial name
- Xylophanes godmani (H. Druce, 1882)

Synonyms
- Choerocampa godmani H. Druce, 1882

= Xylophanes godmani =

Species of moth

Xylophanes godmani is a moth of the family Sphingidae. It is known from Panama.

It is most similar to Xylophanes rhodina, but the outer margin of the forewing is scalloped, the apex more falcate and the tornus more pronounced. The forewing upperside is also similar to Xylophanes rhodina, but the pattern is more variegated, the basalmost postmedian band is sinuate and the area distal to the longitudinal band is conspicuously paler than the rest of the wing. The hindwing is narrower than in Xylophanes rhodina.

Adults are probably on wing year-round.

The larvae probably feed on Psychotria correae, Psychotria elata, Psychotria eurycarpa and Exostema mexicanum and possibly other Rubiaceae species.
