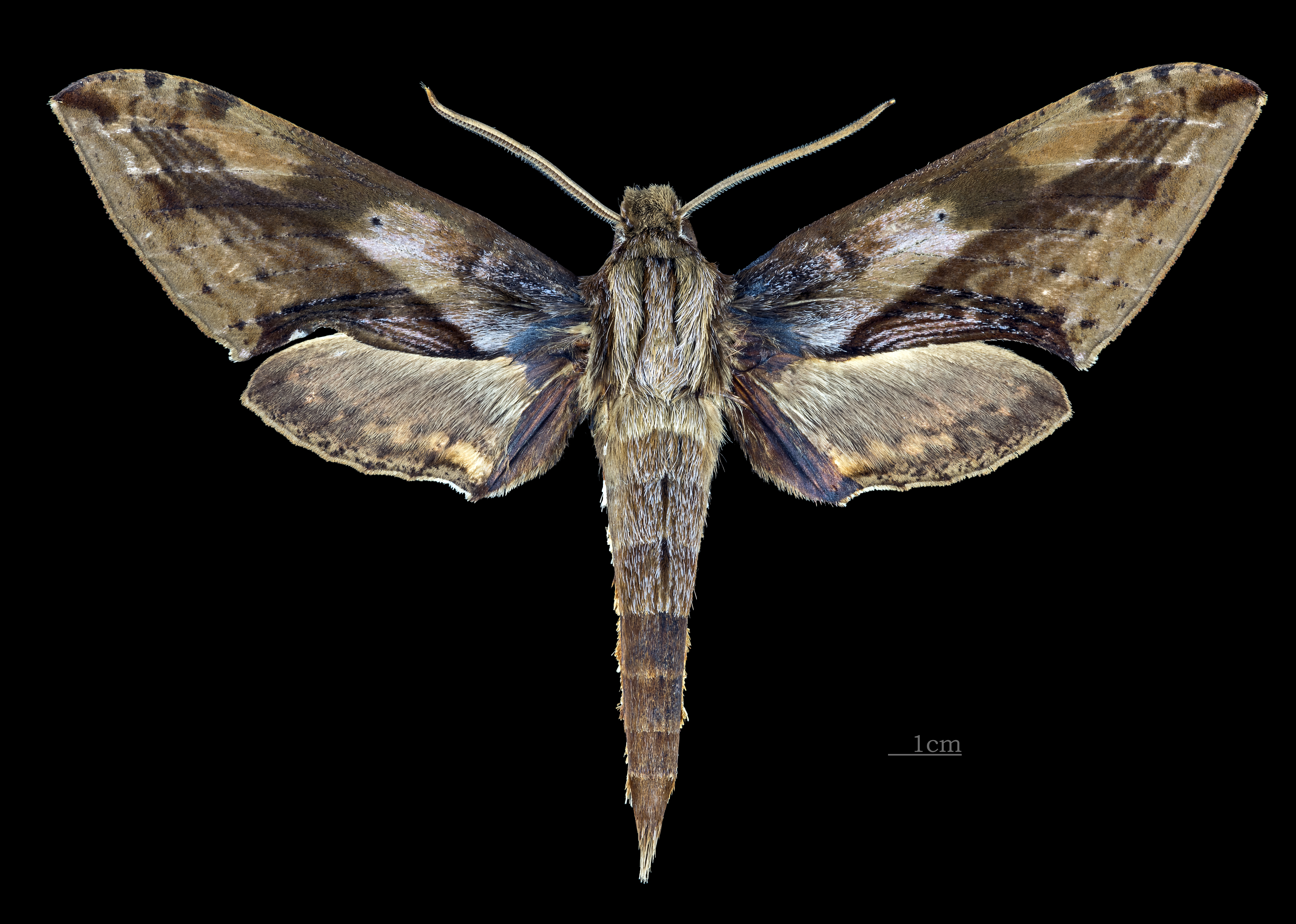
- Male dorsal
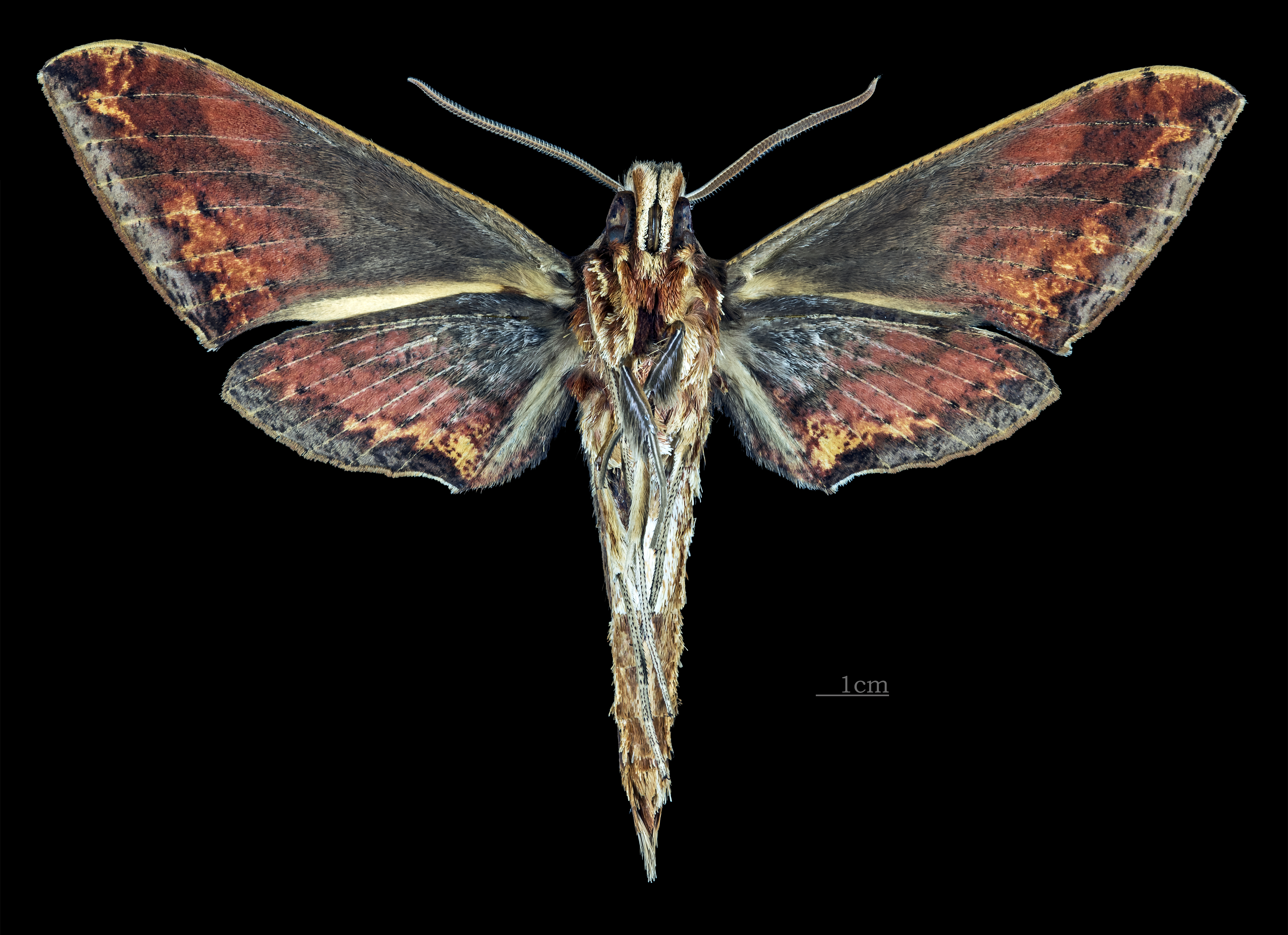
- Male ventral

Scientific classification
- Domain: Eukaryota
- Kingdom: Animalia
- Phylum: Arthropoda
- Class: Insecta
- Order: Lepidoptera
- Family: Sphingidae
- Genus: Xylophanes
- Species: X. rhodina

Binomial name
- Xylophanes rhodina Rothschild & Jordan, 1903

= Xylophanes rhodina =

Species of moth

Xylophanes rhodina is a moth of the family Sphingidae. It is known from Panama and Costa Rica.

It is similar to Xylophanes godmani, but the outer margin of the forewing is entire and almost straight, the apex is less falcate and the tornus is less pronounced. The abdomen has a scattering of long, pinkish-grey scales and a triple dorsal line. The forewing upperside is orange-brown with darker brown markings. The discal spot is small, black and has a dark brown cloud distal to it that stretches longitudinally across the wing from the costa to the submarginal line. The basalmost postmedian line is straight and merges with the longitudinal band. The other postmedian lines are faint. The basal half of the forewing underside and marginal band are uniform pale brown, between which the postmedian area is pale orange strongly suffused with red and covered in a variable degree of dark brown spotting. The pattern of the longitudinal band and postmedian lines of the upperside is replicated below. The median band is narrow, orange, edged in dark brown with the outer edging twice as broad as the inner.

Adults are probably on wing year-round.

The larvae possibly feed on Psychotria panamensis, Psychotria nervosa and Pavonia guanacastensis.
