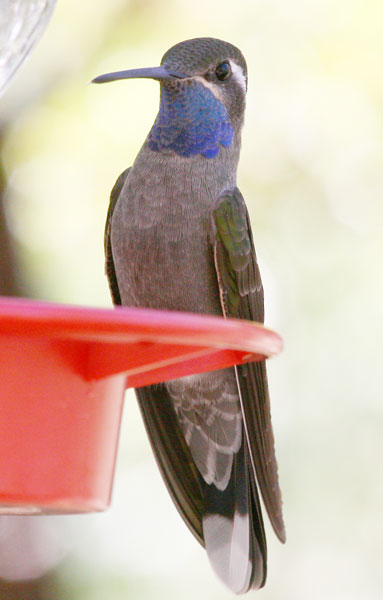
- Male L. c. bessophilus

Conservation status
- Least Concern (IUCN 3.1)
- CITES Appendix II (CITES)

Scientific classification
- Kingdom: Animalia
- Phylum: Chordata
- Class: Aves
- Clade: Strisores
- Order: Apodiformes
- Family: Trochilidae
- Genus: Lampornis
- Species: L. clemenciae

Binomial name
- Lampornis clemenciae (Lesson, 1830)

= Blue-throated mountaingem =

Species of hummingbird

The blue-throated mountaingem, also known as the blue-throated mountain-gem or blue-throated hummingbird (Lampornis clemenciae) is a species of hummingbird in tribe Lampornithini of subfamily Trochilinae. It is found in the United States and Mexico.

== Taxonomy and systematics ==
In the 19th century the blue-throated mountaingem was placed several different genera, and in the early 20th century in its own genus Cyanolaemus. Since the mid-1900s it has been in its present genus Lampornis. It has three subspecies, the nominate L. c. clemenciae, L. c. phasmorus, and L. c. bessophilus.

== Description ==
The blue-throated mountaingem is the largest hummingbird found in the United States. It is 11.2 to 12.8 cm (4.4 to 5.0 in) long. Males weigh an average of 8.4 g (0.30 oz) and females 6.8 g (0.24 oz). Both sexes have a medium-length black bill, though there is some variation among the subspecies and females' bills are longer than males'. Both sexes of all subspecies have a conspicuous white stripe behind the eye and a narrower stripe extending backward from the corner of its bill under a blackish cheek patch.

The nominate subspecies is the largest and has the longest bill. Adult males have an iridescent cobalt to cerulean blue gorget with a narrow buffy gray margin. They have mostly bright greenish bronze upperparts that become dark bronzy olive on the rump. They have medium brownish gray underparts with some greenish bronze iridescence on the sides of the breast. The tail is black with some faint indigo iridescence and white tips on the outer two pairs of feathers. Females have entirely medium gray underparts without the gorget.

Subspecies L. c. phasmorus is the smallest and has the shortest bill. Its upperparts are bright green rather than greenish bronze. Males' underparts are a cold gray rather than brownish gray and females' are dark gray. The iridescence on the sides of the breast is green. The white tips on the tail feathers are wider than those of the nominate.

Subspecies L. c. bessophilus is between the other two subspecies in size. Its upperparts are duller than the nominate's, with less bronze to the green. Males' underparts are brownish gray and females' medium pale gray; like the nominate there is some greenish bronze iridescence on the sides of the breast. The white tips on the tail feathers are the narrowest of all subspecies.

== Distribution and habitat ==
The nominated subspecies of blue-throated mountain gem has the largest range. It is found in Mexico's Sierra Madre Oriental and central plateau as far south as Oaxaca. L. c. basophils is found in southeastern Arizona and in the northwestern Mexican states of Sonora, Chihuahua, and Durango. L. c. phasmorus is positively known only from the Chisos Mountains of southern Texas, where it breeds, but its non-breeding range is not known. Birds in the northern Mexican state of Nuevo León may also be this subspecies rather than the nominate.

The blue-throated mountain gem is found in a variety of moist forest landscapes. In the US and northern Mexico, it occurs in riparian forest (often in canyons), pine-oak forest, and mixed coniferous forests. In central and southern Mexico it tends to favor coniferous forests. In Arizona it is found in the "sky island" mountain ranges, seldom below 1,300 m (4,300 ft) of elevation. Near Mexico City it occurs between 3,600 and 3,900 m (11,800 and 12,800 ft) and in Oaxaca between 2,500 and 3,000 m (8,200 and 9,800 ft).

== Behavior ==
=== Movement ===
The two northern subspecies of blue-throated mountaingem, and possibly the northernmost of the nominate subspecies, migrate south in winter, but their exact locations are not known. A few individuals remain through winter at feeding stations in southeastern Arizona. The populations in central and southern Mexico are thought to withdraw to lower elevations in winter but this movement has not been fully defined.

=== Feeding ===
The blue-throated mountaingem forages for nectar at a wide variety of flowering plants. The species fed from vary considerably across the bird's wide north–south and elevational ranges. It is common at sugar-water feeders. It hovers to feed on nectar. In some areas it defends patches of large flowers but not those of smaller ones. In the breeding season (especially early when flowers are scarce) and in winter it also feeds on small arthropods. These are taken by hawking, in sustained flight, and by gleaning from bark and foliage. In winter it also feeds on sap from wells created by the Red-naped sapsucker (Syraphicus nuchalis).

=== Breeding ===
The blue-throated mountaingem's breeding seasons vary throughout its range. It begins in February in Veracruz, Mexico, and continues to September in some parts of its range. The earliest known egg laying in Arizona was in mid-Apr. In the higher elevations in Mexico laying begins in late May or June. Two clutches per season are common and sometimes three have been documented.

As with all hummingbirds, the female alone constructs the nest and raises the young. The nest is made from soft plant fibers cemented with spider silk. The exterior is camouflaged with green mosses where available; in drier habitats, moss-like dendroid lichens may be used, or the exterior may be left bare. It is typically attached to a tree branch or to roots and stems under natural overhangs. They are also commonly placed on human-made substrates such as a wire or nail under an eave or in a building. The female incubates the two white eggs for 17 to 19 days and fledging occurs 24 to 26 days after hatch.

=== Vocalization ===
Male blue-throated mountaingems sing two types of songs: a simple "peep song", which sounds like a squeaky wheel lasting about one second, and a quiet but complex "whisper song" lasting as long as eight seconds. The female is also reported to sing during the breeding season to attract the attention of males. The male song differs in several respects from that of oscine birds in that it uses sharp atonal forceful trills and clicks, and has an unusually large vocal range of 1.8 to 30 kHz. Males sing from a perch, usually a bare twig high in a tree. Females vocalize near the nest when alarmed or when disputing a nectar source.

The bird also uses ultrasonic vibrations which are not for communication, but possibly serve to flush out and disorient its insect prey.

== Status ==
The IUCN has assessed the blue-throated mountaingem as being of least concern. It has a very large range and its population of about 2,000,000 mature individuals is believed to be stable. No immediate threats have been identified. The species is highly tolerant of human activity. However, in the northern part of its range it is uncommon and found in only a few narrow canyons, so damage to those areas by fire or human alteration may affect it. Except in the US, little of its range has formal protection.
