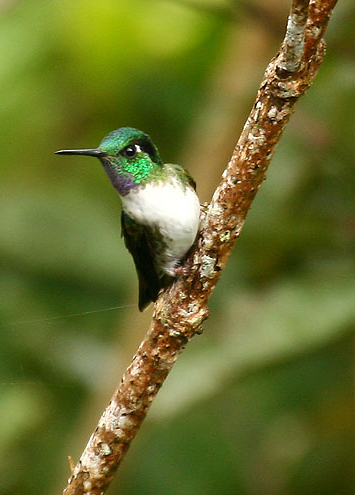

Conservation status
- Least Concern (IUCN 3.1)
- CITES Appendix II (CITES)

Scientific classification
- Kingdom: Animalia
- Phylum: Chordata
- Class: Aves
- Clade: Strisores
- Order: Apodiformes
- Family: Trochilidae
- Genus: Lampornis
- Species: L. hemileucus

Binomial name
- Lampornis hemileucus (Salvin, 1865)

= White-bellied mountaingem =

Species of hummingbird

The white-bellied mountaingem or white-bellied mountain-gem (Lampornis hemileucus) is a species of hummingbird in tribe Lampornithini of subfamily Trochilinae. It is found in Costa Rica and Panama.

== Taxonomy and systematics ==
The white-bellied mountaingem is monotypic. There is some evidence that it does not belong in genus Lampornis.

== Description ==
The white-bellied mountaingem is 10 to 11 cm (3.9 to 4.3 in) long. Males weigh about 6.2 g (0.22 oz) and females 5.1 g (0.18 oz). Both sexes have a medium-length black bill, a long white stripe behind the eye, and pinkish feet. Adult males' face and crown are glittering green, much of the rest of the upperparts bronzy green, and the uppertail coverts bronzy. The tail is also bronzy, with dusky gray bands near the end of the outer feathers. The gorget is blue-violet and the rest of the underparts white with green speckles along the sides. Adult females are similar, but the face and crown are less glittering and the throat is white with green speckles. Juveniles of both sexes have rusty fringes on the green feathers; males have a dull bronze gorget.

== Distribution and habitat ==
The white-bellied mountaingem is found on the Caribbean slope from north-central Costa Rica south and east into western Panama as far as Veraguas Province, and also locally on the Pacific slope in Panama. It inhabits the canopy of cool and very wet subtropical forest and also occurs at the shrub level at the forest edge and in gaps and clearings. It mostly shuns secondary forest and other semi-open landscapes.

== Behavior ==
=== Movement ===
At least in Costa Rica, the white-bellied mountaingem breeds between 700 and 1,400 m (2,300 and 4,600 ft) of elevation and after breeding descends to between 400 and 600 m (1,300 and 2,000 ft).

=== Feeding ===
The white-bellied mountaingem forages for nectar in flowering trees and shrubs, and is especially partial to epiphytes of family Ericaceae and genus Columnea. It is aggressive when feeding; males dominate most other hummingbirds, even larger ones, at clumps of flowering epiphytes. In addition to nectar, it also feeds on insects captured by hawking; females sometimes glean arthropods from foliage.

=== Breeding ===
The white-bellied mountaingem breeds between August and March in Costa Rica. Its nest and details of its breeding phenology have not been described.

=== Vocalization ===
The white-bellied mountaingem's song is "a medley of squeaks, dry or liquid trills, and sputtering notes." When chasing it makes "squeaky sputtering trills". Other calls include "a repeated, somewhat nasal 'deep' [and] rattling sequences 'de-de-drrrrr'."

== Status ==
The IUCN has assessed the white-bellied mountaingem as being of Least Concern, though it has a somewhat restricted range and its population size and trend are not known. It is considered locally common and much of its habitat remains intact, especially in three Costa Rican national parks.
