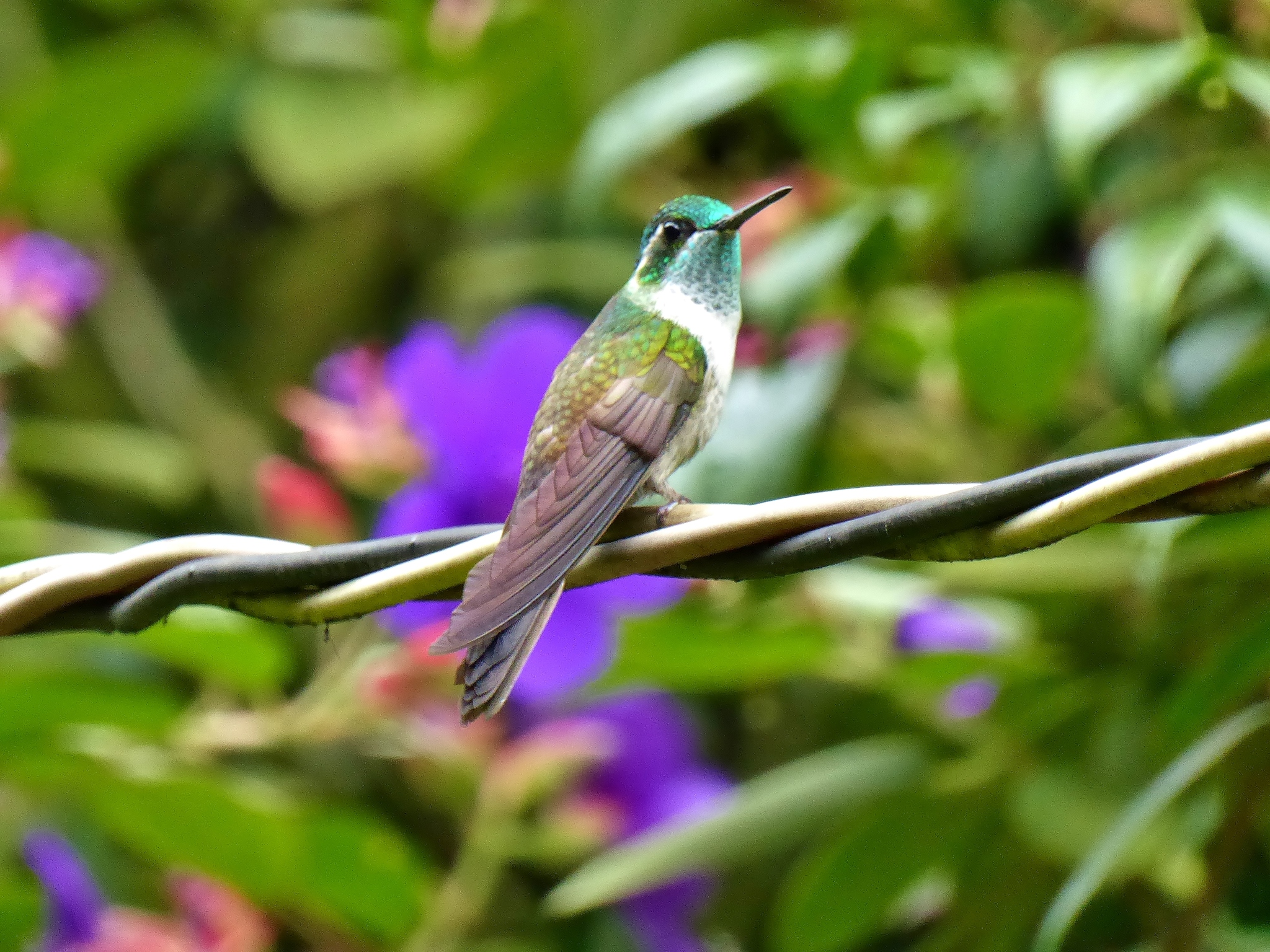
- male
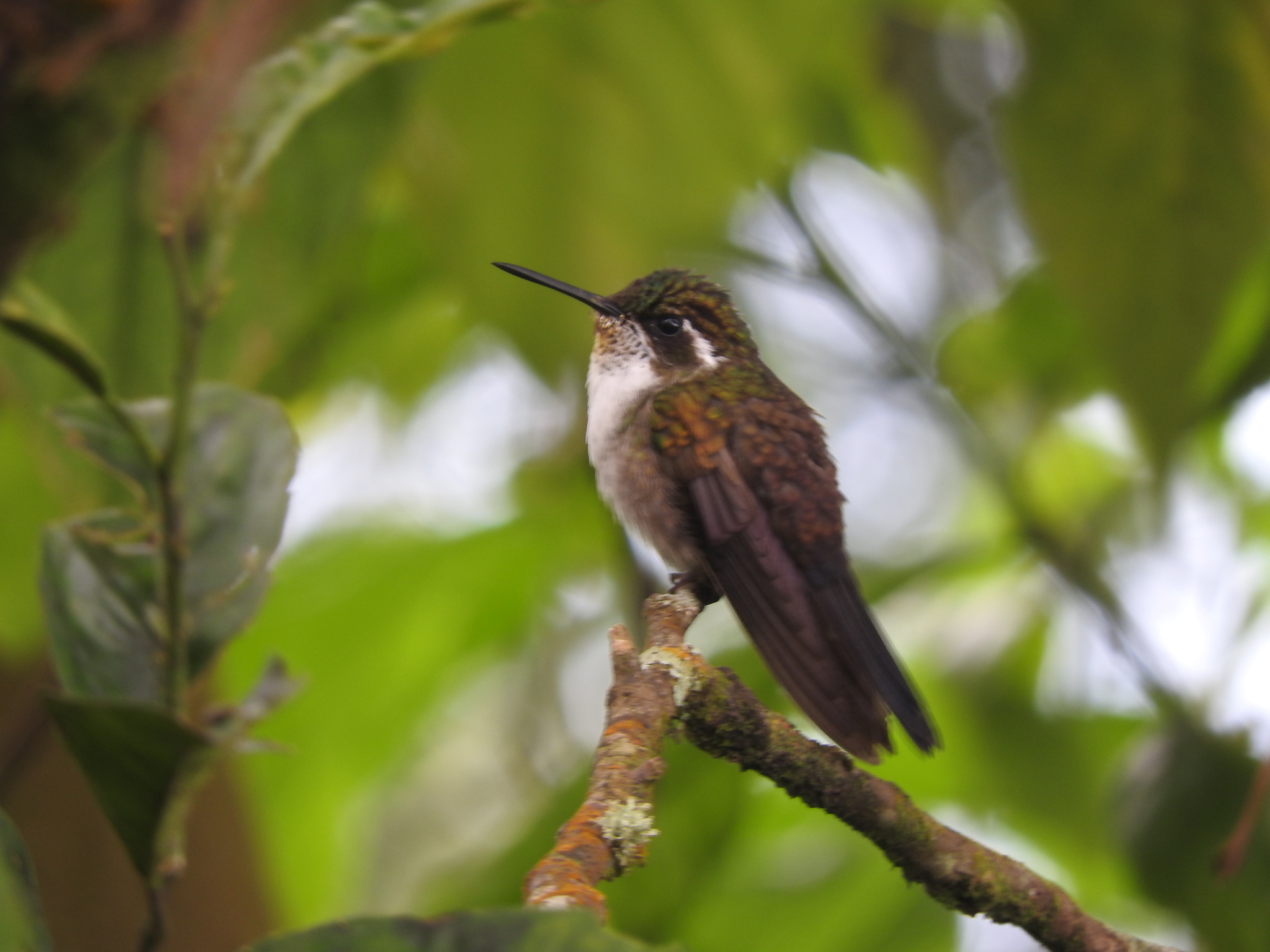
- female

Conservation status
- Least Concern (IUCN 3.1)
- CITES Appendix II

Scientific classification
- Kingdom: Animalia
- Phylum: Chordata
- Class: Aves
- Order: Apodiformes
- Family: Trochilidae
- Genus: Lampornis
- Species: L. viridipallens

Binomial name
- Lampornis viridipallens (Bourcier & Mulsant, 1846)

Synonyms
- Delattria viridipallens

= Green-throated mountaingem =

Species of hummingbird

The green-throated mountaingem or green-throated mountain-gem (Lampornis viridipallens) is a species of hummingbird in tribe Lampornithini of subfamily Trochilinae. It is found in El Salvador, Guatemala, Honduras, and Mexico.

== Taxonomy and systematics ==
The green-throated mountaingem has sometimes been considered conspecific with its close relative the green-breasted mountaingem (Lampornis sybillae). It has these four subspecies:

- L. v. amadoni Rowley, JS (1968)
- L. v. ovandensis Brodkorb (1939)
- L. v. viridipallens Bourcier & Mulsant (1846)
- L. v. nubivagus Dickey & Van Rossem (1929)

Subspecies L. v. ovandensis differs very little from the nominate L. v. viridipallens and might better be merged with it.

== Description ==
The green-throated mountaingem is 11 to 12 cm (4.3 to 4.7 in) long and weighs about 5.4 g (0.19 oz). Both sexes of all subspecies have a straight black bill, a white stripe behind the eye above a dark cheek, and a slightly forked tail.

Adult males of the nominate subspecies have green upperparts with a bronzy rump and bluish black uppertail coverts. Their central tail feathers are black and the rest pale gray. Their throat is white with bluish green spots, their breast white, their belly grayish with green spots on the sides and flanks, and their undertail coverts dusky gray. Adult females have emerald green upperparts and an unspotted white throat but are otherwise like the male. Juveniles are like adult females but with a pale buffy throat.

Subspecies L. v. amadoni is darker overall than the nominate and is less bronzy on the rump. L. v. ovandensis differs from the nominate only in having a lesser extent of green spots on the sides and flanks. L. v. nubivagus has dark green upperparts and an intensely bronze rump.

== Distribution and habitat ==
The subspecies of green-throated mountaingem are found thus:

- L. v. amadoni, the Sierra Atravesada in southeastern Oaxaca, Mexico
- L. v. ovandensis, Mexico's Chiapas state and northwestern Guatemala
- L. v. viridipallens, eastern Guatemala, extreme northern El Salvador, and western Honduras
- L. v. nubivagus, Santa Ana Volcano in western El Salvador

The species inhabits the interior and edges of humid evergreen and pine-oak forest. In elevation it ranges between 900 and 2,700 m (3,000 and 8,900 ft).

== Behavior ==
=== Movement ===
The green-throated mountaingem is sedentary.

=== Feeding ===
The green-throated mountaingem forages for nectar at all levels of the forest. Details of the plants it visits have not been described. In addition to nectar it also feeds on insects captured by hawking.

=== Breeding ===
The green-throated mountaingem is known to breed in March, April, June, and July, but no other information about its breeding phenology has been documented.

=== Vocalization ===
What is thought to be the green-throated mountaingem's song is "a complex warble of squeaky notes and buzzy, gurgling trills, 'tsee-tsee-glr-tsee-glr-tsee-glugluglugluglu-glr-glr-tsee'." Its calls include "a hard, buzzy 'zzrrt', a short 'tsik' and high-pitched thin 'see'."

== Status ==
The IUCN has assessed the green-throated mountaingem as being of Least Concern, though its population size is unknown and believed to be decreasing. No immediate threats have been identified. It is considered generally common and is found in some protected areas. However, it has a restricted range and "parts of [its] habitat are under threat of deforestation [and it is] not known to tolerate man-made habitats."
