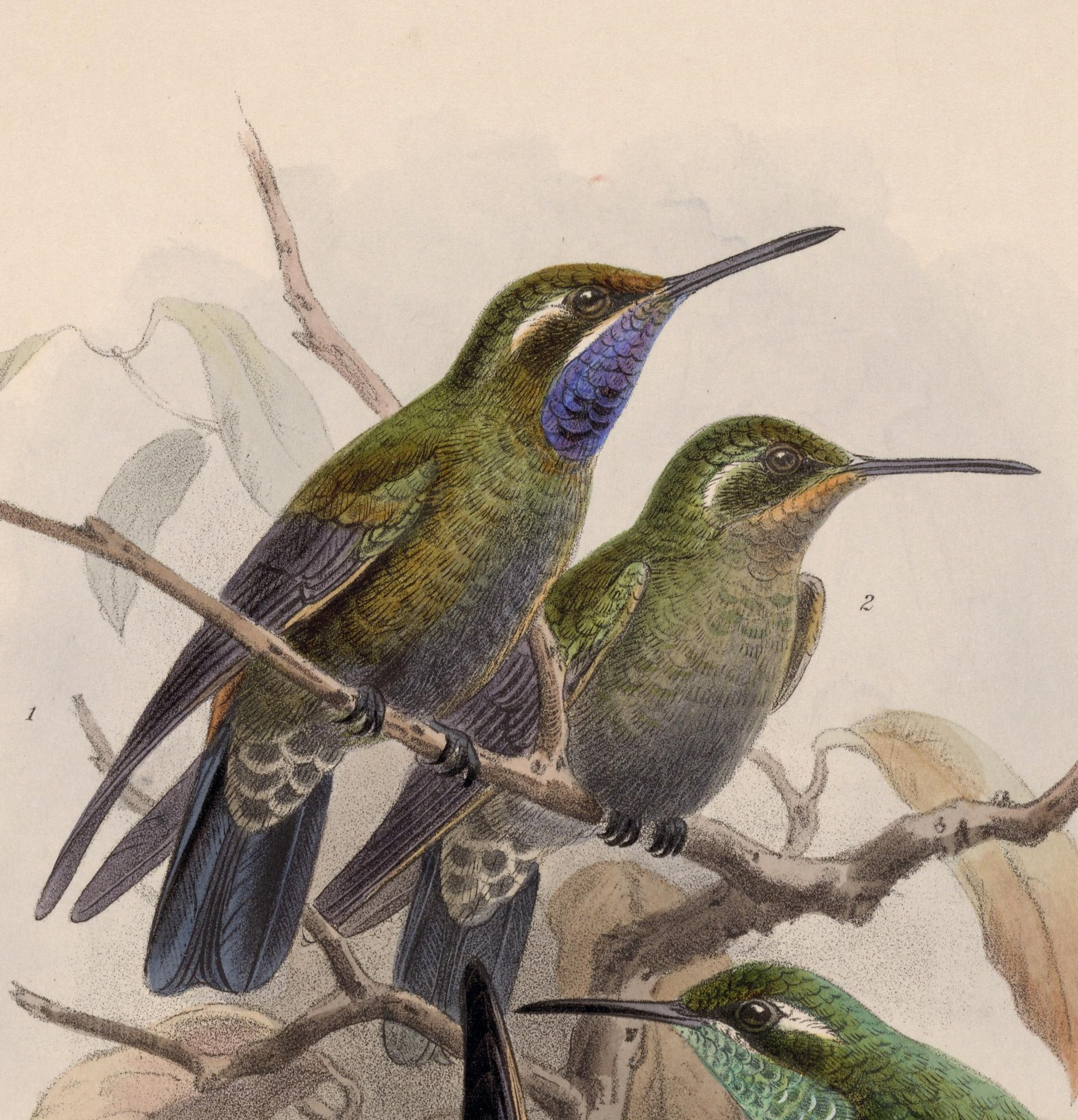

Conservation status
- Least Concern (IUCN 3.1)
- CITES Appendix II (CITES)

Scientific classification
- Kingdom: Animalia
- Phylum: Chordata
- Class: Aves
- Clade: Strisores
- Order: Apodiformes
- Family: Trochilidae
- Genus: Lampornis
- Species: L. amethystinus

Binomial name
- Lampornis amethystinus Swainson, 1827
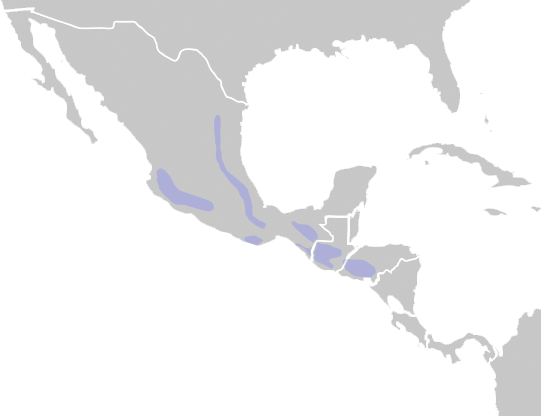

= Amethyst-throated mountaingem =

Amethyst-throated Mountain-gem

Species of hummingbird

The amethyst-throated mountaingem (Lampornis amethystinus), also called amethyst-throated mountain-gem or amethyst-throated hummingbird, is a species of hummingbird in tribe Lampornithini of subfamily Trochilinae. It is found in El Salvador, Guatemala, Honduras, and Mexico.

== Taxonomy and systematics ==
The amethyst-throated mountaingem has five subspecies:

- L. a. amethystinus Swainson (1827)
- L. a. margaritae Salvin & Godman (1889)
- L. a. circumventris A.R. Phillips (1966)
- L. a. salvini Ridgway (1908)
- L. a. nobilis Griscom (1932)

== Description ==
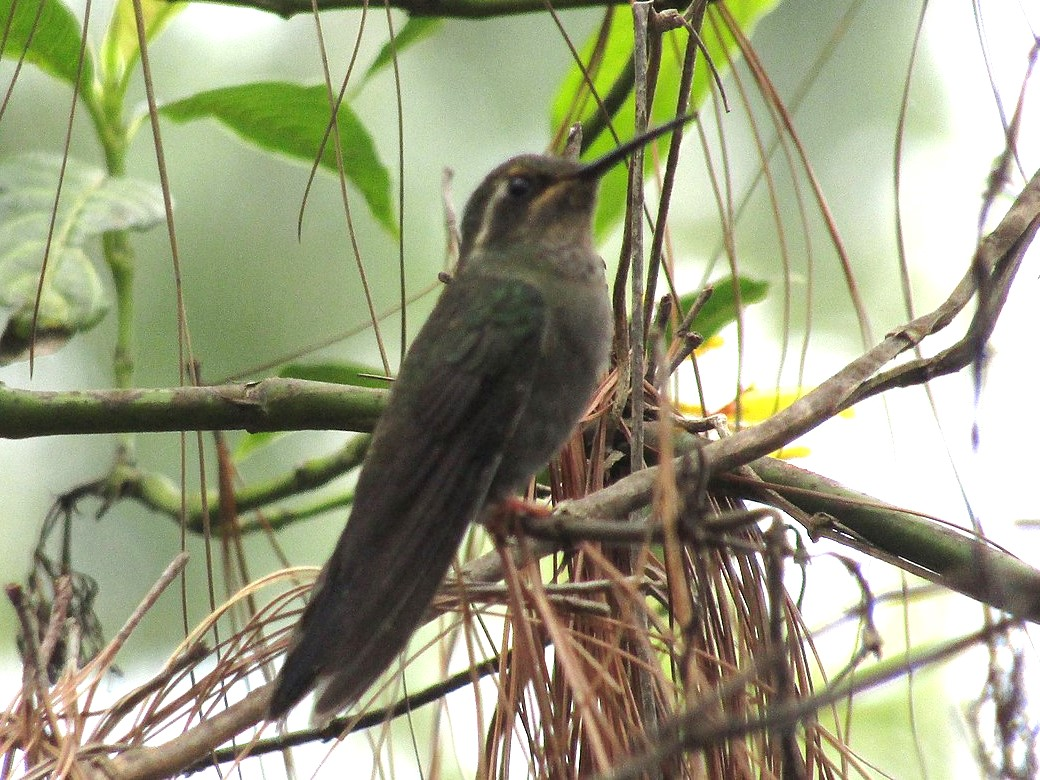
Female

The amethyst-throated mountaingem is 11.5 to 12.5 cm (4.5 to 4.9 in) long. Males weigh 5 to 7.8 g (0.18 to 0.28 oz) and females 5 to 5.8 g (0.18 to 0.20 oz). Both sexes of all subspecies have a medium-length straight black bill, dark auriculars, a whitish stripe behind the eye, and a broad slightly forked tail.

Adult males of the nominate subspecies have a dark green crown and back, a bronze rump, and blackish uppertail coverts. The tail is black with gray tips on the outer feathers. It has a brilliant rosy pink gorget. The breast and belly are dusky gray and the undertail coverts pale buff. The female is almost the same but has a cinnamon throat. Juveniles are similar to females but males may have a few pink feathers on the throat.

Subspecies L. a. circumventris and L. a. salvini are almost indistinguishable from the nominate. Males of L. a. nobilis have more bronzy green upperparts than the nominate, a purple rump, and purplish-black uppertail coverts. The gorget is reddish purple and the underparts dark smoke-gray. Females are also more bronzy above and darker below than the nominate, and have a duller and darker cinnamon throat.

Subspecies L. a. margaritae differs the most from the nominate. Both sexes are much darker overall and the male's gorget is violet to royal blue instead of the red to reddish purple of the other four subspecies. It possibly may be a separate species.

When compared to similar sister species, it appears the color differences between this and others was a relatively recent evolutionary occurrence.

== Distribution and habitat ==
The subspecies of amethyst-throated mountaingem are found thus:

- L. a. amethystinus, central and eastern Mexico from Nuevo León and Tamaulipas south to Veracruz and northern Oaxaca
- L. a. margaritae, southwestern Mexico from Nayarit and Jalisco south to Michoacán and western Oaxaca
- L. a. circumventris, Sierra de Miahuatlán in southwestern Oaxaca
- L. a. salvini, from Chiapas in southern Mexico south through Guatemala into El Salvador
- L. a. nobilis, Honduras

There are two records north of Mexico, a male in Saguenay–Lac-Saint-Jean, Quebec, in July 2016 and a male in the Davis Mountains of Texas in October 2016.

The amethyst-throated mountaingem inhabits the interior and edges of montane evergreen and pine-oak forest. In Mexico in ranges in elevation from 900 to 3,000 m (3,000 to 9,800 ft).

== Behavior ==
=== Movement ===
The movements of the amethyst-throated mountaingem, if any, have not been described.

=== Feeding ===
The amethyst-throated mountaingem feeds mostly on nectar, from a wide variety of flowering plants. It tends to feed in the lower and mid-story of the forest by trap-lining, visiting a circuit of nectar sources rather than defending patches of them. It also feeds on insects. They are subordinate to larger hummingbirds but dominant over smaller ones.

=== Breeding ===
The amethyst-throated mountaingem is usually not territorial, but will sometimes defend a territory. Males display to females during mornings and evenings and perform an aerial display if a female is present. It flies parallel to the ground in circles, dives towards the female, returns to its perch, and repeats it up to five times. The female builds the nest, a deep cup of plant fibers bound with spider silk and decorated with moss and lichen. It is typically placed about 1.4 to 2.4 m (5 to 8 ft) above the ground on a drooping branch. The incubation length and time to fledging are not known.

=== Vocalization ===
The amethyst-throated mountaingem's song is "a quiet chatter made up of a two-syllable introductory phrase followed by a mixture of notes arranged into very complex vocalizations." It may have up to nine complex phrases, and both males and females sing. Both sexes also make a feeding call, "a persistent buzzing sound". Males make a territorial call, "a series of short, rapid clicking sounds" and a display call, "a series of 7 - 10 shrill whistle notes".

== Status ==
The IUCN has assessed the amethyst-throated mountaingem as being of Least Concern, though its population size is not known and believed to be decreasing. No specific threats have been identified. "Human activity has little short-term direct effect on the Amethyst-throated Hummingbird, other than the local effects of habitat destruction."
