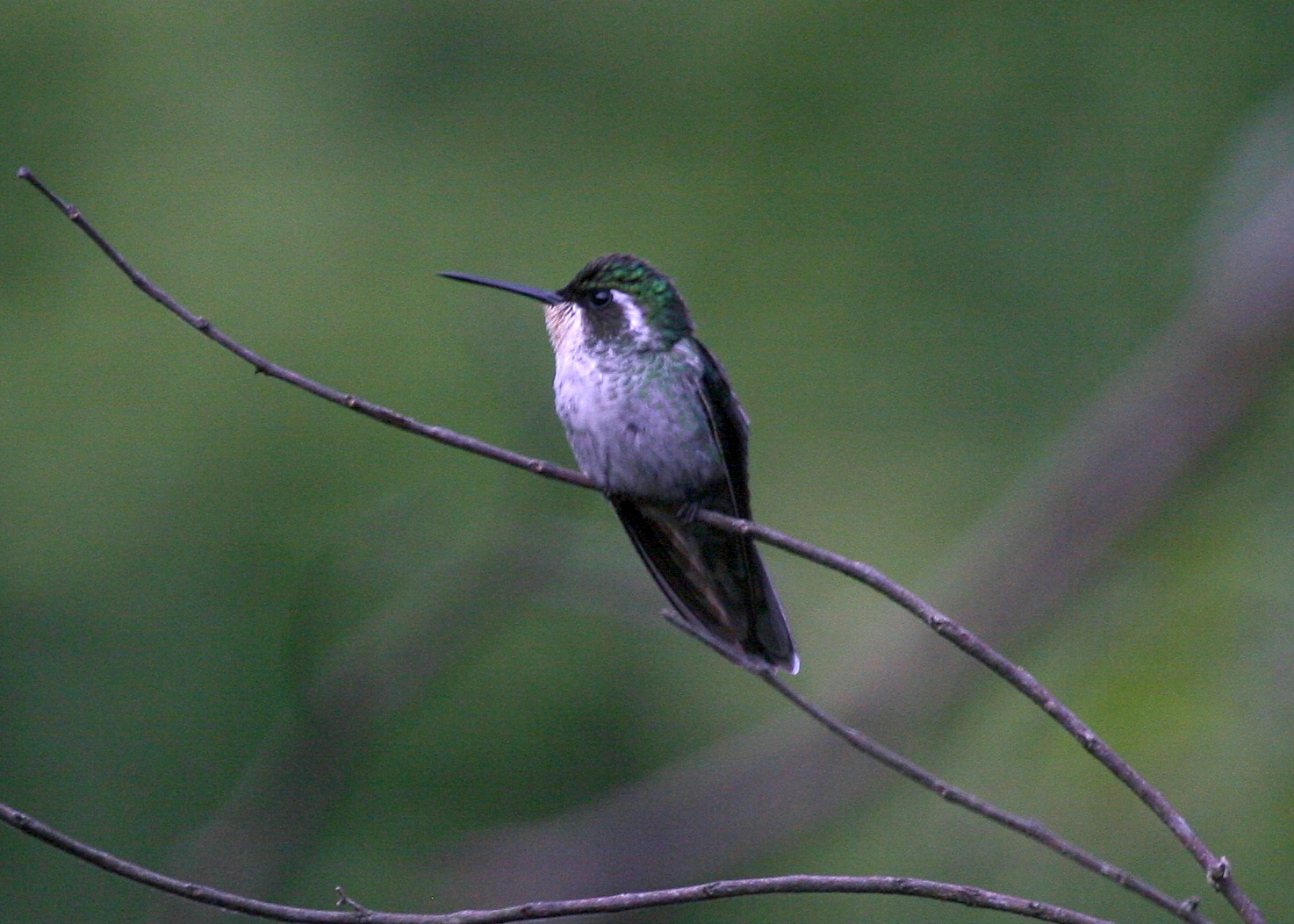
- A female

Conservation status
- Least Concern (IUCN 3.1)
- CITES Appendix II (CITES)

Scientific classification
- Kingdom: Animalia
- Phylum: Chordata
- Class: Aves
- Clade: Strisores
- Order: Apodiformes
- Family: Trochilidae
- Genus: Lampornis
- Species: L. sybillae

Binomial name
- Lampornis sybillae (Salvin & Godman, 1892)

= Green-breasted mountaingem =

Species of hummingbird

The green-breasted mountaingem or green-breasted mountain-gem (Lampornis sybillae) is a species of hummingbird in tribe Lampornithini of subfamily Trochilinae. It is found in Honduras and Nicaragua.

== Taxonomy and systematics ==
The green-breasted mountaingem has sometimes been considered conspecific with its close relative the green-throated mountaingem (Lampornis viridipallens) or may form a superspecies with it. It is monotypic.

== Description ==
The green-breasted mountaingem is about 10 to 11 cm (3.9 to 4.3 in) long and weighs about 4 to 7 g (0.14 to 0.25 oz); males are larger than females. It has a medium-length straight black bill. Adults of both sexes have deep metallic grass green upperparts with some bronze on the rump and black uppertail coverts. They have a white stripe that curves down behind the eye and deep metallic grass green cheeks with a thin white stripe below them.

Adult males' underparts are also mostly metallic grass green, with white or grayish white margins on the feathers. Their lower belly, vent area, and leg tufts are white. Their inner undertail coverts are green with white edges and the outer ones dusky gray with wide white edges. Their central tail feathers are grayish black and the others pale gray to grayish white with dusky margins.

Adult females have a buff chin and throat and grayish white underparts with metallic green on the sides of the breast. The outermost two pairs of tail feathers are white or grayish white with a dusky gray bar near the end; neither have the male's dusky margins. Some individuals have a green sheen on the upperside of the central tail feathers, which males never have.

Juveniles have dark green mottling on their throat and buffy to cinnamon tips on the upperparts' feathers. Older immature birds begin to show the adults' throat and tail colors.

== Distribution and habitat ==
The green-breasted mountaingem is found in central and eastern Honduras and northwestern Nicaragua. It inhabits the interior and edges of humid evergreen and pine-oak forest and also the transition zone from the latter into cloudforest. In elevation it generally ranges between 1,400 and 2,200 m (4,600 and 7,200 ft), though some authors extend that range to between 750 and 2,400 m (2,500 and 7,900 ft).

== Behavior ==
=== Movement ===
The green-breasted mountaingem is thought to make seasonal elevational movements.

=== Feeding ===
The green-breasted mountaingem feeds on nectar and small insects and spiders, but details of it diet and foraging techniques are lacking.

=== Breeding ===
Almost nothing is known about the green-breasted mountaingem's breeding phenology. Data suggest that its breeding season is approximately November to February.

=== Vocalization ===
The green-breasted mountaingem's song is "a soft, scratchy warble...often with a trill at the end". Males usually sing from hidden perches, though sometimes in the open or in flight. Both sexes give "short, buzzy 'shrrrt' calls" while feeding.

== Status ==
The IUCN has assessed the green-breasted mountaingem as being of Least Concern, though its population size is unknown and believed to be decreasing. No immediate threats have been identified. "[A]ppropriate habitat in the Green-breasted Mountain-gem's small and patchy distribution is likely to further decrease in size" due to global warming.
