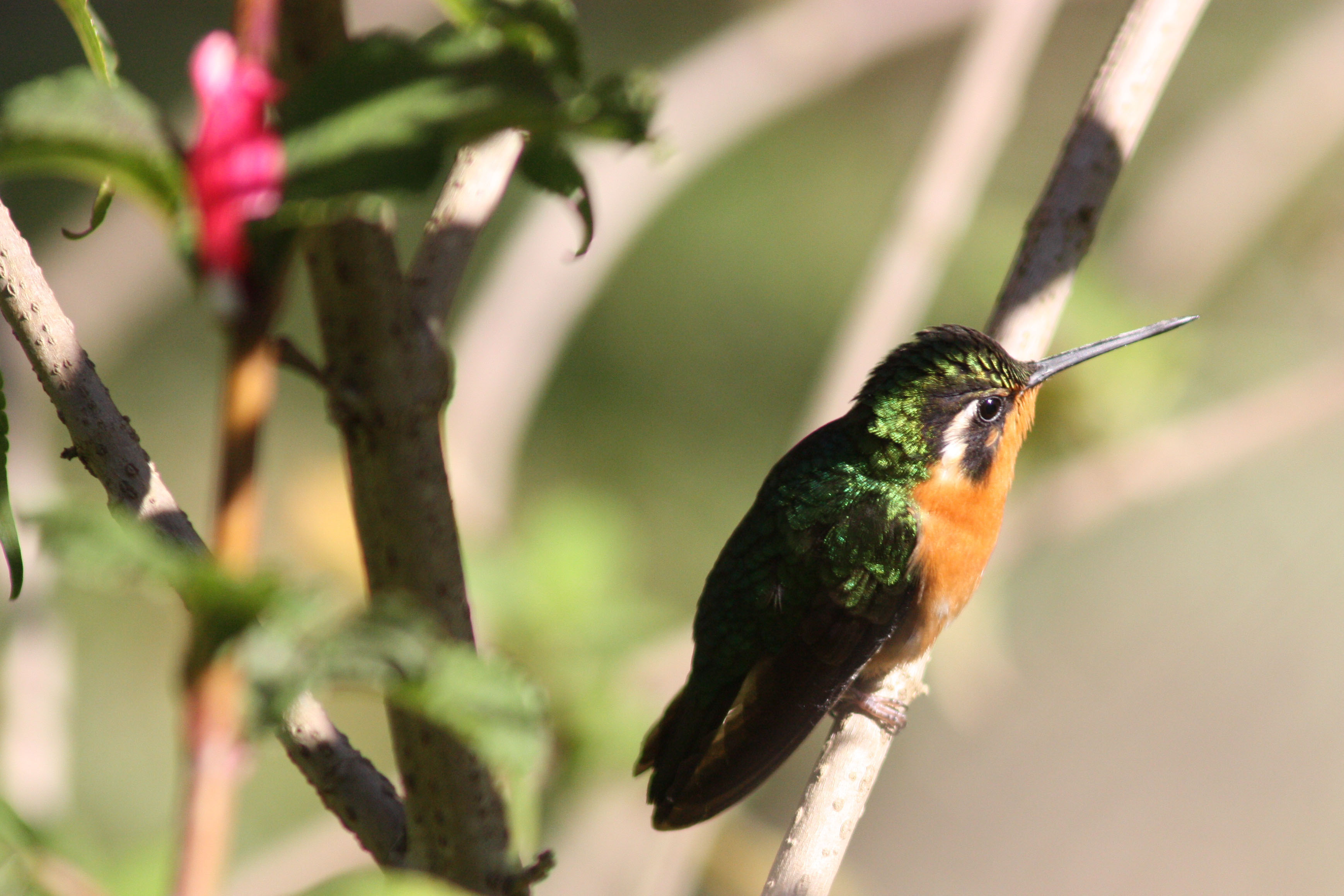
- Purple-throated Mountaingem (Lampornis calolaemus) ♀ in Costa Rica

Scientific classification
- Kingdom: Animalia
- Phylum: Chordata
- Class: Aves
- Order: Apodiformes
- Family: Trochilidae
- Tribe: Lampornithini
- Genus: Lampornis; Swainson, 1827

Type species
- Lampornis amethystinus Swainson, 1827

Species
- 7, see text

= Mountaingem =

Genus of birds

Mountaingems are a genus of hummingbirds, Lampornis, which inhabit mountainous regions from the south-western United States to the Isthmus of Panama.

These are medium-sized to large (10–13 cm) hummingbirds with shortish slightly curved black bills. The males typically have green upperparts and a brightly coloured throat, which is a dull colour in the female. The females of some species also may differ significantly from the males in other plumage features.

The female mountaingem is entirely responsible for nest building and incubation. She lays two white eggs in a deep plant-fibre cup nest. Incubation takes 15–19 days, and fledging another 20–26.

The food of this genus is nectar, taken from a variety of small flowers. Like other hummingbirds, mountaingems also takes small insects as an essential source of protein.

== Taxonomy ==
The genus Lampornis was introduced in 1827 by the English zoologist William Swainson to accommodate a single new species, Lampornis amethystinus, the amethyst-throated mountaingem. This is the type species by monotypy. The genus name combines Ancient Greek λαμπη/lampē meaning "torch" or "light" with ορνις/ornis, ορνιθος/ornithos meaning "bird".

6-8 species have been traditionally recognized, the main point of dispute being whether the southern forms which have fulvous-breasted females, found from Nicaragua to Panama, are one ("variable mountaingem"), two, or three species. Analysis of biogeography and mitochondrial and nuclear DNA sequences by Jaime García-Moreno and collaborators in 2006 has largely confirmed the arrangement and the suspected evolutionary relationships, but a few surprising results have emerged:

First, the white-throated mountaingem and the gray-tailed mountaingem are probably conspecific, but the purple-throated mountaingem seems to be a distinct species. However, the southern group has apparently evolved in a very short time and their conspicuous differences in appearance are not yet reflected in molecular divergence; as mates are of course chosen according to their appearance and not their molecular differences, it seems prudent to split the group according to throat color as advocated by the American Ornithological Society. However, the speciation process is ongoing.

Second, the exact relationship between the suspected sister taxa L. clemenciae and L. amethystinus, the northernmost species, is not as straightforward as assumed; it is not clear whether they are each other's close relatives or whether the blue-throated hummingbird is the oldest lineage of the genus, the amethyst-throated hummingbird diverging later. In addition, L. amethystinus may constitute two species, but not the violet-throated subspecies margaritae but the southernmost, red-throated forms are the most distinct ones.

Most puzzling, however, is the fact that the white-bellied mountaingem constantly failed to form a monophyletic group with the other taxa. These results suggest that it is better placed in the monotypic genus Oreopyra, the relationships of which need more study. It might be closely related to the fiery-throated hummingbird, but these two species are very different at least morphologically. The garnet-throated hummingbird, which is sometimes considered to be the closest relative of the mountaingems, is indeed not distantly related to the group, but closer to the Eugenes hummingbirds. It is intermediate in appearance between Lampornis and those species.

García-Moreno's team refrains to date the emergence of the genus because of the absence of fossils or other robust evidence. It can be assumed though that Lampornis was present at the closing of the Isthmus of Panama, about 3.8 MYA, and that by that time, the northernmost lineage(s) had already diverged.

These results are interesting, because they agree with a general trend for southern Mexican taxa (including to colonize the Isthmus and there form distinct species. Also, the Isthmus group of Lampornis provides a glimpse at an intermediate stage in evolution, with one form (L. calolaema) having recently evolved into a distinct species, while its white-throated relatives are in the process of splitting into two species but have not yet done so. mtDNA (which is inherited from the mother only) suggests that the purple-throated mountaingem still can form fertile hybrids with the white-throated forms and indeed not infrequently does so.

The genus contains seven species:

Genus Lampornis – Swainson, 1827 – seven species
Common name	Scientific name and subspecies	Range	Size and ecology	IUCN status and estimated population
Green-throated mountaingem Male Female	Lampornis viridipallens (Bourcier & Mulsant, 1846) Four subspecies: L. v. amadoni Rowley, JS (1968); L. v. ovandensis Brodkorb (1939); L. v. viridipallens Bourcier & Mulsant (1846); L. v. nubivagus Dickey & Van Rossem (1929)	El Salvador, Guatemala, Honduras, and Mexico.	Size: Habitat: Diet:	LC
Green-breasted mountaingem Female	Lampornis sybillae (Salvin & Godman, 1892)	Honduras and Nicaragua.	Size: Habitat: Diet:	LC
Amethyst-throated mountaingem Male Female	Lampornis amethystinus Swainson, 1827 Five subspecies: L. a. amethystinus Swainson (1827); L. a. margaritae Salvin & Godman (1889); L. a. circumventris A.R. Phillips (1966); L. a. salvini Ridgway (1908); L. a. nobilis Griscom (1932)	El Salvador, Guatemala, Honduras, and Mexico.	Size: Habitat: Diet:	LC
Blue-throated mountaingem Male Female	Lampornis clemenciae (Lesson, 1830) Three subspecies: L. c. clemenciae; L. c. phasmorus; L. c. bessophilus	United States and Mexico	Size: Habitat: Diet:	LC
White-bellied mountaingem	Lampornis hemileucus (Salvin, 1865)	Costa Rica and Panama	Size: Habitat: Diet:	LC
Purple-throated mountaingem Male Female	Lampornis calolaemus (Salvin, 1865) Three subspecies: L. c. calolaemus; L. c. pectoralis; L. c. homogenes	Costa Rica, Nicaragua, and Panama	Size: Habitat: Diet:	LC
White-throated mountaingem Male Female	Lampornis castaneoventris (Gould, 1851) Two subspecies: L. c. cinereicauda (Lawrence, GN, 1867); L. c. castaneoventris (Gould, J, 1851)	Costa Rica and Panama.	Size: Habitat: Diet:	LC
