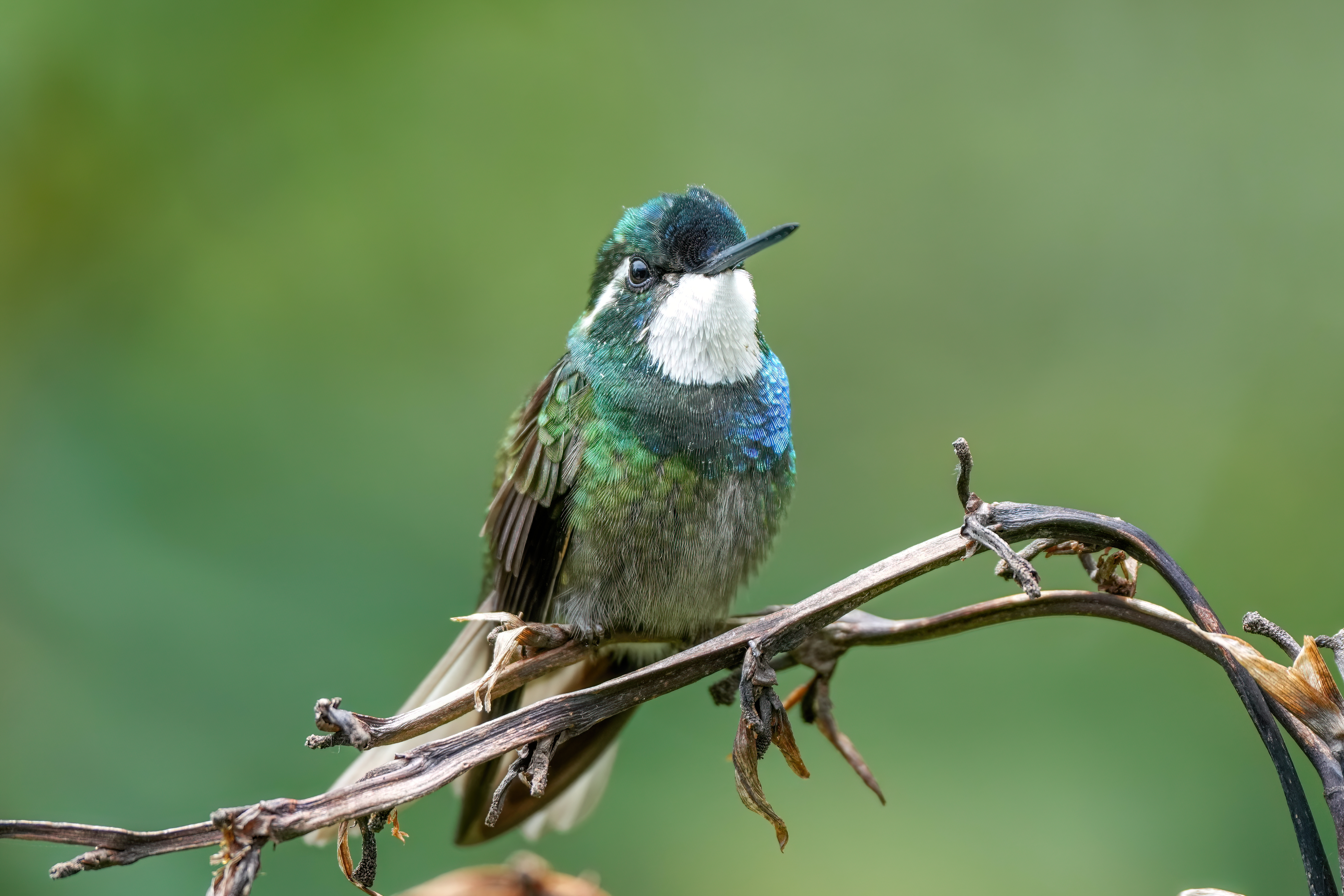

Conservation status
- Least Concern (IUCN 3.1)
- CITES Appendix II

Scientific classification
- Kingdom: Animalia
- Phylum: Chordata
- Class: Aves
- Order: Apodiformes
- Family: Trochilidae
- Genus: Lampornis
- Species: L. castaneoventris

Binomial name
- Lampornis castaneoventris (Gould, 1851)

Synonyms
- Lampornis castaneoventris castaneoventris (Gould, 1851)

= White-throated mountaingem =

Species of hummingbird

The white-throated mountaingem or white-throated mountain-gem (Lampornis castaneoventris) is a species of hummingbird in tribe Lampornithini of subfamily Trochilinae. It is endemic to the highlands of Costa Rica and Panama.

== Taxonomy ==
The white-throated mountaingem was formally described in 1851 by the English ornithologist John Gould based on a specimen collected by the Polish botanist Józef Warszewicz at an altidude of 1,800 m (6,000 ft) in the Cordillera de Chiriquí of western Panama. Gould coined the binomial name Trichilus castaneoventris where the specific epithet combines the Latin castaneus meaning "chestnut-brown" with venter, ventris meaning "belly". The white-throated mountaingem is now one of seven species placed in the genus Lampornis that was introduced in 1827 by the English zoologist William Swainson.

Two subspecies are recognised:

- L. c. cinereicauda (Lawrence, GN, 1867) – southern Costa Rica (Cordillera de Talamanca)
- L. c. castaneoventris (Gould, J, 1851) – montane forest of far western Panama

The subspecies L. c. cinereicauda has sometimes been considered a separate species, the gray-tailed mountaingem. In 1999 Karl-Ludwig Schuchmann in the Handbook of Birds of the World treated both the purple-throated mountaingem and the gray-tailed mountaingem as conspecific with the white-throated mountaingem, and used the English name, "Variable mountain-gem". Molecular genetic analyses using both mitochondrial and nuclear DNA sequences found that L. c. cinereicauda, L. c. castaneoventris and the purple-throated mountaingem (Lampornis calolaemus) formed a shallow unresolved clade.

== Description ==
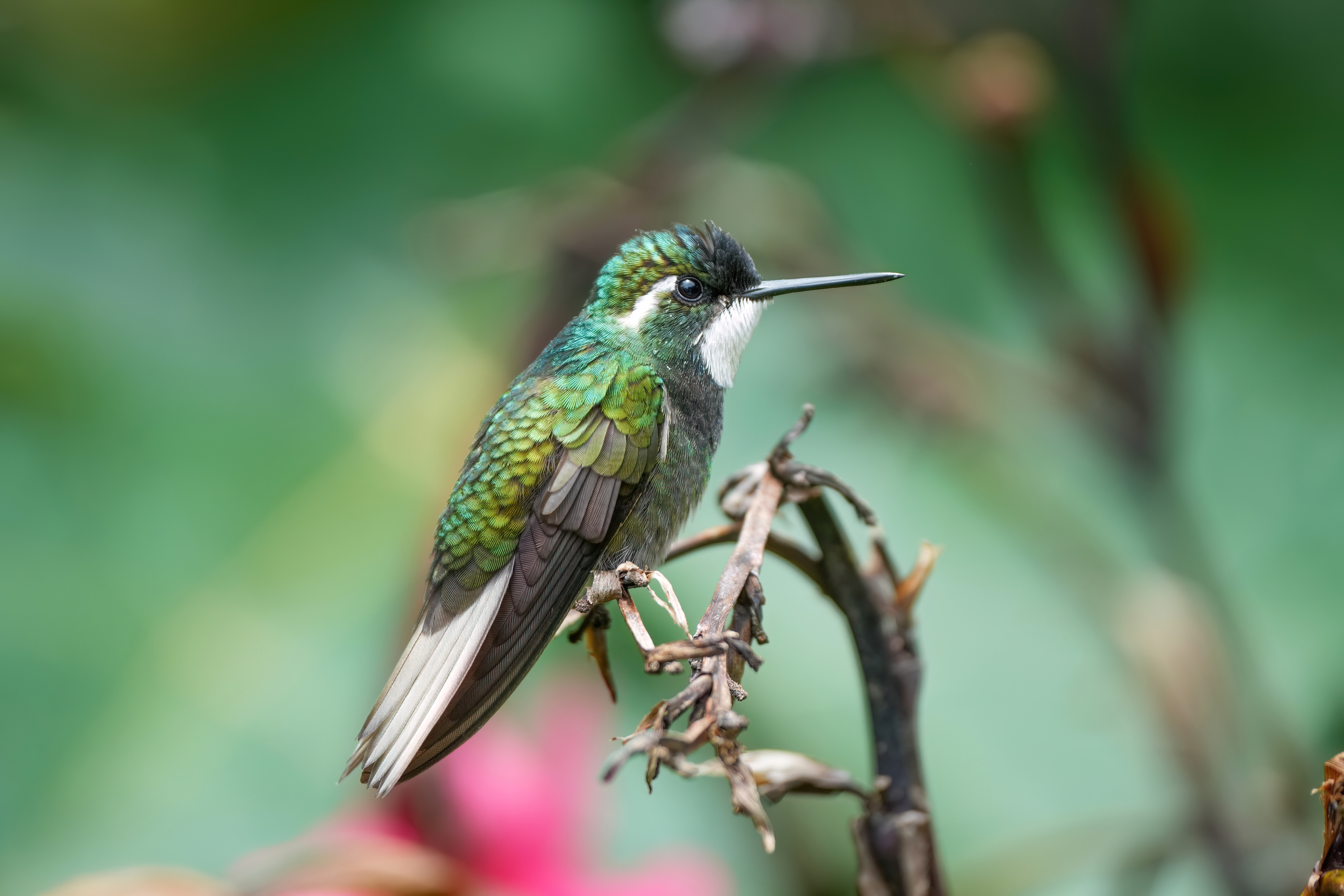
Male

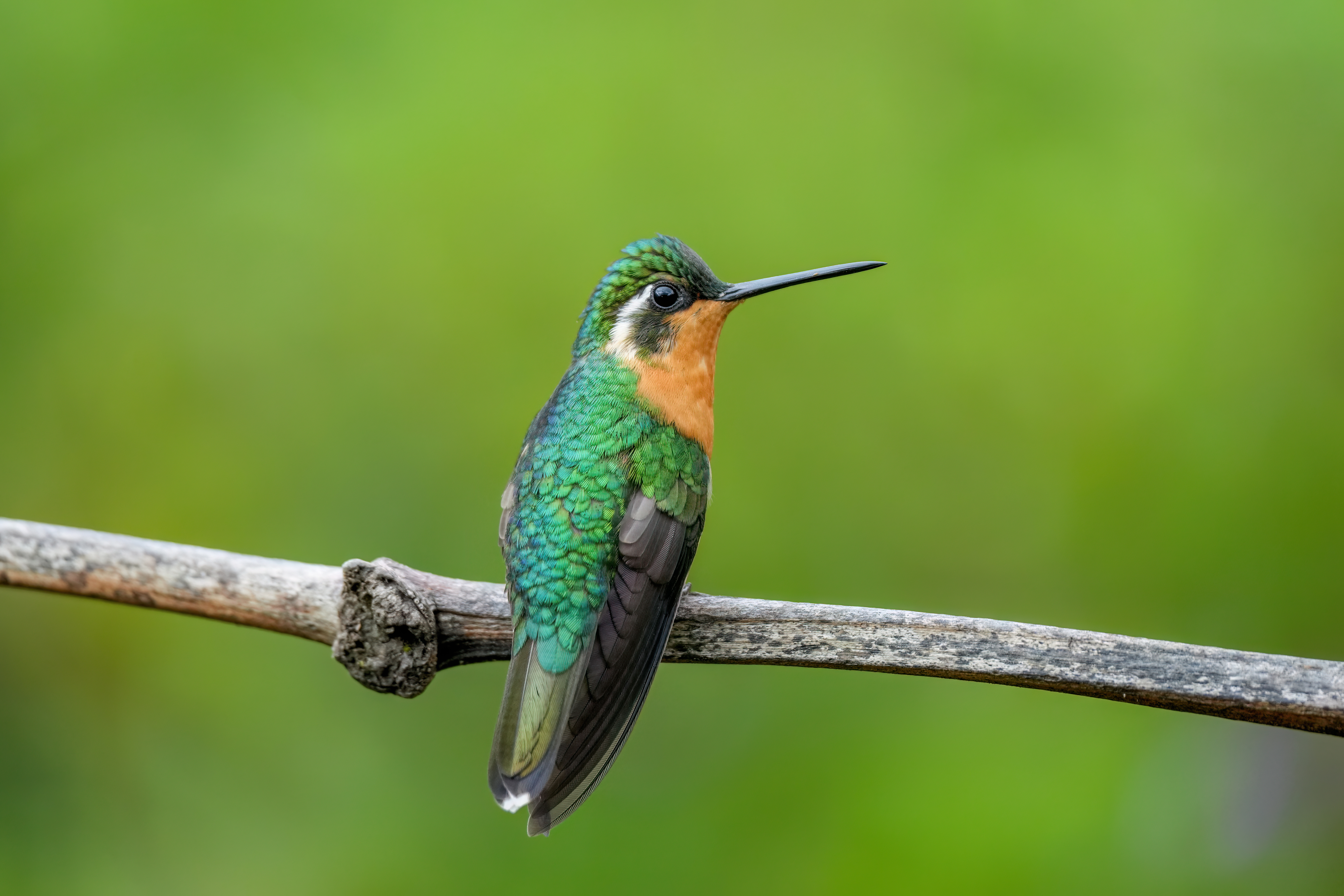
Female

The grey-tailed mountaingem is about 12 cm (4.7 in) long and weighs about 5 to 6 g (0.18 to 0.21 oz). It has a medium-length straight black bill, dark cheeks, and a white stripe behind the eye. Males have mostly dark bronzy green upperparts with an emerald green crown and a black to bluish black tail. Their chin and throat are white, the sides of the neck and upper breast bright green, and the lower breast and vent area dark gray. Females have entirely bright green upperparts. Their central tail feathers are dark metallic to bronze green and the outer ones paler. Their throat and belly are dark rufous and the undertail coverts are gray with white or buff edges.

== Distribution and habitat ==
The white-throated mountaingem is found only in the mountains of western Panama's Chiriquí Province and south-central Costa Rica. It inhabits the interior, edges, and shrubby clearings of oak forest and also gardens in communities near the forest. In elevation it ranges from 1,500 m (4,900 ft) up to timberline.

== Behavior ==
=== Movement ===
The white-throated mountaingem is a year-round resident.

=== Feeding ===
The white-throated mountaingem feeds on nectar from a variety of flowering plants. Males typically feed at epiphytes in the forest interior while females more often feed in shrubby areas. Males are territorial, defending flower patches. They are dominant over smaller hummingbirds and subordinate to larger ones like the fiery-throated hummingbird (Panterpe insignis). The species also feeds on small arthropods gleaned from foliage.

=== Breeding ===
The white-throated mountaingem's breeding season spans from October to April. Its nest is a cup of fine fibers with moss and some lichen on the outside. The incubation length and time to fledging are not known.

=== Vocalization ===
The white-throated mountaingem makes high pitched calls described as "ziit or ziip" and also "a 'sputtery, bubbly' song".

== Status ==
The IUCN has assessed the white-throated mountaingem as being of Least Concern, though it has a small range and its population size and trend are unknown. It is considered common. However, "this hummingbird is potentially threatened by human activities" such as deforestation for timber and agriculture.
