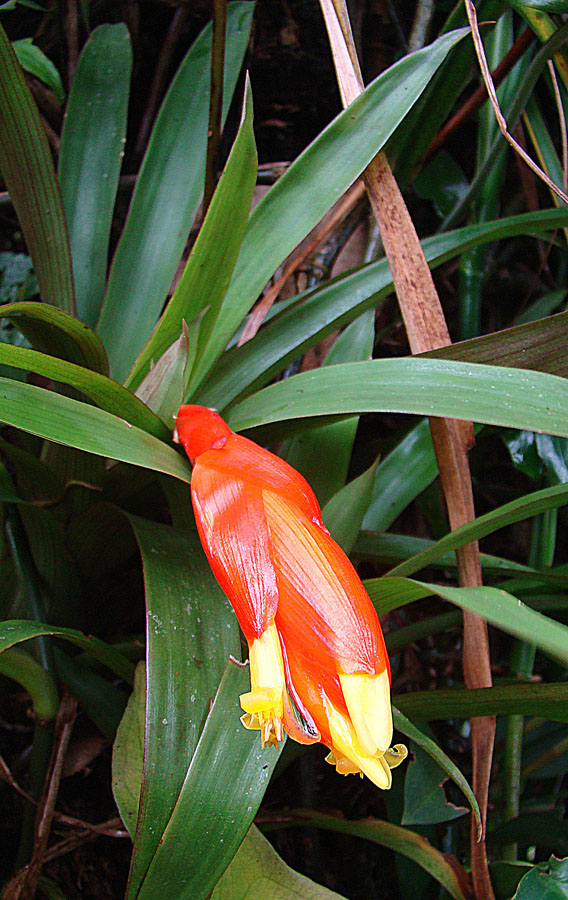

Scientific classification
- Kingdom: Plantae
- Clade: Embryophytes
- Clade: Tracheophytes
- Clade: Spermatophytes
- Clade: Angiosperms
- Clade: Monocots
- Clade: Commelinids
- Order: Poales
- Family: Bromeliaceae
- Genus: Guzmania
- Species: G. nicaraguensis

Binomial name
- Guzmania nicaraguensis Mez & C.F.Baker

= Guzmania nicaraguensis =

Species of flowering plant

Guzmania nicaraguensis is a species of flowering plant in the family Bromeliaceae. This species is native to Central America (all countries except El Salvador) and Mexico (Veracruz, Oaxaca, Chiapas).
