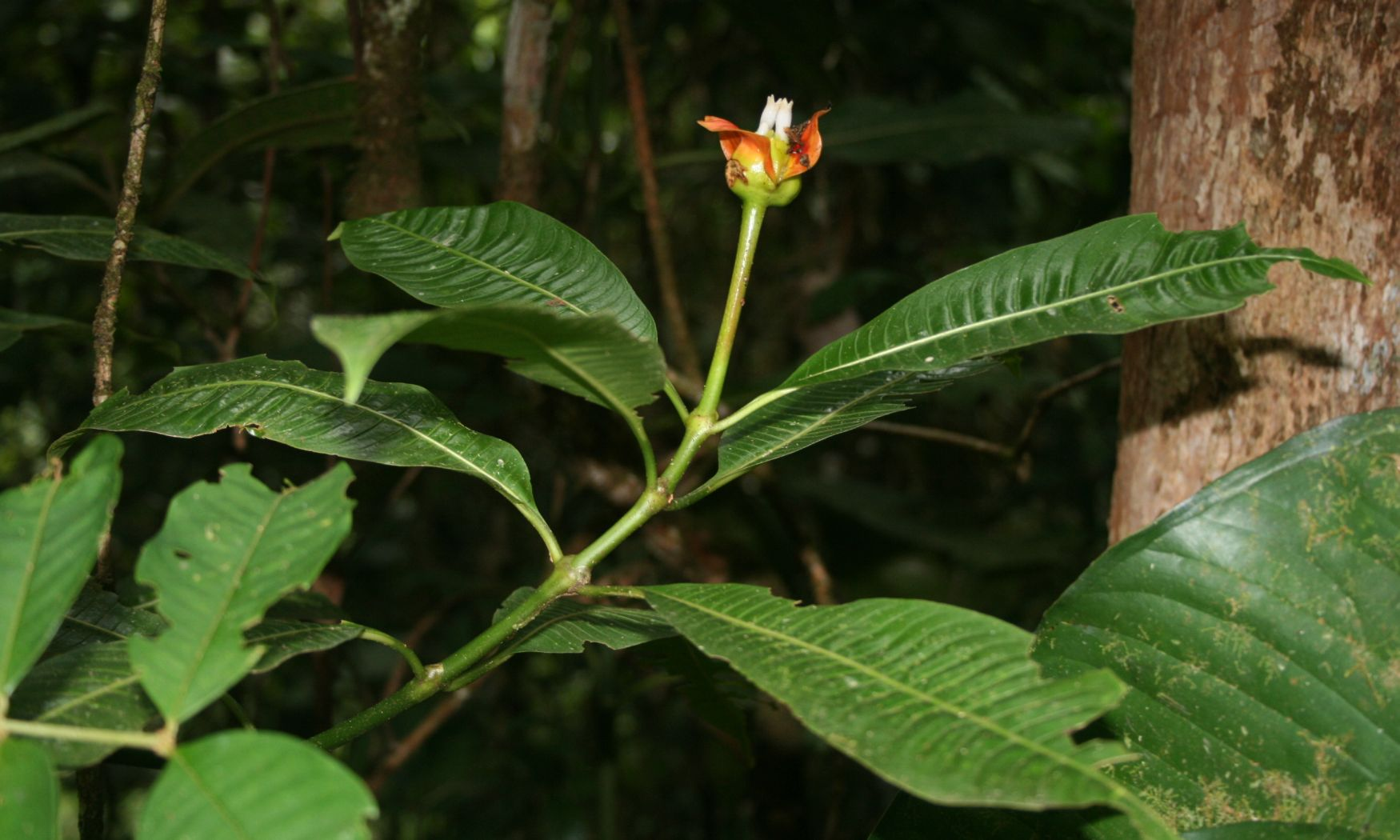

Scientific classification
- Kingdom: Plantae
- Clade: Embryophytes
- Clade: Tracheophytes
- Clade: Spermatophytes
- Clade: Angiosperms
- Clade: Eudicots
- Clade: Asterids
- Order: Gentianales
- Family: Rubiaceae
- Genus: Palicourea
- Species: P. elata

Binomial name
- Palicourea elata (Sw.) Borhidi

Synonyms
- Psychotria elata (Sw.) Hammel

= Palicourea elata =

Species of flowering plant

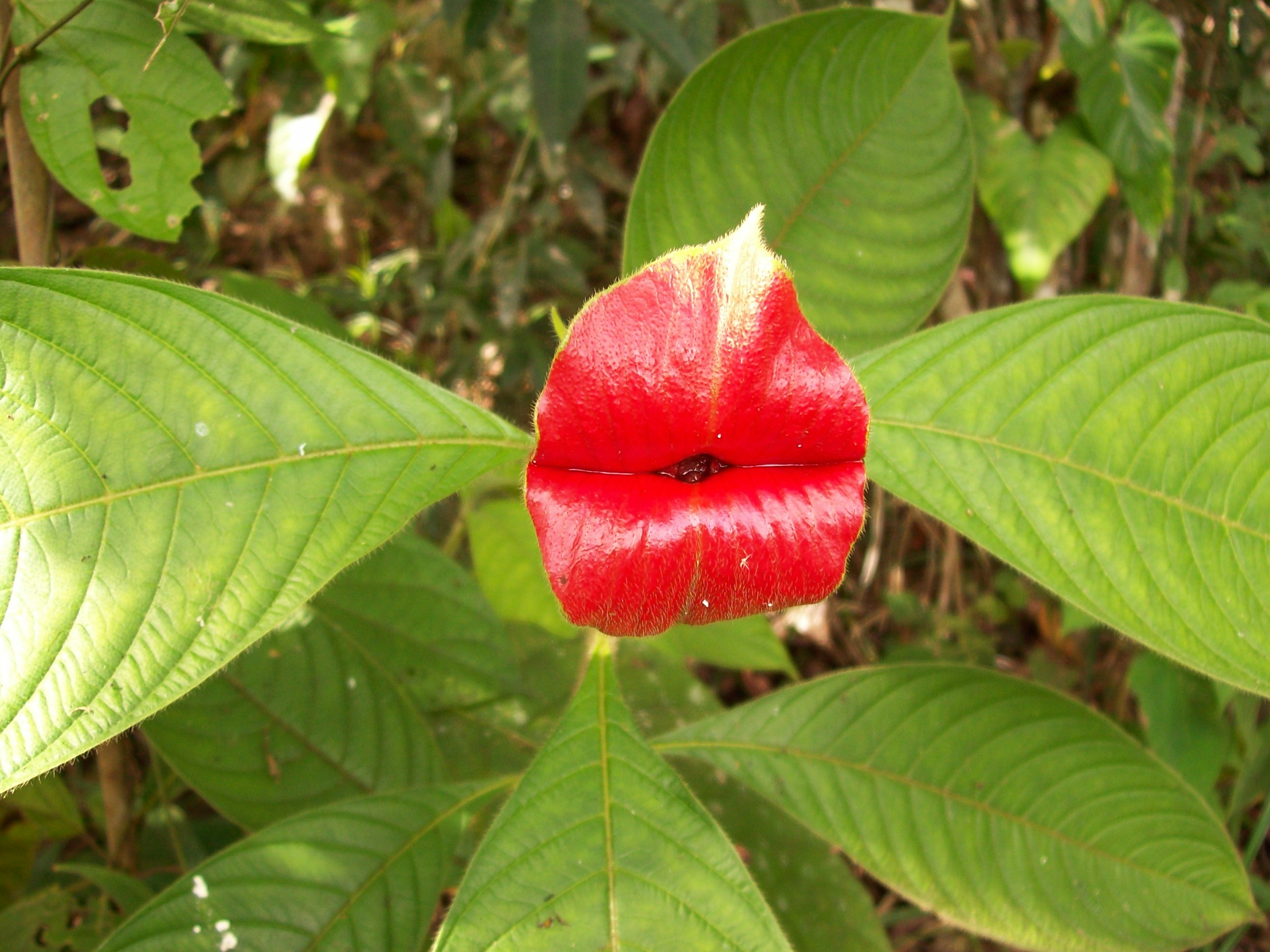
Psychotria elata "red lips"-like bracts before flowering

Palicourea elata, formerly Psychotria elata, commonly known as girlfriend kiss and labios de puta, is a tropical plant that ranges from Central to South American rainforests in countries such as Mexico, Costa Rica, Ecuador, Panama, and Colombia.

The plant is most notable for its distinctly shaped red bracts and is consequently nicknamed “Hot Lips”. Though the bright red bracts are considered its most flashy feature, they are not the actual flowers of the plant but instead extravagant leaves. The hot lips plant comes in a variety of shapes and forms. P. elata is well-studied and has been documented over centuries to provide various health benefits to native communities. Due to these benefits and the overall appearance of the plant, it has been over-harvested and is now endangered.

== Description ==
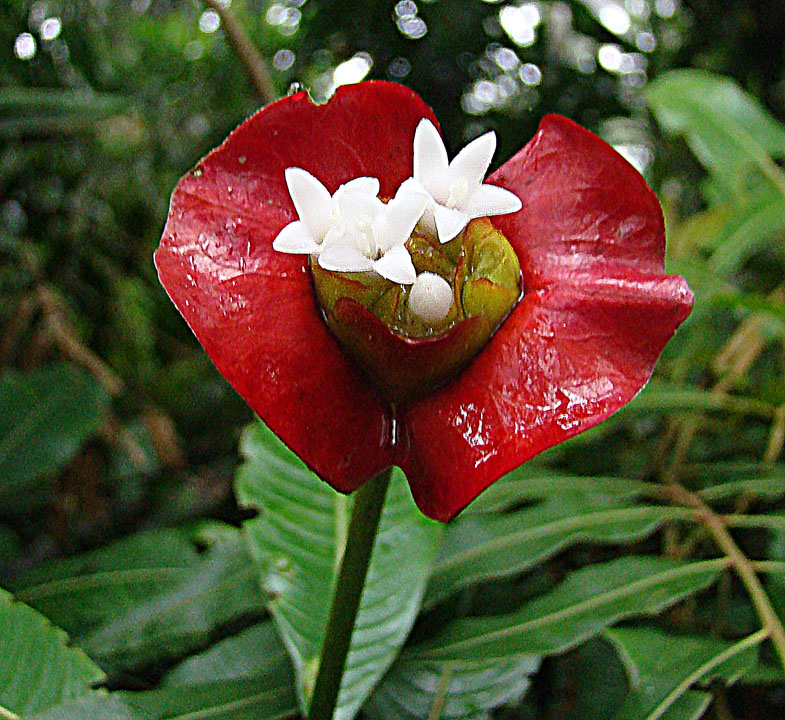
P. elata flower in bloom

Palicourea elata can be described as a shrub that is part of the Rubiaceae family, also commonly known as the coffee, madder, or bedstraw family. The Rubiaceae family is recognizable for having simple, opposite leaves with interpetiolar stipules and can come in the form of terrestrial trees, herbs, lianas, or shrubs like P. elata. This plant will typically be found in the understory layer of rain forests. This species can grow from 1 to 3 m (3.3 to 9.8 ft), occasionally reaching 4 m (13 ft) in height. The plant’s morphology can be quite variable as it is directly affected by the neighborhood structure of nearby plants, and overall light availability that the plant has access to. These variables, as well as the general resources available to the plant, have been shown to effect the biomechanics, allometry, and branching of P. elata, which, in turn, can effect height and leaf count.

The most distinctive features of P. elata are its red bracts, a modified set of leaves. Before its flowers bloom, the bracts resemble a pair of human lips. The flowers of P. elata bloom from December to March and can be described as small, star-shaped flowers. P. elata is part of the genus Palicourea, and, as many plants of this genus, does not give off a scent. Due to the undetectable scent, the plant relies on its shape alone to attract pollinators, such as butterflies and hummingbirds. Once pollination and fertilization occurs, P. elata produces small black or dark blue berries. These berries are then distributed via birds; a common mechanism that plants of the Palicoura genus use.

== Properties ==
Chemical structure of strictosidine

One of the main phytochemicals in Palicourea elata that have been found is strictosidine.

== Conservation status ==
Palicourea elata has become endangered due to deforestation in its native range. Expansive farming and legal and illegal harvesting of trees are causing primary growth and secondary growth forests to be turned into fields for crops, or pastures for livestock, and wastelands. Due to its kissable appearance, it has been widely used as a gift for Valentine’s Day and harvests can be overbearing. Since this species is a understory shrub that relies on the shade that the overhanging trees provide, the population sizes are rapidly decreasing and harshly diminished by over-harvesting, climate changes, and loss of habitat. The International Union for Conservation of Nature (IUCN) has reported that one-tenth of all the Palicourea species are considered threatened. Even so, the endangered species status is not complete as it has been mostly accounted for species only in Ecuador, with many other Palicourea species existing outside the country. If likewise threatened in the rest of its native range, P. elata and potentially a large portion its genus, are at risk.

== Use ==
The bark and leaves of P. elata are used in folk medicine for earaches, cough, and skin irritation or rashes. The Guna people native to Panama and Colombia have habitually used this flower for dyspnea. In Nicaraguan communities, the plant has been used to help with the side effects from snake bites; all parts of the plant have been known to be used for this purpose. For medicinal uses, the desired parts of the plant are made into either a decoction for oral administration or as a poultice for topical administration. As mentioned previously, the plant can offer a psychedelic effect that can potentially be used medically, but is mostly used in ceremonies in native communities. The plant has also been shown to have antimicrobial properties as well as anti-inflammatory properties.

Typically, the plant will be harvested in a secondary growth forest. There has been little research done and even less medical research done on Palicourea elata. Most of the data found on the plant is anecdotal evidence from native populations that has been tested to see if applicable in some way, such as with the antimicrobial and anti-inflammatory properties the plant contains.
