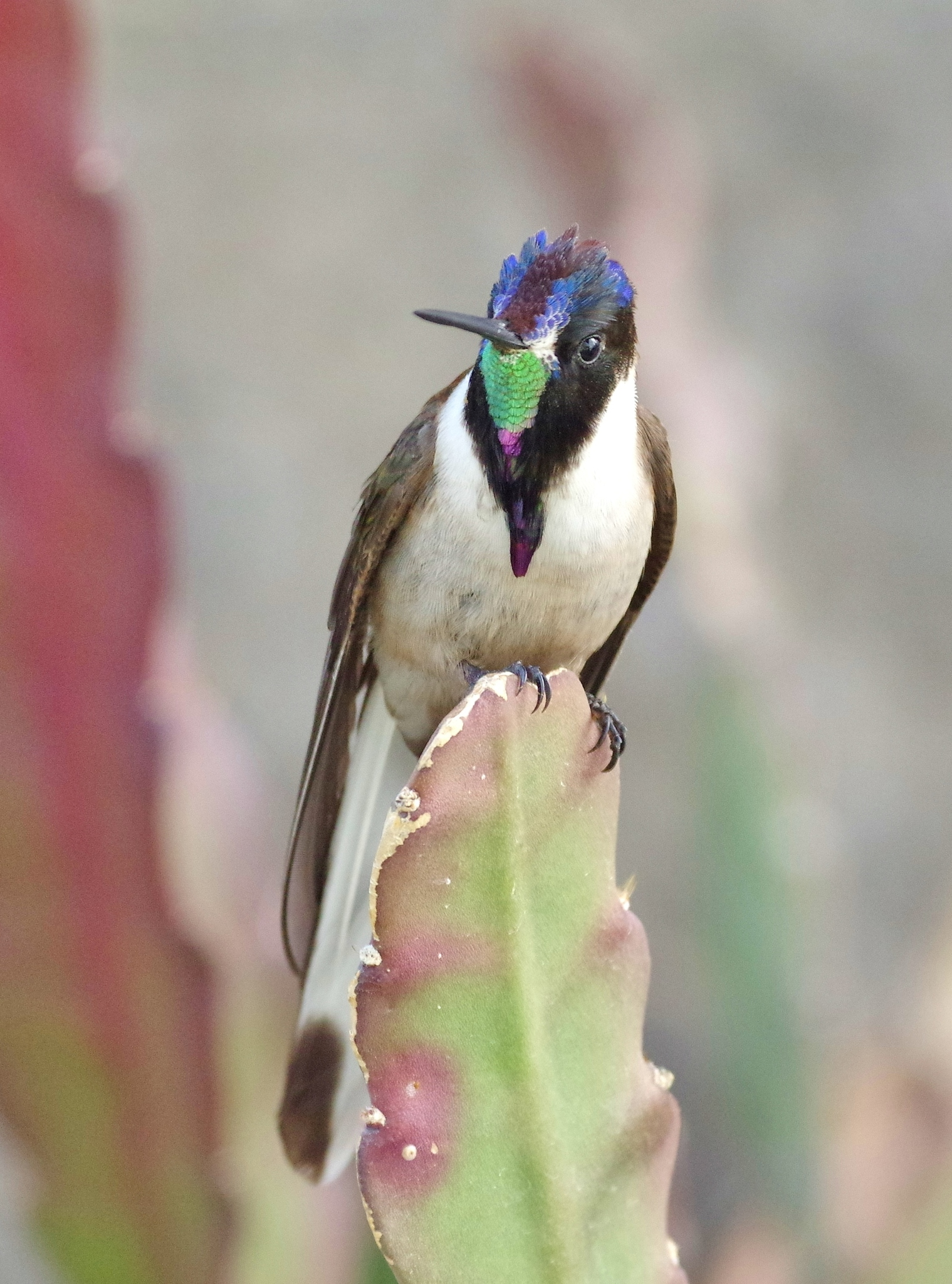
- A bearded mountaineer in Ollantaytambo, Peru on December 5, 2015.

Conservation status
- Least Concern (IUCN 3.1)
- CITES Appendix II

Scientific classification
- Kingdom: Animalia
- Phylum: Chordata
- Class: Aves
- Order: Apodiformes
- Family: Trochilidae
- Tribe: Lesbiini
- Genus: Oreonympha; Gould, 1869
- Species: O. nobilis

Binomial name
- Oreonympha nobilis Gould, 1869

= Bearded mountaineer =

Species of hummingbird

The bearded mountaineer (Oreonympha nobilis) is a species of hummingbird in the "coquettes", tribe Lesbiini of subfamily Lesbiinae. It is endemic to Peru.

== Taxonomy and systematics ==
The ornithologist John Gould described the species in 1869, from a specimen collected by Henry Whitely at Tinta District in Peru, and placed it in its own genus Oreonympha. He recognised a kinship with Oxypogon and Ramphomicron. A study of mitochondrial DNA of hummingbirds shows it to be most closely related to the bearded helmetcrests (Oxypogon sp.) and the rufous-capped thornbill (Chalcostigma ruficeps). The other member of the genus Chalcostigma lay outside the group, suggesting the genus might need revising in the future. In addition, the South American Classification Committee (SACC) of the American Ornithological Society is considering a proposal to merge both Oreonympha and Chalcostigma into Oxypogon.

The SACC, the International Ornithological Committee (IOC), and the Clements taxonomy recognize two subspecies, the nominate O. n. nobilis and O. n. albolimbata. However, BirdLife International's Handbook of the Birds of the World (HBW) treats these taxa as separate species, the eastern and western mountaineers respectively.

== Description ==
The bearded mountaineer is 14 to 16.5 cm (5.5 to 6.5 in) long including the approximately 2.3 cm (0.91 in) long bill. It weighs about 7 to 9 g (0.25 to 0.32 oz). Adult males of the nominate subspecies have a deep purplish blue forecrown and crown with a narrow black stripe in the middle. The face is bronzy black with a narrow white band at the back. Its gorget is long and narrow, emerald green under the chin and the rest purplish with a bluish tip. The nape, back, and rump are bronzy to bronzy brown. The tail is long and deeply forked; the feathers are bronzy with increasing amounts of white from the innermost to outermost. The center of the breast is white, the sides of the breast and flanks brownish, and the undertail coverts are bronzy brown. The adult female is similar to the male but duller overall and dingier underneath. Its gorget is smaller and mostly white and the tail less deeply forked. Both sexes have black bills and legs. Juveniles are duller than the adults, with a scaly green crown, a dull brown throat, and a yellow mandible.

Males of subspecies O. n. albolimbata has white bands on either side of the crown and its tail is much more coppery. The female has white extending from the same white bands of the crown through the lores to the gorget.

== Distribution and habitat ==
The "eastern" nominate subspecies of bearded mountaineer is found in the departments of Apurímac and Cuzco of south-central Peru, in the drainages of the Urubamba and upper Apurímac rivers. The "western" subspecies O. n. albolimbata is found in Peru's departments of Huancavelica, Ayacucho, and Apurímac, in the drainages of the Mantaro, Pampas, and Chalhuanca rivers.

The species inhabits dry Andean valleys characterized by rocky and scrubby hillsides and open woodland. It occurs in a variety of native plant communities but also is regularly found in tree tobacco (Nicotiana) and Eucalyptus even along roads and in towns. In elevation it ranges from 2,500 to 3,900 m (8,200 to 12,800 ft).

== Behavior ==
=== Movement ===
The bearded mountaineer is resident throughout it range.

=== Feeding ===
The bearded mountaineer feeds on nectar, primarily that of Agave, cacti, Nicotiana, and Eucalyptus. It feeds both by hovering with an almost vertical stance and tail flicking, but also clings to flowers with open wings. It also eats small arthropods. It is submissive to most other hummingbirds.

=== Breeding ===
The bearded mountaineer's breeding phenology has not been documented, though an early author suggest that it might breed in caves above rivers.

=== Vocalization ===
The bearded mountaineer's vocalizations include "a descending, squeaky series followed by a rich chatter: swee swee chew-chew-chew [and] also a dry dzzrt."

== Status ==
The IUCN uses HBW taxonomy and so treats the subspecies separately as species. Both are assessed as being of Least Concern. Both have restricted ranges; their population numbers are unknown but believed to be stable. The species as a whole is described as uncommon to locally common. Human plantings of Eucalyptus and tree tobacco may be beneficial if native vegetation is lost.
