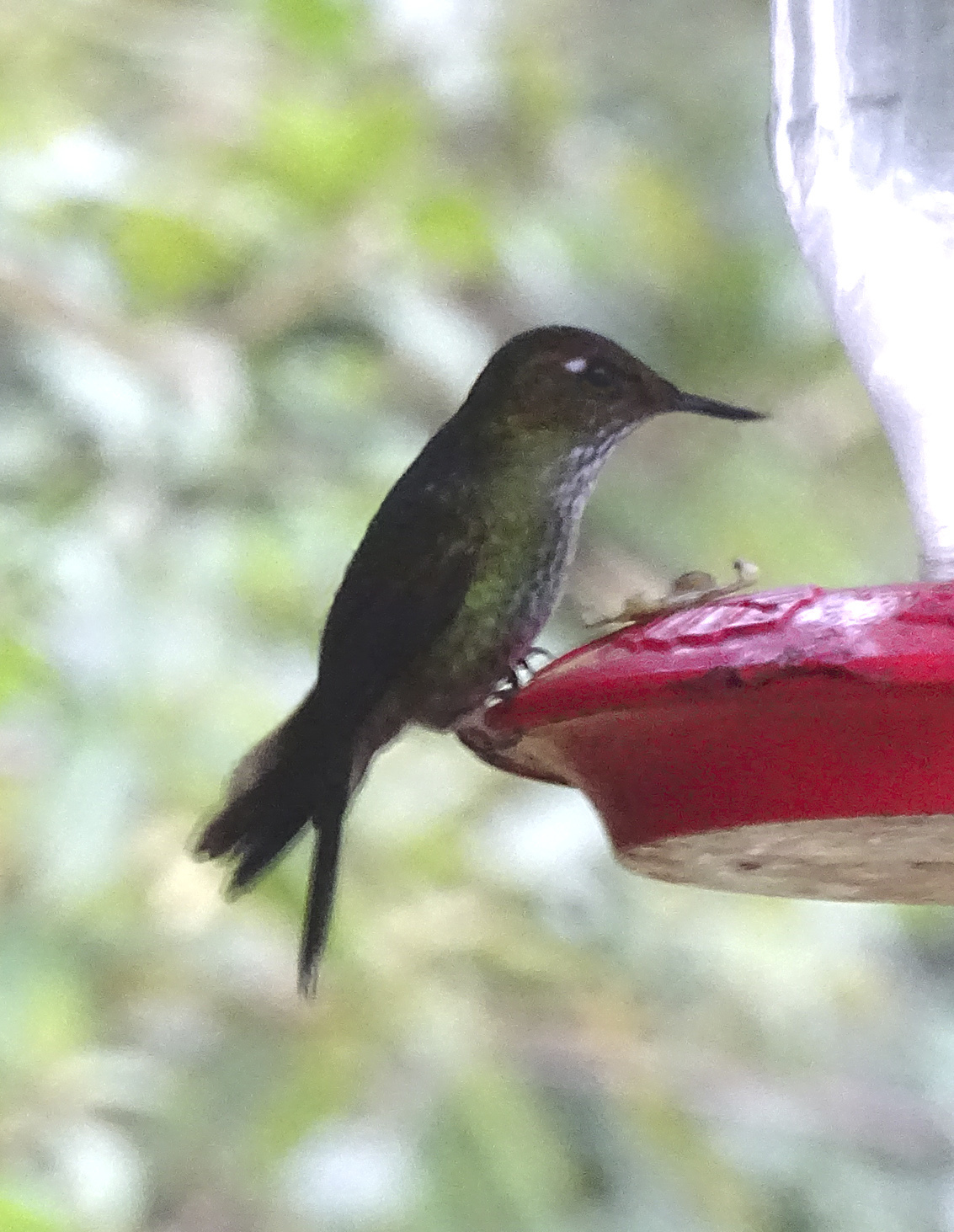

Conservation status
- Least Concern (IUCN 3.1)
- CITES Appendix II (CITES)

Scientific classification
- Kingdom: Animalia
- Phylum: Chordata
- Class: Aves
- Clade: Strisores
- Order: Apodiformes
- Family: Trochilidae
- Tribe: Lesbiini
- Genus: Opisthoprora; Cabanis & Heine, 1860
- Species: O. euryptera

Binomial name
- Opisthoprora euryptera (Loddiges, 1832)

= Mountain avocetbill =

Species of hummiingbird

The mountain avocetbill (Opisthoprora euryptera) is a species of hummingbird in the "coquettes", tribe Lesbiini of subfamily Lesbiinae. It is found in Colombia, Ecuador, and Peru.

== Taxonomy and systematics ==
The mountain avocetbill is the only member of its genus and has no subspecies. It is closely related to the hillstars (genus Oreotrochilus) and trainbearers (genus Lesbia). It was originally described in genus Trochilus which at that time included many species that have been reclassified.

== Description ==
The mountain avocetbill is 10 to 11 cm (3.9 to 4.3 in) long; the few known weights are between 5.8 and 6.6 g (0.20 and 0.23 oz). It has a short bill that turns up slightly at the tip. Adults have bronzy green upperparts with a prominent white spot behind the eye. The tail is notched; the central pair of feathers are bronzy green and the outer ones dark blue with thin whitish tips. The throat and breast are white and the flanks and belly rufous; all have dark green streaks.

== Distribution and habitat ==
The mountain avocetbill is patchily distributed in Colombia's Central Andes, on the east slope of the Andes in Ecuador, and at a few locations on the east slope in northern Peru. It inhabits the interior, edges, and clearings of elfin forest and humid montane forest and is often seen in roadside shrubbery. In elevation it ranges between 2,600 and 3,600 m (8,500 and 11,800 ft) in Colombia, mostly between 2,400 and 3,200 m (7,900 and 10,500 ft) but as low as 1,700 m (5,600 ft) in Ecuador, and between 2,700 and 3,200 m (8,900 and 10,500 ft) in Peru.

== Behavior ==
=== Movement ===
The mountain avocetbill is sedentary throughout its range.

=== Feeding ===
The mountain avocetbill forages up to 3 m (10 ft) above the ground. It feeds on nectar both while hovering and by clinging to flowers; it sometimes "robs" nectar by piercing the base of a flower. Its diet is not known in detail, but it has been recorded feeding at flowers of the families Ericaceae, Onagraceae, Rubiaceae, Lobeliaceae, and Campanulaceae. It also feeds on small insects caught by sallies from a perch.

=== Breeding ===
The mountain avocetbill's breeding phenology has not been described. It is believed to be polygynous like most other hummingbirds.

=== Vocalization ===
The mountain avocetbil's vocalizations are not well known but do include "a series of descending thin whistles, reminiscent of a piculet: wsee wsee wsee wsee."

== Status ==
The IUCN has assessed the mountain avocetbill as being of Least Concern. Though it has a small range, and its population size is not known, the latter is believed to be stable. It is perceived as rare and local to uncommon in different parts of its range. "Human activity has little short-term direct effect on Mountain Avocetbill".
