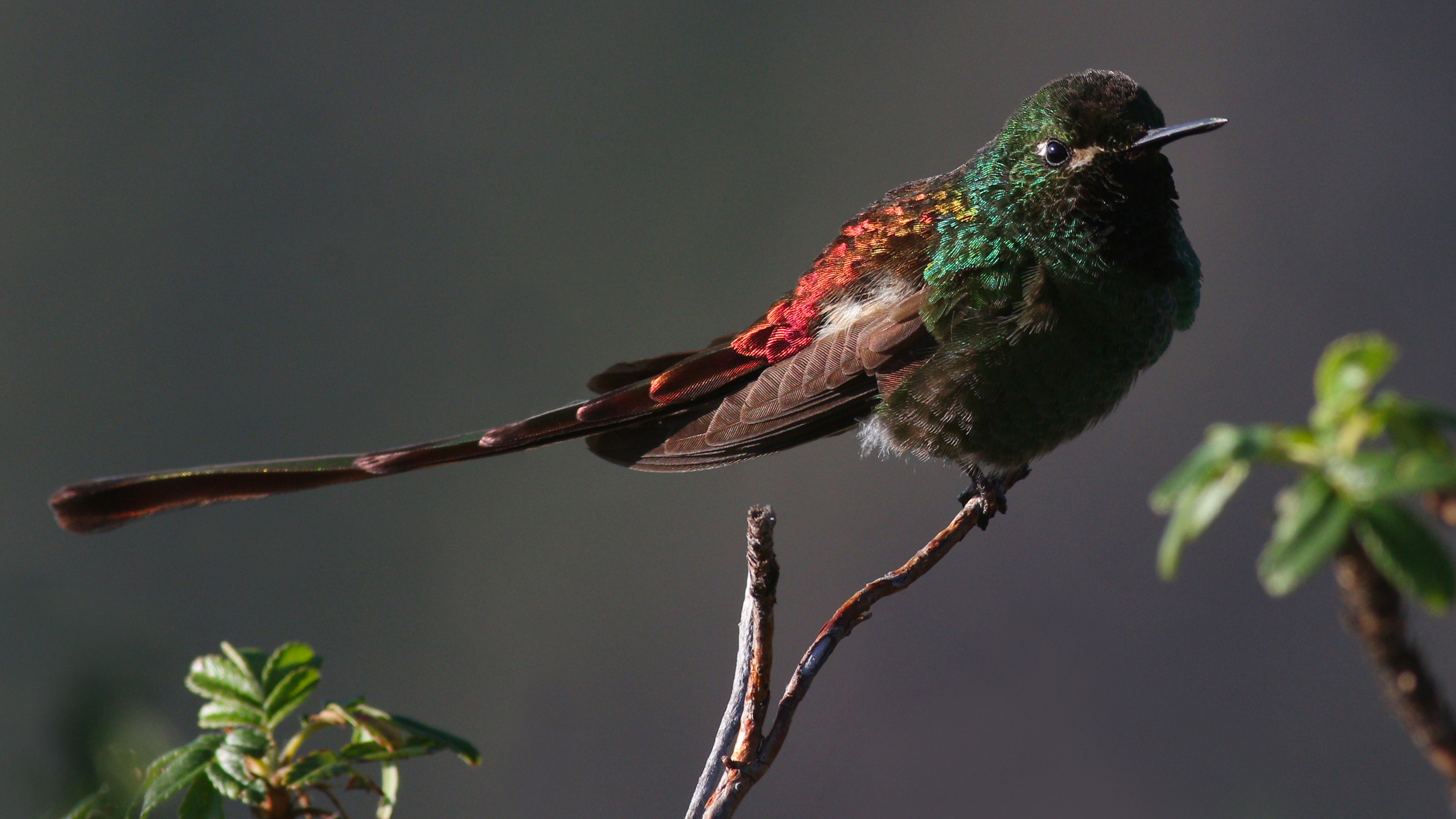

Conservation status
- Least Concern (IUCN 3.1)
- CITES Appendix II

Scientific classification
- Kingdom: Animalia
- Phylum: Chordata
- Class: Aves
- Order: Apodiformes
- Family: Trochilidae
- Tribe: Lesbiini
- Genus: Sappho; Reichenbach, 1849
- Species: S. sparganurus

Binomial name
- Sappho sparganurus (Shaw, 1812)
- Distribution map

Synonyms
- Trochilus sparganurus (protonym); Sappho sparganura

= Red-tailed comet =

Species of hummingbird

The red-tailed comet (Sappho sparganurus) is a medium-sized hummingbird belonging to tribe Lesbiini of subfamily Lesbiinae, the "coquettes". It is found in Argentina and Bolivia and possibly Chile and Peru.

== Taxonomy and systematics ==
The red-tailed comet was formally described in 1812 by the English naturalist George Shaw under the binomial name Trochilus sparganurus. The type locality is Bolivia. Some early twentieth century authors placed it in genus Lesbia. The red-tailed comet is now the only species in genus Sappho that was introduced in 1849 by the German naturalist Ludwig Reichenbach. The genus name refers to Sappho, an ancient Greek poet of Lesbos. The specific epithet sparganurus combines the Ancient Greek σπαργανόω/spargaō meaning 'to wrap' and ουρά/oura meaning 'tail'.

The red-tailed comet has two subspecies, the nominate S. s. sparganurus (Shaw, 1812) and S. s. sapho (Lesson, R, 1828). In the early twentieth century at least one author treated the two as individual species.

In at least part of its range it is known in the local Quechua language as Q'ori Kenti (lit. 'golden hummingbird'). It is called the picaflor cometa in Argentina.

== Description ==
Male red-tailed comets are 19 to 20 cm (7.5 to 7.9 in) long including their 7 to 10 cm (2.8 to 3.9 in) tail. Females are 12 to 14 cm (4.7 to 5.5 in) long. The species weighs about 4 to 6.5 g (0.14 to 0.23 oz). Adult males of the nominate subspecies have a shining green head with a golden green or emerald green gorget. Their back and rump are reddish purple and their underparts mostly green with buffy undertail coverts. Their tail is long and deeply forked. Its upper surface looks reddish purple to green depending on the angle of the light striking it. The tail feathers have a wide velvety black to dusky purple tip. Adult females are overall duller than males and have a shorter tail. Their head and back are shining green and their rump reddish purple. Their throat and underparts are pale buff with small green speckles on the throat, breast, and upper belly. Their outer tail feathers have white or buffy white outer webs. Juveniles are similar to adult females but have dull bronzy green upperparts with a slightly coppery rump and more white on their outer tail feathers. Subspecies S. s. sapho is paler than the nominate and is golden orange where the nominate is reddish purple. Both sexes of both subspecies have a reddish brown iris, a black bill, and black legs and feet.

== Distribution and habitat ==
Sources do not agree on the red-tailed comet's range. According to the South American Classification Committee of the American Ornithological Society it is found only in Argentina and Brazil. Other taxonomic systems and authors add to its range Chile, possibly Peru but not Chile, both Chile and Peru, or Peru and possibly Chile. The sources also differ in the distributions of the two subspecies. The nominate subspecies is variously placed in northern Bolivia and possibly extreme southern Peru, in northern and central Bolivia, and in northern and central Bolivia and accidentally in southern Peru. Subspecies S. s. sapho is variously placed in central Bolivia and northern and western Argentina, in southern Bolivia, northern and western Argentina, and east-central Chile, and from southern Bolivia to western Argentina and northern Chile.

The red-tailed comet inhabits arid montane scrublands on the eastern slope of the Andes and in valleys within the Andes. The landscape is characterized by scattered trees, a bushy understorey, and dense tangles in ravines. It also occurs in Polylepis woodlands. In elevation it ranges mostly between 1,500 and 4,200 m (4,900 and 13,800 ft) but has been reported as low as 400 m (1,300 ft).

== Behavior ==
=== Movement ===
The red-tailed comet is mostly a year-round resident but is known to make elevational movements in Bolivia.

=== Feeding ===
The red-tailed comet feeds primarily on nectar and also includes small arthropods in its diet. It collects nectar both while hovering and while perched; it captures arthropods in flight and sometimes by gleaning them from vegetation. Males defend flower patches as feeding territory.

=== Breeding ===
The red-tailed comet's breeding season has not been fully defined. It is reported to span October to December in Argentina and seems to include April to June in Bolivia. As is true of all hummingbirds, the female makes the nest, incubates the eggs, and cares for nestlings. The nest is a bulky cup of moss, lichen, and animal hair. It is usually placed in a niche on a rock wall but sometimes in a tree. The clutch size is two eggs. The incubation period is 19 to 20 days and fledging occurs 31 to 32 days after hatch. One researcher documented a case in which a female began a second brood in a separate nest before its first brood fledged. It successfully raised all four young. The two nests were built near each other under the eave of a house.

=== Vocalization ===
What is thought to be the red-tailed comet's song is "a short, rapid, jumbled chatter". It also makes an "unmelodic tjrrrt" and "rather harsh tsha or zack notes, which may be monotonously repeated at more than 1 s intervals".

== Status ==
The IUCN has assessed the red-tailed comet as being of Least Concern. It has a very large range, and though its population size is not known it is believed to be stable. No immediate threats have been identified. It is considered fairly common throughout its main range.

== Gallery ==
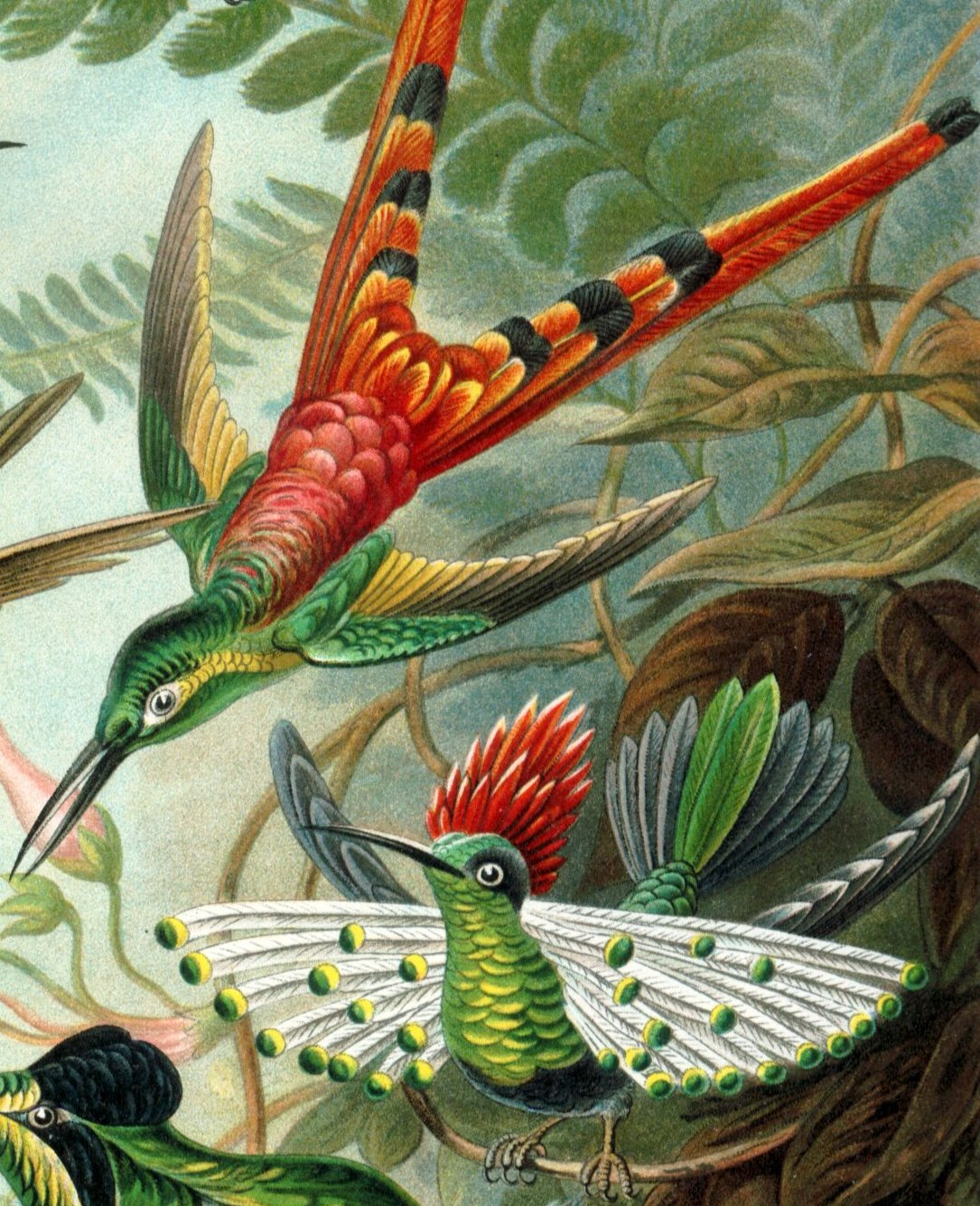
Illustration from Kunstformen der Natur (1904)

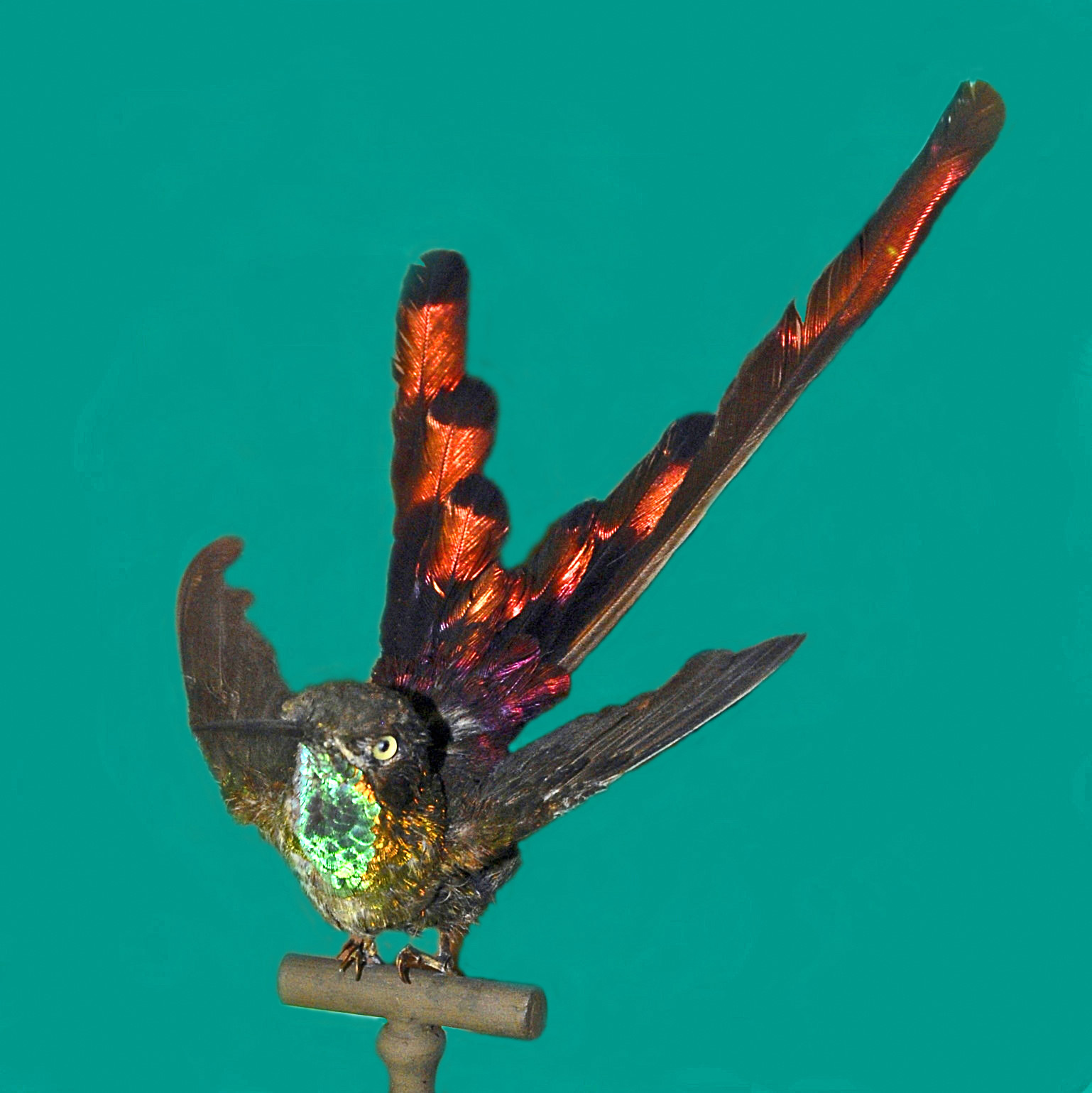
Sappho sparganurus. Museum specimen

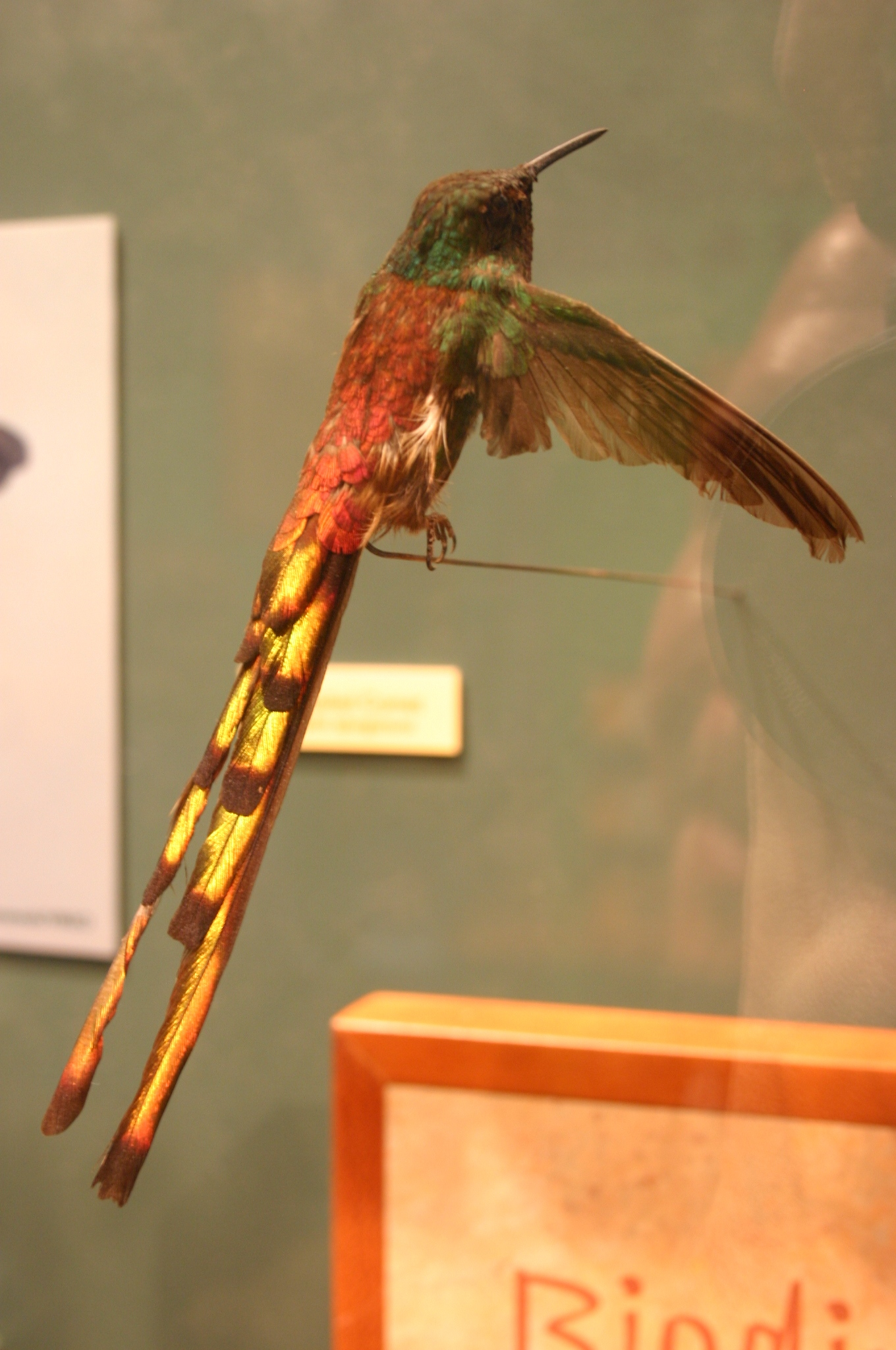
Museum specimen

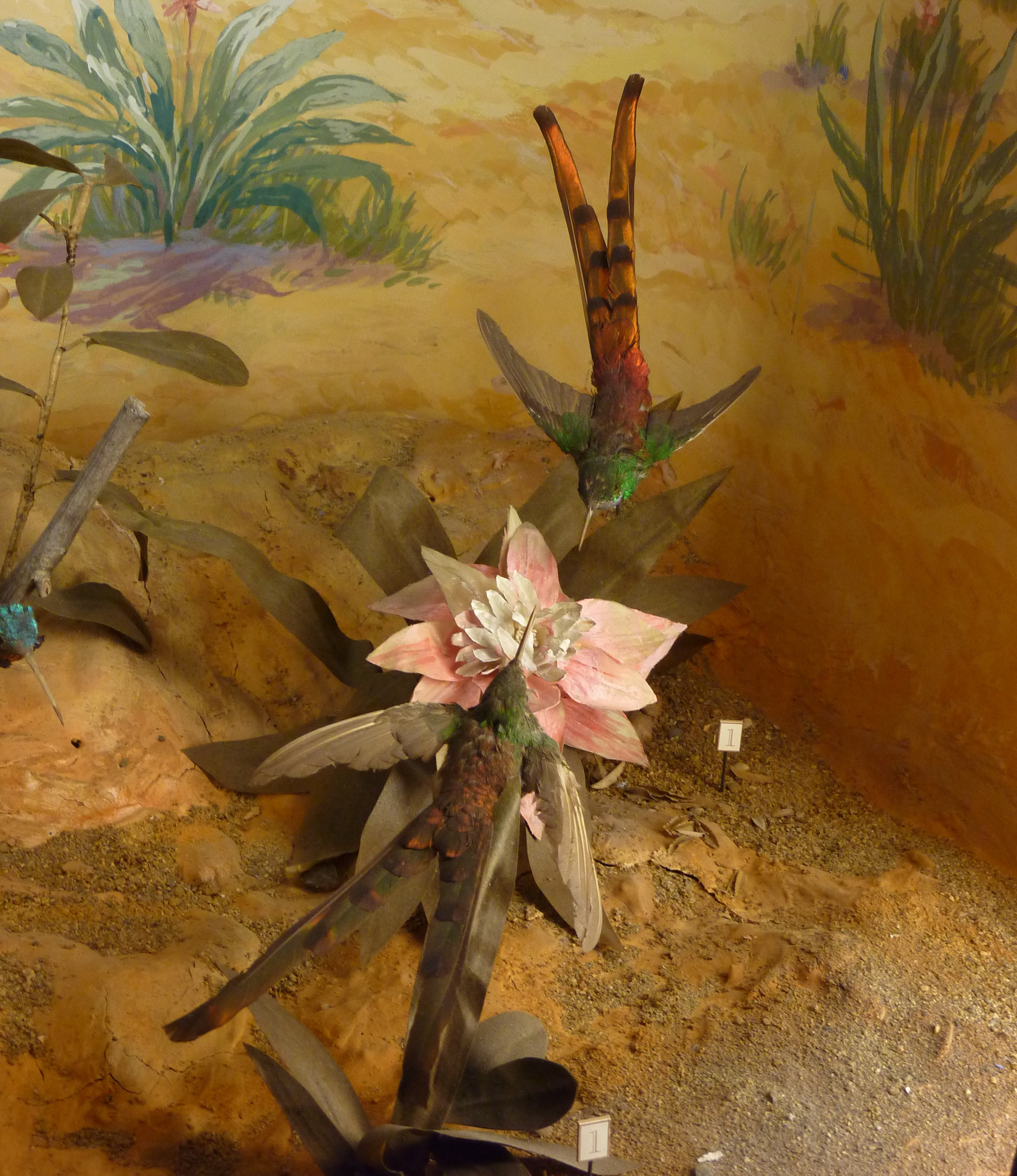
Museum specimen

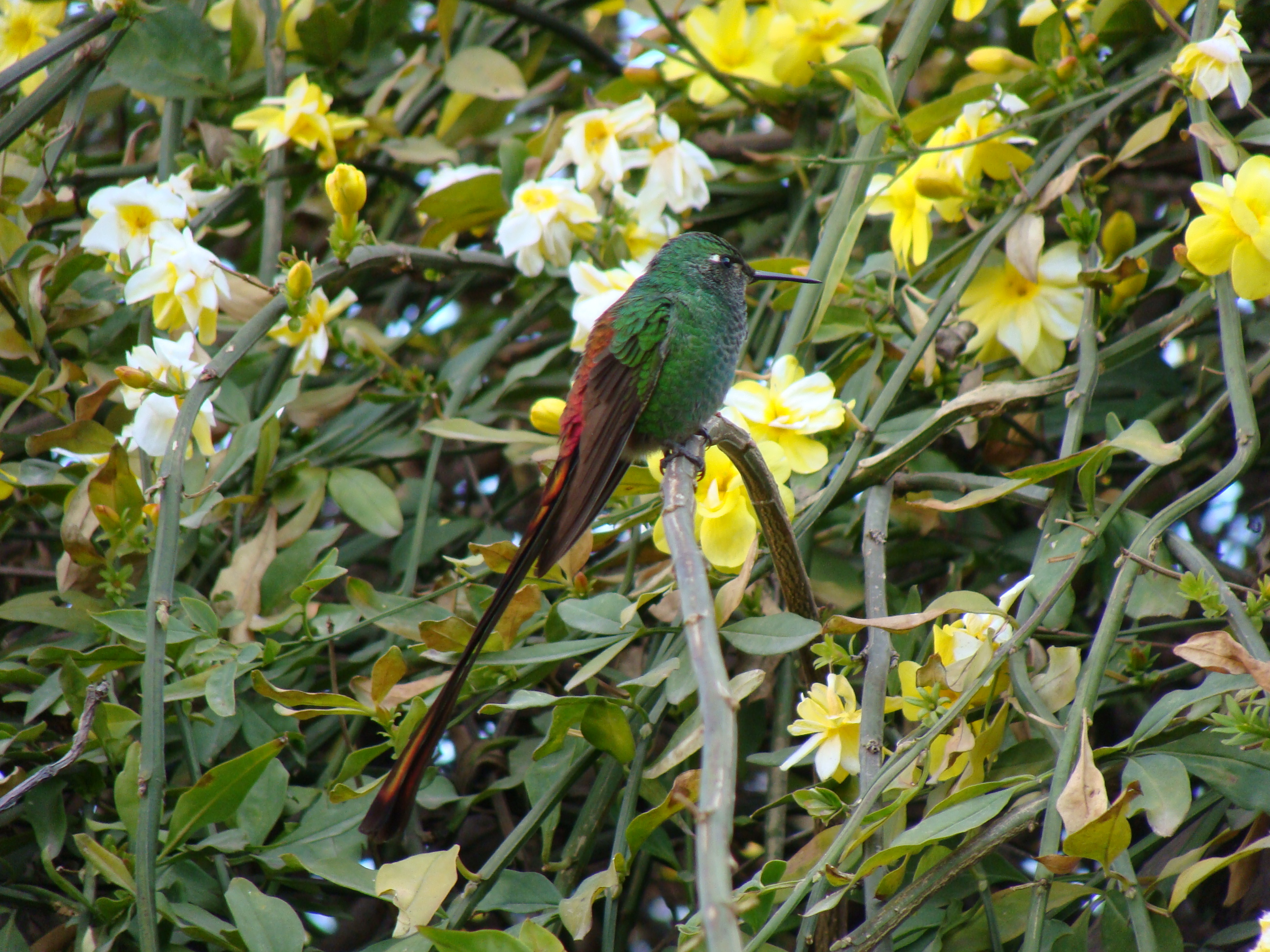
A male red-tailed comet in Cordoba, Argentina.
