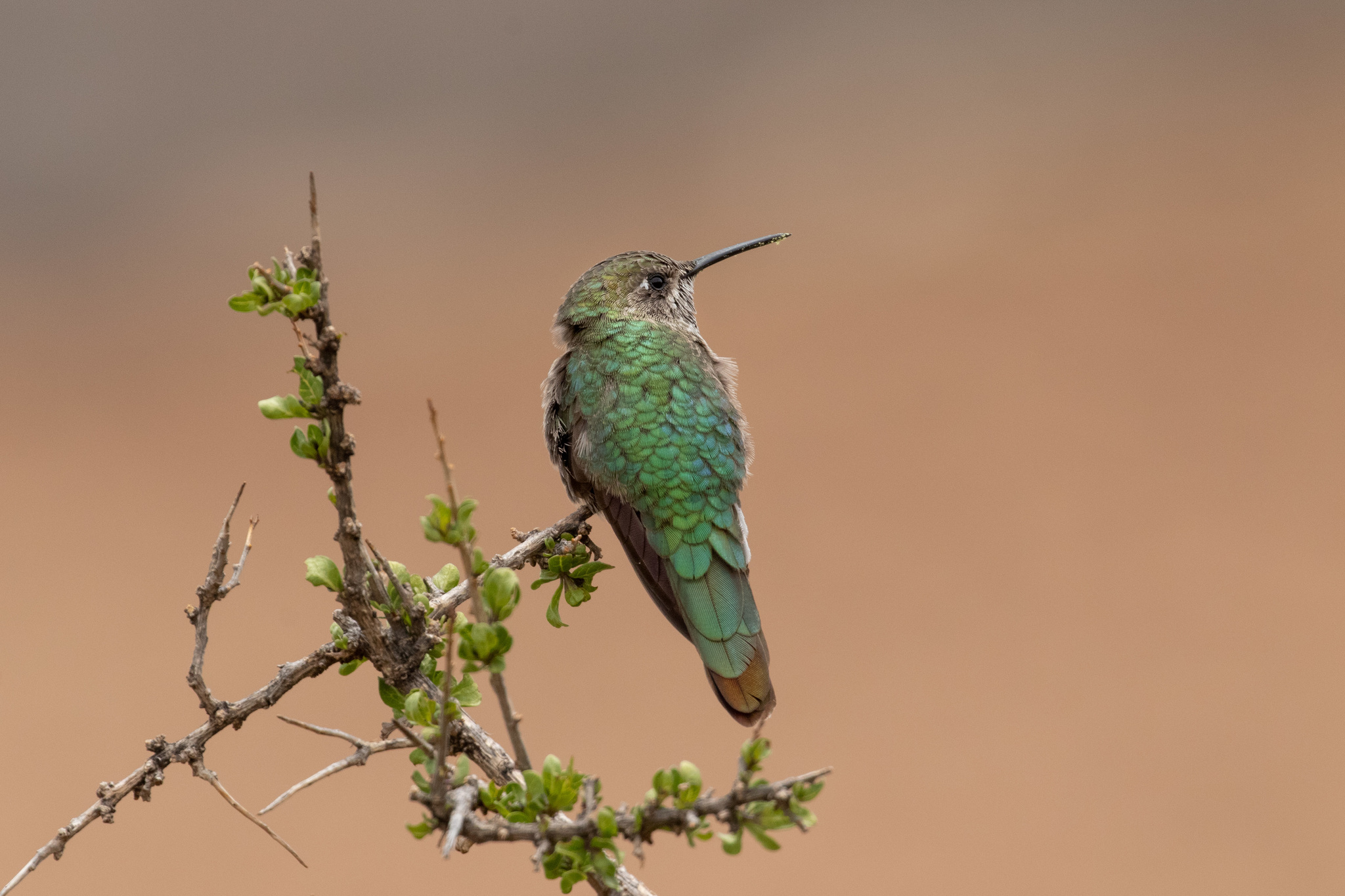

Conservation status
- Least Concern (IUCN 3.1)
- CITES Appendix II (CITES)

Scientific classification
- Kingdom: Animalia
- Phylum: Chordata
- Class: Aves
- Clade: Strisores
- Order: Apodiformes
- Family: Trochilidae
- Tribe: Lesbiini
- Genus: Polyonymus; Heine, 1863
- Species: P. caroli

Binomial name
- Polyonymus caroli (Bourcier, 1847)

= Bronze-tailed comet =

Species of hummingbird

The bronze-tailed comet (Polyonymus caroli) is a species of hummingbird in the "coquettes", tribe Lesbiini of subfamily Lesbiinae. It is endemic to Peru.

== Taxonomy and systematics ==
The bronze-tailed comet is the only member of its genus and has no subspecies. However, at one time the grey-bellied comet (Taphrolesbia griseiventris) was also placed in Polyonymus.

== Description ==
The bronze-tailed comet is 11 to 13 cm (4.3 to 5.1 in) long and weighs about 4.8 g (0.17 oz). Adult males have dark bronzy green upperparts. Their tail is somewhat long and deeply forked and its central feathers are bronzy green. The upper surface of the other tail feathers are steel blue or purplish becoming bronze at the ends; their undersides are entirely steel blue. They have a white spot behind the eye. The gorget is large and rosy violet to rosy purple, and the rest of the underparts are bronze green. Adult females are similar to the males but duller. Their gorget is smaller and more orange and the tail shorter and less deeply forked. The belly is grayish with green speckles.

== Distribution and habitat ==
The bronze-tailed comet is found on the Pacific slope and dry valleys of the Peruvian Andes from the Department of Cajamarca south into the Department of Arequipa. It inhabits arid to semi-arid montane scrublands and small montane woods. In elevation it ranges from 2,100 to 3,400 m (6,900 to 11,000 ft).

== Behavior ==
=== Movement ===
The bronze-tailed comet is sedentary.

=== Feeding ===
The bronze-tailed comet's diet is not known in detail, though it is known to be mostly insectivorous and also eats small arthropods. It forages at all heights but mostly near the ground.

=== Breeding ===
The bronze-tailed comet's breeding season appears to include at least November and December but little else is known about the species' breeding phenology. Its nest has not been described.

=== Vocalization ===
The bronze-tailed comet's apparent song is "a short trill that rises in pitch and then descends". While foraging it makes ""a dry, rapid chatter: tcht or tchtcht.

== Status ==
The IUCN has assessed the bronze-tailed comet as being of Least Concern. Though its population size is not known it is believed to be stable. It is uncommon, but "occupies areas in the Andes that have been settled by humans for thousands of years, and at least in the short term seems to be little affected by human activities."
