= Thornbill =

Thornbill can refer to:

- Acanthiza, a genus of Australian passerine birds.
- Two genera of hummingbirds, Chalcostigma and Ramphomicron
