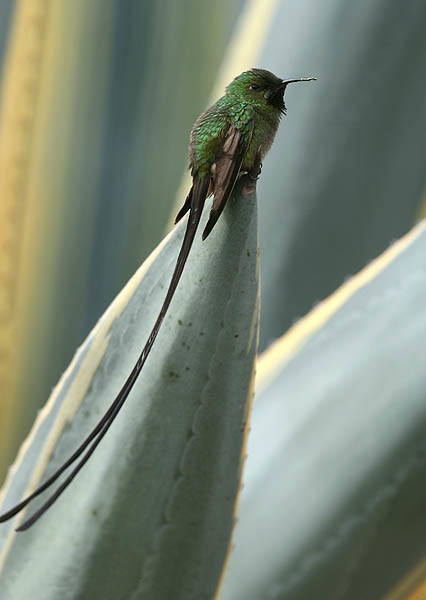
- Black-tailed trainbearer (Lesbia victoriae)

Scientific classification
- Kingdom: Animalia
- Phylum: Chordata
- Class: Aves
- Order: Apodiformes
- Family: Trochilidae
- Subfamily: Lesbiinae
- Tribe: Lesbiini; Reichenbach, 1854

Genera
- 18, see text

= Lesbiini =

Tribe of birds

Lesbiini is one of the two tribes that make up the subfamily Lesbiinae in the hummingbird family Trochilidae. The other tribe is Heliantheini (brilliants).

The informal name "coquettes" has been proposed for this group as the largest genus, Lophornis, has 11 species with "coquette" in their common name.

The tribe contains 67 species divided into 18 genera.

== Phylogeny ==
A molecular phylogenetic study of the hummingbirds published in 2007 found that the family was composed of nine major clades. When Edward Dickinson and James Van Remsen, Jr. updated the Howard and Moore Complete Checklist of the Birds of the World for the 4th edition in 2013 they based their classification on these results and placed two of the nine clades in a new subfamily Lesbiinae. Each clade formed a separate tribe which they named Lesbinii and Heliantheini. The subfamily Lesbiinae had been introduced by the German naturalist Ludwig Reichenbach in 1854.

== Cladograms ==
Molecular phylogenetic studies by Jimmy McGuire and collaborators published between 2007 and 2014 determined the relationships between the major groups of hummingbirds. In the cladogram below the English names are those introduced in 1997. The Latin names are those proposed by Dickinson and Remsen in 2013.

- Trochilidae
  - - Florisuginae – topazes
    - Phaethornithinae – hermits
  - - Polytminae – mangoes
    - - Lesbiinae
        - Heliantheini – brilliants
        - Lesbiini – coquettes
      - - Patagoninae – giant hummingbird
        - Trochilinae
          - - Lampornithini – mountain gems
            - Mellisugini – bees
          - Trochilini – emeralds

The 2014 study also determined the relationships between the genera within the Lesbiini.

- Lesbiini
  - - Sephanoides – firecrowns (2 species)
    - - Lophornis – coquettes (11 species)
      - Discosura – thorntails and coquette (5 species)
  - - Phlogophilus – piedtails (2 species)
    - - Heliangelus – sunangels (9 species)
      - - - Adelomyia – speckled hummingbird
          - - Taphrolesbia – grey-bellied comet
            - Aglaiocercus – sylphs (3 species)
        - - - Sappho – red-tailed comet
            - - Ramphomicron – thornbills (2 species)
              - Lesbia – trainbearers (2 species)
          - - Oreotrochilus – hillstars (7 species)
            - - Polyonymus – bronze-tailed comet
              - - Opisthoprora – mountain avocetbill
                - - - Chalcostigma – thornbills (5 species)
                    - Oreonympha – bearded mountaineer
                    - Oxypogon – helmetcrests (4 species)
                  - Metallura – metaltails (9 species)

== Taxonomic list ==
The tribe contains 18 genera.

| Image | Genus | Living species |
|---|---|---|
| | Heliangelus | Orange-throated sunangel, Heliangelus mavors; Amethyst-throated sunangel, Heliangelus amethysticollis; Longuemare's sunangel, Heliangelus clarisse; Merida sunangel, Heliangelus spencei; Gorgeted sunangel, Heliangelus strophianus; Tourmaline sunangel, Heliangelus exortis; Flame-throated sunangel, Heliangelus micrastur; Purple-throated sunangel, Heliangelus viola; Royal sunangel, Heliangelus regalis |
| | Sephanoides | Green-backed firecrown, Sephanoides sephaniodes; Juan Fernández firecrown, Sephanoides fernandensis |
| | Discosura | Wire-crested thorntail, Discosura popelairii; Black-bellied thorntail, Discosura langsdorffi; Letitia's thorntail, Discosura letitiae; Green thorntail, Discosura conversii; Racket-tailed coquette, Discosura longicauda |
| | Lophornis | Tufted coquette, Lophornis ornatus; Dot-eared coquette, Lophornis gouldii; Frilled coquette, Lophornis magnificus; Short-crested coquette, Lophornis brachylophus; Rufous-crested coquette, Lophornis delattrei; Spangled coquette, Lophornis stictolophus; Festive coquette, Lophornis chalybeus; Butterfly coquette, Lophornis verreauxii; Peacock coquette, Lophornis pavoninus; Black-crested coquette, Lophornis helenae; White-crested coquette, Lophornis adorabilis |
| | Phlogophilus | Ecuadorian piedtail, Phlogophilus hemileucurus; Peruvian piedtail, Phlogophilus harterti |
| | Adelomyia | Speckled hummingbird, Adelomyia melanogenys |
| | Aglaiocercus | Long-tailed sylph, Aglaiocercus kingii; Violet-tailed sylph, Aglaiocercus coelestis; Venezuelan sylph, Aglaiocercus berlepschi |
| | Sappho | Red-tailed comet, Sappho sparganurus |
| | Polyonymus | Bronze-tailed comet, Polyonymus caroli |
| | Taphrolesbia | Grey-bellied comet, Taphrolesbia griseiventris |
| | Oreotrochilus | Andean hillstar, Oreotrochilus estella; White-sided hillstar, Oreotrochilus leucopleurus; Ecuadorian hillstar, Oreotrochilus chimborazo; Blue-throated hillstar, Oreotrochilus cyanolaemus; Green-headed hillstar, Oreotrochilus stolzmanni; Black-breasted hillstar, Oreotrochilus melanogaster; Wedge-tailed hillstar, Oreotrochilus adela |
| | Opisthoprora | Mountain avocetbill, Opisthoprora euryptera |
| | Lesbia | Black-tailed trainbearer, Lesbia victoriae; Green-tailed trainbearer, Lesbia nuna |
| | Ramphomicron | Black-backed thornbill, Ramphomicron dorsale; Purple-backed thornbill, Ramphomicron microrhynchum |
| | Chalcostigma | Rufous-capped thornbill, Chalcostigma ruficeps; Olivaceous thornbill, Chalcostigma olivaceum; Blue-mantled thornbill, Chalcostigma stanleyi; Bronze-tailed thornbill, Chalcostigma heteropogon; Rainbow-bearded thornbill, Chalcostigma herrani |
| | Oxypogon | Buffy helmetcrest, Oxypogon stuebelii; Blue-bearded helmetcrest, Oxypogon cyanolaemus; White-bearded helmetcrest, Oxypogon lindenii; Green-bearded helmetcrest, Oxypogon guerinii |
| | Oreonympha | Bearded mountaineer, Oreonympha nobilis |
| | Metallura | Tyrian metaltail, Metallura tyrianthina; Perija metaltail, Metallura iracunda; Viridian metaltail, Metallura williami; Violet-throated metaltail, Metallura baroni; Neblina metaltail, Metallura odomae; Coppery metaltail, Metallura theresiae; Fiery-throated metaltail, Metallura eupogon; Scaled metaltail, Metallura aeneocauda; Black metaltail, Metallura phoebe |

== Sources ==
- Dickinson, E.C.; Remsen, J.V. Jr., eds. (2013). The Howard & Moore Complete Checklist of the Birds of the World. Vol. 1: Non-passerines (4th ed.). Eastbourne, UK: Aves Press. ISBN 978-0-9568611-0-8.
