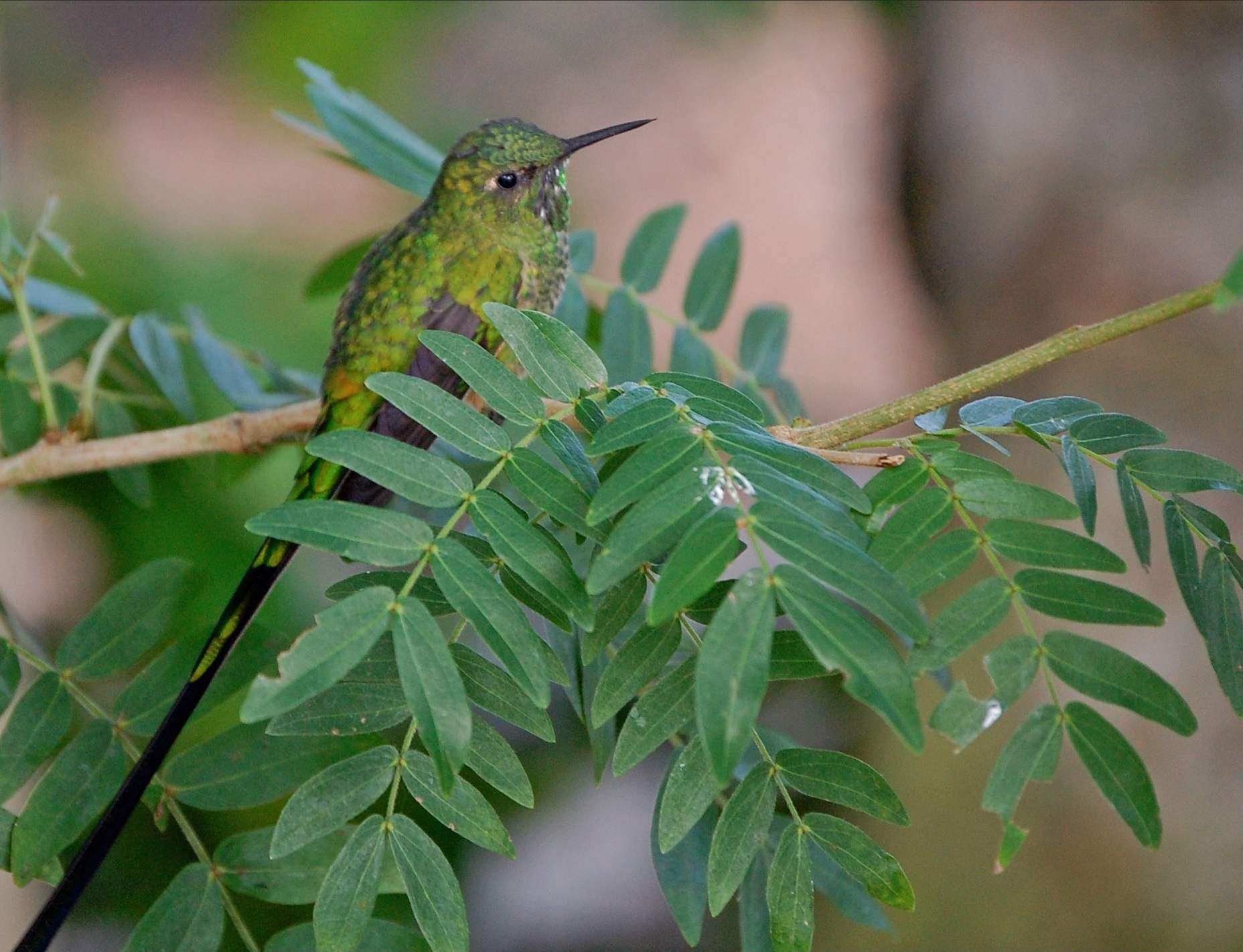

Conservation status
- Least Concern (IUCN 3.1)
- CITES Appendix II

Scientific classification
- Kingdom: Animalia
- Phylum: Chordata
- Class: Aves
- Order: Apodiformes
- Family: Trochilidae
- Genus: Lesbia
- Species: L. nuna

Binomial name
- Lesbia nuna (Lesson, 1832)
- Range of Lesbia nuna

= Green-tailed trainbearer =

Species of hummingbird

The green-tailed trainbearer (Lesbia nuna) is a species of hummingbird in the "coquettes", tribe Lesbiini of subfamily Lesbiinae. It is found in Bolivia, Colombia, Ecuador, Peru, and possibly Venezuela.

== Taxonomy and systematics ==
The taxonomy of the green-tailed trainbearer is not settled. The International Ornithological Committee (IOC) recognizes these six subspecies:

- L. n. gouldii Loddiges (1832)
- L. n. gracilis Gould (1846)
- L. n. aureliae Weller & Schuchmann (2004)
- L. n. pallidiventris Simon (1902)
- L. n. huallagae Weller & Schuchmann (2004)
- L. n. nuna Lesson (1832)

The Clements taxonomy and BirdLife International's Handbook of the Birds of the World (HBW) recognize a seventh, L. n. boliviana (Boucard, 1892) that the IOC treats as a synonym of the nominate subspecies.

Though the green-tailed trainbearer shares its genus with the black-tailed trainbearer (L. victoriae), they might not be especially closely related. All of the subspecies except the nominate (and boliviana) have at various times been suggested as separate species. Two additional subspecies have been proposed as well, but the weight of evidence is that they are hybrids of the two trainbearers.

== Description ==
The male green-tailed trainbearer is 15.3 to 17 cm (6.0 to 6.7 in) long including the 10.6 to 13.6 cm (4.2 to 5.4 in) long tail. Females are about 11.6 cm (4.6 in) long including their 4.5 to 6.2 cm (1.8 to 2.4 in) long tail. The species weighs 3.1 to 4.3 g (0.11 to 0.15 oz). It has a short, straight, black bill. Males of the nominate subspecies are almost entirely glittering emerald green; the throat is iridescent emerald green and the lower belly grayish with green dots. Its tail is long, forked, and black with green tips to the feathers. The nominate female is similar but has white underparts with glittering green spots and a shorter tail. Juveniles are similar to the adult female but the male in addition has green spots on the throat.

Males of subspecies L. n. gouldii are similar to the nominate but smaller, with a shorter bill and more green on the tail. L. n. gracilis is also similar to the nominate but has a shorter and thicker bill and buffy undertail coverts with green spots. L. n. pallidiventris has a longer bill than the two subspecies above and has paler and less blue-green upperparts than the nominate. L. n. huallagae has a longer bill than pallidiventris that is still shorter than the nominate's; its plumage is somewhat bronzy green and the belly is paler than the nominate's. L. n. aureliae's plumage is rich golden bronze and it has a creamy buff belly.

== Distribution and habitat ==
The six subspecies recognized by the IOC are found thus:

- L. n. gouldii, the Eastern Andes of northeastern Colombia and the Central Andes of southern Colombia
- L. n. gracilis, the Andes of northern and central Ecuador
- L. n. aureliae, the Andes of southeastern Ecuador from Azuay Province to Loja Province
- L. n. pallidiventris, the Andes of northern and central Peru from eastern Department of Piura to western Department of Huánuco
- L. n. huallagae, the valley of the Huallaga River in central Huánuco, Peru
- L. n. nuna, the Andes of southwestern Peru and northern Bolivia

L. n. boliviana, when treated separately from nuna, is found in Bolivia from La Paz Department to Cochabamba Department.

An old record of L. n. gouldii from Venezuela has been questioned on several grounds and the South American Classification Committee (SACC) of the American Ornithological Society does not include that country in the species' range. The IOC includes Venezuela with a question mark and the Clements taxonomy notes the one old record.

The green-tailed trainbearer mostly inhabits secondary woodland and brushy slopes but also occurs in Polylepis woodland and páramo. In elevation it ranges from 1,700 to 3,800 m (5,600 to 12,500 ft).

== Behavior ==
=== Movement ===
The green-tailed trainbearer's movements have not been defined, but elevational changes after the breeding and flowering season are likely.

== Feeding ==
The green-tailed trainbearer forages for nectar at low to medium heights. It has been recorded taking nectar from the flowers of Castilleja fissifolia, Cavendishia cordifolia, Rubus, Cuphea dipetala, and Palicourea angustifolia. It also feeds on insects caught on the wing and gleaned from flowers.

== Breeding ==
The green-tailed trainbearer's breeding season spans from November to April. It builds a cup nest of moss and rootlets lined with soft plant material and typically places it beneath an overhang on a slope about 2 to 4 m (7 to 10 ft) above the slope's base. The clutch size is two eggs; the incubation and fledging times have not been recorded.

=== Vocalization and non-vocal sound ===
The green-tailed trainbearer's apparent song is " a repeated gravelly note 'drrrt...drrrt...' and similar variations." Its calls include a repeated "buzzy 'bzzzzt'" and an "accelerating series of high-pitched notes 'tseee...tseee...tseee..tsee-tsi-tsi'." It makes a snapping sound with its tail or wings when displaying.

== Status ==
The IUCN has assessed the green-tailed trainbearer as being of Least Concern. It has a large range and its population, though of unknown size, is believed to be stable. It is locally fairly common and no immediate threats are known. However, deforestation of Polylepis woodlands, ranching, and farming are all potential threats.
