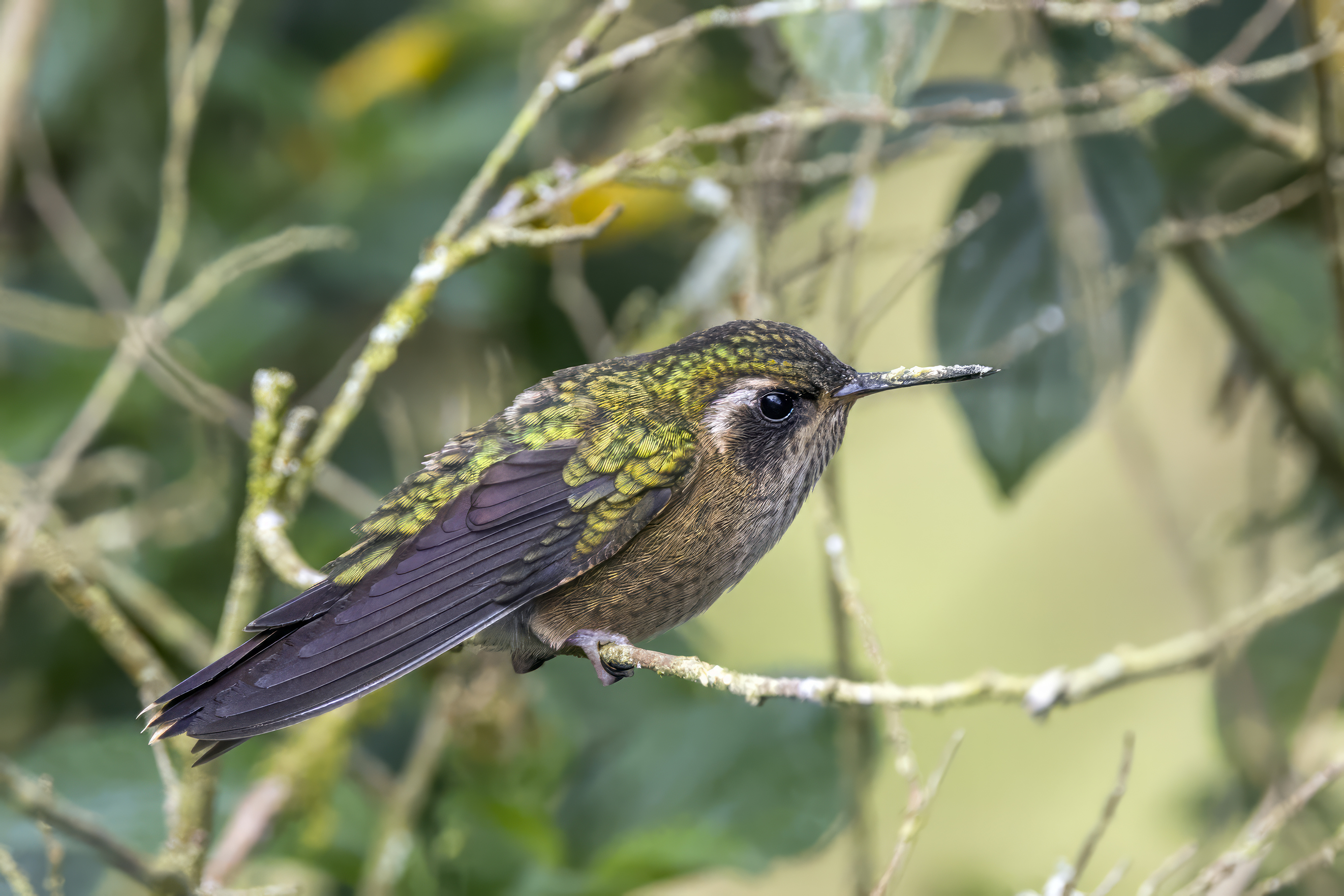
- Adelomyia melanogenys melanogenys, Colombia

Conservation status
- Least Concern (IUCN 3.1)
- CITES Appendix II

Scientific classification
- Kingdom: Animalia
- Phylum: Chordata
- Class: Aves
- Clade: Strisores
- Order: Apodiformes
- Family: Trochilidae
- Subfamily: Lesbiinae
- Tribe: Lesbiini
- Genus: Adelomyia; Bonaparte, 1854
- Species: A. melanogenys

Binomial name
- Adelomyia melanogenys (Fraser, 1840)
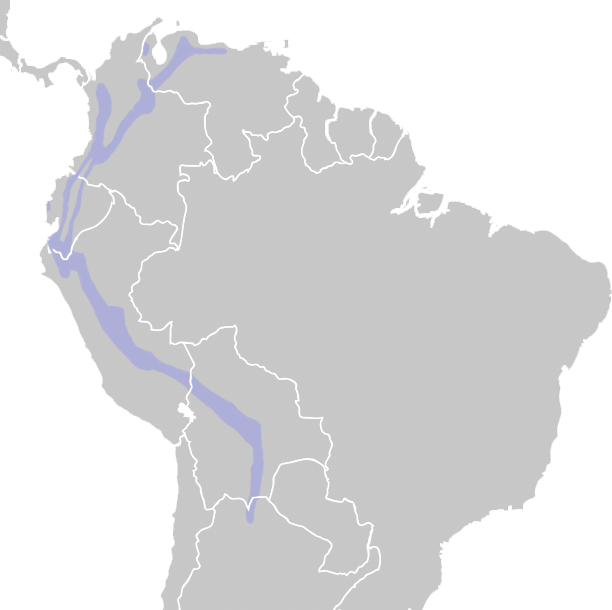

Synonyms
- Adelomya Mulsant & Verreaux, 1866

= Speckled hummingbird =

Species of bird

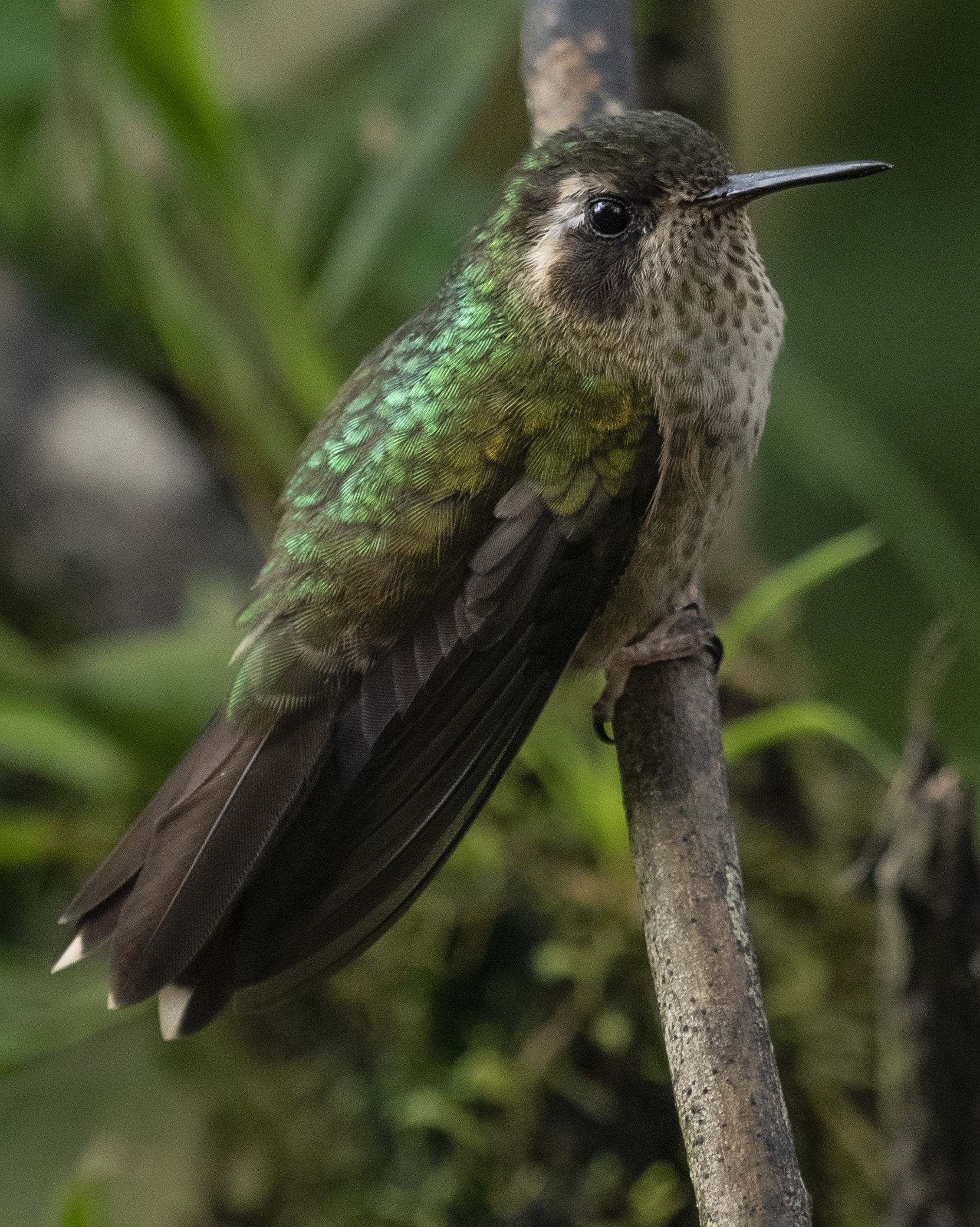
Speckled hummingbird in Bellavista Cloud Forest Reserve, Ecuador

The speckled hummingbird (Adelomyia melanogenys) is a species of hummingbird. It is the only member of the genus Adelomyia. It inhabits Neotropical montane cloud forests at elevations of 1,000–2,500 meters and is confined to the Andes of Argentina, Bolivia, Peru, Ecuador, Colombia and Venezuela; as well as to some isolated montane forests in western Ecuador and Venezuela. In Ecuador, it ranges across both the eastern and western slopes of the Andes and occupies a broad altitudinal range from subtropical forests (1400 m) to cloud forests (3000 m). In addition, one isolated population inhabits the Chongón Colonche cordillera in the coastal evergreen montane forest (600 m) located ca. 130 km away from the Andes.

== Description ==
The speckled hummingbird is a monomorphic species, making females and males indistinguishable. Adults measure approximately 8 cm, or 3 inches, in length (from bill to tip of tail). The upper plumage is a glossy green/bronze. The underside is pale, with green and bronze specks. It has a black cheek patch below its eye with a white stripe above.

== Systematics ==
While the speckled hummingbird is the only species in its genus, evidence suggests that populations on either side of the Andes mountains are genetically distinct, especially due to its broad geographic and ecological distribution. Relationships with other hummingbirds are uncertain and is still in need of further studies.

Based on plumage coloration and biogeography, eight subspecies have been described, and known as Adelomyia melanogenys melanogenys, inornata, connectens, maculata, aenosticta, chlorospila, debellardiana and cervina. A recent study of this genus, based on molecular, morphological and ecological data recovered six monophyletic clades which show distributional limits at well-defined geographic barriers, not corresponding with the currently recognized limits of subspecies. Sequence divergence ranged between 5.8% and 8.2% between phylogroups separated by >4000 km and <50 km distances respectively, this gives support to the idea that geographic isolation may be influential at very different scales. Morphological traits are more related to environmental heterogeneity than to geographic barriers and isolation.

== Behavior ==
The speckled hummingbird is a solitary species. They neither live nor migrate in flocks and there is no pair bond for this species, making them a mainly sedentary species. Nevertheless, individuals may disperse to lower altitudes as the breeding periods finish.

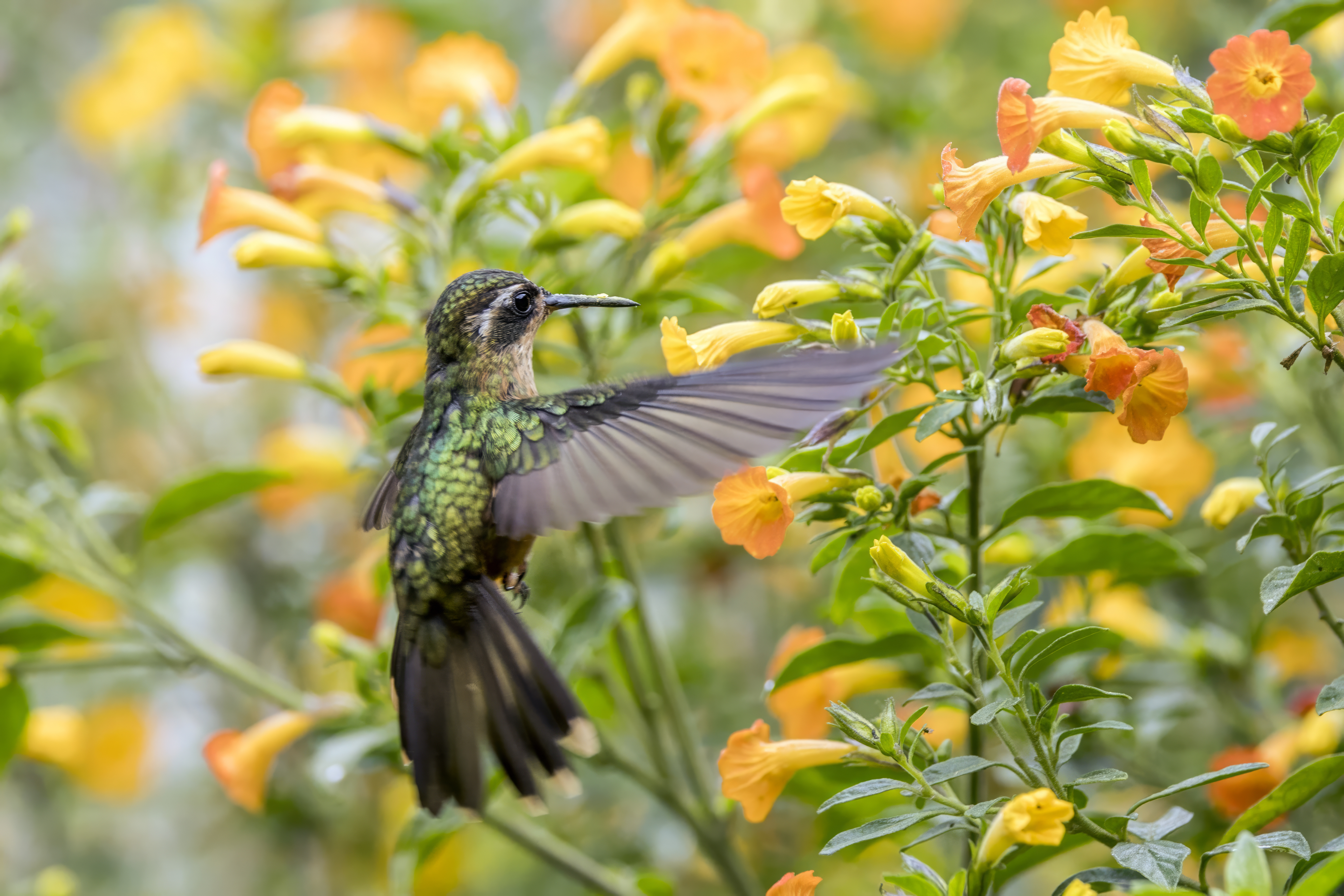
A. m. cervina, Colombia

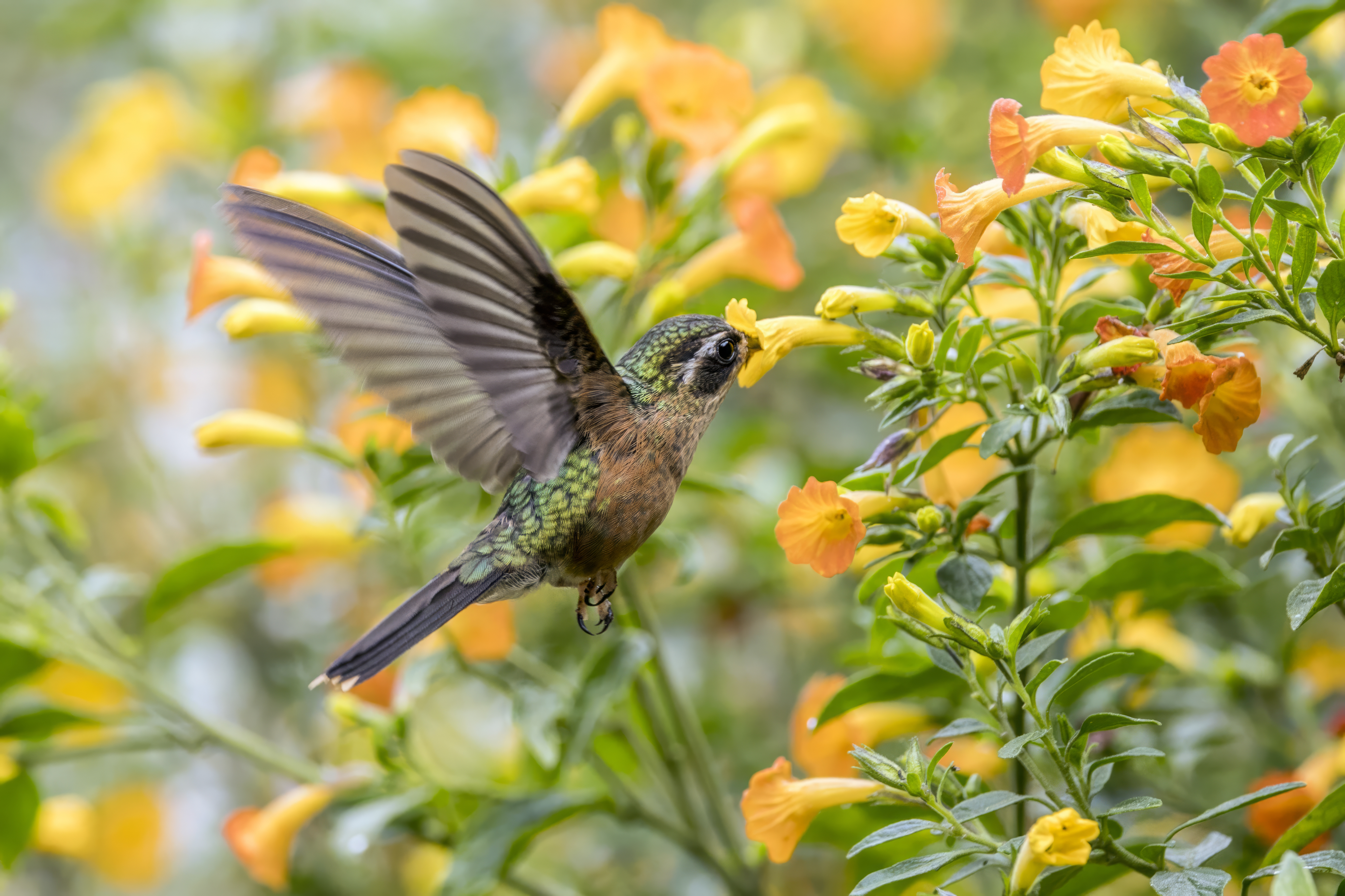
feeding on Campsis

=== Breeding ===
Males do not participate in any part of nest building or brooding of the young, and disengage with female partners after copulation. Though, both males and females may be promiscuous, having multiple partners.

Female speckled hummingbirds incubate and feed nestlings. A clutch consists of two white eggs; measurements consist of 12.4 mm × 8.7 mm and 12.6 mm × 8.6 mm. The incubation period lasts approximately 17–20 days. The species broods for shorter durations than most hummingbirds during incubation. Speckled hummingbirds often travel several kilometers to avoid competition, making visits to the nest less frequent. After the young hatch, the adult continues brooding hatchlings for 7–8 days. After brooding and until the young have fledged, the adult will no longer enter the nest and instead perch nearby, potentially watching for predators. This behavior is curious, as perching outside a nest may alert predators of its location. Nests can be found all year round, and consist of a bulky cup shaped of moss and cobweb, lined with plant fibre. The construction of nests have been observed on moss-covered trunks or on rocky ridges, at the entrance of caves, at a height of 1–3 m.

=== Diet and feeding ===
The species does not gather with others to feed, even on flowering trees. Speckled hummingbirds feed on the nectar of flowers, often near the ground, either from short-tubed flowers or holes at the base of long-tubed flowers. Like other hummingbird species, it is likely that the speckled hummingbird will also feed on insects, for additional nutrients. The species may also collect small insects that are caught on or in the nest.

== Conservation status ==
Not globally threatened (Least Concern). A very common hummingbird of moderate elevations in the Andes. Particularly abundant in the Andes above of Cali, Colombia, with densities of at least 10–12 pairs/km².
