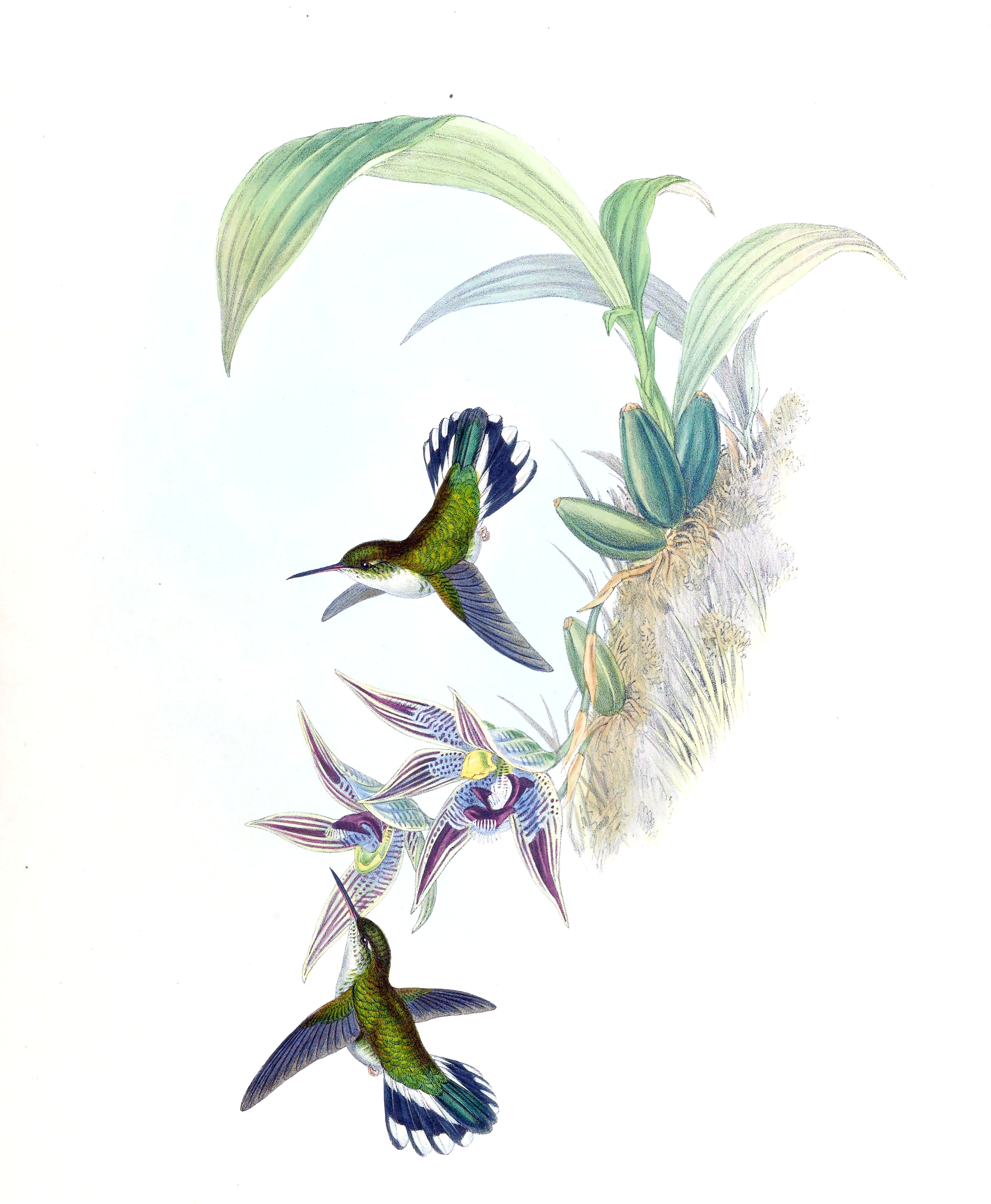
- Ecuadorian piedtail (Phlogophilus hemileucurus)

Scientific classification
- Kingdom: Animalia
- Phylum: Chordata
- Class: Aves
- Order: Apodiformes
- Family: Trochilidae
- Subfamily: Lesbiinae
- Tribe: Lesbiini
- Genus: Phlogophilus; Gould, 1860

= Phlogophilus =

Genus of birds

Phlogophilus, or the piedtails, are a small genus of hummingbirds. It contains two species.

Genus Phlogophilus – Gould, 1860 – two species
Common name	Scientific name and subspecies	Range	Size and ecology	IUCN status and estimated population
Peruvian piedtail	Phlogophilus harterti Berlepsch & Stolzmann, 1901	Peru	Size: Habitat: Diet:	LC
Ecuadorian piedtail	Phlogophilus hemileucurus Gould, 1860	Colombia, Ecuador, and Peru	Size: Habitat: Diet:	LC
