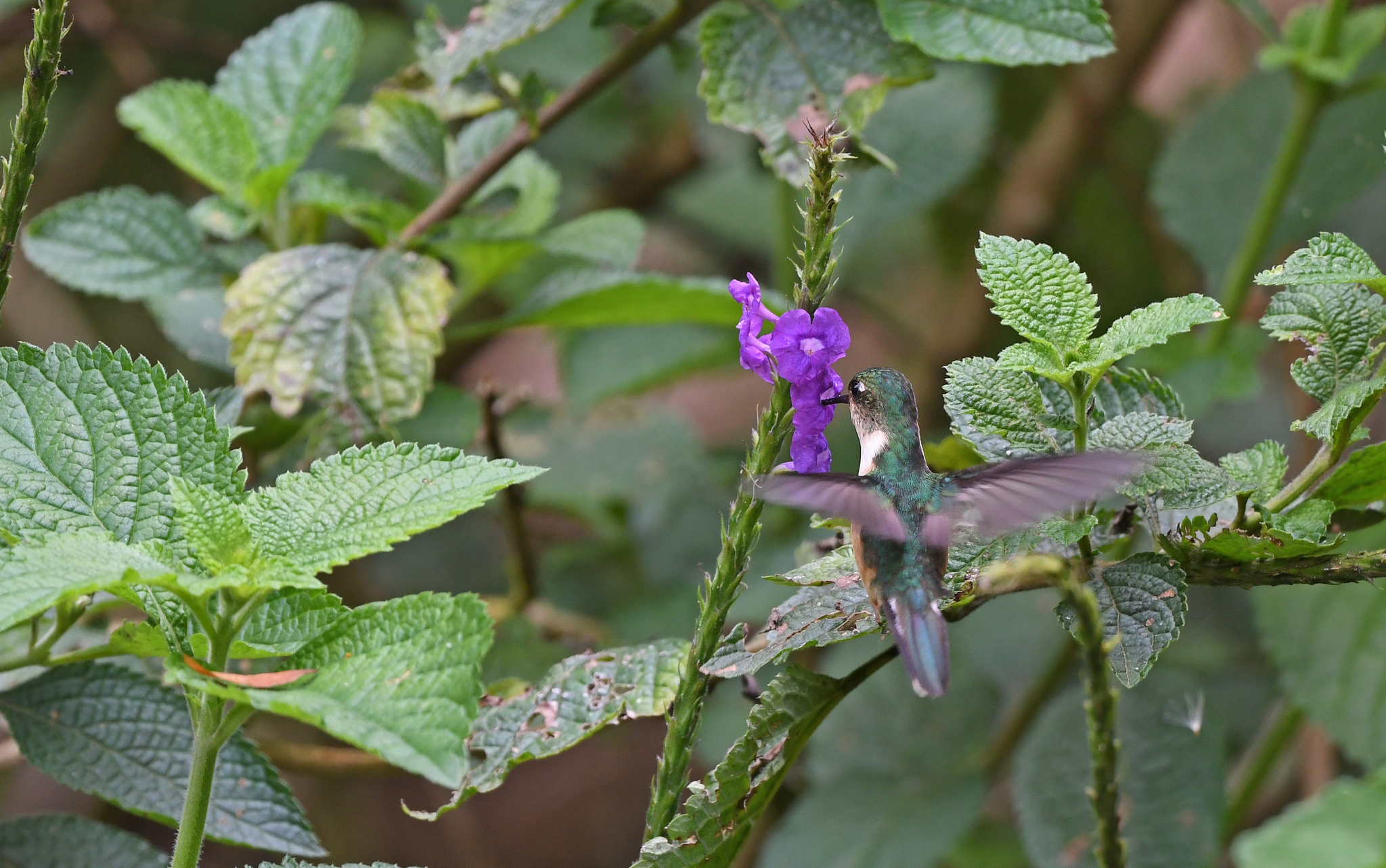

Conservation status
- Least Concern (IUCN 3.1)
- CITES Appendix II (CITES)

Scientific classification
- Kingdom: Animalia
- Phylum: Chordata
- Class: Aves
- Clade: Strisores
- Order: Apodiformes
- Family: Trochilidae
- Genus: Phlogophilus
- Species: P. harterti

Binomial name
- Phlogophilus harterti Berlepsch & Stolzmann, 1901

= Peruvian piedtail =

Species of hummingbird

The Peruvian piedtail (Phlogophilus harterti), locally called Colibrí Colipinto Peruano, is a species of hummingbird in the "coquettes", tribe Lesbiini of subfamily Lesbiinae. It is endemic to Peru.

== Taxonomy and systematics ==
The Peruvian piedtail shares its genus with the Ecuadorian piedtail (P. hemileucurus). It is monotypic.

== Description ==
The Peruvian piedtail is 7.2 to 7.5 cm (2.8 to 3.0 in) long and weighs 2.2 to 2.7 g (0.078 to 0.095 oz). The adult male and female are alike. They have a short, straight, black bill. Their upperparts are green. They have a white spot behind the eye. The throat and center of the breast and belly are white and the rest of the underparts buff. The innermost pair of tail feathers are green with a wide black tip; the others are buff with a wide diagonal black band. Juveniles resemble the adults but their head and neck feathers have buff fringes.

== Distribution and habitat ==
The Peruvian piedtail has a discontinuous distribution in central and southeastern Peru. It occurs in the east Andean foothills of Huánuco, Pasco, Cuzco, and Puno departments. It inhabits the interior of primary and secondary forest. In elevation it is most numerous around 1,000 m (3,300 ft) but ranges between 750 and 1,500 m (2,500 and 4,900 ft).

== Behavior ==
=== Movement ===
The Peruvian piedtail is mostly sedentary but some altitudinal movements are believed to be likely.

=== Feeding ===
The Peruvian piedtail perches to take nectar from flowers and to glean small insects from foliage.

=== Breeding ===
Nothing is known about the Peruvian piedtail's breeding phenology.

=== Vocalization ===
The Peruvian piedtail's song is "a shrill, thin series of notes, which descend sequentially in pitch, 'SIIII siii suuu'."

== Status ==
The IUCN has assessed the Peruvian piedtail as least concern. Though its habitat is generally intact, logging and conversion to agriculture are threats. It "accepts modification of habitat by man, as long as patches of forest and secondary growth remain."
