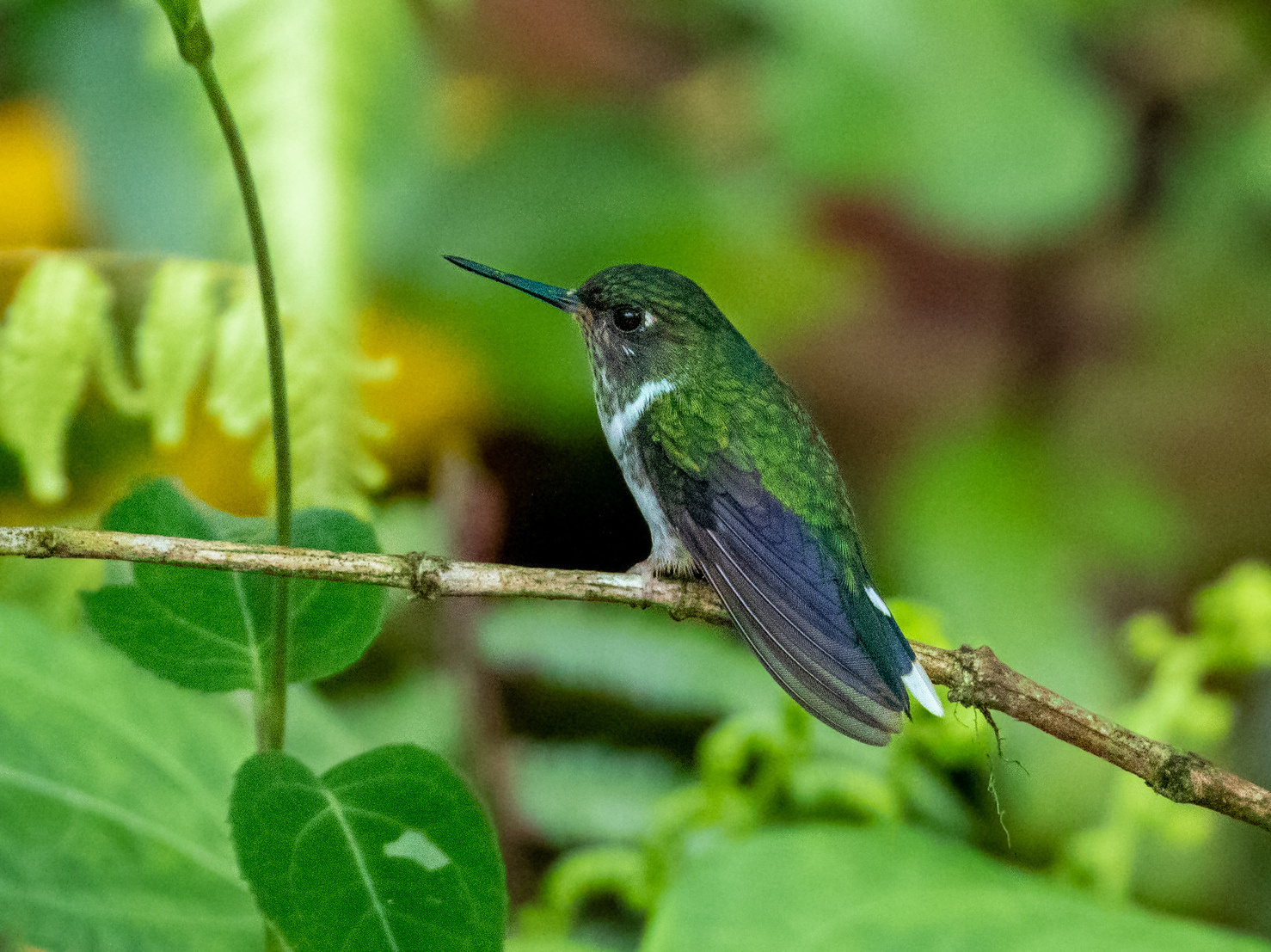

Conservation status
- Least Concern (IUCN 3.1)
- CITES Appendix II

Scientific classification
- Kingdom: Animalia
- Phylum: Chordata
- Class: Aves
- Order: Apodiformes
- Family: Trochilidae
- Genus: Phlogophilus
- Species: P. hemileucurus

Binomial name
- Phlogophilus hemileucurus Gould, 1860

= Ecuadorian piedtail =

Species of hummingbird

The Ecuadorian piedtail (Phlogophilus hemileucurus) is a species of hummingbird in the "coquettes", tribe Lesbiini of subfamily Lesbiinae. It is found in Colombia, Ecuador, and Peru.

== Taxonomy and systematics ==
The Ecuadorian piedtail shares its genus with the Peruvian piedtail (P. harterti). It is monotypic.

== Description ==
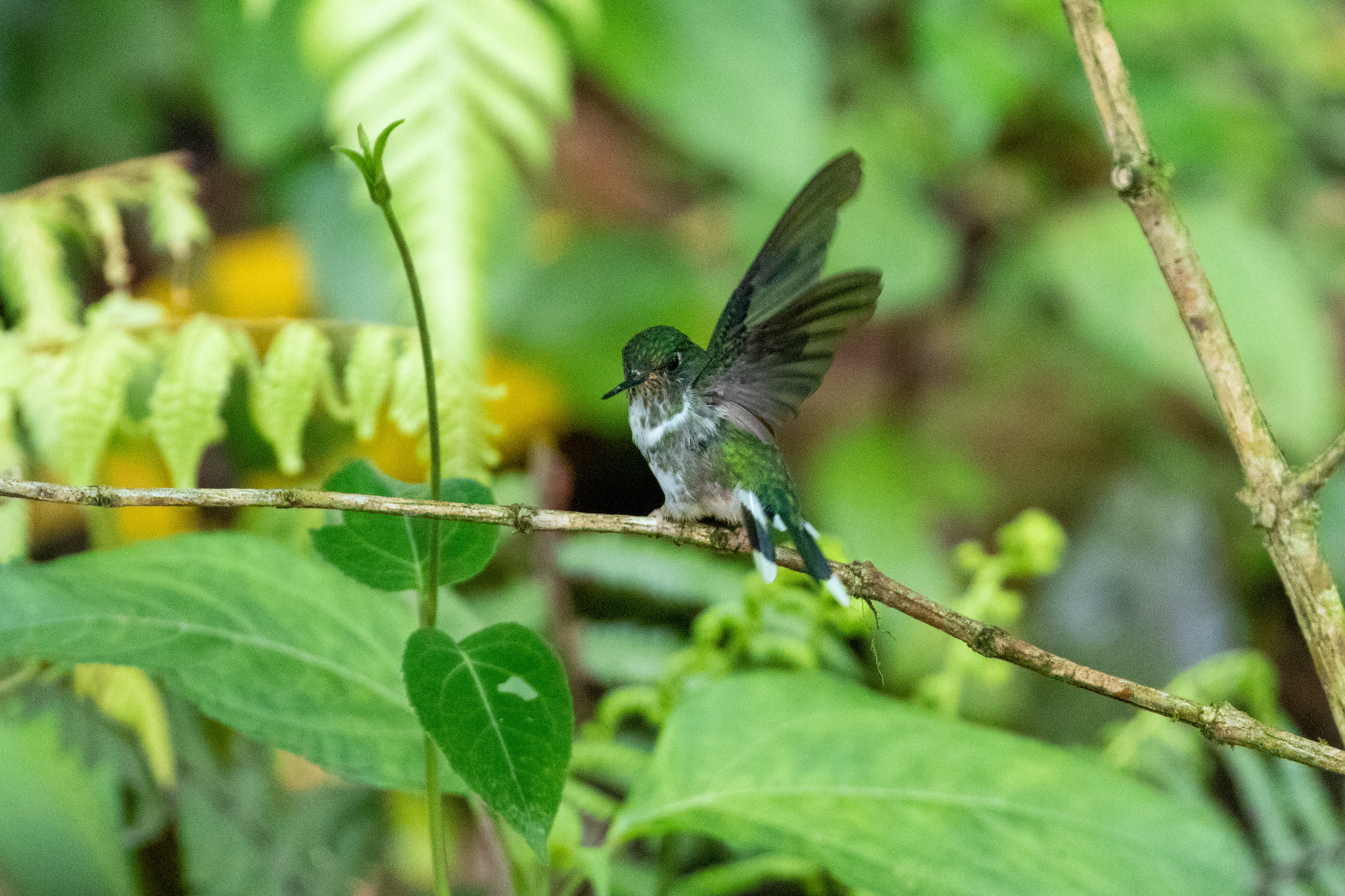
In Peru

The Ecuadorian piedtail is 7.3 to 7.6 cm (2.9 to 3.0 in) long and weighs 2.2 to 3.7 g (0.078 to 0.13 oz). The adult male and female are alike. They have a short, straight, black bill with a yellowish base. Their crown is greenish brown and the rest of the upperparts grass green. They have a white spot behind the eye. The throat and breast are white with green spots with a white band separating them. The belly is whitish. The innermost pair of tail feathers are blue-green; the others are blue with white bases and broad white tips. Juveniles resemble the adults but their head and neck feathers have buff fringes.

== Distribution and habitat ==
The Ecuadorian piedtail is found in the eastern foothills of the Andes from Colombia's Putumayo and Cauca departments south through eastern Ecuador into northeastern Peru's departments of San Martín and Loreto. It inhabits primary forest edges and secondary forest at elevations between 500 and 1,200 m (1,600 and 3,900 ft).

== Behavior ==
=== Movement ===
The Ecuadorian piedtail is mostly sedentary but local altitudinal movements are believed to be likely.

=== Feeding ===
The Ecuadorian piedtail typically forages between 2 and 4 m (7 and 13 ft) above the ground. It perches to take nectar from flowers and to glean small insects from foliage.

=== Breeding ===
The Ecuadorian piedtail's breeding season spans from December to April. The typical nest is a cup of fine rootlets and fern leaf placed 2 to 3 m (7 to 10 ft) above the ground. It is sited in vines or under overhanging thickets. The clutch size is two eggs.

=== Vocalization ===
The Ecuadorian piedtail's song is "a series of typically three high-pitched buzzy notes...followed by several twittering notes 'tzeeeee...tzeee.tzew..tititititi', continuously repeated." Its calls include "a descending series of 3–4 high-pitched 'see' notes..., a repeated 'tsik' note and high-pitched twittering."

== Status ==
The IUCN assesses the Ecuadorian piedtail as least concern. "Much of its habitat is under intense pressure from agriculture and cattle pasture, low-intensity farming, tea and coffee growing, mining operations and logging."
