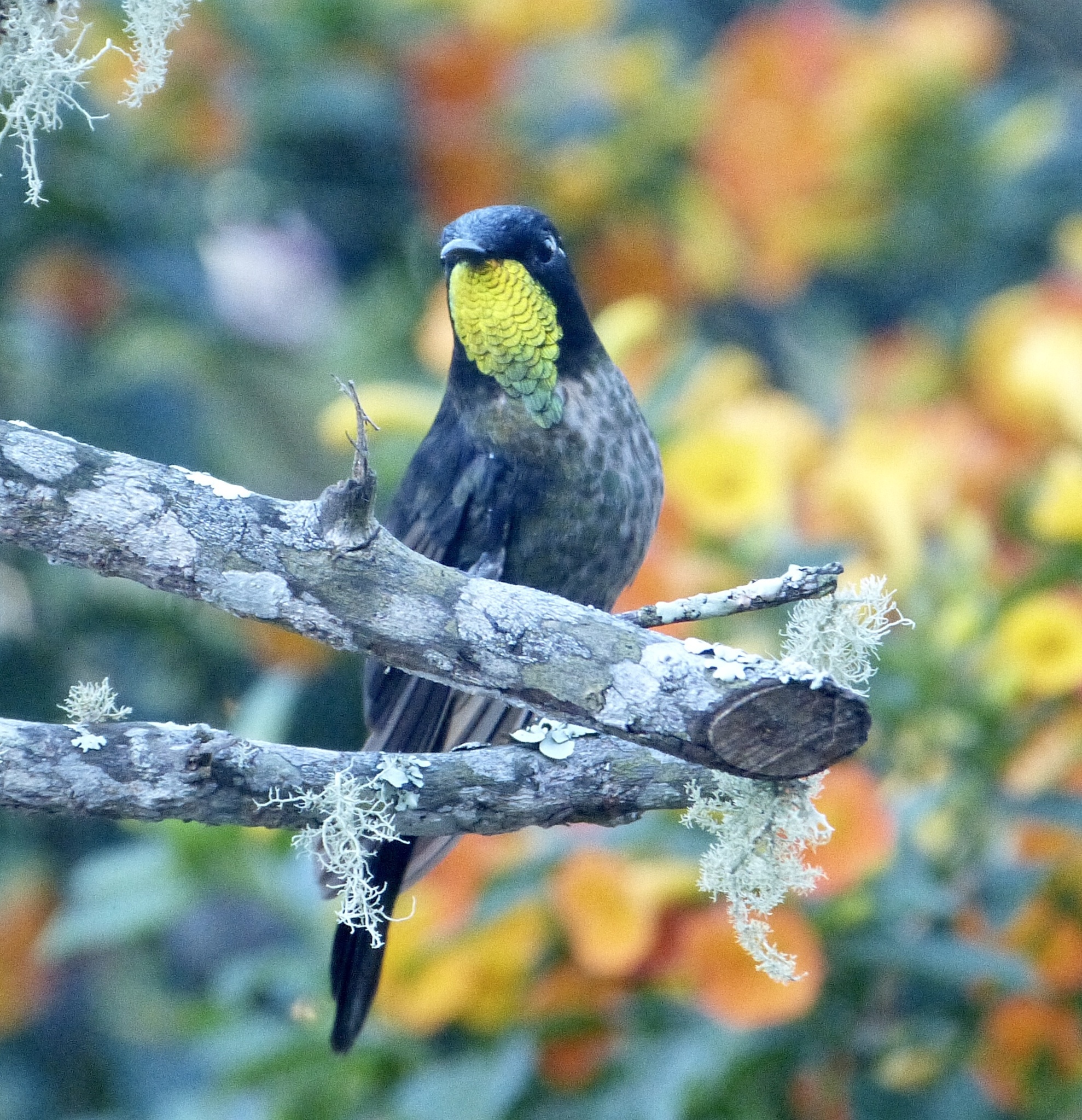
- male

Conservation status
- Near Threatened (IUCN 3.1)
- CITES Appendix II

Scientific classification
- Kingdom: Animalia
- Phylum: Chordata
- Class: Aves
- Clade: Strisores
- Order: Apodiformes
- Family: Trochilidae
- Genus: Ramphomicron
- Species: R. dorsale

Binomial name
- Ramphomicron dorsale Salvin & Godman, 1880

= Black-backed thornbill =

Species of hummingbird

The black-backed thornbill (Ramphomicron dorsale) is a Near Threatened species of hummingbird in the "coquettes", tribe Lesbiini of subfamily Lesbiinae. It is endemic to the Sierra Nevada de Santa Marta of northern Colombia.

== Taxonomy and systematics ==
The black-backed thornbill is monotypic. It shares its genus with the purple-backed thornbill (R. microrhynchum).

== Description ==
The black-backed thornbill is 9 to 10 cm (3.5 to 3.9 in) long and weighs about 3.5 g (0.12 oz). Both sexes have a very short black bill; the male's is slightly decurved. The male's upperparts are velvety black with purplish uppertail coverts and a white spot behind the eye. Their gorget is olive green and the rest of the underparts are a mix of dark gray and rufous with green dots. The tail is moderately long, deeply forked, and purplish black. Females have shining grass green upperparts, and like the male, purplish uppertail coverts and a white spot behind the eye. Their underparts are buffy white with green dots. The tail is shorter than the male's and the outer pair of feathers have white tips.

== Distribution and habitat ==
The black-backed thornbill is restricted to the isolated Sierra Nevada de Santa Marta in far northern Colombia, where it inhabits the edges of humid and elfin forest and also páramo. In elevation it ranges from 2,000 m (6,600 ft) as high as the snowline at about 4,600 m (15,100 ft).

== Behavior ==
=== Movement ===
The black-backed thornbill moves to lower elevations in May and Jun.

=== Feeding ===
The black-backed thornbill forages for nectar at any height from the ground to the canopy. It has been recorded taking nectar from the flowers of Ericaceae, Lobeliaceae, Melastomataceae, and Rubiaceae, and more specifically flowers of genera Erythrina, Puya, and Salvia. It collects nectar while hovering and also by clinging to the flower. In addition it feeds on insects caught on the wing and gleaned from flowers.

=== Breeding ===
Nothing is known about the black-backed thornbill's breeding phenology.

=== Vocalization ===
The black-backed thornbill's calls include "a short dry rattle 'trrr'...a long descending rattle...'tsee-tttrrrrrrrr-tsee', [and] single 'tsee' notes."

== Status ==
The IUCN moved the black-backed thornbill from Least Concern to Endangered in 2011, and in 2023 downlisted the species to Near Threatened. It has a small range; its population size is not known and is believed to be decreasing. Its habitat is under gradual human pressure for conversion to agriculture and grazing. A small part of its range is protected in a national park.
