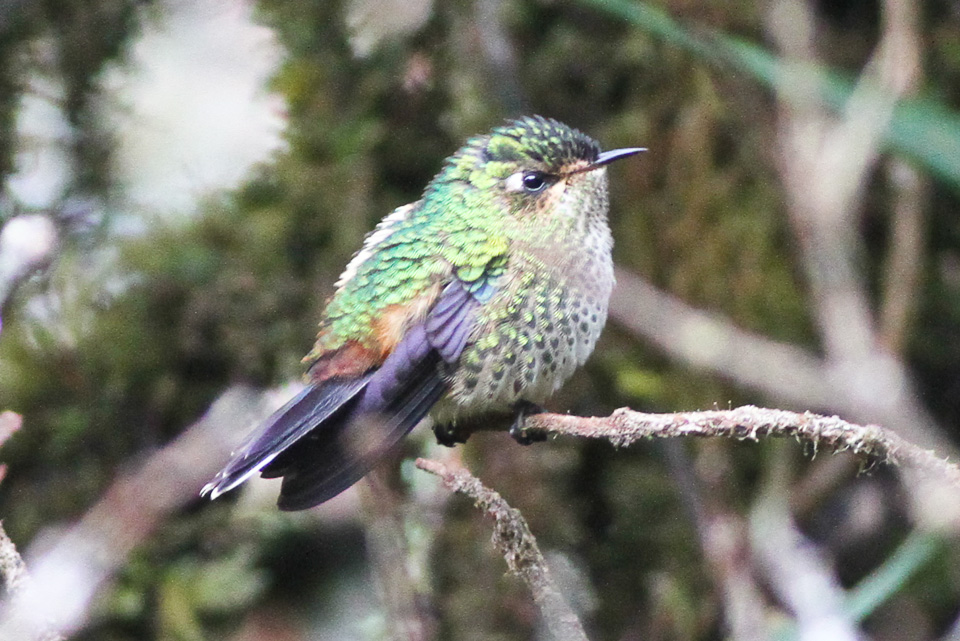
- Female in Puracé National Natural Park, Cauca, Colombia

Conservation status
- Least Concern (IUCN 3.1)
- CITES Appendix II

Scientific classification
- Kingdom: Animalia
- Phylum: Chordata
- Class: Aves
- Order: Apodiformes
- Family: Trochilidae
- Genus: Ramphomicron
- Species: R. microrhynchum

Binomial name
- Ramphomicron microrhynchum (Boissonneau, 1840)
- Distribution of Purple-backed thornbill

= Purple-backed thornbill =

Species of hummingbird

The purple-backed thornbill (Ramphomicron microrhynchum) is a species of hummingbird in the "coquettes", tribe Lesbiini of subfamily Lesbiinae. It is found in Bolivia, Colombia, Ecuador, Peru, and Venezuela.

== Taxonomy and systematics ==
The purple-backed thornbill shares its genus with the black-backed thornbill (R. dorsale). It has these four subspecies:

- R. m. andicola Simon (1921)
- R. m. microrhynchum Boissonneau (1840)
- R. m. albiventre Carriker (1935)
- R. m. bolivianum Schuchmann (1984)

Subspecies R. m. andicola and R. m. albiventre "are doubtfully distinct from [the] nominate."

== Description ==
The purple-backed thornbill is 8 to 9 cm (3.1 to 3.5 in) long and weighs about 3.5 g (0.12 oz). Both sexes have a black bill, the shortest of any hummingbird. Males of the nominate subspecies have metallic violet-purple upperparts with a white spot behind the eye. Their gorget is iridescent golden green, the underparts bronzy green, and the undertail coverts coppery with tawny fringes. The tail is moderately long, forked, and dark purple. Nominate females have shining green upperparts, and like the male, a white spot behind the eye. Their underparts are white with green dots except on the belly. The tail is shorter than the male's and less forked, bronzy purple, and the outer pair of feathers have white tips.

Males of subspecies R. m. andicola have a green-bordered golden gorget and more rufous undertail coverts. R. m. albiventre is very similar to the nominate, but with lighter margins on the male's undertail coverts and smaller spots on the female's underparts. Males of R. m. bolivianum have metallic violet upperparts, dark green underparts, and grayish white undertail coverts.

== Distribution and habitat ==
The subspecies of purple-backed thornbill are found thus:

- R. m. andicola, Andes of western Venezuela, especially Mérida state
- R. m. microrhynchum, Andes of Colombia, Ecuador, and Cajamarca in northwestern Peru
- R. m. albiventre, Andes' eastern slope in Peru from Huánuco south to Apurímac and Cuzco
- R. m. bolivianum, Andes of Cochabamba Department in central Bolivia

The purple-backed thornbill inhabits the edges of humid montane forest, Polylepis forest, páramo, and the transitions between them. R. m. bolivianum also occurs well below the treeline in shrubby areas. In elevation the species ranges from 1,700 to 3,600 m (5,600 to 11,800 ft).

== Behavior ==
=== Movement ===
The purple-backed thornbill moves from lower to higher elevations in the wet season.

=== Feeding ===
The purple-backed thornbill forages for nectar from mid-level to the canopy, primarily by trap-lining. It has often been observed "robbing" nectar from holes in flowers made by Diglossa flowerpiercers. It has been recorded taking nectar from a wide variety of flowering plants, shrubs, and trees. In addition it feeds on insects caught on the wing and gleaned from flowers.

=== Breeding ===
The purple-backed thornbill's breeding season has not been fully defined but appears to span from May possibly to December. It builds a cup nest of fine plant fiber with moss and lichens on the outside on a horizontal branch. The clutch size is two eggs and the incubation period 16 days.

=== Vocalization ===
The purple-backed thornbill's song is "a continuous series of quiet scratchy notes interspersed by short buzzes or dry trills." Its calls include "a short dry rattle 'trrr'..., a scratchy 'krr-kit', and a long twittering rattle."

== Status ==
The IUCN has assessed the purple-backed thornbill as being of Least Concern. It has a large range but its population size is unknown and believed to be decreasing. It is generally uncommon throughout its range. It occurs in several protected areas but outside of them its habitat is under severe threat of deforestation.
