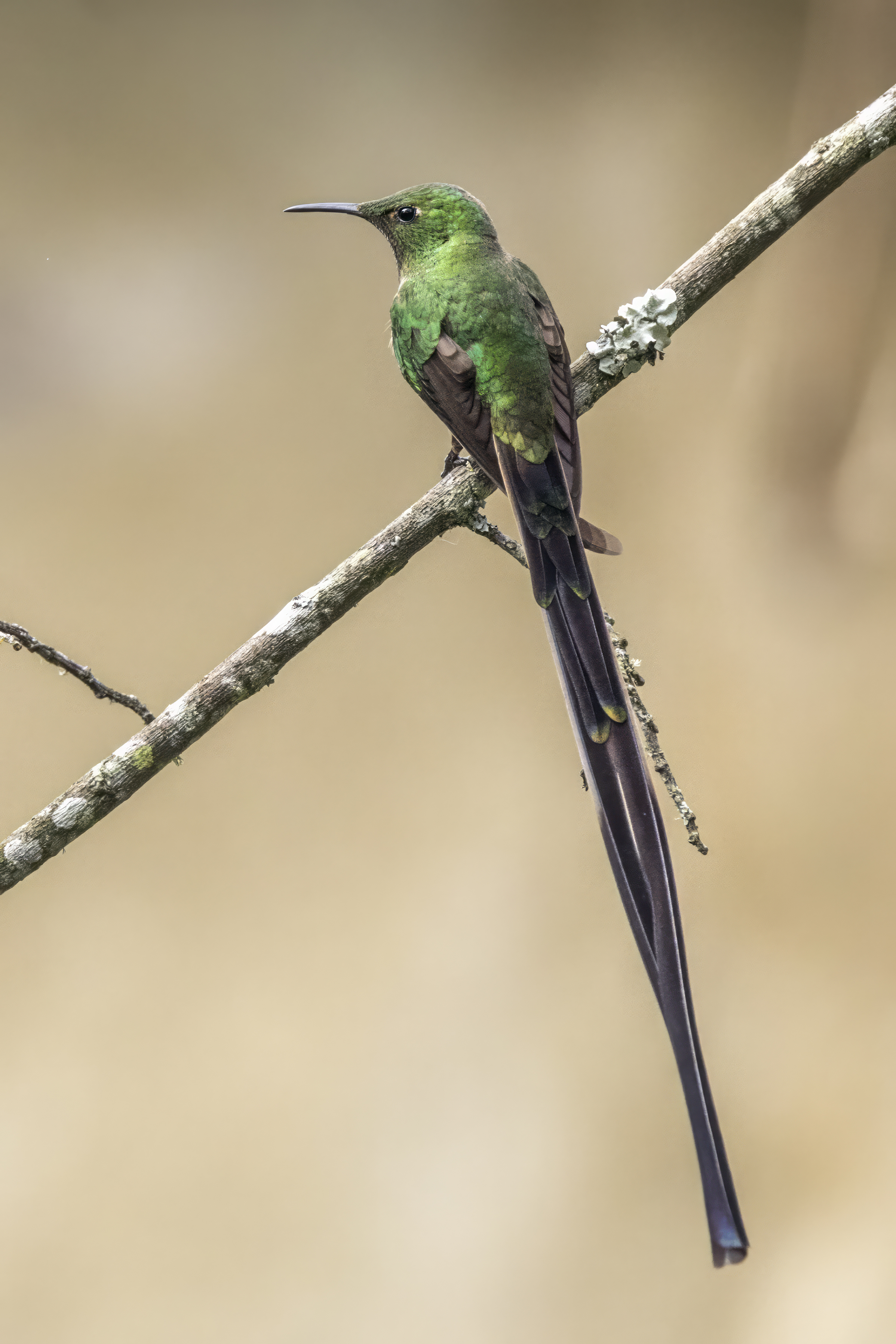
- Male L. v. victoriae Colombia
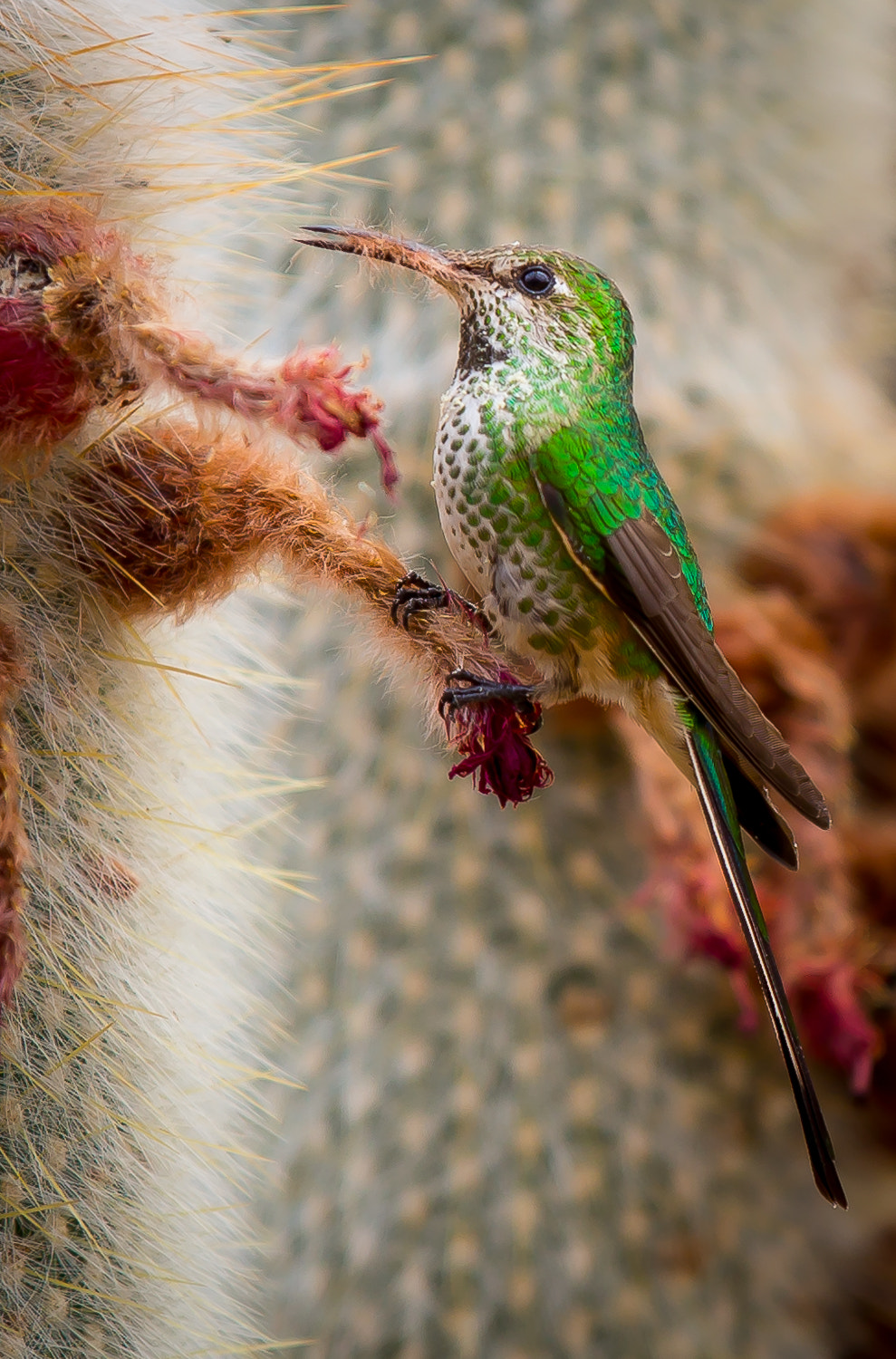
- Female in southern Peru

Conservation status
- Least Concern (IUCN 3.1)
- CITES Appendix II

Scientific classification
- Kingdom: Animalia
- Phylum: Chordata
- Class: Aves
- Order: Apodiformes
- Family: Trochilidae
- Genus: Lesbia
- Species: L. victoriae

Binomial name
- Lesbia victoriae (Bourcier & Mulsant, 1846)
- Range of Lesbia victoriae

= Black-tailed trainbearer =

Species of bird

The black-tailed trainbearer (Lesbia victoriae) is a species of hummingbird in the family Trochilidae. It is found between 2500 and 3800m in Colombia, Ecuador, and Peru. Its natural habitats are subtropical or tropical moist montane forest, subtropical or tropical high-altitude shrubland, and heavily degraded former forest.

== Description ==
Males measure between 21 and 24 centimeters long, including the long tail. They are mostly green, with long black tail feathers and an iridescent green patch on the chest and throat. Females are between 13.5 and 14.5 centimeters in length. They differ from the male in having a shorter tail and white underparts with green spots. The black-tailed trainbearer has a longer, more decurved bill and (in males) a longer, more curved tail than the green-tailed trainbearer, and also tends to be duller green overall.

With a wing length of 59.9mm, Lesbia victoriae victoriae is the largest subspecies in the genus Lesbia.

== Distribution and habitat ==
The black-tailed trainbearer is widely distributed in central and northern Andes from Colombia through Ecuador to Peru, at altitudes between 2500 and 3800 meters.

Three subspecies are currently recognised. Lesbia victoriae victoriae is the northernmost subspecies, occurring from the central Andes of Colombia to southern Ecuador. L. v. juliae is found in the center of the species's distribution, from southern Ecuador to northern Peru. L. v. berlepschi is the southernmost subspecies, occurring from Huánuco to Cuzco in Peru. In the past, Ecuadorian populations of L. v. victoriae were sometimes treated as a fourth subspecies, L. v. aequatorialis, but they aren't different enough from Colombian birds to warrant treatment as a separate subspecies.

Lesbia victoriae prefers semi-open areas instead of closed forest, meaning that it can adapt well to urban ecosystems like parks and gardens.

== Subspecies ==
Three subspecies are currently recognised:

- Lesbia victoriae victoriae (Bourcier & Mulsant, 1846) (including L. v. aequatorialis Boucard, 1893)
- Lesbia victoriae juliae (Hartert, 1899)
- Lesbia victoriae berlepschi (Hellmayr, 1915)

== Behavior ==
The black-tailed trainbearer is not aggressive and is commonly displaced by more aggressive species as the sparkling violetear (Colibri coruscans).

=== Diet ===
The black-tailed trainbearer is a nectar generalist, foraging on flowers of various different sizes and species, mostly near the ground. They complement their diet by consuming small arthropods, in a greater percentage than species occurring at lower altitudes.

=== Reproduction ===
Male courtship behavior consists of flying high and displaying the tail, then diving and making a clicking noise with the tail. Once courtship ends, the couple mates and builds a nest in a bush. They tend to use synthetic fibers from human activity when available.

Males and females both take care of the nest, but tend to shy away when there is danger nearby.

== Conservation status ==
Because of its broad distribution and the size and stability of its populations, the black-tailed trainbearer has been evaluated as least concern by the IUCN. Its preference for open habitats makes this hummingbird relatively resilient to changes in urban and rural areas.
