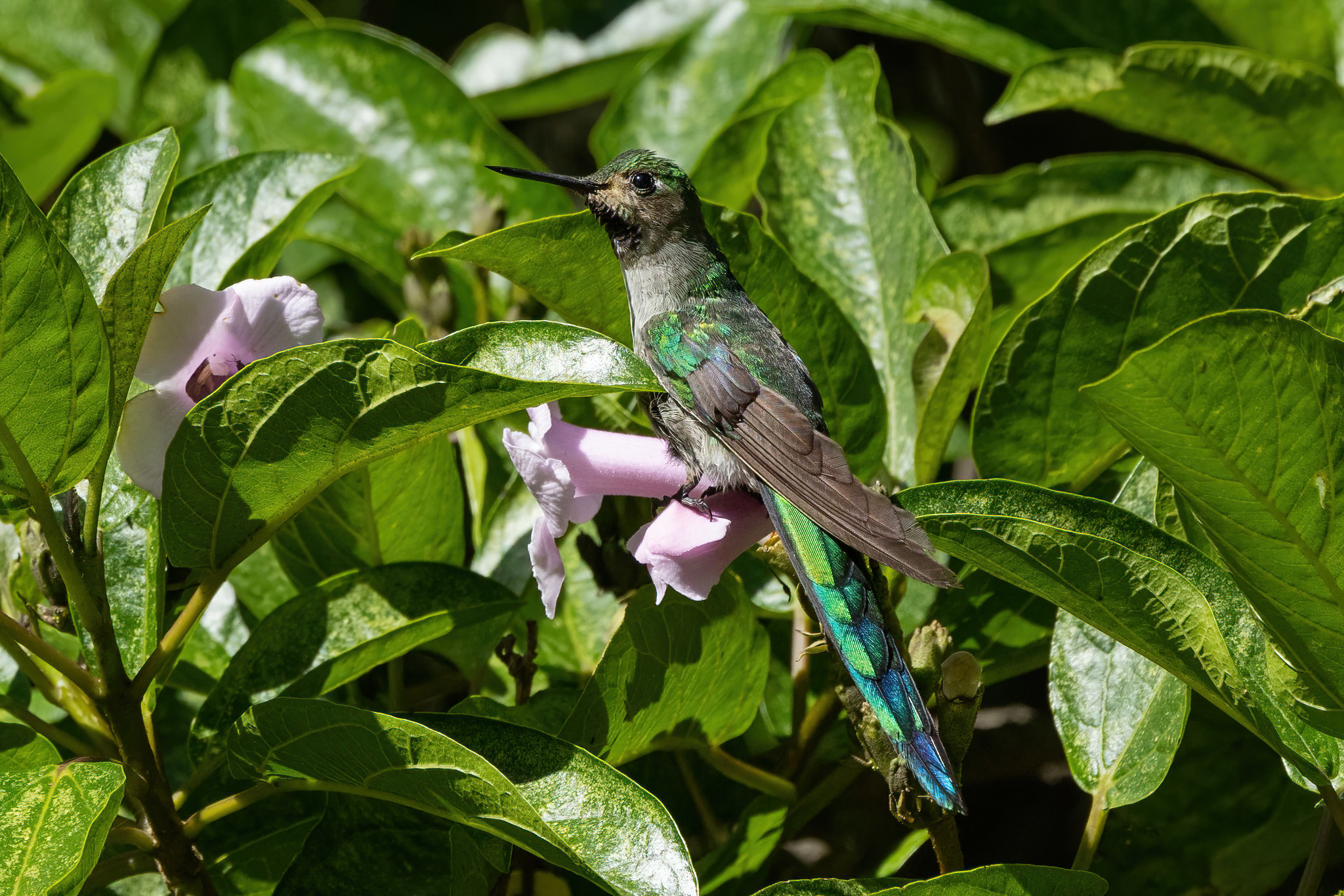

Conservation status
- Endangered (IUCN 3.1)
- CITES Appendix II

Scientific classification
- Kingdom: Animalia
- Phylum: Chordata
- Class: Aves
- Order: Apodiformes
- Family: Trochilidae
- Tribe: Lesbiini
- Genus: Taphrolesbia; Simon, 1918
- Species: T. griseiventris

Binomial name
- Taphrolesbia griseiventris (Taczanowski, 1883)

= Grey-bellied comet =

Species of bird

The grey-bellied comet (Taphrolesbia griseiventris) is a species of hummingbird in the family Trochilidae. It is found only in a few small areas of Peru. Its natural habitats are subtropical or tropical high-altitude shrubland and rural gardens. It is threatened by habitat loss.

== Description ==
The grey-bellied comet is a large hummingbird with a long beak and a deeply forked tail, growing to 14 to 17 centimetres (5.5 to 6.7 in). The upperparts are bronzy-green and the long green tail feathers have orangeish tips. The underparts are grey and the male has a blue throat. The tail of the female is shorter than that of the male. Both sexes have a small white spot behind the eye.

== Habitat ==
The grey-bellied comet has a limited range which contributes to its currently being endangered. The bird has been found living in five separate, but close sites in north central Peru in the Andes mountains. The grey-bellied comet inhabits areas of steep, rocky, and dry slopes with some vegetation. The bird mainly lives at altitudes of 2,750 to 3,170 metres (9,020 to 10,400 ft) above sea level.

== Ecological role ==
The grey-bellied comet plays a similar role as other hummingbirds in pollinating woody shrubs and trees.

== Population and conservation status ==
Estimates in 2012 for the grey-bellied comet put the population at around 375 to 1,499 individual birds. Habitat modification and loss are the largest contributing factor to the species declining population. Human modification to the habitat with agriculture is fragmenting and decreasing the already small portion of land the bird inhabits. The IUCN has listed the bird as being "Endangered".
