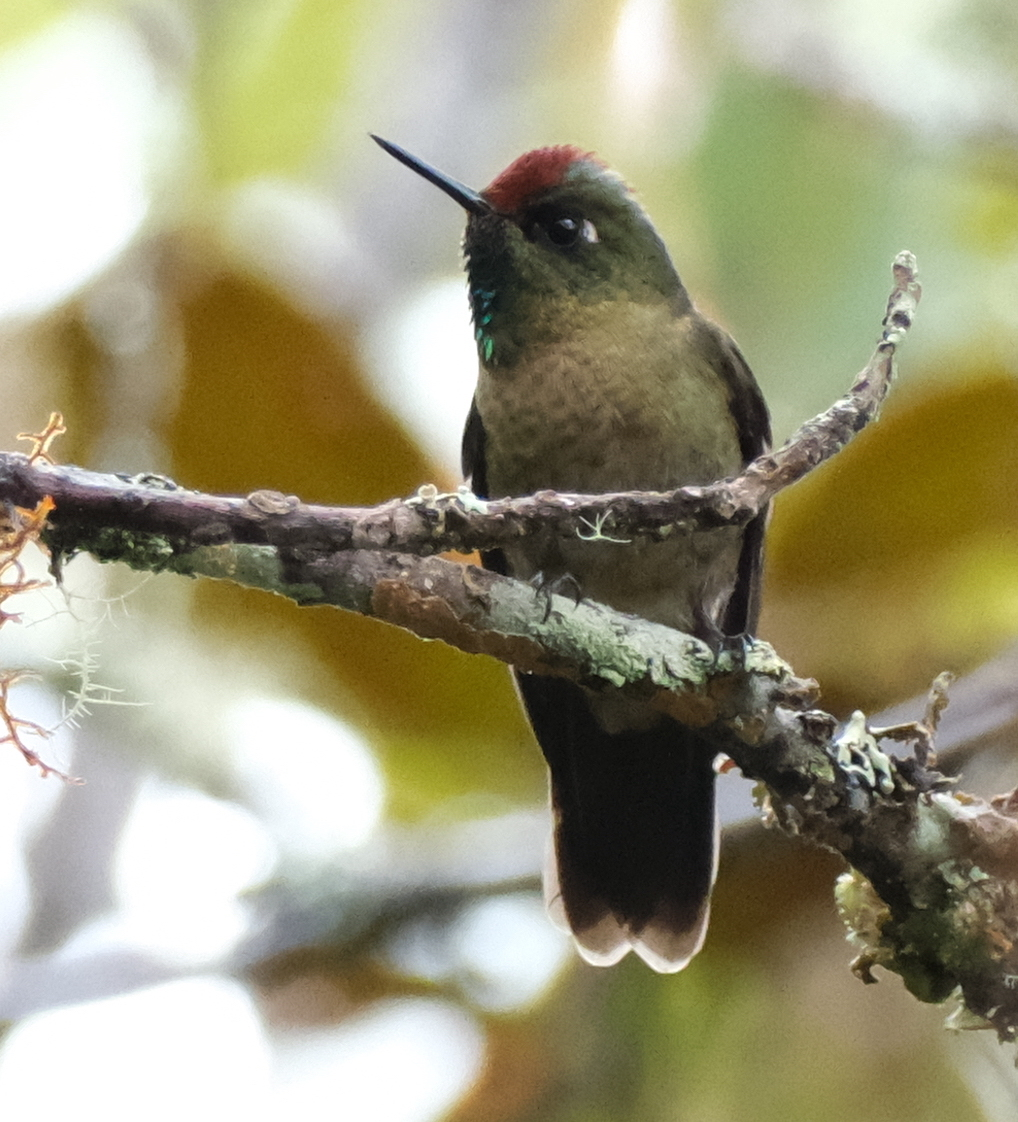

Conservation status
- Least Concern (IUCN 3.1)
- CITES Appendix II

Scientific classification
- Kingdom: Animalia
- Phylum: Chordata
- Class: Aves
- Order: Apodiformes
- Family: Trochilidae
- Genus: Chalcostigma
- Species: C. ruficeps

Binomial name
- Chalcostigma ruficeps (Gould, 1846)

= Rufous-capped thornbill =

Species of hummingbird

The rufous-capped thornbill (Chalcostigma ruficeps) is a species of hummingbird in the "coquettes", tribe Lesbiini of subfamily Lesbiinae. It is found in Bolivia, Ecuador, and Peru.

== Taxonomy and systematics ==
The taxonomy of genus Chalcostigma and of the rufous-capped thornbill in particular are unsettled. The South American Classification Committee (SACC) of the American Ornithological Society is considering a proposal to merge the genus into Oxypogon. The species was for a time placed in genus Metallura with the Perijá metaltail (M. iracunda) and also has been assigned its own genus, Selatopogon. The rufous-capped thornbill is monotypic.

== Description ==
The rufous-capped thornbill is about 10.5 cm (4.1 in) long and weighs 3.3 to 3.9 g (0.12 to 0.14 oz). Both sexes have a very short black bill. The male's crown is mahogany red and the rest of the upperparts bottle green. It has a narrow emerald green gorget with a border of various shades of yellow. Its underparts are rufous with green mottling that is strongest on the flanks. The tail is dull olive green. The female's upperparts including the crown are bottle green. Its throat and breast are ochre-orange with olive green dots. Its outer tail feathers have pale tips.

== Distribution and habitat ==
The rufous-capped thornbill is found on the east slope of the Andes from southeastern Ecuador's Zamora-Chinchipe Province through Peru into Bolivia as far as Cochabamba Department. It has also been recorded as a vagrant in Colombia. It inhabits a variety of montane landscapes including humid secondary forest, humid montane forest, and cloudforest. In elevation it mostly ranges between 1,400 and 3,500 m (4,600 and 11,500 ft) but occurs as high as 3,500 m (11,500 ft); it is most common around 2,500 m (8,200 ft).

== Behavior ==
=== Movement ===
The rufous-capped thornbill possibly makes seasonal elevational movements.

=== Feeding ===
The rufous-capped thornbill feeds on nectar from a variety of flowers, mostly in the family Melastomataceae. It usually nectars by clinging to the flower and rarely by hovering. It sometimes "robs" nectar by piercing the base of a flower or by feeding at holes made by Diglossa flowerpiercers. It forages from low to medium level, and males defend feeding territories. It also feeds on insects but its usual method of capture has not been determined.

=== Breeding ===
The rufous-capped thornbill's breeding season spans from December to March in Bolivia and perhaps July to October in Peru. The female alone incubates the two white eggs. Nothing else has been documented about its breeding phenology.

=== Vocalization ===
The rufous-capped thornbill's vocalizations are not well known, but do include "a short dry double rattle 'trr-trr'" and "a rising/falling twitter 't-tr-tr-tsee-tseee-tititrrr'."

== Status ==
The IUCN has assessed the rufous-capped thornbill as being of Least Concern. It has a large range but its population size is unknown and believed to be decreasing. It is generally uncommon but appears to tolerate some human-caused environmental changes.
