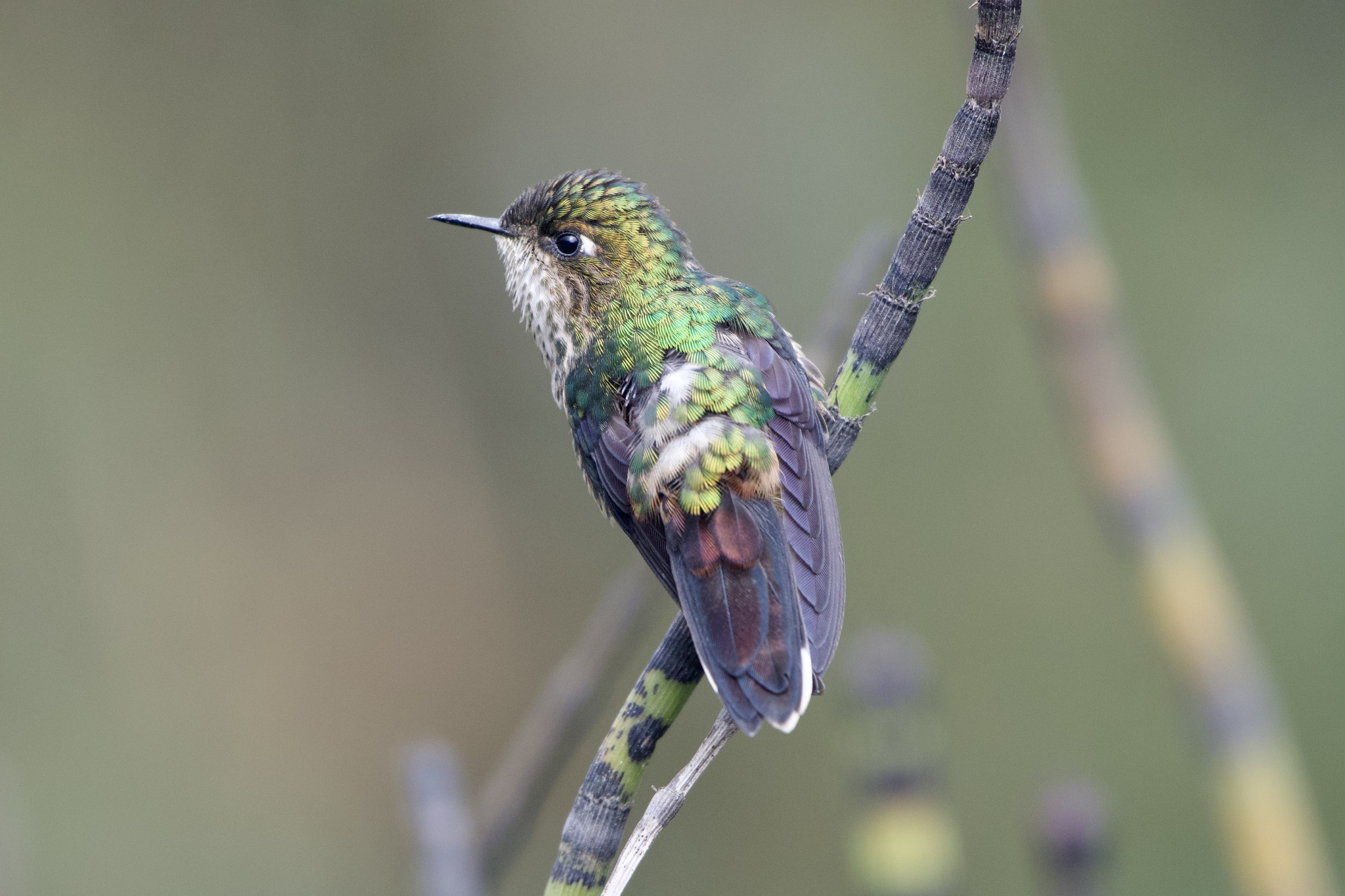

Scientific classification
- Kingdom: Animalia
- Phylum: Chordata
- Class: Aves
- Order: Apodiformes
- Family: Trochilidae
- Tribe: Lesbiini
- Genus: Ramphomicron; Bonaparte, 1850

Type species
- Ornismya microrhyncha Boissonneau, 1840

= Ramphomicron =

Genus of birds

Ramphomicron is a genus of hummingbird in the family Trochilidae.

== Species ==
It contains two species:

Genus Ramphomicron – Bonaparte, 1850 – two species
Common name	Scientific name and subspecies	Range	Size and ecology	IUCN status and estimated population
Black-backed thornbill	Ramphomicron dorsale Salvin & Godman, 1880	Colombia	Size: Habitat: Diet:	EN
Purple-backed thornbill	Ramphomicron microrhynchum (Boissonneau, 1840) Four subspecies: R. m. andicola Simon (1921); R. m. microrhynchum Boissonneau (1840); R. m. albiventre Carriker (1935); R. m. bolivianum Schuchmann (1984)	Bolivia, Colombia, Ecuador, Peru, and Venezuela	Size: Habitat: Diet:	LC
