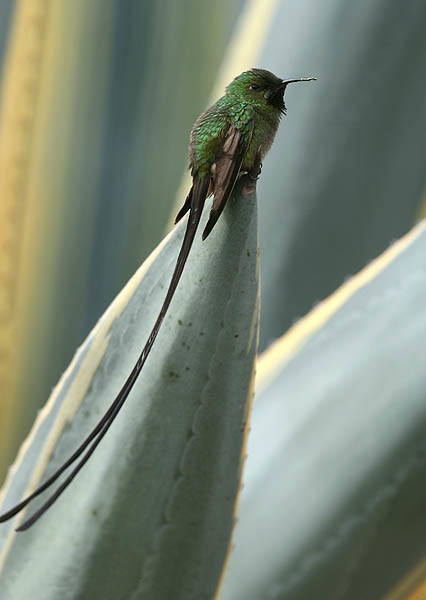
- Black-tailed trainbearer, Lesbia victoriae

Scientific classification
- Kingdom: Animalia
- Phylum: Chordata
- Class: Aves
- Order: Apodiformes
- Family: Trochilidae
- Tribe: Lesbiini
- Genus: Lesbia; Lesson, 1833

Type species
- Ornismya nuna Lesson, 1832

Species
- L. victoriae L. nuna

= Trainbearer =

Genus of birds

Lesbia is a small genus of hummingbird. Its two members, both known as trainbearers, are found in tropical South America. They are:

Genus Lesbia – Lesson, 1833 – two species
Common name	Scientific name and subspecies	Range	Size and ecology	IUCN status and estimated population
Black-tailed trainbearer Male Female	Lesbia victoriae (Bourcier & Mulsant, 1846) Three subspecies: L. v. victoriae (Bourcier & Mulsant, 1846); L. v. juliae (Hartert, 1899); L. v. berlepschi (Hellmayr, 1915)	Colombia, Ecuador, and Peru	Size: Habitat: Diet:	LC
Green-tailed trainbearer Male Female	Lesbia nuna (Lesson, 1832) Six subspecies: L. n. gouldii Loddiges (1832); L. n. gracilis Gould (1846); L. n. aureliae Weller & Schuchmann (2004); L. n. pallidiventris Simon (1902); L. n. huallagae Weller & Schuchmann (2004); L. n. nuna Lesson (1832)	Bolivia, Colombia, Ecuador, Peru, and Venezuela	Size: Habitat: Diet:	LC
