= Racket-tail (disambiguation) =

Racket-tail is the common name for a genus of parrots (Prioniturus) from south-east Asia.

Racket-tail or racquet-tail may also refer to:

== Birds ==
- Racket-tailed coquette (Discosura longicaudus), a hummingbird species from South America
- Racket-tailed roller (Coracias spatulatus), a bird species from Africa
- Racket-tailed treepie (Crypsirina temia), a bird species from Asia
- Racquet-tailed kingfisher or common paradise kingfisher (Tanysiptera galatea), a bird species from Asia
- Racket-tailed drongo:
  - Greater racket-tailed drongo (Dicrurus paradiseus), a bird species from Asia
  - Lesser racket-tailed drongo (Dicrurus remifer), a bird species from Asia

== Other ==
- Dorocordulia libera, the racket-tailed emerald, a dragonfly species from North America

== See also ==
- Booted racket-tail
