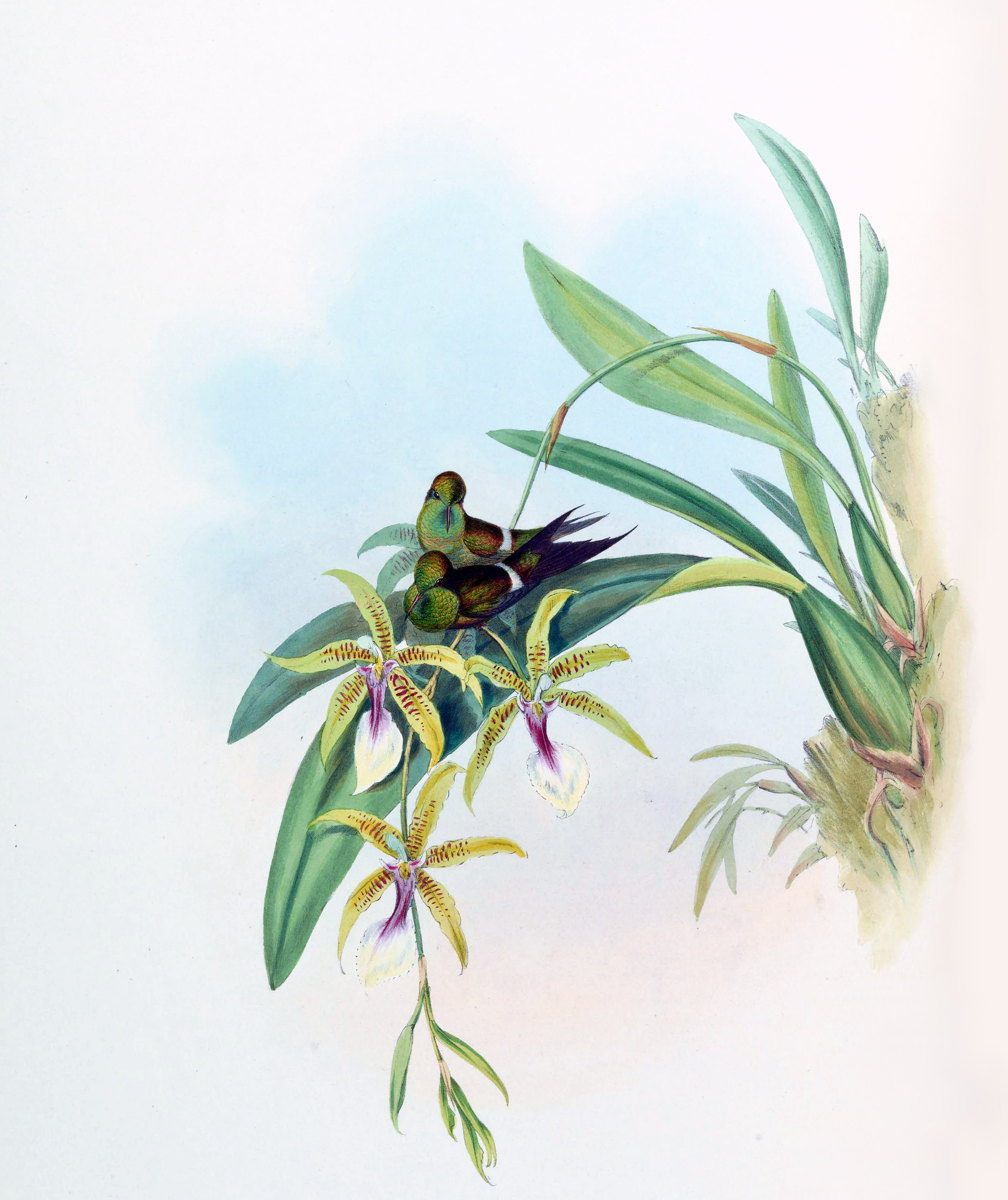
- Illustration by John Gould

Conservation status
- Data Deficient (IUCN 3.1)
- CITES Appendix II

Scientific classification
- Kingdom: Animalia
- Phylum: Chordata
- Class: Aves
- Order: Apodiformes
- Family: Trochilidae
- Genus: Discosura
- Species: D. letitiae

Binomial name
- Discosura letitiae (Bourcier & Mulsant, 1852)

Synonyms
- Popelairia letitiae (Bourcier & Mulsant, 1852)

= Letitia's thorntail =

Species of hummingbird

Letitia's thorntail (Discosura letitiae), also known as the coppery thorntail, is a very poorly known species of hummingbird in the "coquettes" tribe Lesbiini of subfamily Lesbiinae. It was named after Letizia del Gallo Roccagiovine (1848–1863), granddaughter of the ornithologist Charles Bonaparte.

== Taxonomy and systematics ==
Letitia's thorntail is only known from two old male specimens described as from Bolivia. Localities for old skins often are unreliable, and it is possible they came from elsewhere. Consequently, its behavior and habitat are unknown but are likely similar to those of other thorntails. It has been suggested that it represented a hybrid or a variant of the racquet-tailed coquette, but a study by G.R. Graves has supported its status as a distinct species. Graves suggested the English name of Letitia's coquette because the specimens' tail feathers more closely resemble those of coquettes than those of thorntails.

== Description ==
Graves described the specimens of Letitia's thorntail, but noted that the perceived colors of hummingbirds depend on the lighting and the observer's angle of view. The crown is brilliant golden-green that blends to dark bronze-green on the back with some coppery-bronze iridescence. The lower back is crossed by a narrow white band below which is a coppery red to coppery purple rump and bronze-green uppertail coverts. The chin and upper breast are golden-green like the crown with a diffuse pale pectoral band below the latter. The midline of the lower breast is bronze-green with coppery red spangles. The lower belly and flanks are buffy- to grayish white, the vent is dark gray, and the undertail coverts dark green with rufous tips. One specimen lacks the central tail feathers; the other specimen's are bronze-green with broad black tips. The other tail feathers are brownish black. The tail feathers are progressively longer from the innermost to the outermost but the outermost are not as dramatically longer as in other thorntails.

== Status ==
The IUCN has assessed Letitia's thorntail as Data Deficient. Its "distribution [is] uncertain due to doubts over provenance of specimens" so it is possible that the species still exists undetected elsewhere than Bolivia.
