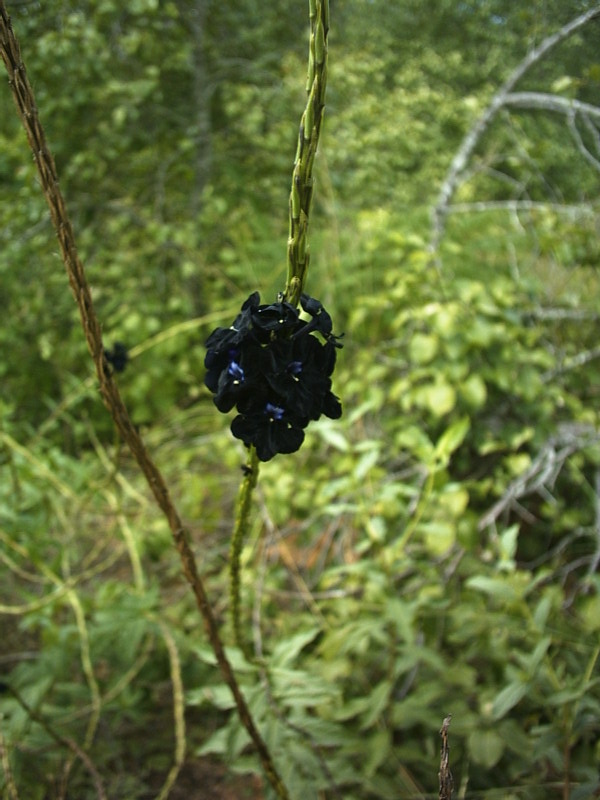
- Unidentified black-flowered Stachytarpheta, Médanos del Chaco National Park (Paraguay)

Scientific classification
- Kingdom: Plantae
- Clade: Tracheophytes
- Clade: Angiosperms
- Clade: Eudicots
- Clade: Asterids
- Order: Lamiales
- Family: Verbenaceae
- Genus: Stachytarpheta; Vahl

Synonyms
- Ubochea Baill.

= Stachytarpheta =

Genus of flowering plants in the vervain family Verbenaceae

Stachytarpheta is a plant genus in the verbena family (Verbenaceae). The flowers are rich in nectar and popular with many butterflies, such as the South Asian crimson rose, Malabar banded swallowtail, and grass yellow. Hummingbirds, especially small species like Lophornis coquettes, Chlorostilbon emeralds, and Discosura thorntails, are especially attracted for nectar. Several species in this genus are known as porterweeds. In Australia the genus is known as snakeweed.

== Species ==
Species include:

- Stachytarpheta × abortiva Danser
- Stachytarpheta acuminata DC. ex Schauer
- Stachytarpheta × adulterina Urb. & Ekman
- Stachytarpheta ajugifolia Schauer
- Stachytarpheta alata (Moldenke) S.Atkins
- Stachytarpheta albiflora DC. ex Schauer
- Stachytarpheta almasensis Mansf.
- Stachytarpheta amplexicaulis Moldenke
- Stachytarpheta andersonii Moldenke
- Stachytarpheta angolensis Moldenke
- Stachytarpheta arenaria S.Atkins
- Stachytarpheta atriflora S.Atkins
- Stachytarpheta bicolor Hook.f.
- Stachytarpheta boldinghii Moldenke
- Stachytarpheta brasiliensis Moldenke
- Stachytarpheta bromleyana S.Atkins
- Stachytarpheta caatingensis S.Atkins
- Stachytarpheta cajamarcensis Moldenke
- Stachytarpheta calderonii Moldenke
- Stachytarpheta candida Moldenke
- Stachytarpheta canescens Kunth
- Stachytarpheta cassiae S.Atkins
- Stachytarpheta cayennensis (Rich.) Vahl
- Stachytarpheta cearensis Moldenke
- Stachytarpheta coccinea Schauer
- Stachytarpheta commutata Schauer
- Stachytarpheta confertifolia Moldenke
- Stachytarpheta crassifolia Schrad.
- Stachytarpheta dawsonii Moldenke
- Stachytarpheta × debilis Danser
- Stachytarpheta diamantinensis Moldenke
- Stachytarpheta discolor Cham.
- Stachytarpheta elegans Welw.
- Stachytarpheta fallax A.E.Gonç.
- Stachytarpheta frantzii Pol.
- Stachytarpheta friedrichsthalii Hayek
- Stachytarpheta froesii Moldenke
- Stachytarpheta fruticosa (Millsp.) B.L.Rob.
- Stachytarpheta galactea S.Atkins
- Stachytarpheta ganevii S.Atkins
- Stachytarpheta gesnerioides Cham.
- Stachytarpheta glabra Cham.
- Stachytarpheta glandulosa S.Atkins
- Stachytarpheta glauca (Pohl) Walp.
- Stachytarpheta glazioviana S.Atkins
- Stachytarpheta × gracilis Danser
- Stachytarpheta grisea Moldenke
- Stachytarpheta guedesii S.Atkins
- Stachytarpheta harleyi S.Atkins
- Stachytarpheta hassleri Briq.
- Stachytarpheta hatschbachii Moldenke
- Stachytarpheta hintonii Moldenke
- Stachytarpheta hirsutissima Link
- Stachytarpheta hispida Nees & Mart.
- Stachytarpheta × hybrida Moldenke
- Stachytarpheta indica (L.) Vahl
- Stachytarpheta integrifolia (Pohl) Walp.
- Stachytarpheta × intercedens Danser
- Stachytarpheta itambensis S.Atkins
- Stachytarpheta jamaicensis (L.) Vahl
- Stachytarpheta kingii Moldenke
- Stachytarpheta lactea Schauer
- Stachytarpheta lacunosa Mart. ex Schauer
- Stachytarpheta laevis Moldenke
- Stachytarpheta lanata Schauer
- Stachytarpheta linearis Moldenke
- Stachytarpheta longiflora Turcz.
- Stachytarpheta longispicata (Pohl) S.Atkins
- Stachytarpheta lopez-palacii Moldenke
- Stachytarpheta luisana (Standl.) Standl.
- Stachytarpheta lundellae Moldenke
- Stachytarpheta lychnitis Mart. ex Schauer
- Stachytarpheta lythrophylla Schauer
- Stachytarpheta macedoi Moldenke
- Stachytarpheta marginata Vahl
- Stachytarpheta martiana Schauer
- Stachytarpheta matogrossensis Moldenke
- Stachytarpheta maximiliani Schauer
- Stachytarpheta meninii
- Stachytarpheta mexiae Moldenke
- Stachytarpheta microphylla Walp.
- Stachytarpheta miniacea Moldenke
- Stachytarpheta monachinoi Moldenke
- Stachytarpheta mutabilis (Jacq.) Vahl
- Stachytarpheta orubica (L.) Vahl
- Stachytarpheta pachystachya Mart. ex Schauer
- Stachytarpheta paraguariensis Moldenke
- Stachytarpheta peruviana Moldenke
- Stachytarpheta petenensis Moldenke
- Stachytarpheta piranii S.Atkins
- Stachytarpheta pohliana Cham.
- Stachytarpheta polyura Schauer
- Stachytarpheta procumbens Moldenke
- Stachytarpheta puberula (Moldenke) S.Atkins
- Stachytarpheta pycnodonta Urb.
- Stachytarpheta quadrangula Nees & Mart.
- Stachytarpheta quirosana Moldenke
- Stachytarpheta radlkoferiana Mansf.
- Stachytarpheta restingensis Moldenke
- Stachytarpheta reticulata Mart. ex Schauer
- Stachytarpheta rhomboidalis (Pohl) Walp.
- Stachytarpheta rivularis Moldenke
- Stachytarpheta robinsoniana Moldenke
- Stachytarpheta rupestris S.Atkins
- Stachytarpheta scaberrima Cham.
- Stachytarpheta schottiana Schauer
- Stachytarpheta sellowiana Schauer
- Stachytarpheta sericea S.Atkins
- Stachytarpheta sessilis Moldenke
- Stachytarpheta simplex Hayek
- Stachytarpheta spathulata Moldenke
- Stachytarpheta speciosa Pohl ex Schauer
- Stachytarpheta sprucei Moldenke
- Stachytarpheta stannardii S.Atkins
- Stachytarpheta steyermarkii Moldenke
- Stachytarpheta straminea Moldenke
- Stachytarpheta strigosa Vahl
- Stachytarpheta subincisa Turcz.
- Stachytarpheta svensonii Moldenke
- Stachytarpheta tabascana Moldenke
- Stachytarpheta trimeni Rech.
- Stachytarpheta × trimenii Rech.
- Stachytarpheta trinitensis Moldenke
- Stachytarpheta trispicata Nees & Mart.
- Stachytarpheta tuberculata S.Atkins
- Stachytarpheta urticifolia (Salisb.) Sims
- Stachytarpheta velutina Moldenke
- Stachytarpheta villosa (Pohl) Cham.
- Stachytarpheta violacea Miranda
- Stachytarpheta viscidula Schauer
- Stachytarpheta weberbaueri Moldenke

== Gallery ==
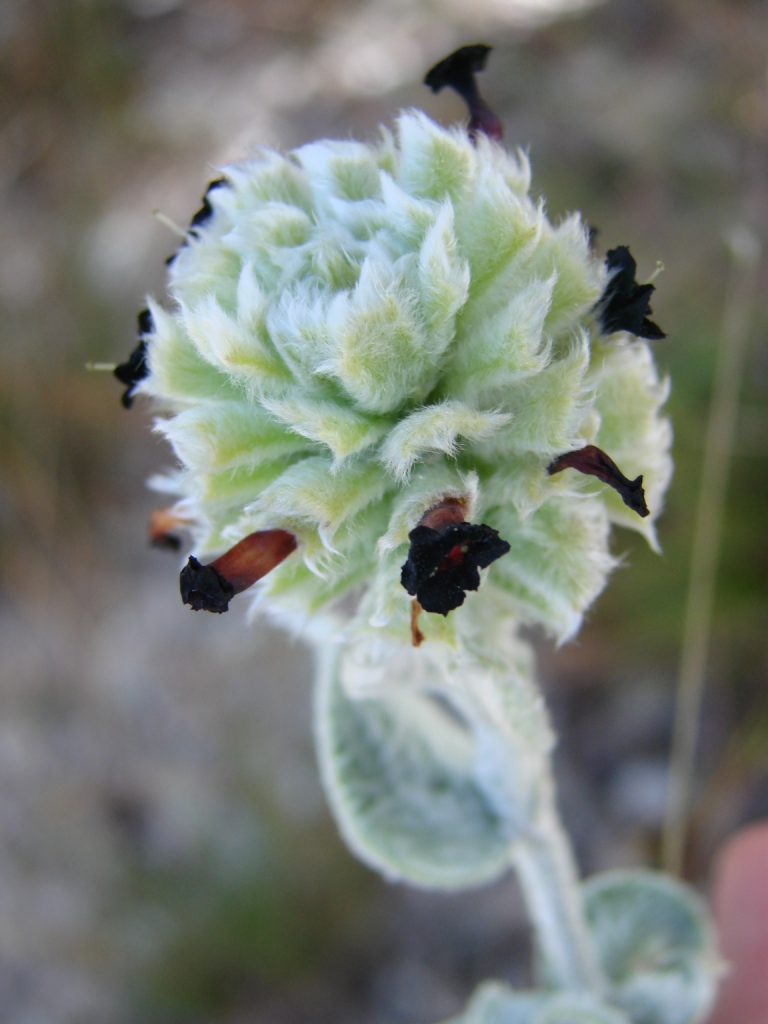
Stachytarpheta glauca flower

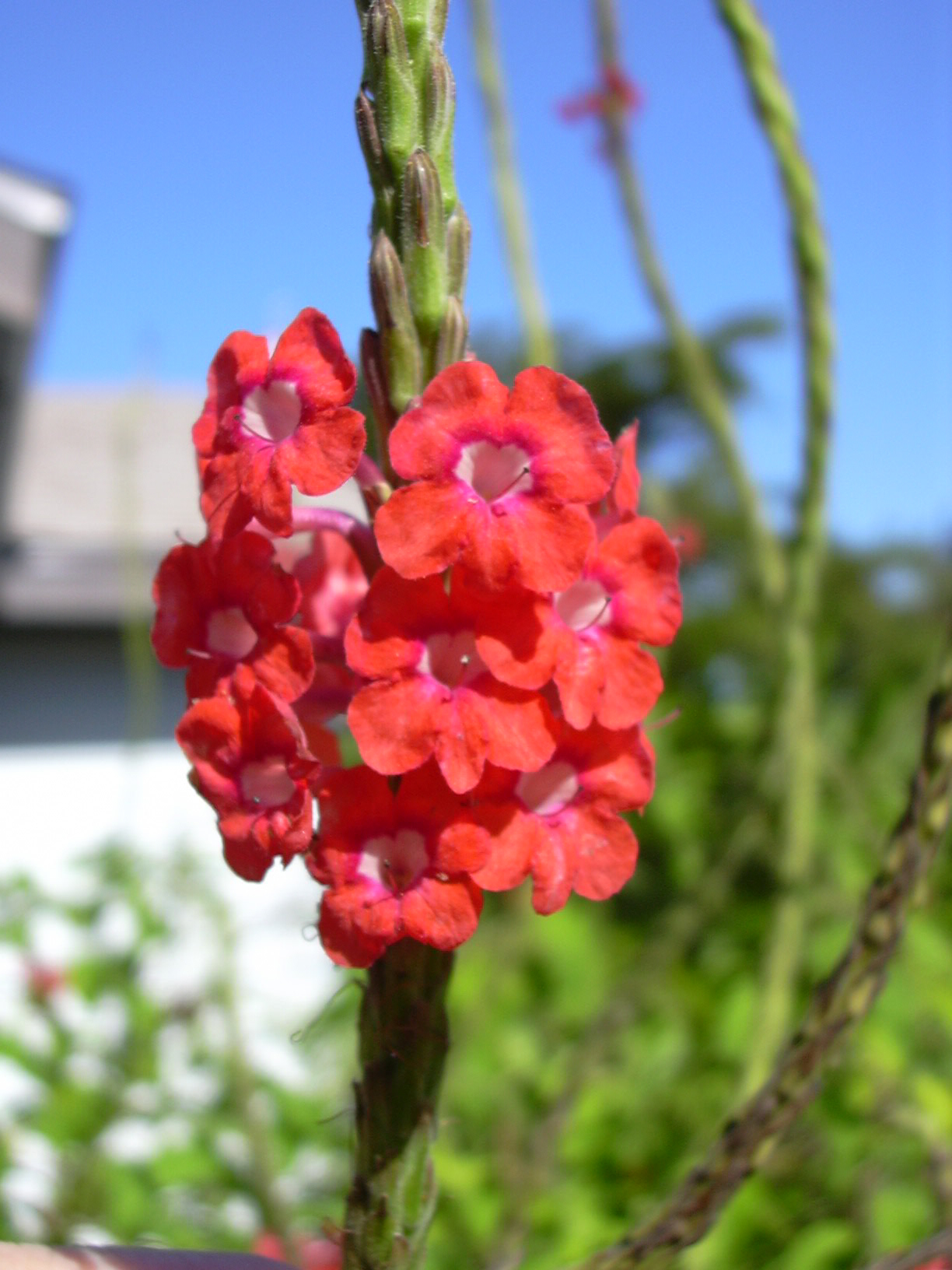
Stachytarpheta mutabilis flower

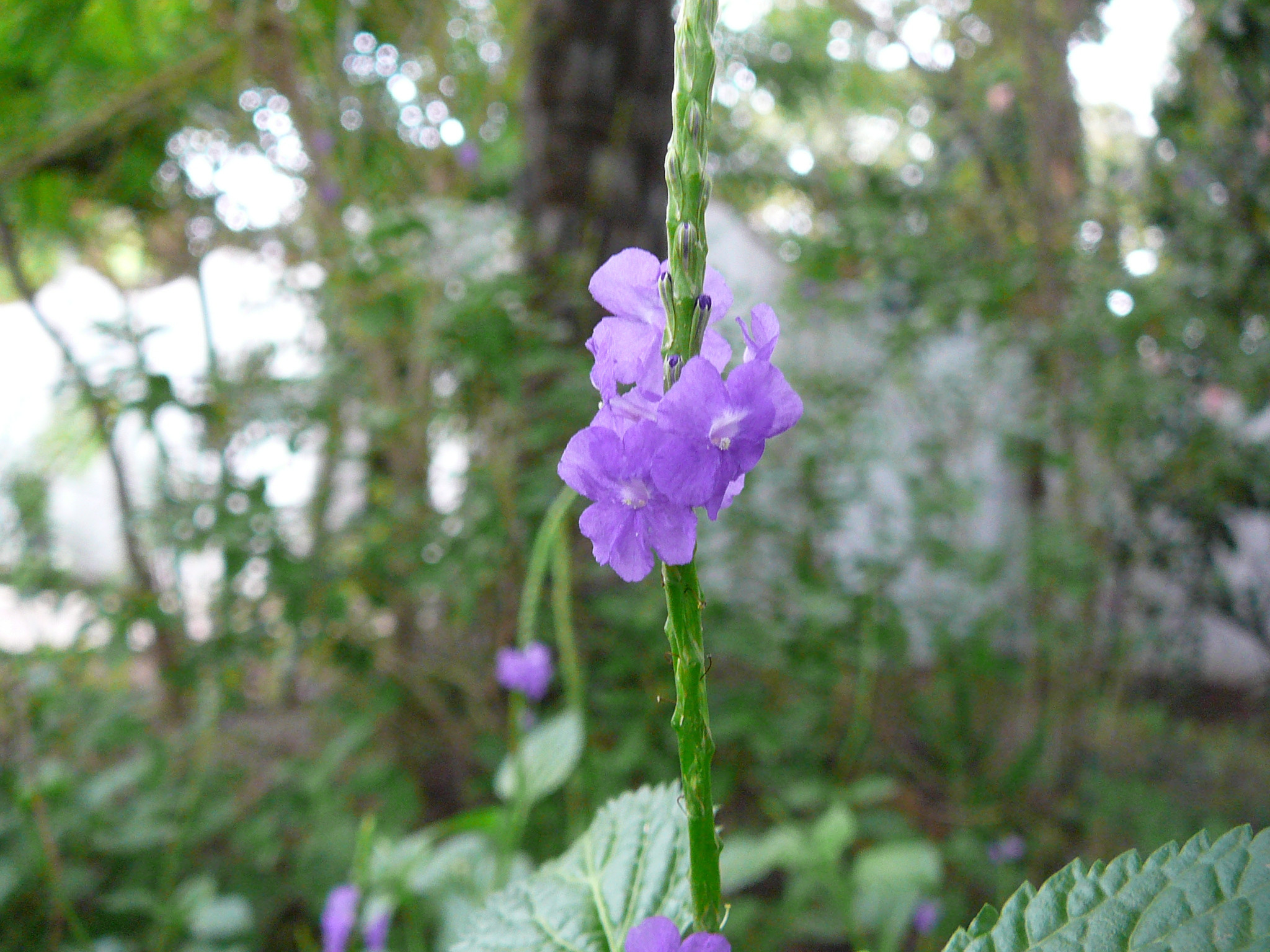
Stachytarpheta jamaicensis

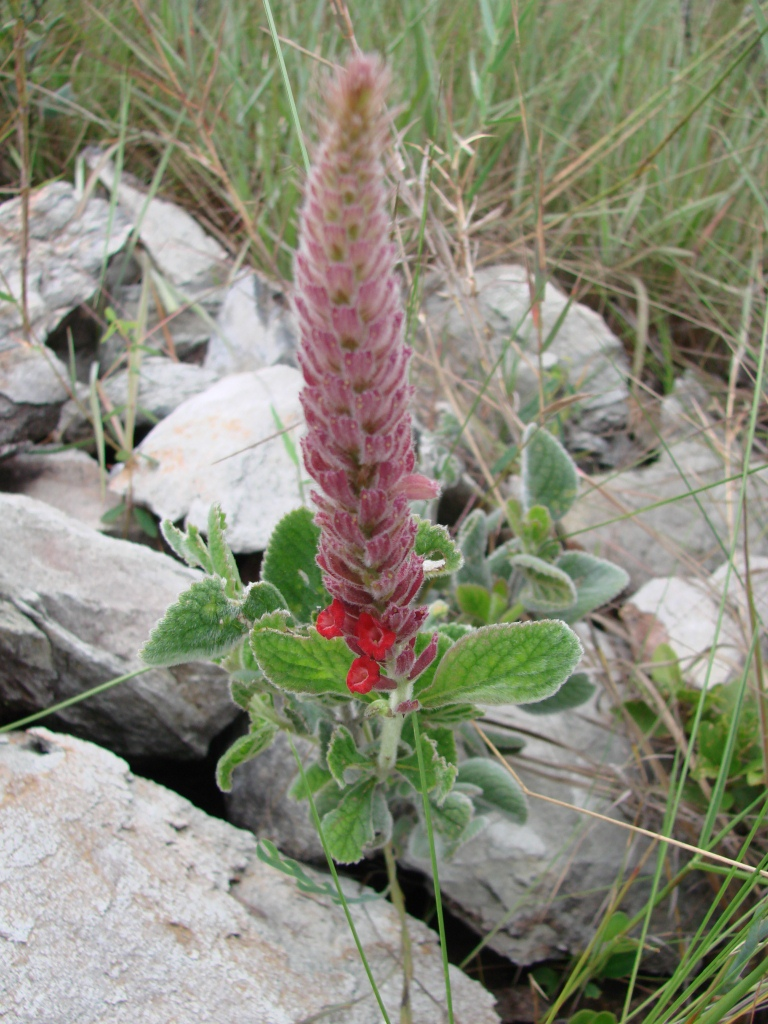
Stachytarpheta longispicata flower
