= Stachytarpheta steyermarkii =

Conservation status
- Vulnerable (IUCN 3.1)

Scientific classification
- Kingdom: Plantae
- Clade: Tracheophytes
- Clade: Angiosperms
- Clade: Eudicots
- Clade: Asterids
- Order: Lamiales
- Family: Verbenaceae
- Genus: Stachytarpheta
- Species: S. steyermarkii

Binomial name
- Stachytarpheta steyermarkii Moldenke

Species of flowering plant

Stachytarpheta steyermarkii is a species of plant in the family Verbenaceae. It is endemic to Ecuador. Its natural habitat is subtropical or tropical moist montane forests.
