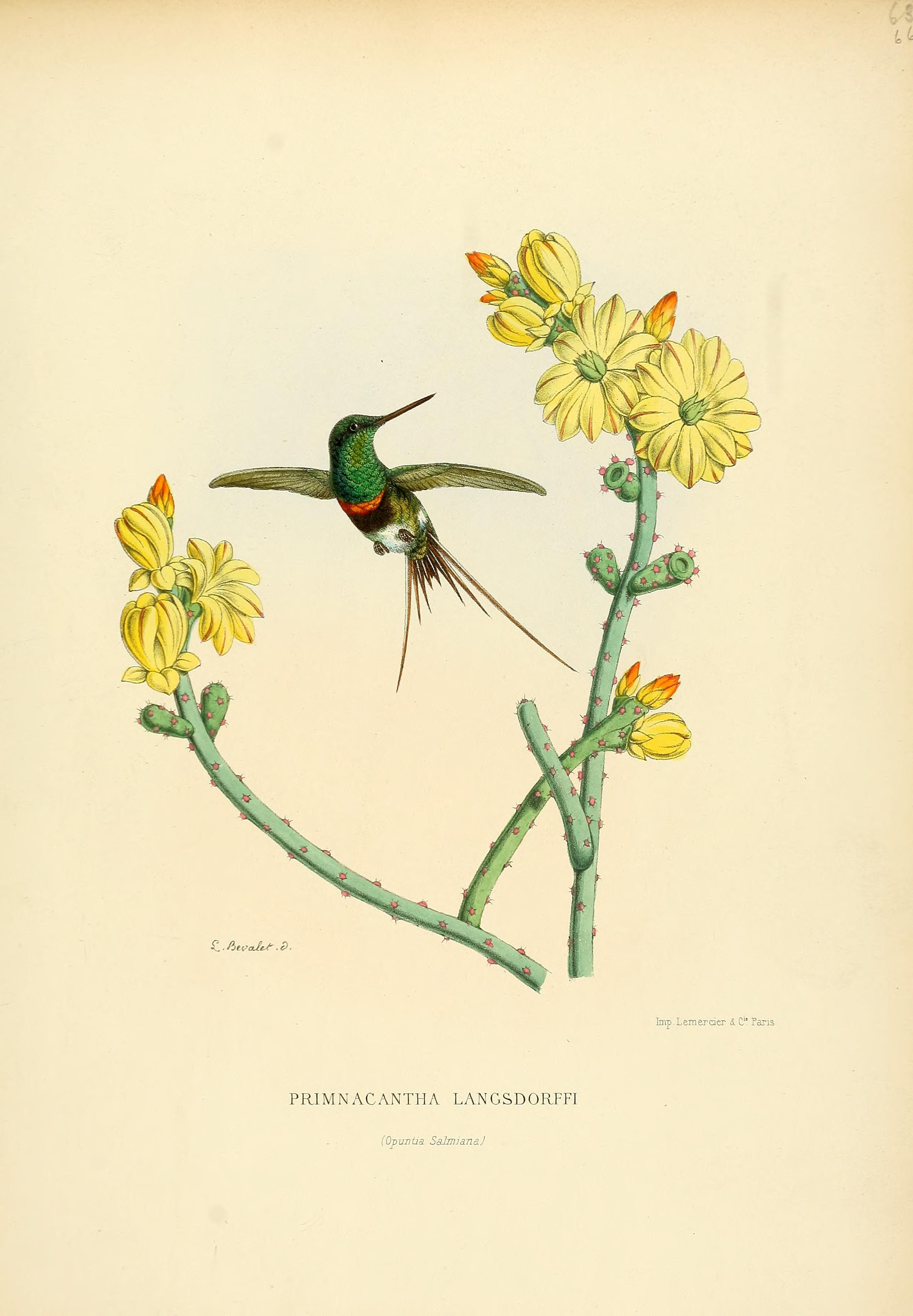
- Illustration of male

Conservation status
- Least Concern (IUCN 3.1)
- CITES Appendix II

Scientific classification
- Kingdom: Animalia
- Phylum: Chordata
- Class: Aves
- Order: Apodiformes
- Family: Trochilidae
- Genus: Discosura
- Species: D. langsdorffi

Binomial name
- Discosura langsdorffi (Temminck, 1821)

Synonyms
- Popelairia langsdorffi (Temminck, 1821)

= Black-bellied thorntail =

Species of hummingbird

The black-bellied thorntail (Discosura langsdorffi) is a species of hummingbird in the "coquettes", tribe Lesbiini of subfamily Lesbiinae. It is found in Bolivia, Brazil, Colombia, Ecuador, Peru, and Venezuela.

== Taxonomy and systematics ==
The black-bellied thorntail was briefly placed in genus Gouldomyia that was then merged into Popelairia. Since the late 1900s that genus has been merged into the present Discosura. Some authors have further merged Discosura into Lophornis but this treatment has not been widely accepted.

Two subspecies are recognized, the nominate D. l. langsdorffi (Temminck, 1821) and D. l. melanosternon (Gould, 1868).

== Description ==
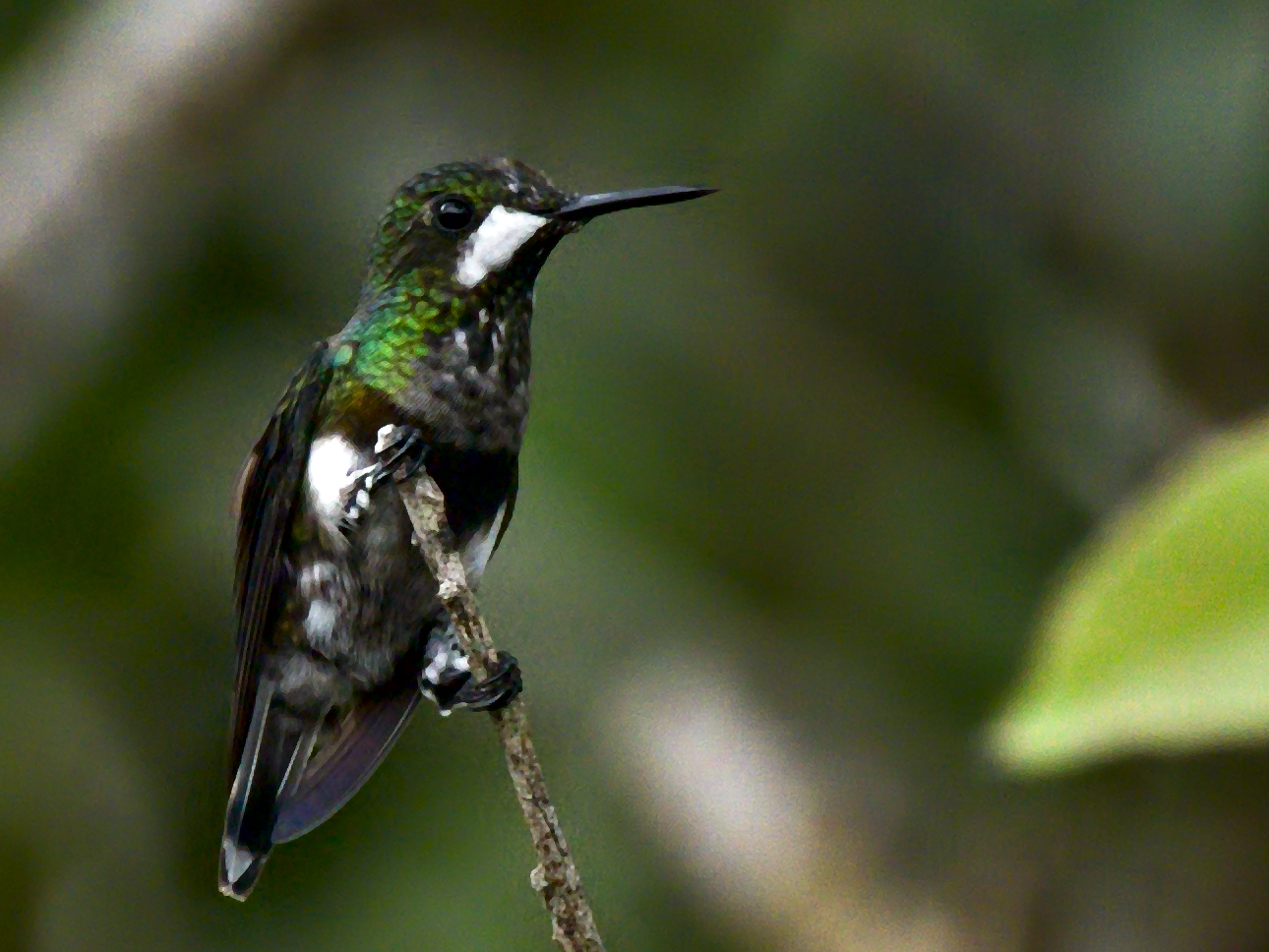
Female in Colombia

The black-bellied thorntail weighs about 3.2 g (0.11 oz). Males are 12 to 13.7 cm (4.7 to 5.4 in) long and females 7.4 to 7.6 cm (2.9 to 3.0 in). Adults of both sexes of the nominate subspecies have an iridescent emerald green crown and coppery green upperparts with a white band across the rump. The male's gorget is iridescent emerald green with a golden coppery band below it. Its flanks are bronzy green and the rest of the underparts black. The tail inner feathers of the tail are steely blue and the outer three pairs gray; all have white shafts. The tail is deeply forked, and the outer feathers are very narrow which give the species its common name. The female's throat is white with green and black spangles and it has a thin white streak on the cheek. Its breast is spangled green with a coppery lower border; the belly is black with a white patch on the flank. Its tail is short, only slightly forked, and steely blue with bronze at the base and white tips. Juveniles are similar to the adult female. Subspecies D. l. melanosternon is slightly smaller than the nominate; its crown is grass green, the breast more golden, and the rest of the underparts darker.

== Distribution and habitat ==
The nominate subspecies of black-bellied thorntail is restricted to coastal eastern Brazil from southeastern Bahia south through Espírito Santo into eastern Rio de Janeiro. D. l. melanosternon is found in Amazonia of southern Venezuela, southeastern Colombia, eastern Ecuador and Peru, far northern Bolivia, and western Brazil. It inhabits the edges and interior of humid lowland forest generally at elevations between 100 and 300 m (330 and 980 ft). In Amazonia it is mostly found in terra firme forest but also occurs in the transition zone between terra firme and várzea.

== Behavior ==
=== Movement ===
The black-bellied thorntail is believed to be sedentary.

=== Feeding ===
The black-bellied thorntail feeds on the nectar of a wide variety of flowering trees and other plants. It mostly forages from the middle level of the forest to the canopy. It also feeds on arthropods, and a female has been observed apparently picking insects from a spider web.

=== Breeding ===
The black-bellied thorntail breeds between November and February in eastern Brazil and between September and March in the Amazonian part of its range. It makes a cup nest of soft plant down decorated with lichen on the outside. It typically places it on a horizontal branch about 10 to 35 m (33 to 110 ft) above the ground. The female incubates the clutch of two eggs for about 13 days; fledging is about 20 days after hatch.

=== Vocal and non-vocal sounds ===
The black-bellied thorntail is mostly silent. When feeding it gives a "short 'tsip' or 'chip'." Its wings make a bee-like humming when hovering.

== Status ==
The black-bellied thorntail has a large distribution and is assessed by the IUCN as being of Least Concern, meaning that overall it is not considered threatened. Its population size is not known and is believed to be decreasing. It is usually considered rare but might be under-counted due to its usually staying high in the forest. "[Its habitat is] under severe threat of deforestation, and [the] species does not seem to accept man-made habitats." It does occur in some protected areas.
