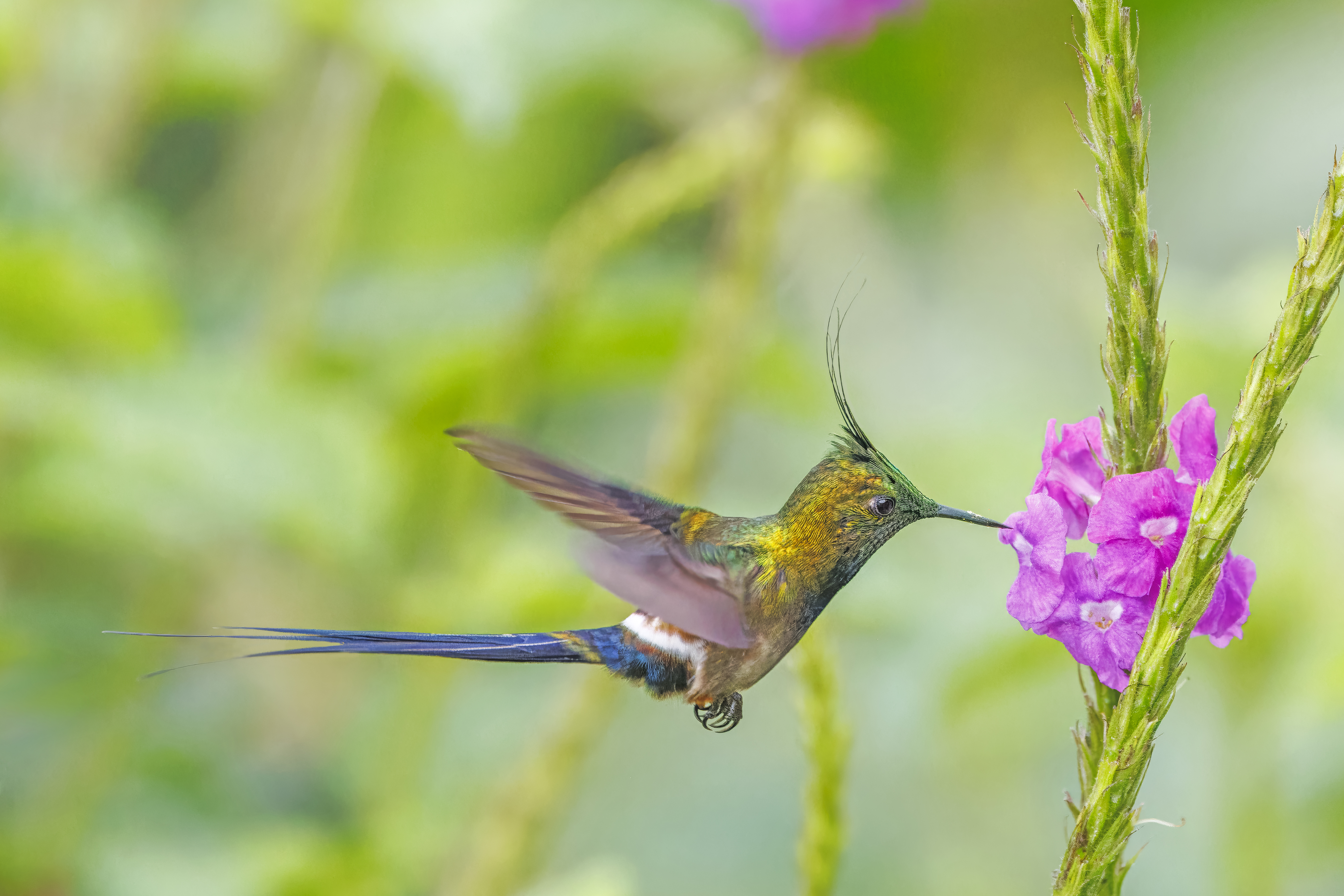
- Male
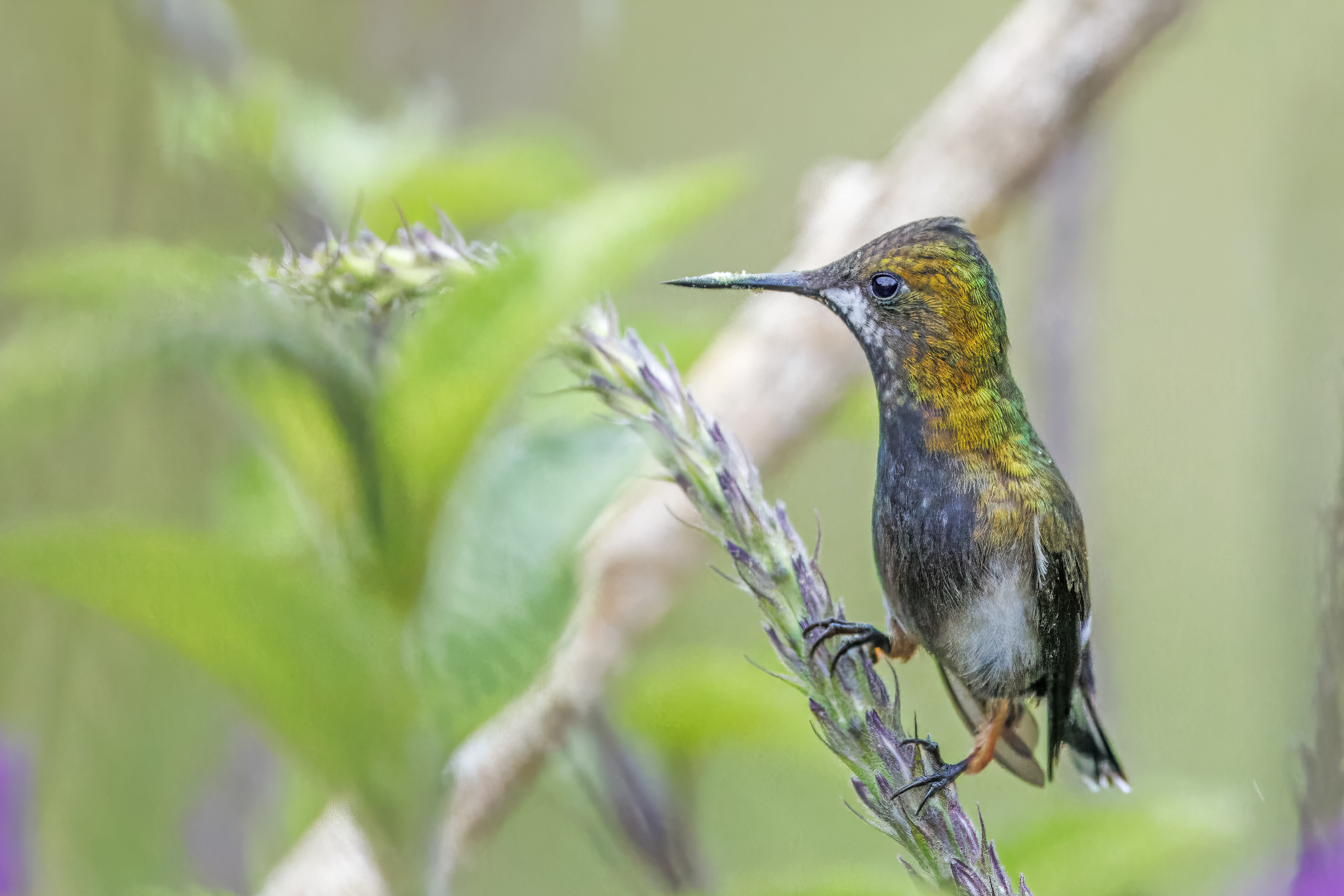
- Female both in Ecuador

Conservation status
- Least Concern (IUCN 3.1)
- CITES Appendix II (CITES)

Scientific classification
- Kingdom: Animalia
- Phylum: Chordata
- Class: Aves
- Clade: Strisores
- Order: Apodiformes
- Family: Trochilidae
- Genus: Discosura
- Species: D. popelairii

Binomial name
- Discosura popelairii (Du Bus de Gisignies, 1846)

Synonyms
- Popelairia popelairii

= Wire-crested thorntail =

Species of hummingbird

The wire-crested thorntail (Discosura popelairii) is a hummingbird in the "coquettes", tribe Lesbiini of subfamily Lesbiinae. It is found in humid forests in the Andean foothills of Colombia, Ecuador, Peru, and possibly Bolivia.

== Taxonomy and systematics ==
The wire-crested thorntail and three other species were at one time placed in genus Popelairia but since the late 1900s that genus has been merged into the present Discosura. Some authors have further merged Discosura into Lophornis but this treatment has not been widely accepted. The species is monotypic.

== Description ==
The wire-crested thorntail is one of the smallest birds on Earth, with a mature weight of about 2.5 g (0.088 oz). Males are about 11.4 cm (4.5 in) long, including tail extension, and females about 7.5 to 8.2 cm (3.0 to 3.2 in). Adults of both sexes have coppery green upperparts with a white band across the rump. Males have a glittering green crown with a thin hair-like crest. Its gorget is iridescent green, the flanks brownish with a white patch, and the rest of the underparts black. The tail is steely blue with white feather shafts, deeply forked, and the outer feathers are very narrow which with the crest give the species its common name. The female does not have the crest. It has a broad white streak on the cheek. Its underparts are black with a white patch on the flank. Its tail is short, only slightly forked, and bluish black with white tips. Juveniles are similar to the adult female.

== Distribution and habitat ==
The wire-crested thorntail is found in the Andean foothills from eastern Colombia's Meta Department through eastern Ecuador into eastern Peru as far south as the Department of Puno. In addition, there is at least one sight record in Bolivia. It inhabits the edges and interior of humid forest at elevations between 500 and 1,500 m (1,600 and 4,900 ft).

== Behavior ==
=== Movement ===
The wire-crested thorntail is believed to be sedentary.

=== Feeding ===
The wire-crested thorntail feeds on nectar, primarily in the forest canopy, and favoring the flowers of Inga trees. It also eats small arthropods.

=== Breeding ===
Almost nothing is known about the wire-crested thorntail's breeding phenology. The one nest discovered was on a branch 8 m (26 ft) above the ground.

=== Vocalization ===
The only wire-crested thorntail vocalization that has been described is a "quiet, somewhat liquid 'tew'."

== Status ==
The IUCN assesses the wire-crested thorntail as being of Least Concern because of its wide range, which also includes several protected areas. Its population size and trend are not known. Its habitat is "under severe threat of destruction."
