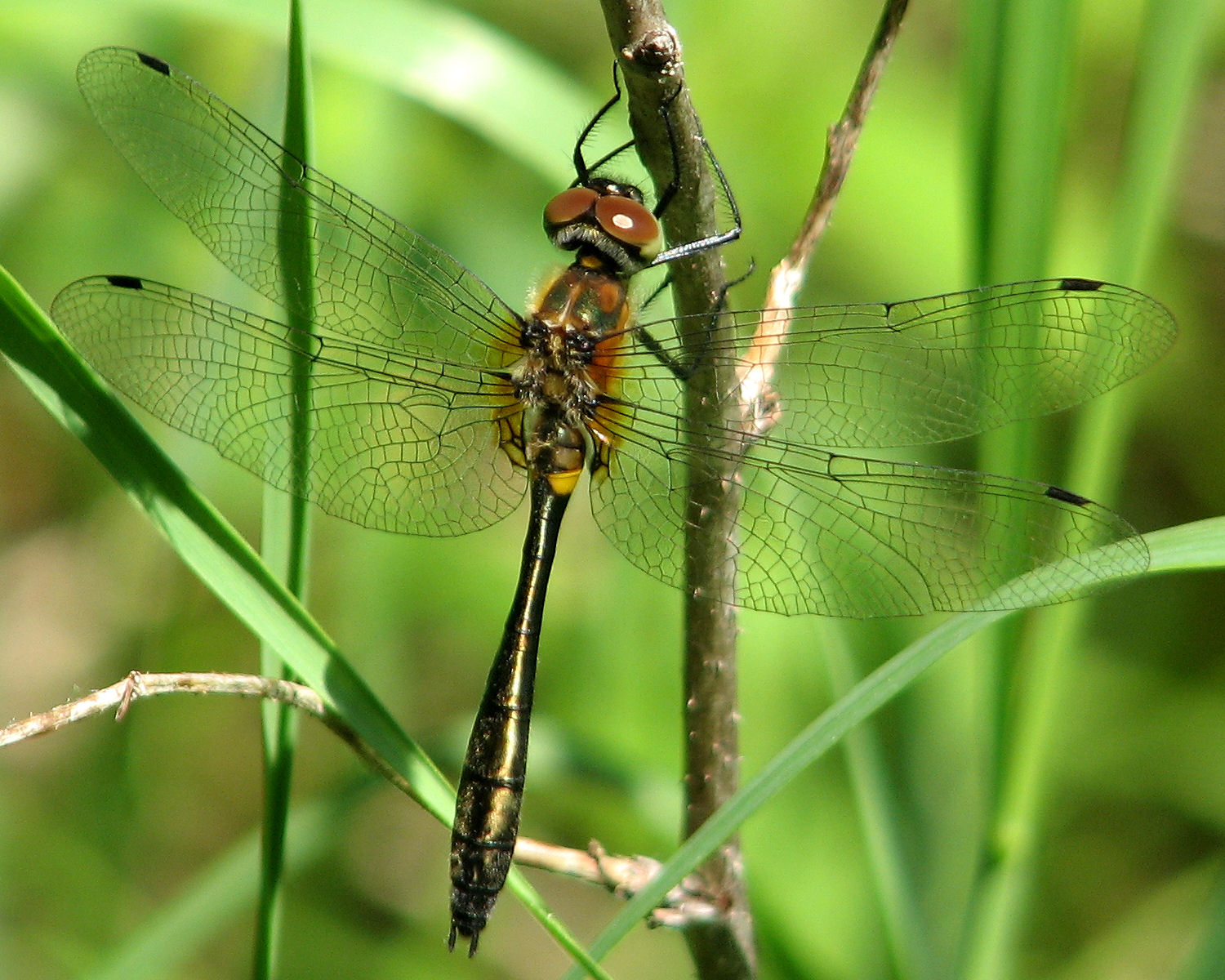
- Racket-tailed emerald (Dorocordulia libera)

Scientific classification
- Kingdom: Animalia
- Phylum: Arthropoda
- Class: Insecta
- Order: Odonata
- Infraorder: Anisoptera
- Family: Corduliidae
- Subfamily: Corduliinae
- Genus: Dorocordulia; Needham, 1901

= Dorocordulia =

Genus of dragonflies

Dorocordulia, commonly called little emeralds or little barlasses, is a genus of dragonfly in the family Corduliidae found in North America.

== Species ==
Image	Scientific name	Common name	Distribution
	Dorocordulia lepida (Hagen in Selys, 1871)	petite emerald	North America
	Dorocordulia libera (Selys, 1871)	racket-tailed emerald	North America
