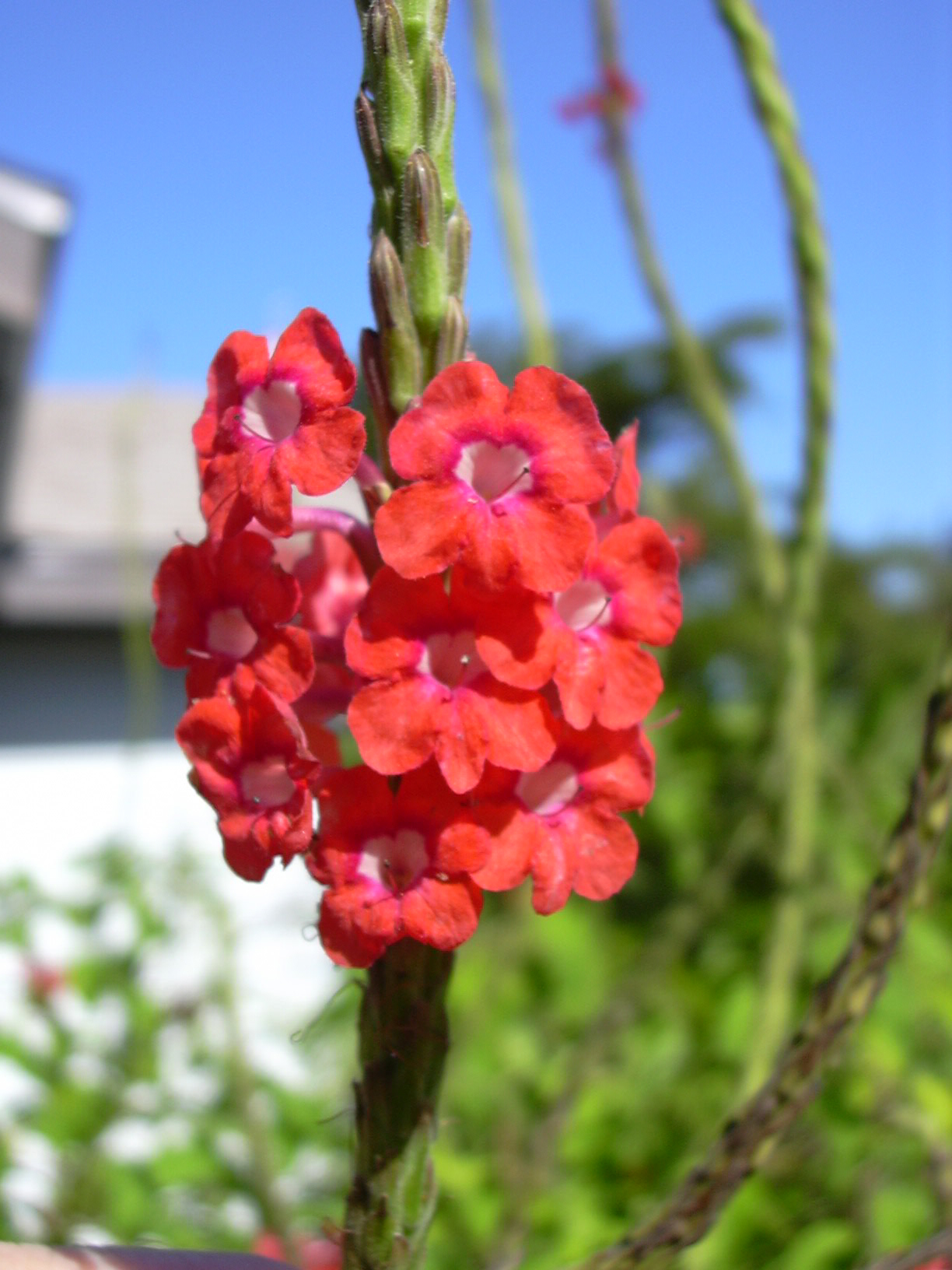

Scientific classification
- Kingdom: Plantae
- Clade: Tracheophytes
- Clade: Angiosperms
- Clade: Eudicots
- Clade: Asterids
- Order: Lamiales
- Family: Verbenaceae
- Genus: Stachytarpheta
- Species: S. mutabilis

Binomial name
- Stachytarpheta mutabilis (Jacq.) Vahl

Synonyms
- Cymburus mutabilis (Jacq.) Salisb.; Stachytarpheta purpurea Greenm.; Stachytarpheta zuccagni Roem. & Schult.; Valerianoides mutabilis (Jacq.) Kuntze; Verbena mutabilis Jacq.; Zappania mutabilis (Jacq.) Lam.

= Stachytarpheta mutabilis =

Species of flowering plant

Stachytarpheta mutabilis is a species of flowering plant in the verbena family known by the common names changeable velvetberry, coral porterweed, pink snakeweed, red snakeweed, and pink rat tail. It is native to Mexico, the Caribbean, and South America. It can be found in many other places as an introduced species. It is cultivated as an ornamental plant.

== Description ==
This species is a perennial herb or subshrub generally growing 10 to 20 centimeters tall, sometimes reaching half a meter. The hairy stems have oppositely arranged leaves. The leaf blades are leathery in texture and oblong or lance-shaped. They measure up to 12 centimeters long. The inflorescence is a narrow spike up to 60 centimeters long. The flowers come in many shades of red and pink, or violet (Stachytarpheta mutabilis var. violacea).

This species sometimes escapes cultivation and becomes established in the wild. It can be weedy, growing in disturbed habitat such as pastures and roadsides.

This plant is an introduced invasive species in Fiji, Hawaii, Queensland, and Singapore.

The flowers are attractive to a variety of insects. The butterflies Ornithoptera priamus poseidon and Papilio ulysses have been observed foraging on the plant, as has the bee Amegilla sapiens. Parts of the plant contain the iridoid glycoside ipolamiide, which inhibits insect predation on the plant.
