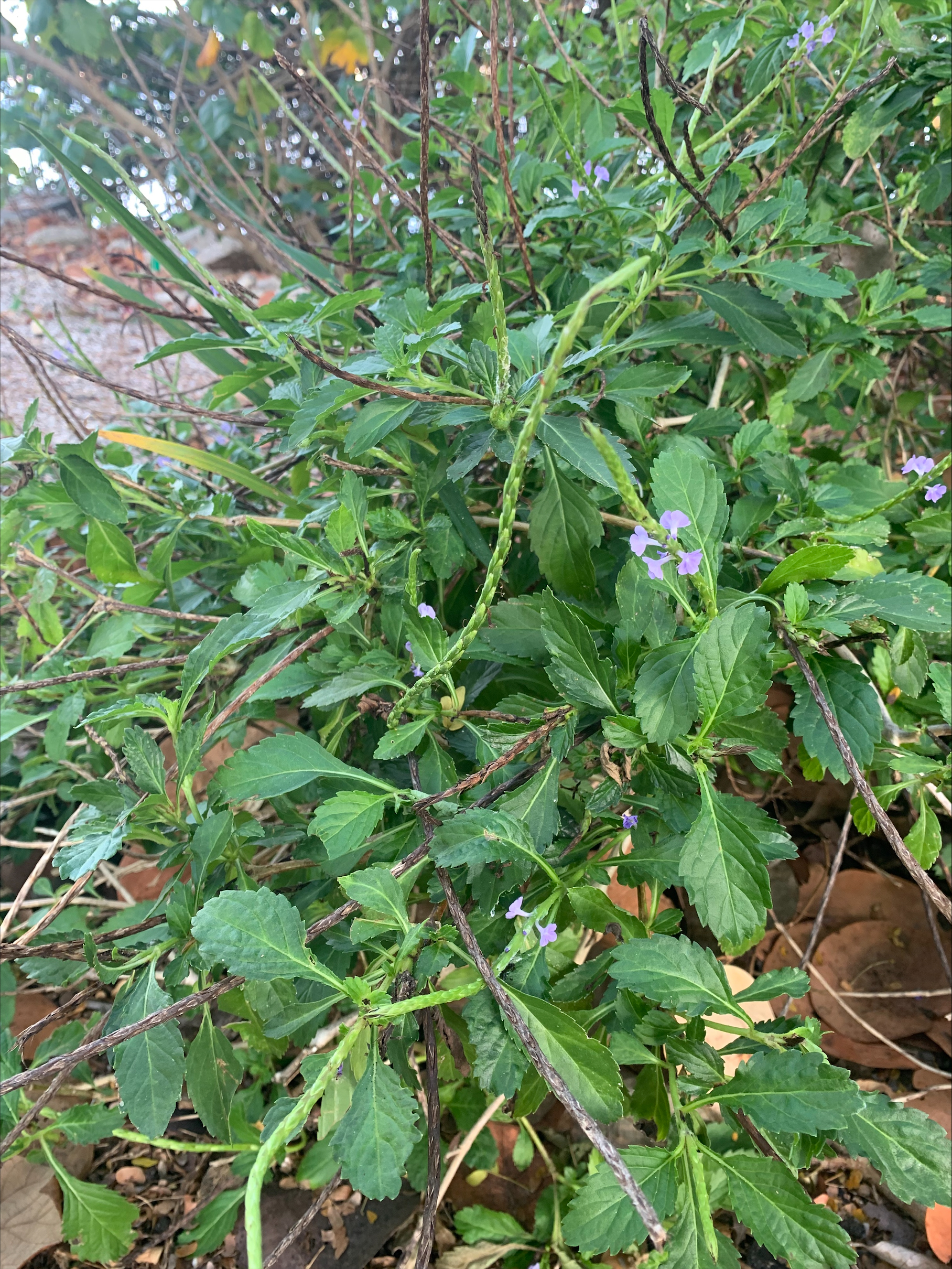

Conservation status
- Least Concern (IUCN 3.1)

Scientific classification
- Kingdom: Plantae
- Clade: Tracheophytes
- Clade: Angiosperms
- Clade: Eudicots
- Clade: Asterids
- Order: Lamiales
- Family: Verbenaceae
- Genus: Stachytarpheta
- Species: S. jamaicensis

Binomial name
- Stachytarpheta jamaicensis (L.) Vahl

Synonyms
- Abena jamaicensis (L.) Hitchc.; Stachytarpheta bogoriensis Zoll. & Moritzi; Stachytarpheta pilosiuscula Kunth; Valerianoides jamaicense (L.) Kuntze; Valerianoides jamaicense (L.) Medik.; Valerianoides jamaicensis (L.) Medik.; Verbena americana Mill.; Verbena jamaicensis L.; Verbena pilosiuscula (Kunth) Endl.; Vermicularia decurrens Moench nom. illeg.; Zappania jamaicensis (L.) Lam.

= Stachytarpheta jamaicensis =

Species of flowering plant

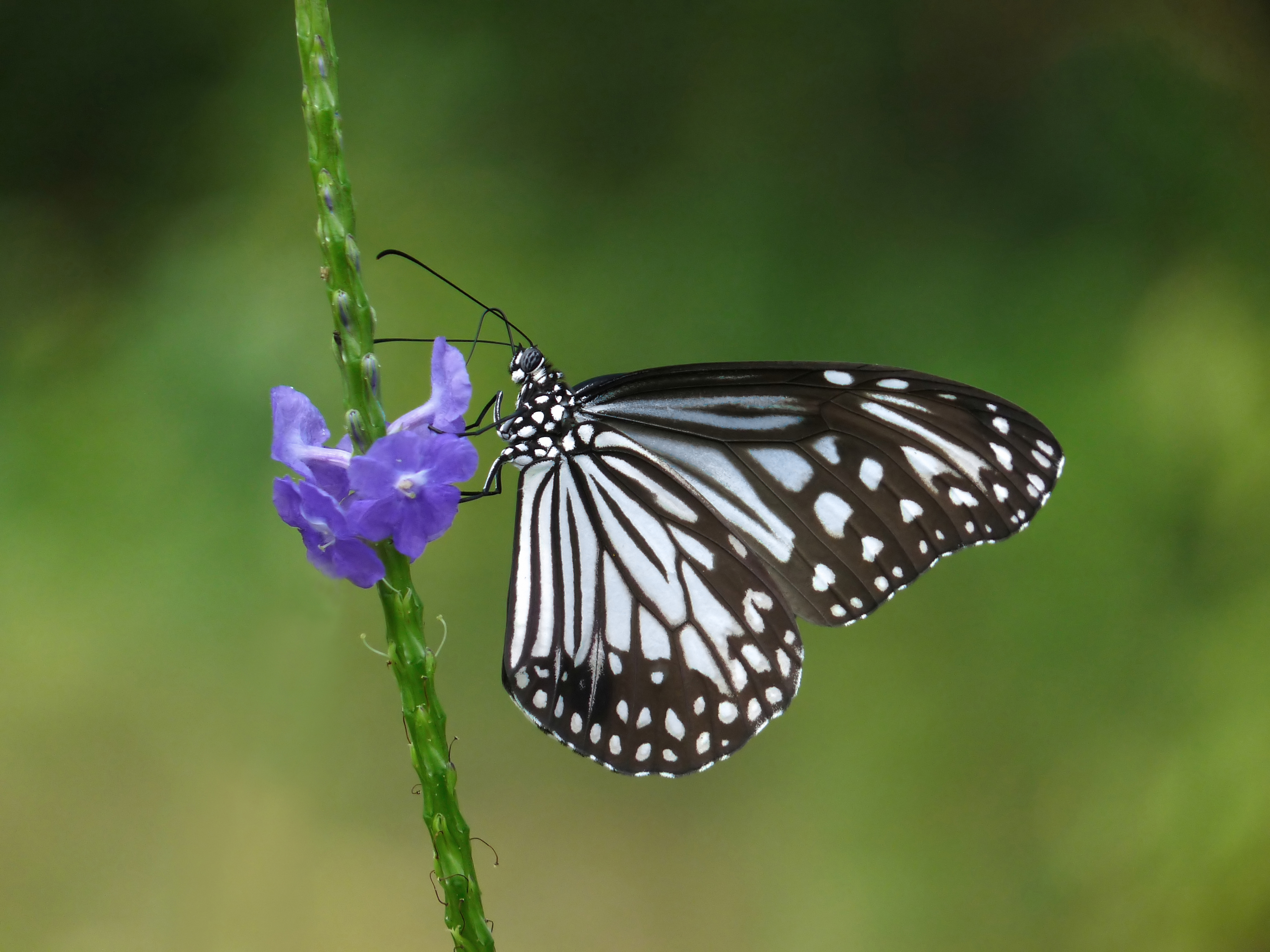
Parantica aglea on Stachytarpheta jamaicensis

Stachytarpheta jamaicensis is a species of plant in the family Verbenaceae, native throughout the Caribbean, including Florida. It has many common names including blue porterweed, blue snake weed, bastard vervain, Brazilian tea, Jamaica vervain, light-blue snakeweed, and, in St. Croix, worryvine.^{source?} It usually is found along country roadsides, and it also grows well as a ruderal plant on disturbed terrain.

A similar plant, Stachytarpheta cayennensis, which is an invasive species in Florida, is sometimes mistaken for S. jamaicensis.

It is unclear whether S. indica is a separate species.

== Description ==
S. jamaicensis is a sprawling shrub. Stems are green to purple in color. Flowers are blue or purple. S. jamaicensis' leaves are oppositely arranged, serrated, and ovate in shape.

== Habitat ==
This species grows on sand dunes, within pine rocklands, and at disturbed sites. It has been observed growing in sandy, loamy, and clay soils.

== Medicinal Uses ==
The fresh leaves are consumed in bush tea as a "cooling" tonic and blood cleanser, to treat "asthma" and "ulcerated stomachs".

Tea brewed from this species has been shown to cause a dose-dependent "fall in [the] blood pressure" of normal rabbits. However, the tea has also been observed to cause a "mild non-dose dependent systematic toxicity" in various tissues throughout the body, "such as congestion, fatty changes, and necrosis in liver, blood vessels, kidney, lung and testis, but the brain, eyes, intestines and heart were essentially normal."

== Gallery ==
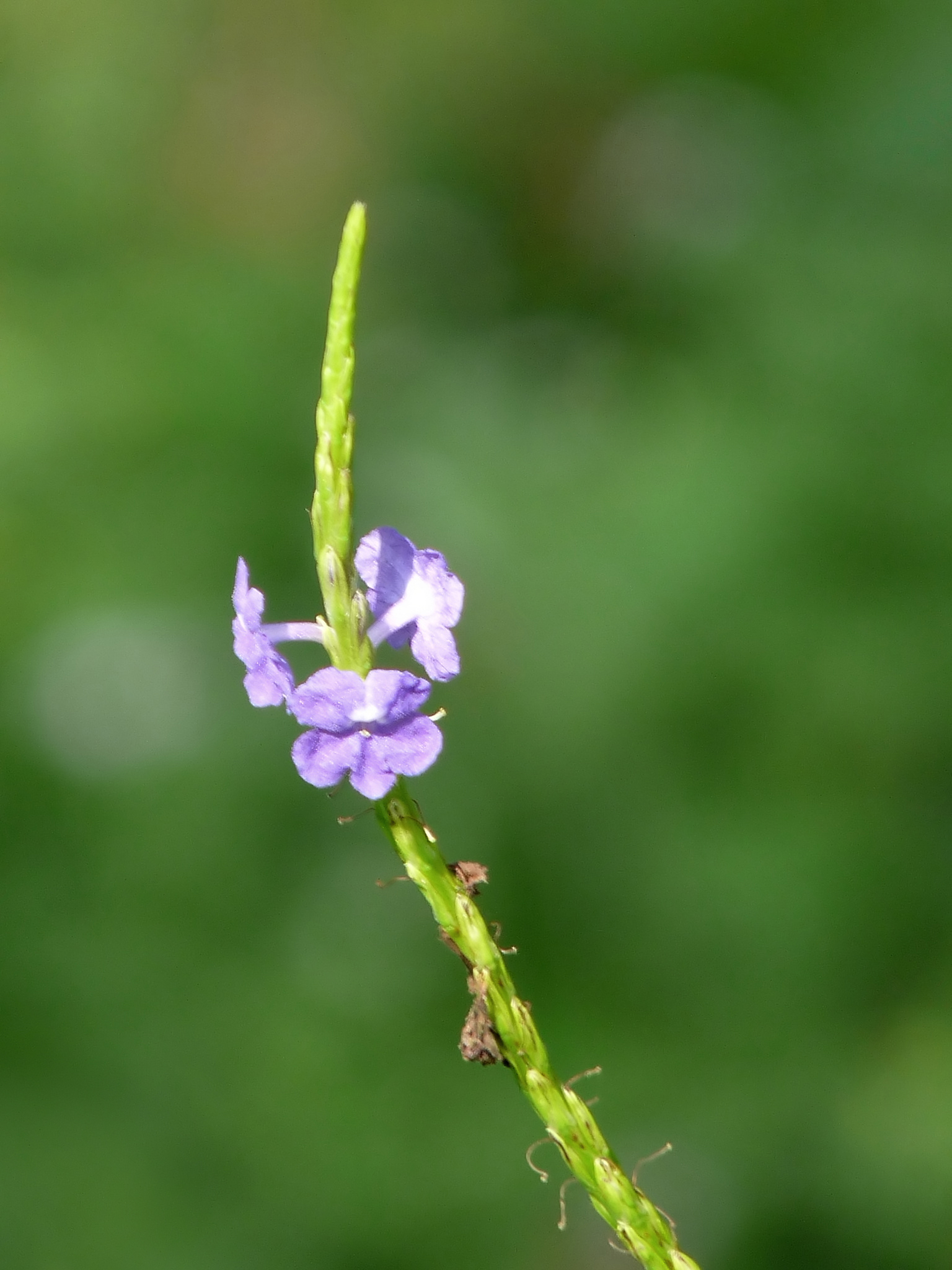
in Aanakkulam

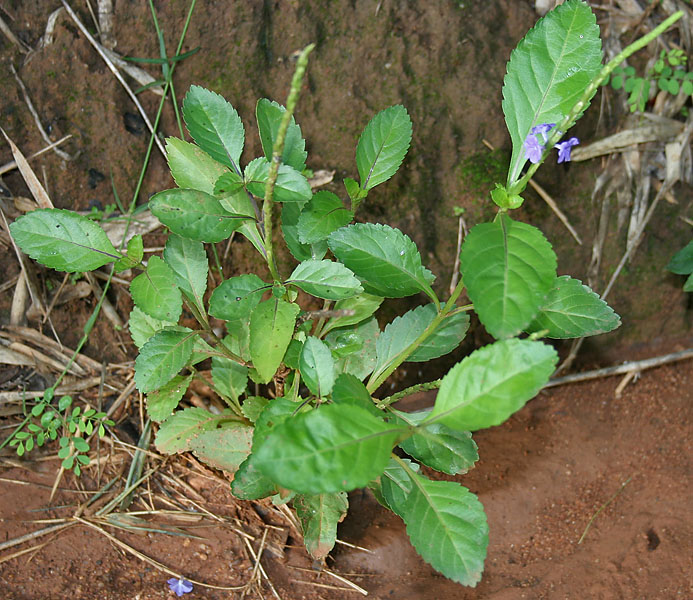
in Talakona forest, in Chittoor District of Andhra Pradesh, India

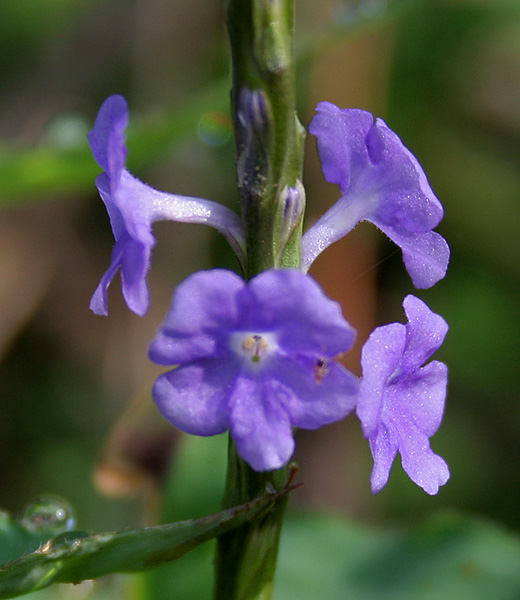
In Talakona forest

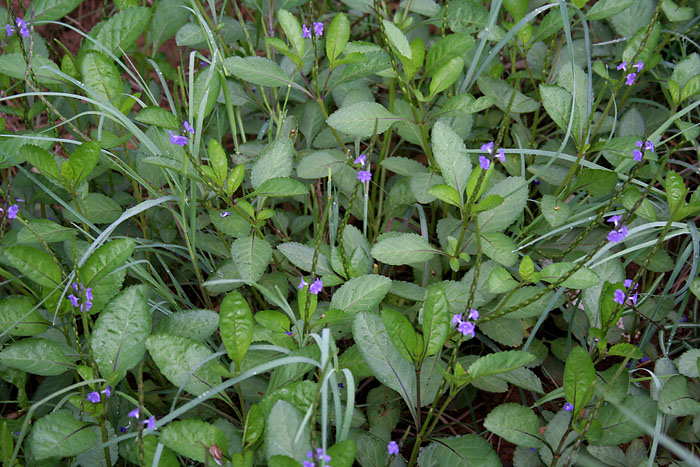
In Talakona forest

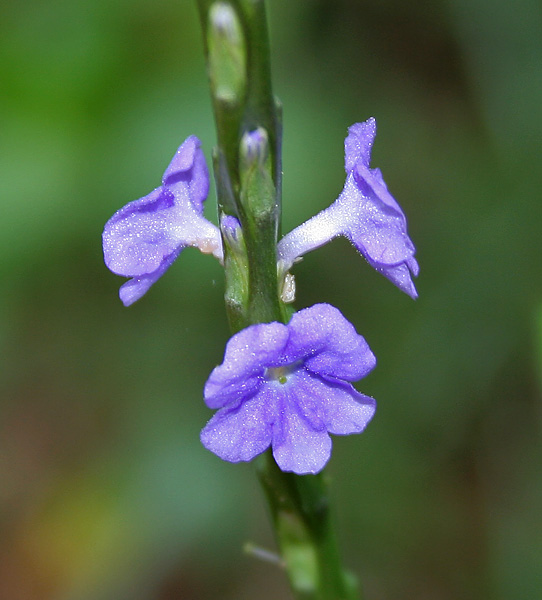
In Talakona forest
