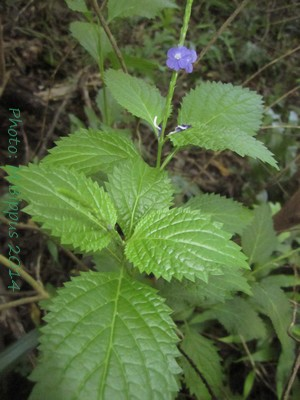

Scientific classification
- Kingdom: Plantae
- Clade: Tracheophytes
- Clade: Angiosperms
- Clade: Eudicots
- Clade: Asterids
- Order: Lamiales
- Family: Verbenaceae
- Genus: Stachytarpheta
- Species: S. urticifolia

Binomial name
- Stachytarpheta urticifolia Sims

Synonyms
- Cymburus urticifolius Salisb.; Verbena salisburii Endl.; Zappania urticifolia (Salisb.) Poir.

= Stachytarpheta urticifolia =

Species of flowering plant

Stachytarpheta urticifolia, the nettleleaf velvetberry or dark blue snakeweed, is a species of lavender plant in the verbena family. In some countries it is considered as an invasive weed.
