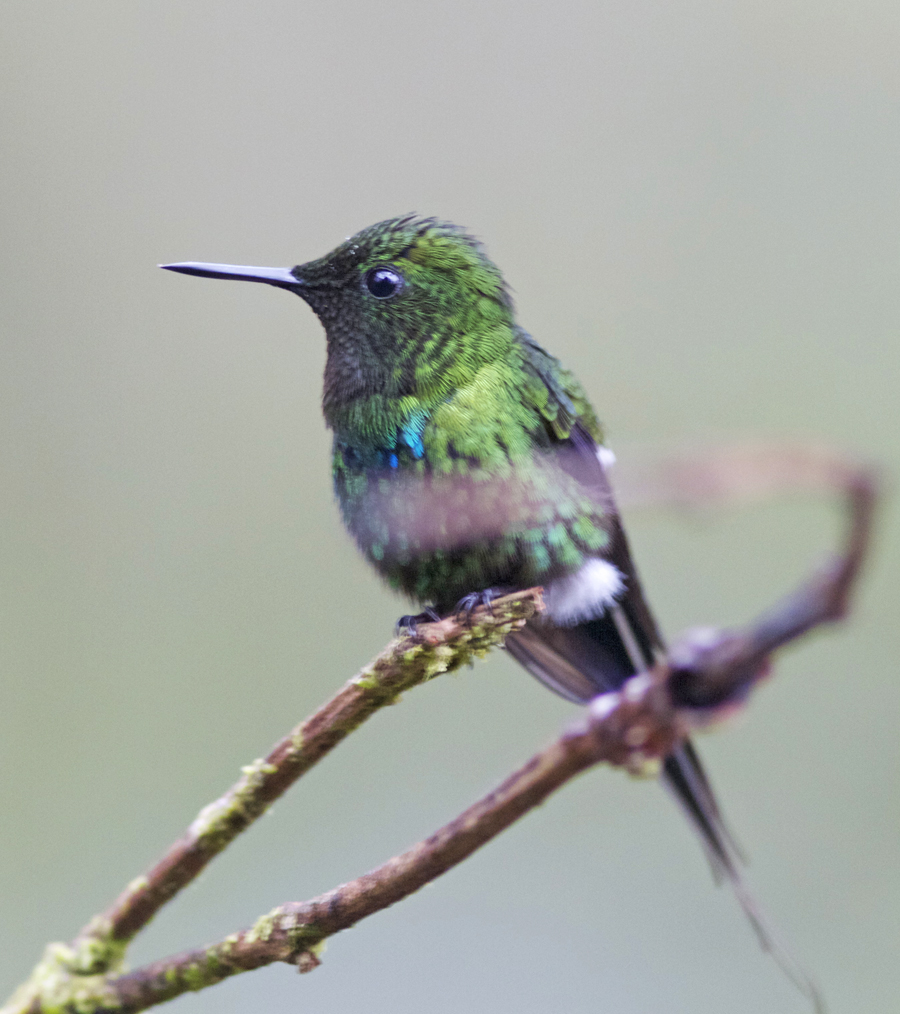
- Male, Milpe Bird Sanctuary, NW Ecuador
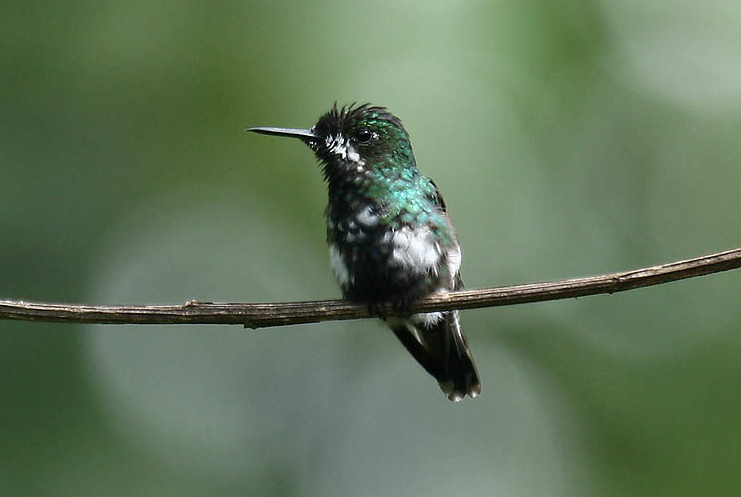
- Female

Conservation status
- Least Concern (IUCN 3.1)
- CITES Appendix II

Scientific classification
- Kingdom: Animalia
- Phylum: Chordata
- Class: Aves
- Order: Apodiformes
- Family: Trochilidae
- Genus: Discosura
- Species: D. conversii

Binomial name
- Discosura conversii (Bourcier & Mulsant, 1846)

Synonyms
- Popelairia conversii

= Green thorntail =

Species of hummingbird

The green thorntail (Discosura conversii) is a small hummingbird in the "coquettes", tribe Lesbiini of subfamily Lesbiinae. It is found in Colombia, Costa Rica, Ecuador, and Panama.

== Taxonomy and systematics ==
The green thorntail and three other species were at one time placed in genus Popelairia but since the late 1900s that genus has been merged into the present Discosura. Some authors have further merged Discosura into Lophornis but this treatment has not been widely accepted. Though early authors proposed two subspecies for the green thorntail, current taxonomies treat it as monotypic.

== Description ==
Male green thorntails are about 9.5 to 10.2 cm (3.7 to 4.0 in) long and females about 6.6 to 7.5 cm (2.6 to 3.0 in). Five individuals whose sex was not recorded had an average weight of 3.0 g (0.11 oz). The adult male has a dark green crown and a lighter more metallic green back. The coppery bronze rump has bluish black inclusions and a white band across it. The bluish black tail is deeply forked and the outer feathers are very narrow, giving the species its common name. The throat is bright metallic green and the breast and belly mostly darker green with the center of the breast being metallic greenish blue. The adult female's upperparts are like the male's but for a darker rump. Its tail is notched but not elongated. All but the outermost pair of tail feathers are bluish black with dark green bases; the outmost have white bases, a blue-black middle, and white tips. Their face has a broad white cheek patch. The chin is dull black with white spots, the flanks dull green with a white spot, and the breast and belly dull black. Juveniles are like the adults but with a grayish white chin.

== Distribution and habitat ==
The green thorntail is found on the Caribbean slope in Costa Rica and the Pacific slopes of Panama, Colombia, and Ecuador almost to the Peruvian border. It is thought to also occur on the Caribbean side of eastern Panama. It is primarily a forest canopy species, inhabiting the upper levels of the interior and edges of humid montane forest and lowland evergreen forest. It also occurs at flowering trees in clearings. In elevation it mostly ranges from 700 to 1,400 m (2,300 to 4,600 ft) in Costa Rica, 600 to 1,200 m (2,000 to 3,900 ft) in Panama, from near sea level to 1,000 m (3,300 ft) in Colombia, and at 300 to 1,000 m (980 to 3,300 ft) in Ecuador.

== Behavior ==
=== Movement ===
The green thorntail is generally resident throughout its range but it also tends to move to its lower elevations during the wet season.

=== Feeding ===
The green thorntail forages for nectar mostly at the tops of flowering trees but also from epiphytes and shrubs. It appears to favor legumes. It nectars while hovering with its tail cocked at nearly a right angle to its body. Its diet also includes small arthropods such as flies, wasps, and spiders that it captures by hawking from a perch and gleans from the underside of leaves while hovering.

=== Breeding ===
Breeding male green thorntails perch on high bare twigs and sometimes give a dive display. The species' breeding season appears to vary across its range but are not well defined. It is thought to span from November to April in Costa Rica, and displays have been noted in Colombia in June. All hummingbirds lay two white eggs that are incubated by the female alone, but no details of the species' breeding phenology are known and the nest has not been described.

=== Vocalization ===
The green thorntail is usually silent, but makes "soft, squeaky chipping in interactions".

== Status ==
The IUCN has assessed the green thorntail as being of Least Concern though its population size is not known and is believed to be decreasing. It is judged to be rare and local in Panama, uncommon to common in Colombia, and uncommon in Costa Rica and Ecuador. It is "vulnerable to widespread habitat loss or degradation, but otherwise human activity probably has little short term effect on this species."

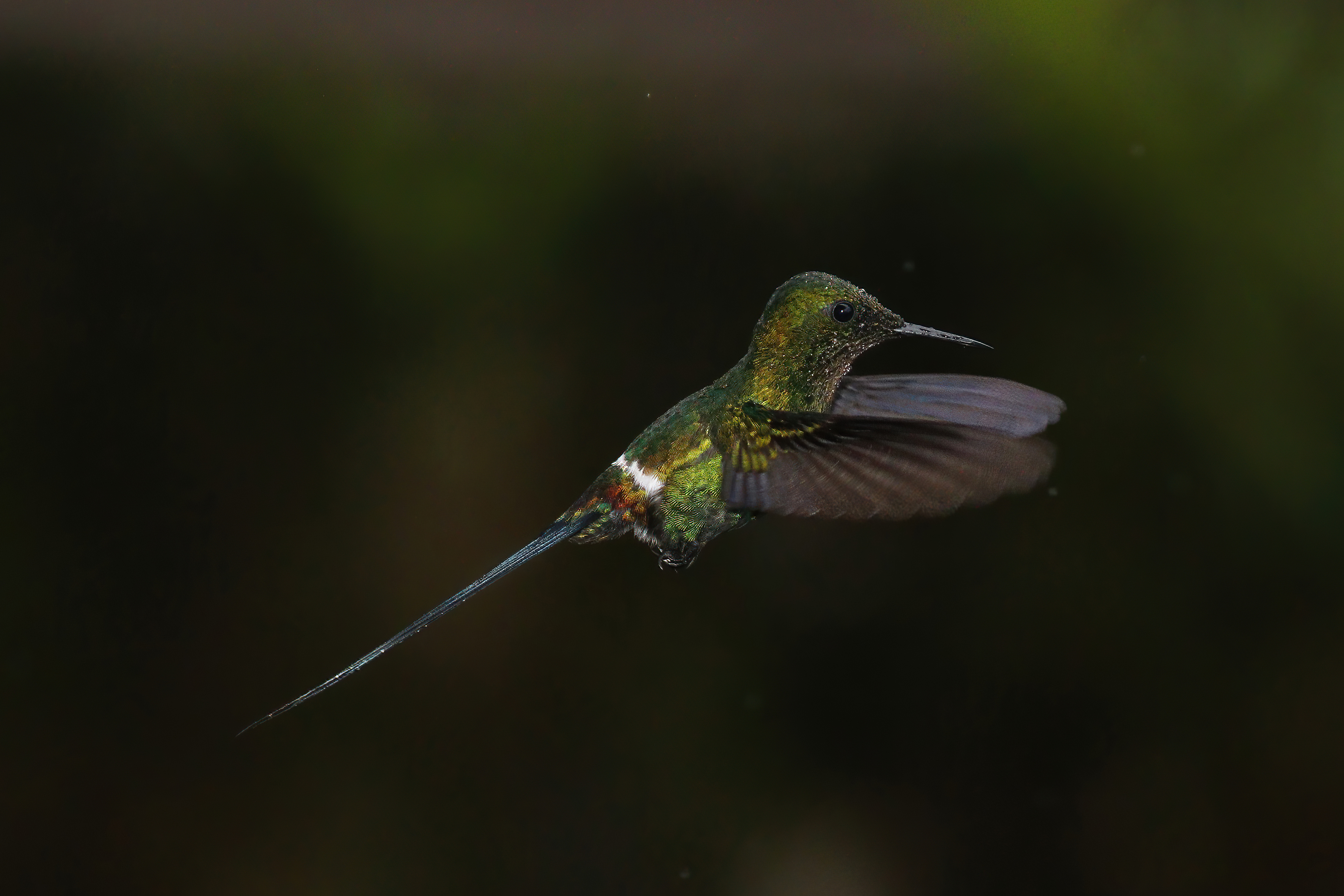
Male, Mount Totumas cloud forest, Panama

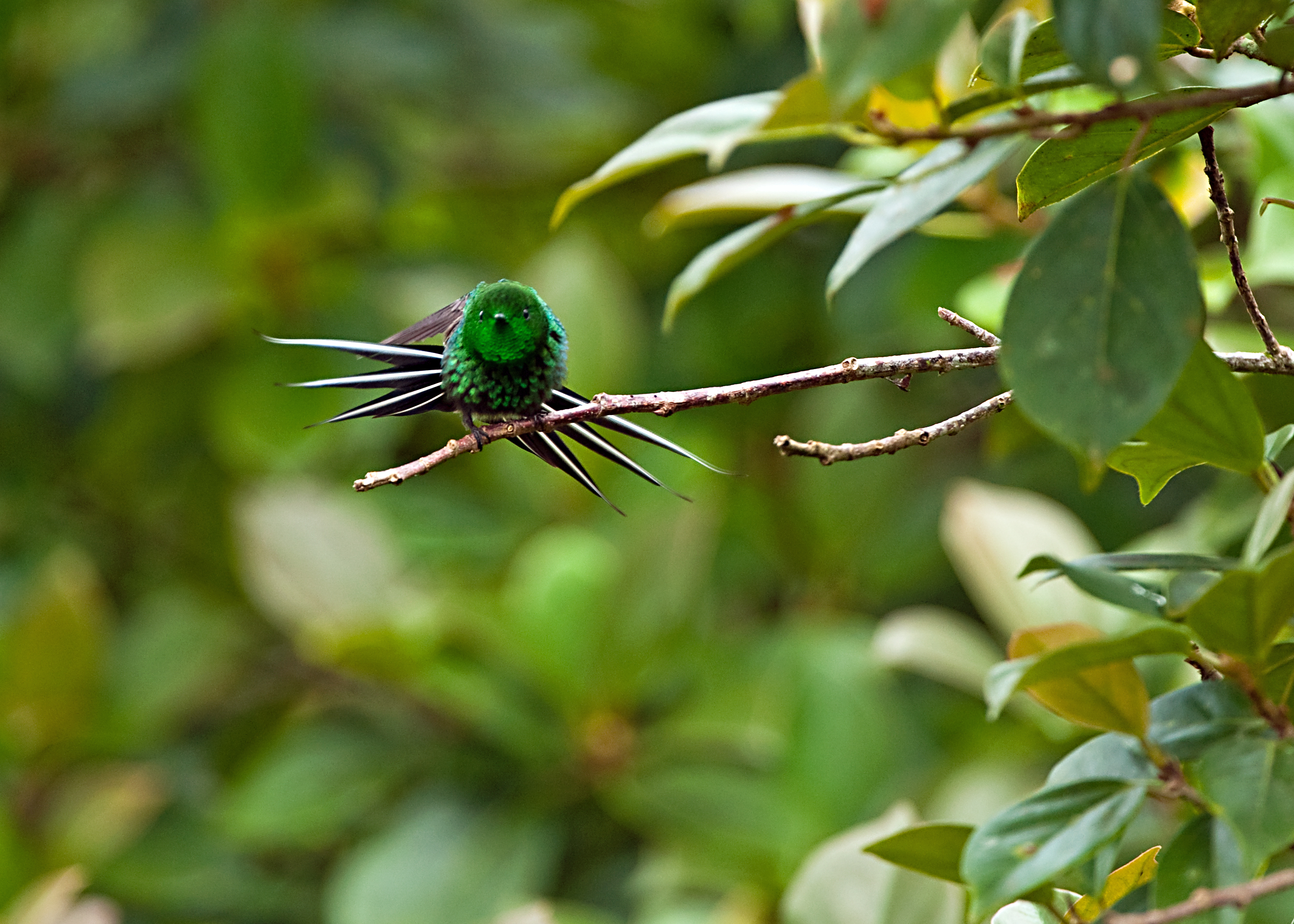
Male
