= Stachytarpheta svensonii =

Conservation status
- Critically Endangered (IUCN 3.1)

Scientific classification
- Kingdom: Plantae
- Clade: Tracheophytes
- Clade: Angiosperms
- Clade: Eudicots
- Clade: Asterids
- Order: Lamiales
- Family: Verbenaceae
- Genus: Stachytarpheta
- Species: S. svensonii

Binomial name
- Stachytarpheta svensonii Moldenke

Species of flowering plant

Stachytarpheta svensonii is a species of plant in the family Verbenaceae. It is endemic to Ecuador. Its natural habitat is subtropical or tropical dry forests.
