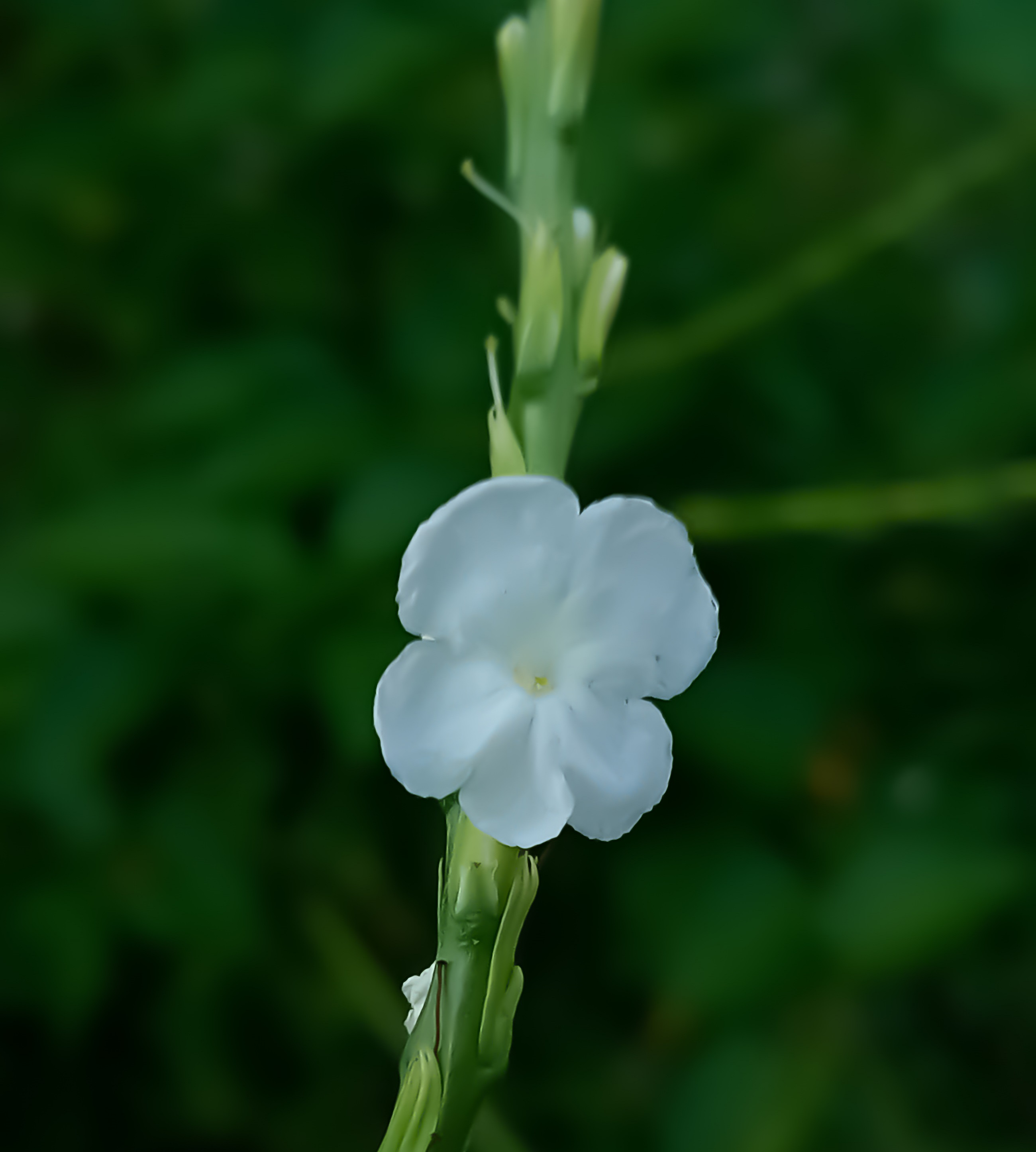

Scientific classification
- Kingdom: Plantae
- Clade: Tracheophytes
- Clade: Angiosperms
- Clade: Eudicots
- Clade: Asterids
- Order: Lamiales
- Family: Verbenaceae
- Genus: Stachytarpheta
- Species: S. indica

Binomial name
- Stachytarpheta indica (L.) Vahl

Synonyms
- Stachytarpheta angustifolia (Mill.) Vahl; Stachytarpheta angustissima Moldenke; Stachytarpheta elatior Schrad. ex Schult.; Stachytarpheta surinamensis Miq. ex Pulle; Valerianoides indica (L.) Medik.; Verbena angustifolia Mill.; Verbena caudata Salisb. nom. illeg.; Verbena indica L.; Verbena lancifolia Steud. nom. inval.; Vermicularia lancifolia Moench nom. illeg.; Zappania angustifolia (Mill.) Poir.; Zappania indica (L.) Lam.

= Stachytarpheta indica =

Species of flowering plant

Stachytarpheta indica is a species of plant in the family Verbenaceae, native to the tropical Americas. It has often been included in the species S. jamaicensis.
