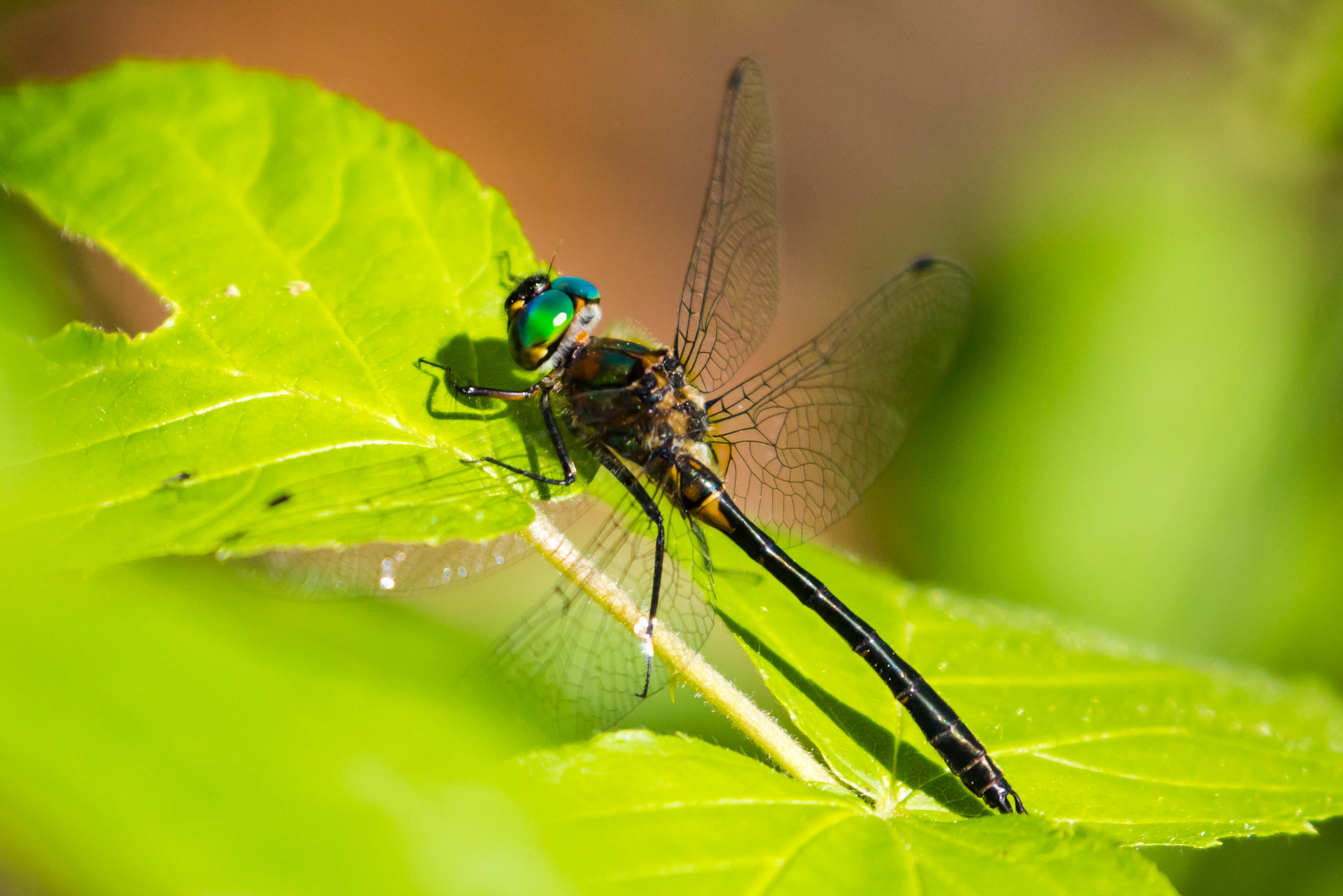

Conservation status
- Least Concern (IUCN 3.1)

Scientific classification
- Domain: Eukaryota
- Kingdom: Animalia
- Phylum: Arthropoda
- Class: Insecta
- Order: Odonata
- Infraorder: Anisoptera
- Family: Corduliidae
- Genus: Dorocordulia
- Species: D. lepida

Binomial name
- Dorocordulia lepida (Hagen in Selys, 1871)

= Dorocordulia lepida =

Species of dragonfly

Dorocordulia lepida, the petite emerald, is a species of emerald dragonfly in the family Corduliidae. It is found in North America.

The IUCN conservation status of Dorocordulia lepida is "LC", least concern, with no immediate threat to the species' survival. The population is stable.
