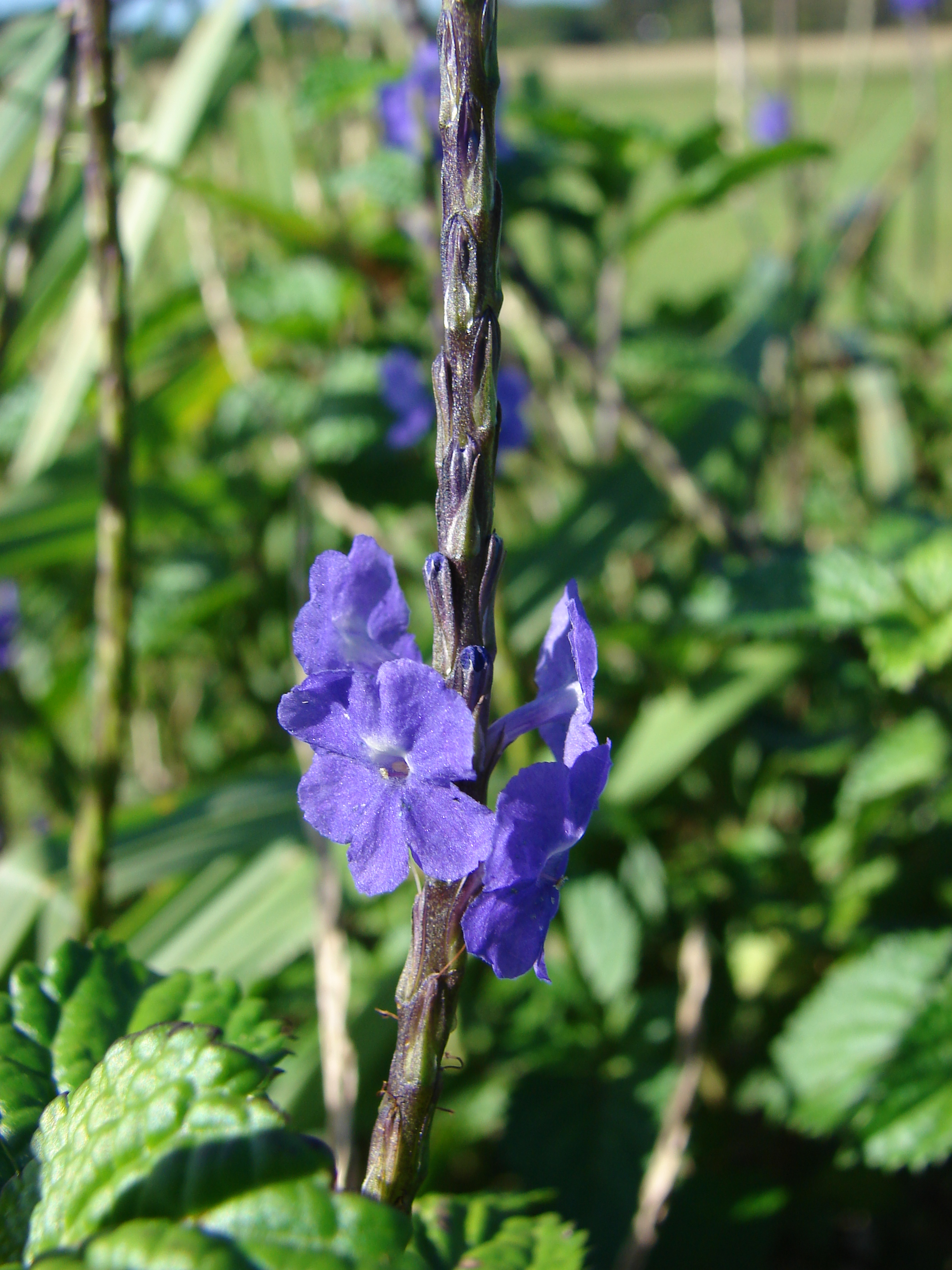

Scientific classification
- Kingdom: Plantae
- Clade: Tracheophytes
- Clade: Angiosperms
- Clade: Eudicots
- Clade: Asterids
- Order: Lamiales
- Family: Verbenaceae
- Genus: Stachytarpheta
- Species: S. cayennensis

Binomial name
- Stachytarpheta cayennensis (Rich.) Vahl

Synonyms
- Abena cayennensis (Rich.) Hitchc.; Lippia cylindrica Scheele; Stachytarpheta australis Moldenke; Stachytarpheta dichotoma (Ruiz & Pav.) Vahl; Stachytarpheta gibberosa Rchb.; Stachytarpheta guatemalensis Moldenke; Stachytarpheta hirta Kunth; Stachytarpheta patens Moldenke; Stachytarpheta subulata Moldenke; Stachytarpheta theezans Rojas Acosta; Stachytarpheta umbrosa Kunth; Stachytarpheta veronicifolia Cham.; Valerianoides cayennense (Rich.) Kuntze; Valerianoides cayennensis (Rich.) Kuntze; Valerianoides dichotoma (Ruiz & Pav.) Voss; Verbena cayennensis Rich.; Verbena dichotoma Ruiz & Pav.; Zappania cayennensis (Rich.) Mirb.; Zappania dichotoma (Ruiz & Pav.) Mirb.

= Stachytarpheta cayennensis =

Species of flowering plant

Stachytarpheta cayennensis is a species of flowering plant in the verbena family known by many English language common names, including blue snakeweed, Cayenne snakeweed, dark-blue snakeweed, bluetop, nettle-leaf porterweed, rattail, rough-leaf false vervain, blue rat's tail, Brazilian tea, Cayenne vervain, false verbena, joee, nettleleaf velvetberry, and Cayenne porterweed. Names in other languages include honagasō (Japanese), gervão-urticante (Brazilian Portuguese), piche de gato, rabo de zorro (Spanish), herbe à chenille, herbe bleue, queue de rat (French), ōi or ōwī (Hawaiian), sakura or ouchung (Chuukese), and tiāki (Māori). It is native to the Americas, from Mexico south through Central and South America to Argentina, as well as many islands of the Caribbean. It is known in many other parts of the world as an introduced species, including regions in Africa, India, Indonesia, Australia, Florida in the United States, and many Pacific Islands. Its distribution is now considered pantropical. In many places, such as New Caledonia, it has become an invasive species.

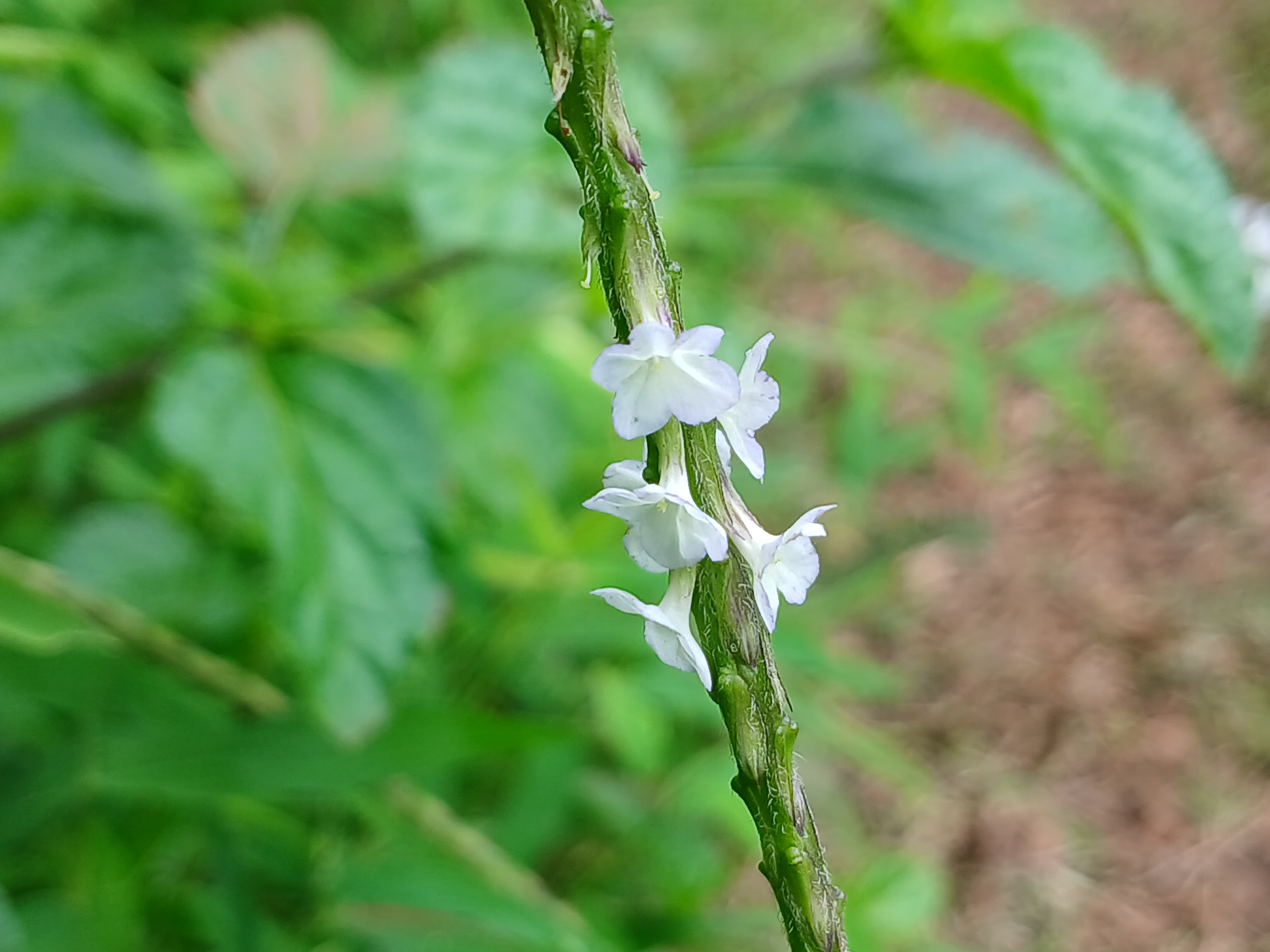
White flowered form

This plant is a perennial herb or shrub growing up to 2 or 2.5 meters tall. It has an upright, branching stem, sometimes with a woody base. The leaves are oppositely arranged. The blades are up to 8 to 10 centimeters long, oval in shape with sharply toothed edges, and rough-textured or wrinkly on the upper surfaces. The inflorescence is a very narrow spike up to 40 to 45 centimeters long covered in pointed bracts. Occasional flower corollas bloom from between the bracts. The flowers are deep purple-blue to lavender with pale centers, and white-flowered plants are known. The flowers last a single day before wilting. The plant was named for Cayenne, the capital of French Guiana.

In some places this plant is simply naturalized. It may be a casual weed, a "garden thug", a crop pest, or an invasive species with effects on the local ecosystem. It is well-adapted to disturbed, cultivated, and wasted land. It grows in pastures, on cropland, and on roadsides. In grazed fields it propagates rapidly because livestock find it distasteful, avoid it, and selectively graze out the other vegetation. In rainy areas it can form thick beds, but it easily persists in dry areas.

In Florida, this Stachytarpheta is often confused with a closely related native species, S. jamaicensis. It has appealing flower displays that attract butterflies; in its native range it was observed to attract 98 different species. It is mistakenly sold as the native ornamental, planted, and allowed to take hold. It then has the potential to become a noxious weed. Hybrids of the two species also occur when it is introduced. Intentional plantings for ornamental purposes are a common way that this plant spreads. It is also introduced when the seed is transported in garden waste, rainwater, fodder, and contaminated seed shipments, and on vehicles.

Methods of control include keeping the plants cut down or pulling them up, taking care to remove the large roots. Herbicides such as glyphosate are used.

This plant has some uses in traditional medicine. Several Latin American peoples recognize extracts of the plant as a treatment to ease the symptoms of malaria. The boiled juice or a tea made from the leaves or the whole plant is taken to relieve fever and other symptoms. It is also used for dysentery, pain, and liver disorders. A tea of the leaves is taken to help control diabetes in Peru and other areas. Laboratory tests indicate that the plant has anti-inflammatory properties.
