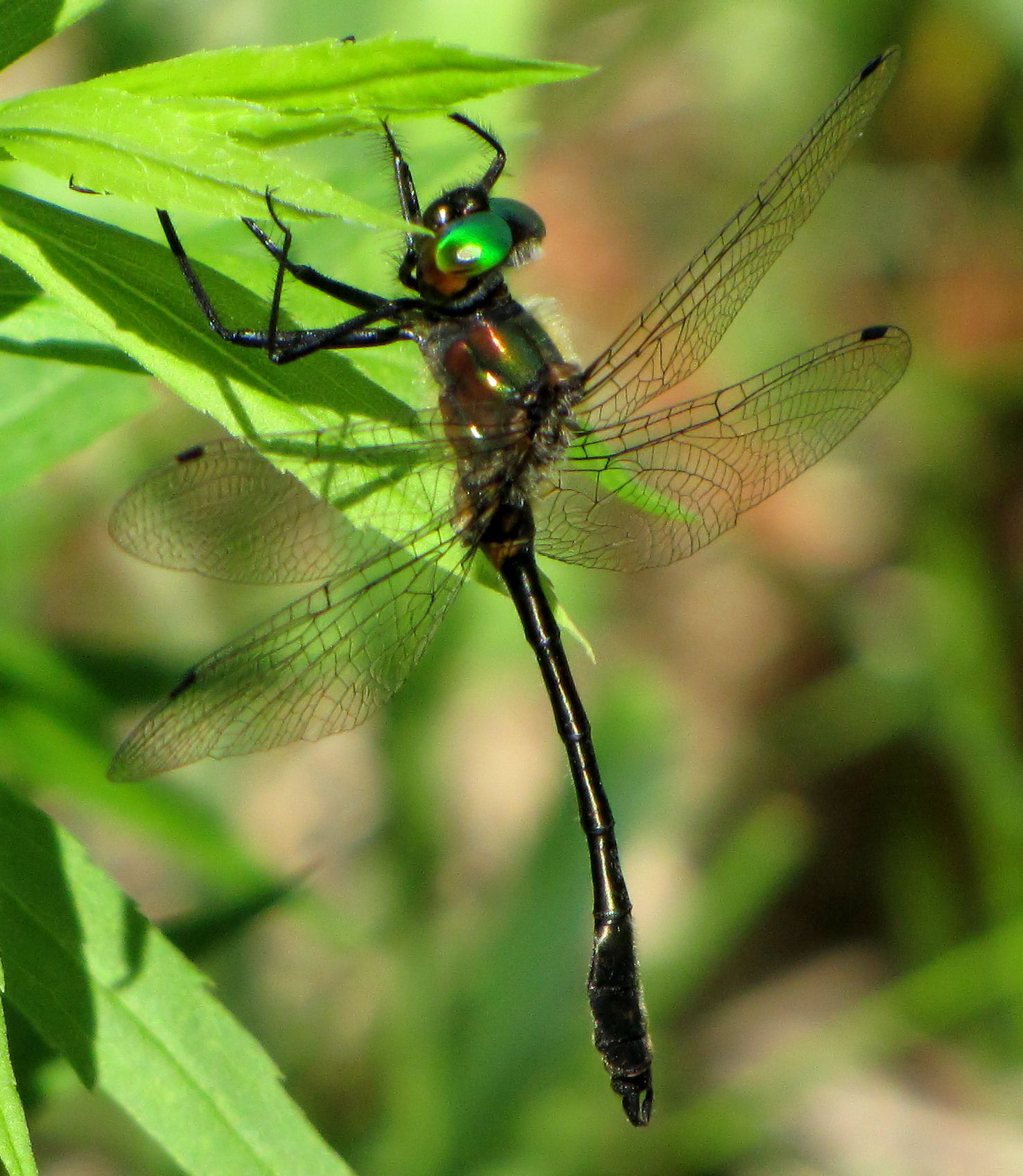
- Male
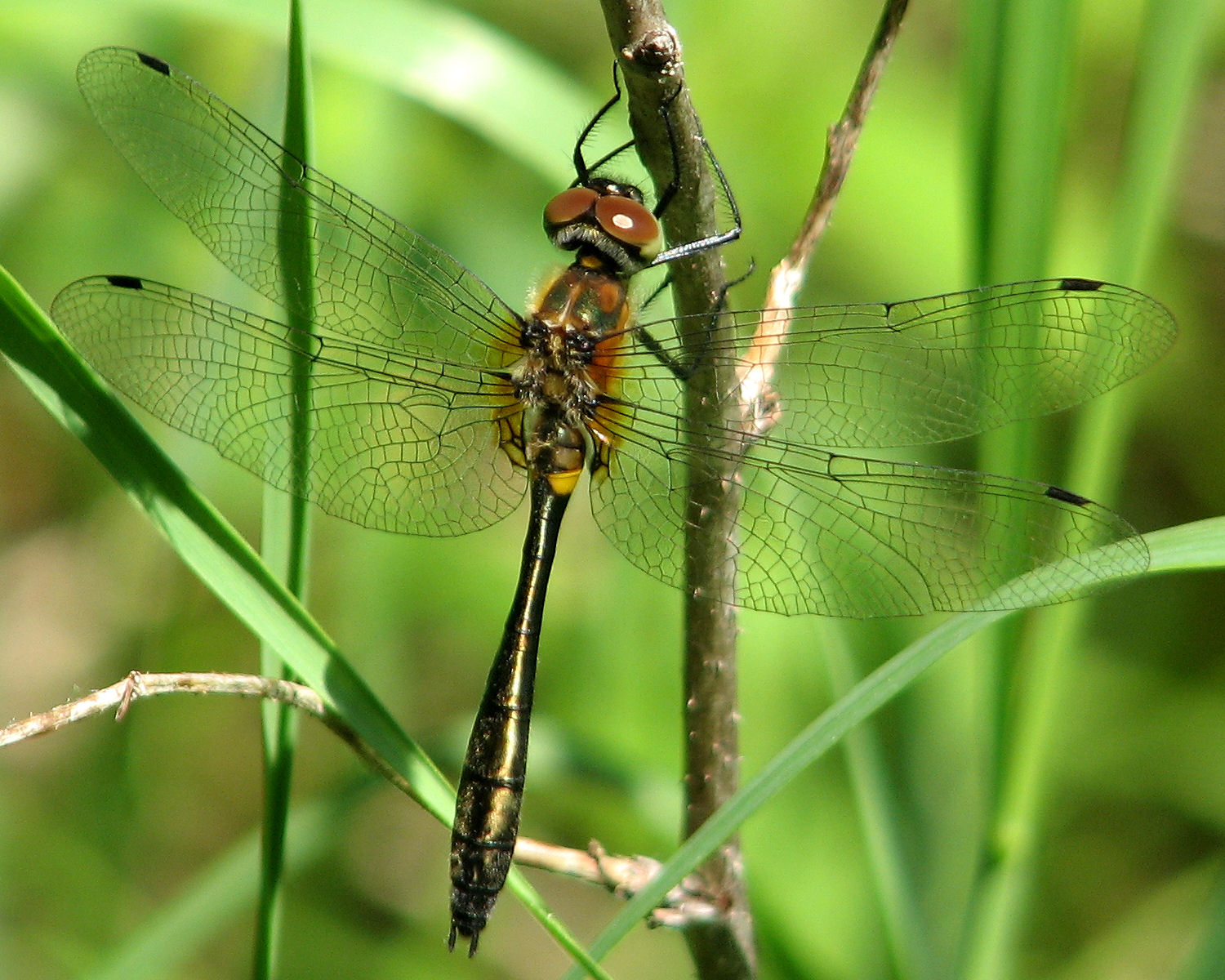
- Female

Conservation status
- Least Concern (IUCN 3.1)

Scientific classification
- Kingdom: Animalia
- Phylum: Arthropoda
- Class: Insecta
- Order: Odonata
- Infraorder: Anisoptera
- Family: Corduliidae
- Genus: Dorocordulia
- Species: D. libera

Binomial name
- Dorocordulia libera (Sélys, 1871)

= Dorocordulia libera =

Species of dragonfly

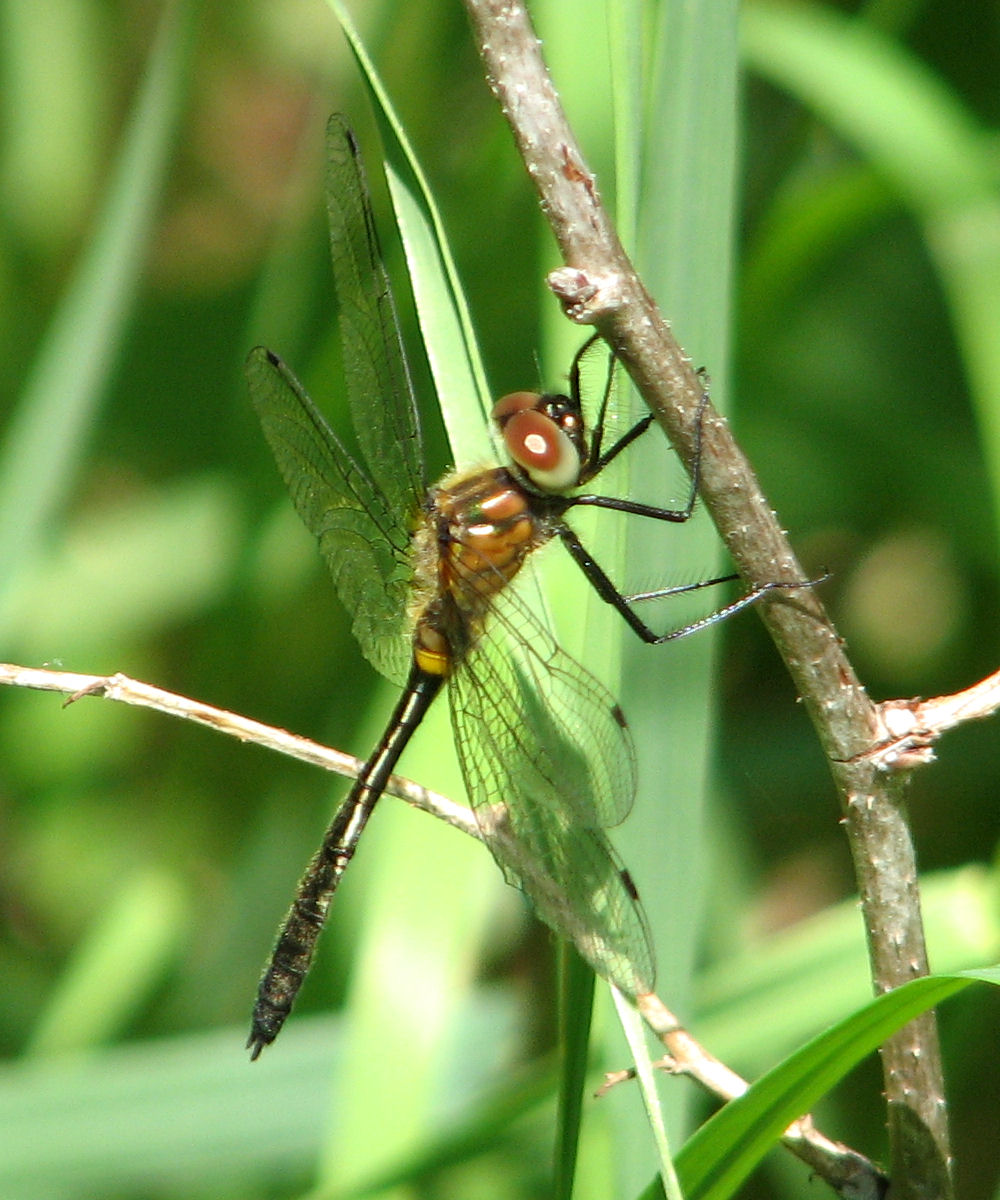
Side-view

Dorocordulia libera, the racket-tailed emerald, is a species of the dragonfly in the family Corduliidae found in North America.

Dorocordulia libera is a metallic green, slender dragonfly with brown hair, black legs, and clear wings.

== Distribution ==
Dorocodulia libera is commonly found in the Northeastern United States and southeastern Canada, often in shallow bogs, ponds, streams, and other wetlands.
