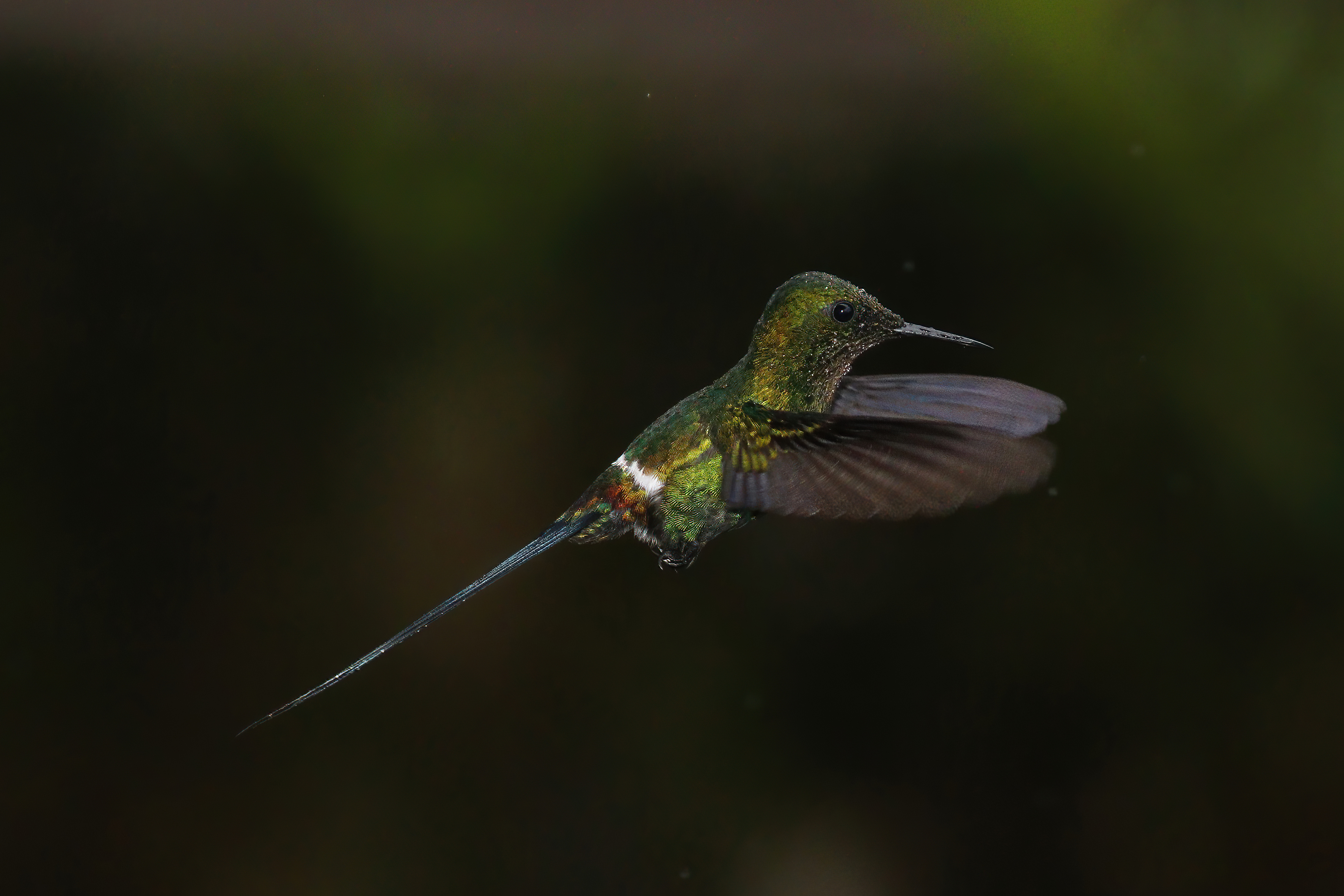
- Green thorntail, Discosura conversii

Scientific classification
- Domain: Eukaryota
- Kingdom: Animalia
- Phylum: Chordata
- Class: Aves
- Clade: Strisores
- Order: Apodiformes
- Family: Trochilidae
- Tribe: Lesbiini
- Genus: Discosura; Bonaparte, 1850

Type species
- Trochilus longicaudus (racket-tipped thorntail) Gmelin, JF, 1788

Species
- 5, see text

= Discosura =

Genus of birds

Discosura is a genus of South and Central American hummingbirds in the family Trochilidae. The thorntails are sometimes placed in the genus Popelairia (Reichenbach, 1854), leaving Discosura for the racket-tipped thorntail. On the contrary, some have argued for merging this genus into Lophornis, which they overall resemble, except for the highly modified tail-feathers of the males.

== Taxonomy ==
The genus Discosura was introduced in 1850 by the French naturalist Charles Lucien Bonaparte. Bonaparte did not specify a type species but this was designated as the racket-tipped thorntail by George Robert Gray in 1855. The genus name combines the Ancient Greek diskos meaning "plate" with oura meaning "tail".

The genus contains five species.

Genus Discosura – Bonaparte, 1850 – five species
Common name	Scientific name and subspecies	Range	Size and ecology	IUCN status and estimated population
Wire-crested thorntail Male Female	Discosura popelairii (Du Bus de Gisignies, 1846)	Colombia, Ecuador and Peru	Size: Habitat: Diet:	LC
Black-bellied thorntail Female	Discosura langsdorffi (Temminck, 1821) Two subspecies: D. l. langsdorffi (Temminck, 1821); D. l. melanosternon (Gould, 1868)	Bolivia, Brazil, Colombia, Ecuador, Peru, and Venezuela.	Size: Habitat: Diet:	LC
Letitia's thorntail	Discosura letitiae (Bourcier & Mulsant, 1852)	Probably Bolivia (only known from two old specimens of uncertain origin)	Size: Habitat: Diet:	LC
Green thorntail Male Female	Discosura conversii (Bourcier & Mulsant, 1846)	Costa Rica to Ecuador	Size: Habitat: Diet:	LC
Racket-tipped thorntail Male	Discosura longicaudus (Gmelin, JF, 1788)	Brazil, French Guiana, Guyana, Suriname, and southern Venezuela	Size: Habitat: Diet:	LC
