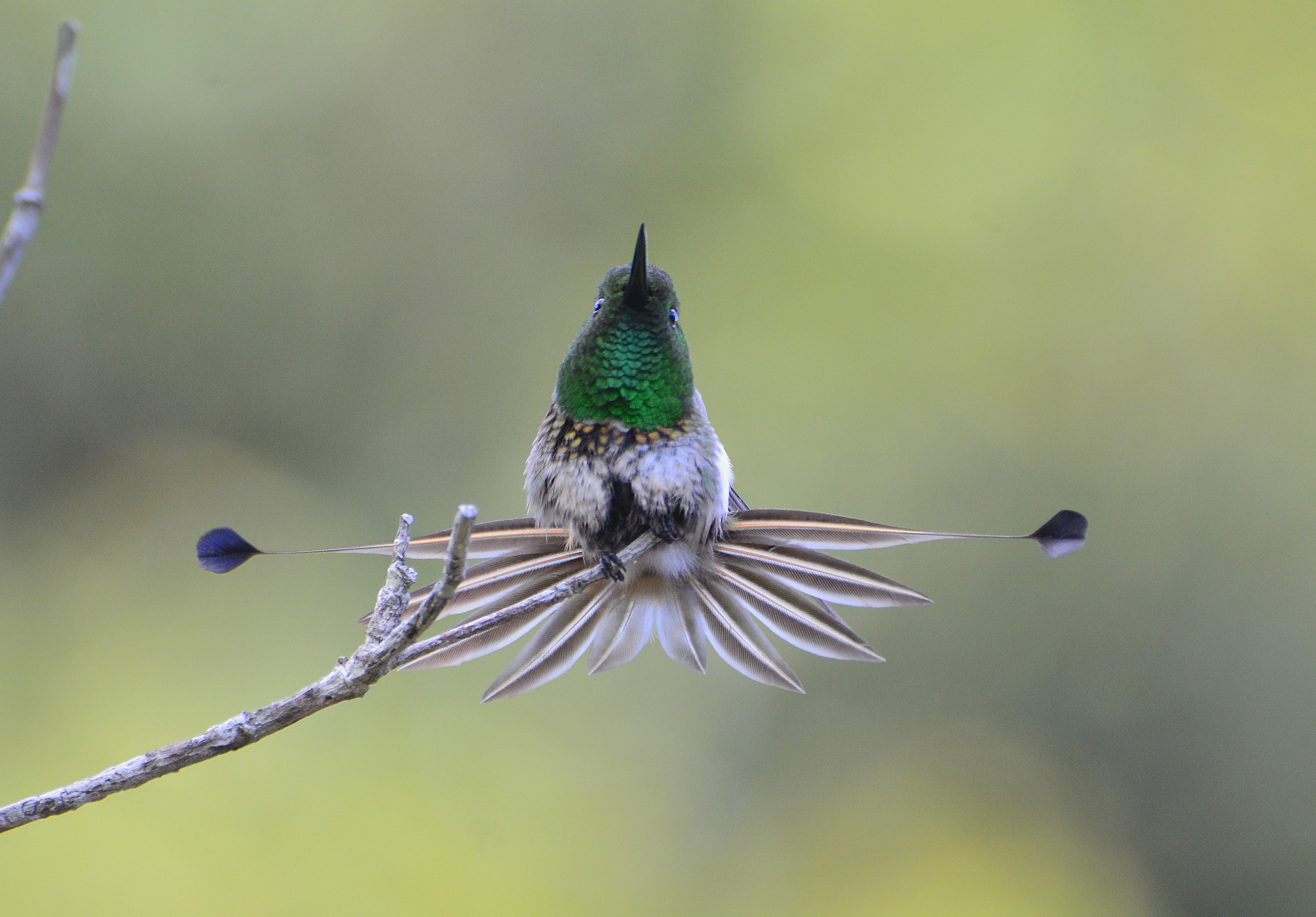
- A male in Pernambuco, Brazil, spreading its tail

Conservation status
- Least Concern (IUCN 3.1)
- CITES Appendix II (CITES)

Scientific classification
- Kingdom: Animalia
- Phylum: Chordata
- Class: Aves
- Clade: Strisores
- Order: Apodiformes
- Family: Trochilidae
- Genus: Discosura
- Species: D. longicaudus

Binomial name
- Discosura longicaudus (Gmelin, JF, 1788)
- Range of the racket-tipped thorntail

Synonyms
- Discosura longicauda (Gmelin, 1788)

= Racket-tipped thorntail =

Species of hummingbird

The racket-tipped thorntail, formerly called racket-tailed coquette, (Discosura longicaudus) is a species of hummingbird in subfamily lesbiinae of family Trochilidae. It is found in Brazil, Colombia, French Guiana, Guyana, Suriname, and Venezuela.

== Taxonomy ==
The racket-tipped thorntail was formally described in 1788 by the German naturalist Johann Friedrich Gmelin in his revised and expanded edition of Carl Linnaeus's Systema Naturae. He placed it with all the other hummingbirds in the genus Trochilus and coined the binomial name Trochilus longicaudus. Gmelin based his description on the "L'oiseau-mouche à raquettes" that had been described by the French polymath Georges-Louis Leclerc, Comte de Buffon in 1779 in his Histoire Naturelle des Oiseaux. Buffon did not specify the origin of his specimen but in 1902 Hans von Berlepsch and Ernst Hartert designated the type locality as Cayenne, French Guiana. The racket-tipped thorntail is now placed with four other hummingbirds in the genus Discosura that was introduced in 1850 by the French naturalist Charles Lucien Bonaparte. Formerly, some ornithologists erroneously used the binomial name Discosura longicauda instead of Discosura longicaudus. The genus name combines the Ancient Greek diskos meaning "plate" with oura meaning "tail". The specific epithet longicaudus combines the Latin longus meaning "long" and cauda meaning "tail".

The racket-tipped thorntail was previously called the racket-tailed coquette. Beginning in 2019 taxonomic systems gradually changed the name to match that of the other members of genus Discosura, which are all called "thorntail". In 2024 the International Ornithological Congress was the last major system to do so.

Until the late 1900s some taxonomists placed the other four thorntails in genus Popelairia, leaving the racket-tipped thorntail the only member of genus Discosura.

The racket-tipped thorntail is monotypic: No subspecies are recognized.

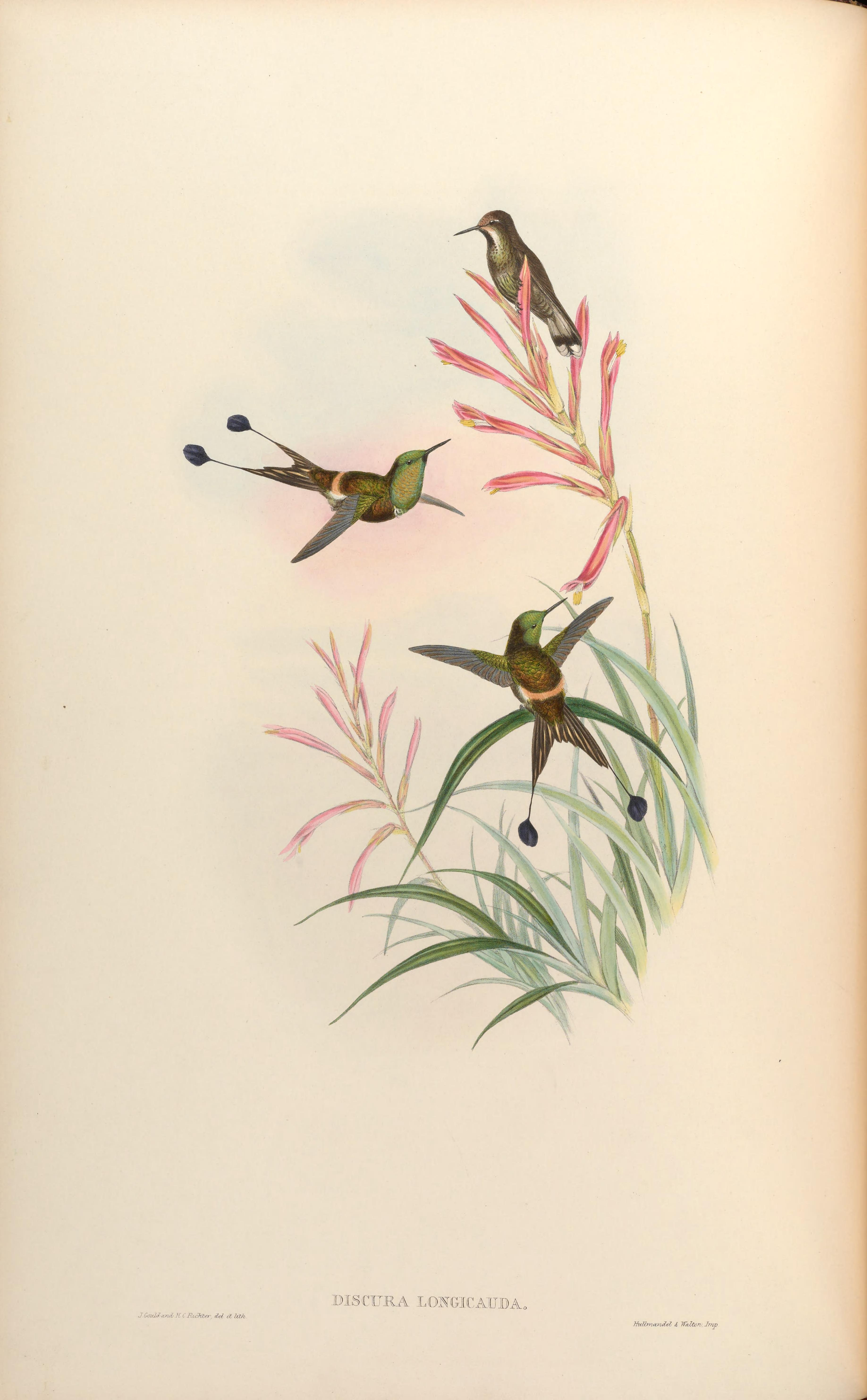
Two males (center and bottom) and a female (top) illustrated in John Gould's A monograph of the Trochilidae

== Description ==
Male racket-tipped thorntails are 10 to 12 cm (3.9 to 4.7 in) long and females about 8 to 10 cm (3.1 to 3.9 in). They weigh about 3 to 3.7 grams (0.11 to 0.13 oz). Both sexes have a short, straight, black bill. Males have an iridescent green crown and mostly bronzy green upperparts with a buffy white band across their rump. Their tail is long and mostly purplish; the outer pair of feathers are much longer and end in a wide blackish "racket". Their throat is iridescent emerald green, their lower breast golden-coppery, and their belly whitish. Females also have a green crown though it is not iridescent. Their upperparts are like the male's. Their tail is moderately long and slightly forked; the feathers are gray with a dark purple bar near the end and white tips on the outer feathers. Their throat is black with narrow white sides, their breast green, and their belly buffy white.

Martin Johnson Heade depicted two coquettes in his painting Two Green-Breasted Hummingbirds (c. 1863), as part of his "Gems of Brazil".

== Distribution and habitat ==
The racket-tipped thorntail has a disjunct distribution with two populations. The larger range is from southeastern Colombia and western Amazonas state in Brazil east through southern and eastern Venezuela, northern Brazil, and the Guianas to the Atlantic in Brazil's Amapá state. The other is near the coast of northeastern Brazil from Rio Grande do Norte south to Rio de Janeiro state. The species inhabits humid forest, typically along rivers, and also scrubby savannah. In Colombia its habitat is mostly on sandy soils. In most areas it occurs below about 200 to 250 m (660 to 820 ft) though there are Venezuelan records higher in Sierra de Lema and at about 910 m (3,000 ft) in the Gran Sabana.

== Behavior ==
=== Movement ===
The racket-tipped thorntail is generally a year-round resident throughout its range though is only known seasonally in parts of Venezuela. Its flight is "slow, weaving, and beelike."

=== Feeding ===
The racket-tipped thorntail feeds in the forest canopy, taking nectar from a variety of flowering trees both native and introduced. It also gleans small arthropods from foliage and spider webs. It is often chased by larger hummingbirds when it sneaks in to feed in their territories.

=== Breeding ===
The racket-tipped thorntail's breeding season has not been defined. The female makes a cup nest of soft plant material lined with seed down and other plant fibers. It places it on a horizontal branch between about 3 and 6 m (10 and 20 ft) above the ground. The clutch size is two eggs. The incubation period is 13 to 14 days and fledging occurs 20 to 22 days after hatch. The female alone incubates the clutch and cares for nestlings.

=== Vocalization ===
As of August 2024 the Cornell Lab of Ornithology's Macaulay Library had no recordings of racket-tipped thorntail vocalization. Xeno-canto had only six.

== Status ==
The IUCN has assessed the racket-tipped thorntail as being of Least Concern. It has a large range; its population size is not known and is believed to be decreasing. No immediate threats have been identified. It is considered rare in most of its range and rare to uncommon in Venezuela. It is "[a]ffected by extensive deforestation in many parts of range, most of which is unprotected" though it does include some protected areas. It "[d]oes not adapt to man-modified habitats".
