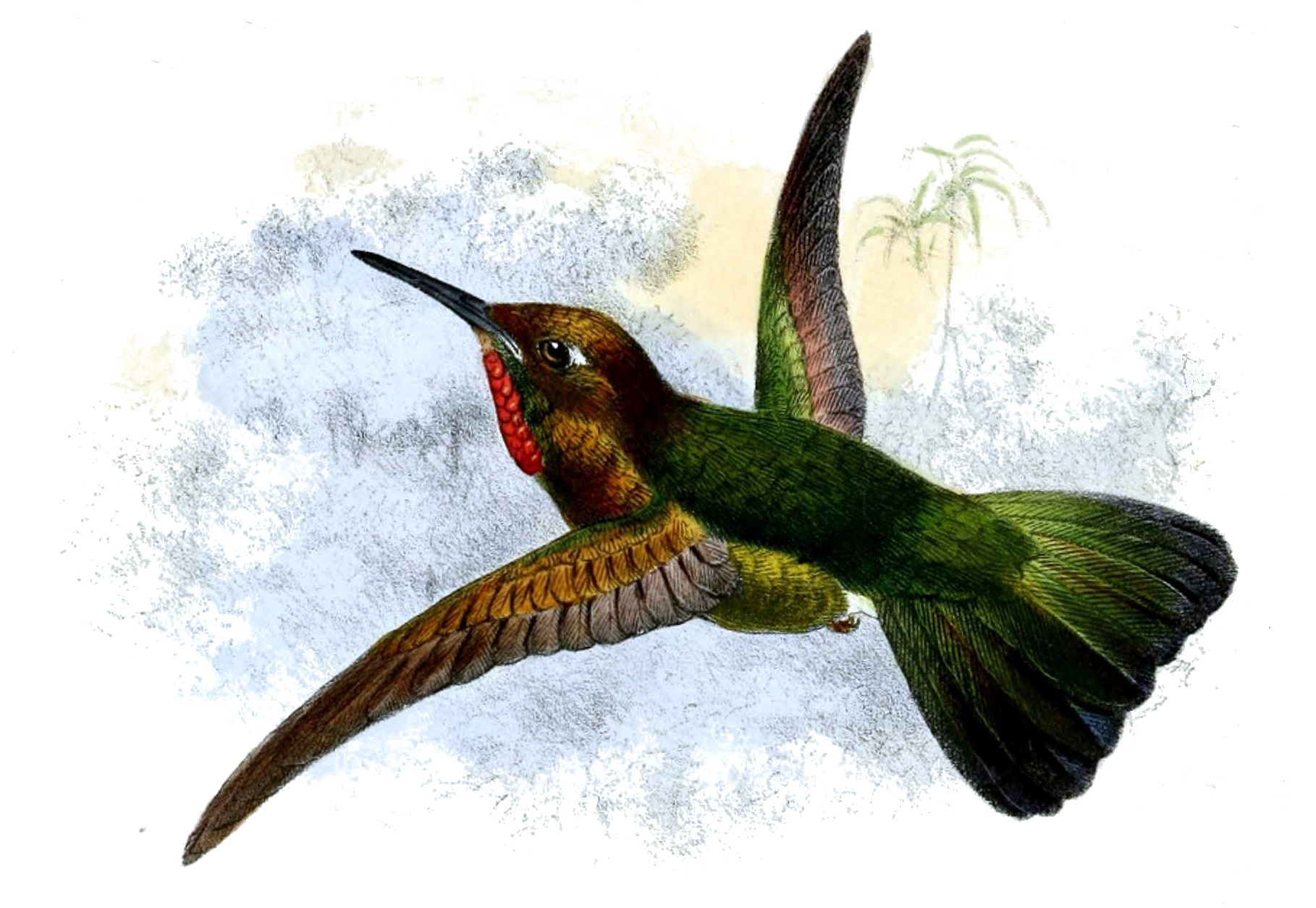

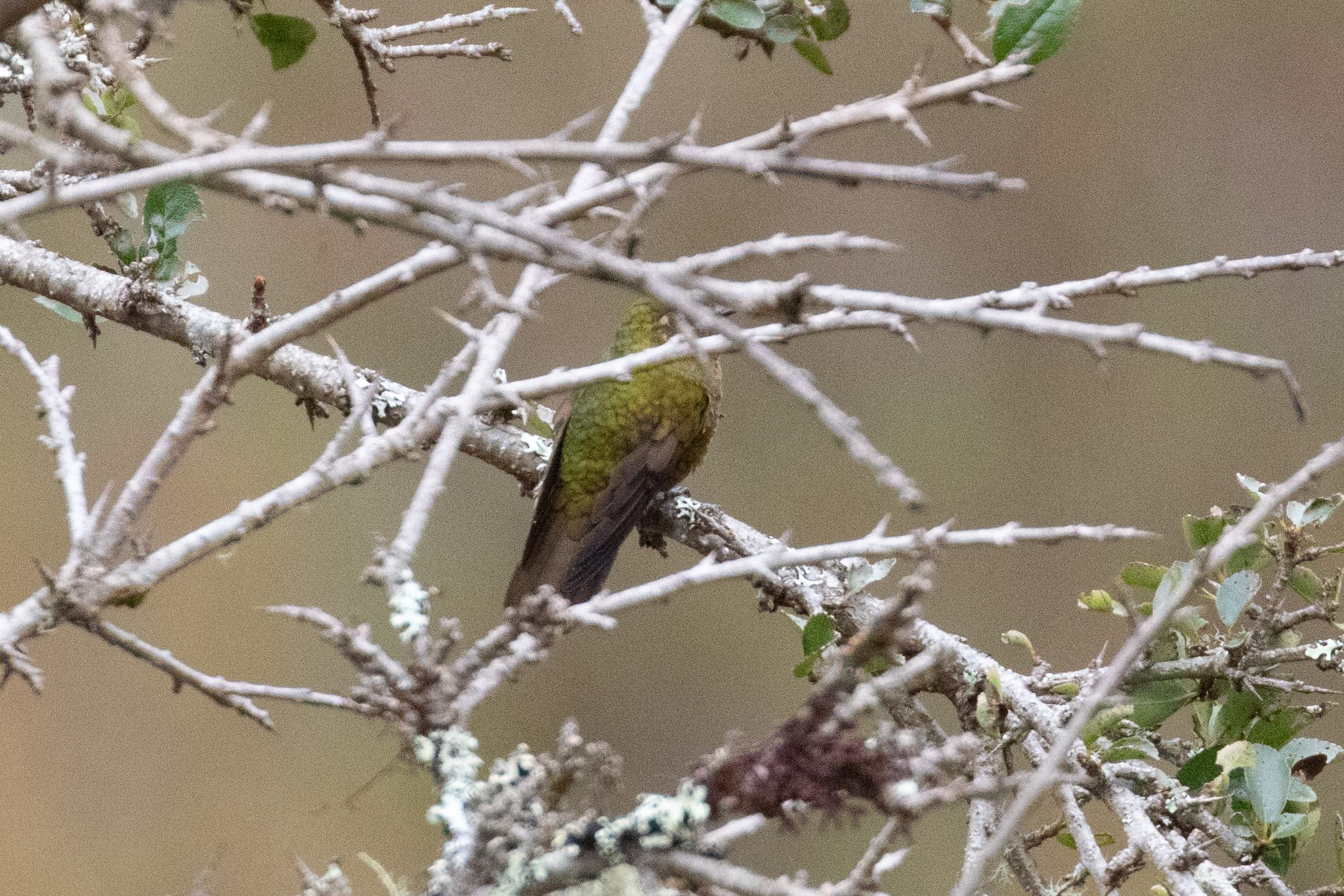

Conservation status
- Least Concern (IUCN 3.1)
- CITES Appendix II

Scientific classification
- Kingdom: Animalia
- Phylum: Chordata
- Class: Aves
- Order: Apodiformes
- Family: Trochilidae
- Genus: Metallura
- Species: M. eupogon

Binomial name
- Metallura eupogon (Cabanis, 1874)

= Fiery-throated metaltail =

Species of hummingbird

The fiery-throated metaltail or fire-throated metaltail (Metallura eupogon) is a species of hummingbird in the "coquettes", tribe Lesbiini of subfamily Lesbiinae. It is endemic to Peru.

== Taxonomy and systematics ==
The fiery-throated metaltail is monotypic. However, what are now the violet-throated metaltail (M. baroni) and neblina metaltail (M. odomae) were at times treated as subspecies of the fiery-throated.

== Description ==
The fiery-throated metaltail is about 11 cm (4.3 in) long and weighs about 5 g (0.18 oz). It has a medium length, straight, black bill. The adult male is almost entirely yellowish olive-green with bronzy overtones. Its slightly forked tail is iridescent sky blue with a green tinge on its upper side and glittering yellow-green on its underside. Its gorget is orange. The adult female is similar the male but its gorget is smaller. Juveniles are similar to the female.

== Distribution and habitat ==
The fiery-throated metaltail is found on the eastern slope of the central Andes of Peru, from just south of the Huallaga River in the Department of Huánuco south to the Apurímac River in the Department of Cuzco. Like most of the metaltails, the species inhabits the edges of dwarf and elfin forests and páramo, moist landscapes characterized by shrubby growth and small trees. It also occurs in glades within the forest. In elevation it ranges between 2,900 and 4,000 m (9,500 and 13,100 ft) and is most common above 3,500 m (11,500 ft).

== Behavior ==
=== Movement ===
The fiery-throated metaltail is believed to be sedentary but some seasonal elevational movement is possible.

=== Feeding ===
The fiery-throated metaltail's diet and feeding practices are not known. They are assumed to be similar to those of other metaltails, which feed on nectar from a variety of flowering plants and also catch small arthropods by sallies from a perch; males defend feeding territories.

=== Breeding ===
The fiery-throated metaltail's breeding phenology and nest have not been documented. Its breeding season appears to include June and July.

=== Vocalization ===
The fiery-throated metaltail's chase call is "a descending series of 3–6 squeaky notes, followed by a repeated, buzzy, jumbled phrase, 'trt-tsee-seee-seee-sew..trr-tsee-tsew..trr-tsee-tsew..'."

== Status ==
The IUCN has assessed the fiery-throated metaltail as being of Least Concern. Its population size is not known and is believed to be decreasing. It is "[p]resently not at risk due to its wide distribution and its generalized ecology...[but] may be vulnerable because of its small range" where burning of páramo to create grazing pasture is a threat.
