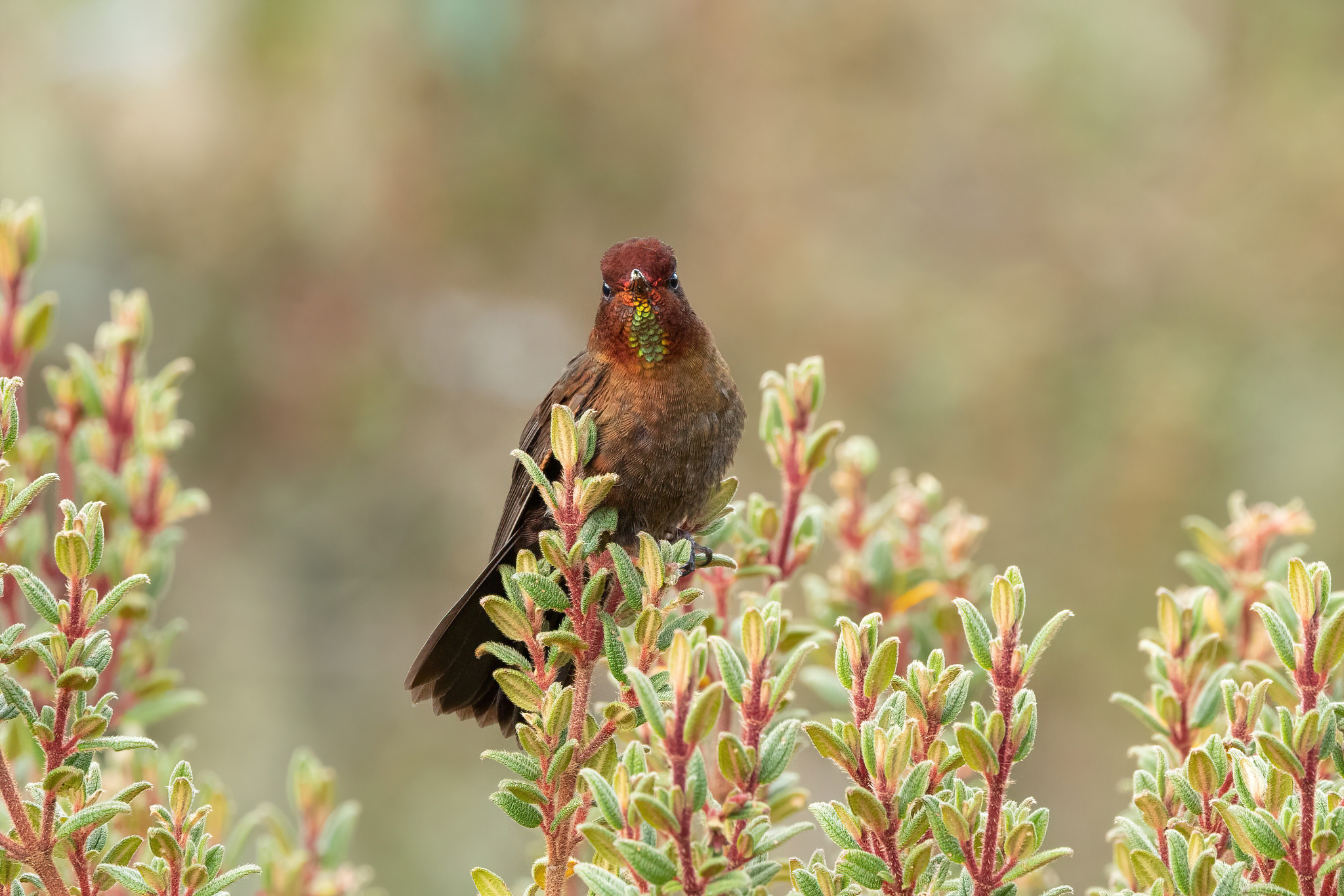

Conservation status
- Least Concern (IUCN 3.1)
- CITES Appendix II (CITES)

Scientific classification
- Kingdom: Animalia
- Phylum: Chordata
- Class: Aves
- Clade: Strisores
- Order: Apodiformes
- Family: Trochilidae
- Genus: Metallura
- Species: M. theresiae

Binomial name
- Metallura theresiae Simon, 1902

= Coppery metaltail =

Species of hummingbird

The coppery metaltail (Metallura theresiae) is a species of hummingbird in the "coquettes", tribe Lesbiini of subfamily Lesbiinae. It is endemic to Peru.

== Taxonomy and systematics ==
The coppery metaltail has two subspecies, the nominate M. t. theresiae and M. t. parkeri.

== Description ==
The coppery metaltail is 10 to 10.5 cm (3.9 to 4.1 in) long and weighs about 5 g (0.18 oz). It has a medium length, straight, black bill. The adult male of the nominate subspecies has reddish bronze to reddish coppery upperparts with a greenish tone to the rump and uppertail coverts. Its slightly forked tail is bronze green with violet reflections on its upper side and shining bronze green on its underside. The sides of its head and neck are reddish bronze and its narrow gorget is glittering golden green. The rest of its underparts are a somewhat less reddish bronze green than the upperparts. The adult female is a duller version of the male and its gorget is smaller. Juveniles do not have gorget. Subspecies M. t. parkeri is similar to the nominate but its uppersides are not as reddish and the underside of its tail is a brighter golden green.

== Distribution and habitat ==
The nominate subspecies of coppery metaltail is found on the eastern slope of the Peruvian Andes from east of the Marañón River south into Huánuco Department. M. t. parkeri is known only from the Cordillera de Colán in Peru's Amazonas Department. Like most of the metaltails, the species inhabits the edges of elfin forest and páramo, moist landscapes characterized by shrubby growth and small trees. In elevation it ranges between 2,800 and 3,550 m (9,200 and 12,000 ft).

== Behavior ==
=== Movement ===
The coppery metaltail is believed to be resident throughout its range.

=== Feeding ===
The coppery metaltail feeds mostly on nectar but details of its diet are lacking. Males defend feeding territories. In addition to nectaring, it catches small arthropods by sallies from a perch.

=== Breeding ===
The coppery metaltail's breeding phenology and nest have not been documented. Its breeding season appears to include August and September.

=== Vocalization ===
The coppery metaltail's vocalizations have been described as a "series of frail zeee calls, often alternating with ttrrrt notes" and also as "a jerky, wiry chatter similar to [that of] Tyrian Metaltail [Metallura tyrianthina], but perhaps lower, less emphatic, with buzzier notes."

== Status ==
The IUCN has assessed the coppery metaltail as being of Least Concern. Its population size is not known and is believed to be decreasing. It is deemed fairly common to locally very common. Though human density in its high elevation habitat is low, burning of páramo to create grazing pasture is a threat.
