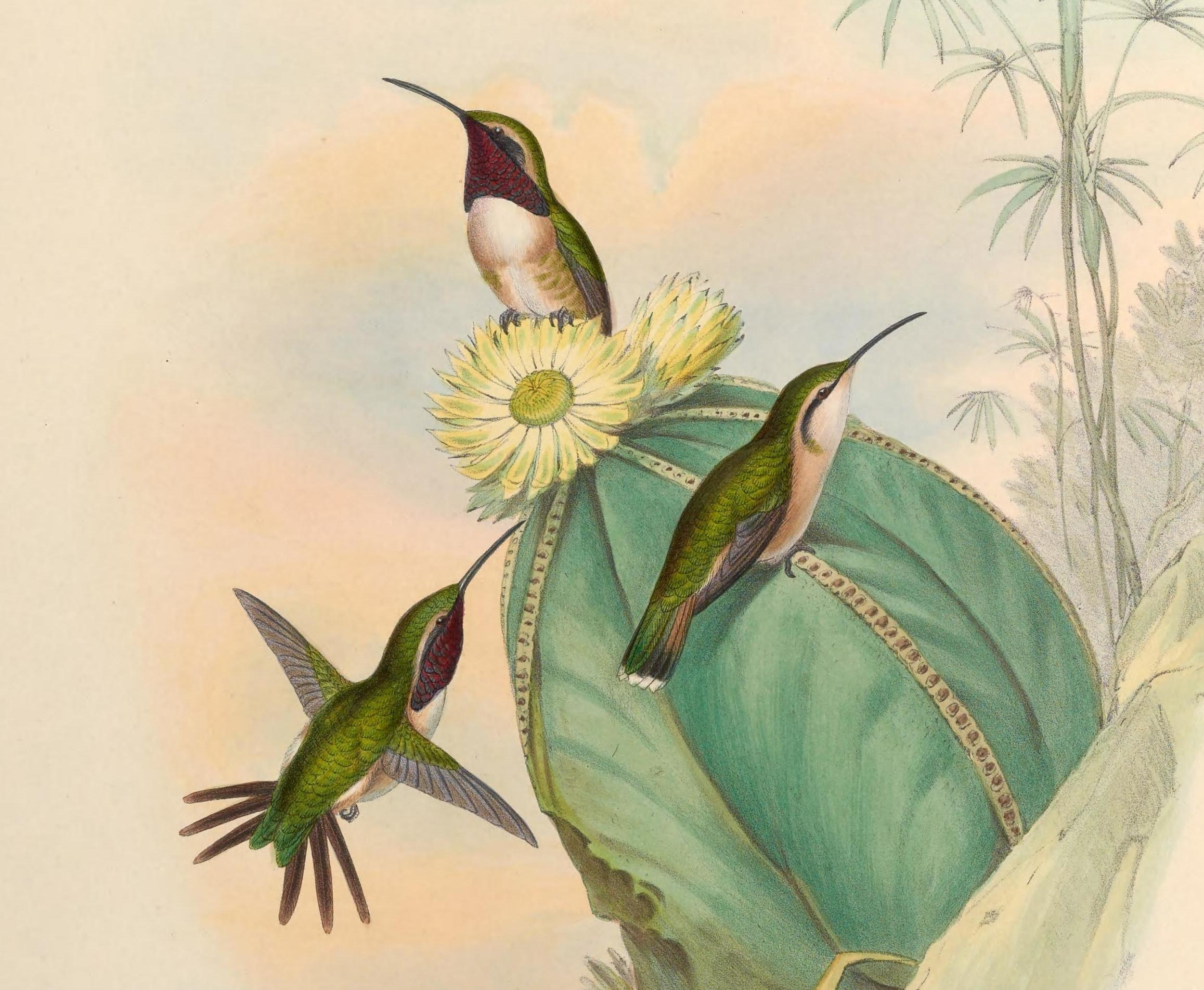

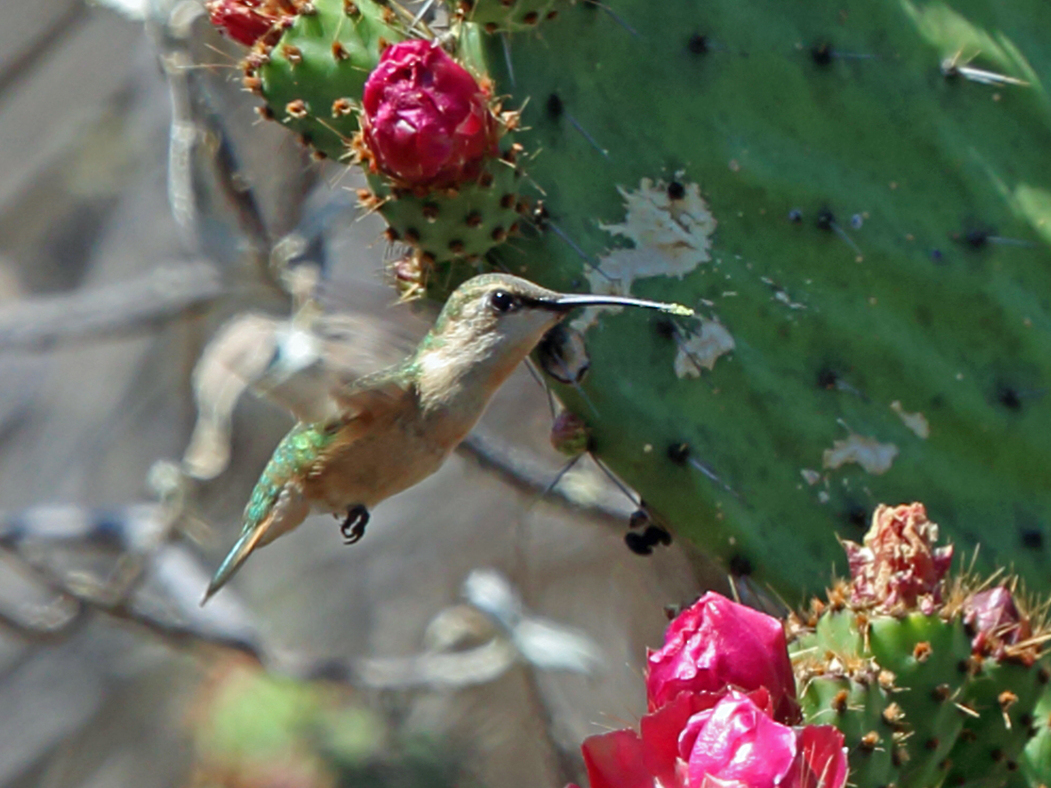

Conservation status
- Least Concern (IUCN 3.1)
- CITES Appendix II

Scientific classification
- Kingdom: Animalia
- Phylum: Chordata
- Class: Aves
- Order: Apodiformes
- Family: Trochilidae
- Genus: Calothorax
- Species: C. pulcher

Binomial name
- Calothorax pulcher Gould, 1859

= Beautiful sheartail =

Species of hummingbird

The beautiful sheartail or beautiful hummingbird (Calothorax pulcher) is a species of hummingbird in tribe Mellisugini of subfamily Trochilinae, the "bee hummingbirds". It is endemic to Mexico.

== Taxonomy and systematics ==
The beautiful sheartail shares genus Calothorax with the Lucifer sheartail (C. lucifer). It is monotypic.

== Description ==
The beautiful sheartail is 7.7 to 9 cm (3.0 to 3.5 in) long and weighs about 2.2 to 3 g (0.078 to 0.11 oz). Both sexes have a long, slightly decurved, black bill. Males have metallic bronze green upperparts and a white stripe behind the eye. Their gorget is metallic magenta purple that is more violet and blue to the rear; the rear feathers are elongated. The breast is grayish white, the flanks metallic bronze green, and the undertail coverts white. The tail is long and forked. The central two pairs of feathers are metallic bronze green and the other three pairs bronzy black. The female's upperparts are also metallic bronze green that is duller on the crown. The underparts are pale grayish buff with cinnamon buff flanks. The tail is shorter than the male's and rounded. Its central two pairs of feathers are bright bronze green. The three outer pairs have light cinnamon rufous bases and the balance is black but for white tips on the outer two pairs.

== Distribution and habitat ==
The beautiful sheartail is found only in south central Mexico, from central Guerrero and southern Puebla south to Oaxaca. It inhabits arid and semiarid scrublands, semi-open areas with trees and shrubs, and gallery forest, mostly within interior valleys. In elevation it ranges between 1,000 and 2,200 m (3,300 and 7,200 ft).

== Behavior ==
=== Movement ===
The beautiful sheartail is generally thought to be a year-round resident, but a few relocate to near sea level in Oaxaca after breeding.

=== Feeding ===
The beautiful sheartail mostly forages close to the ground but will feed at any height vegetation. It takes nectar from a wide variety of plants though details are lacking. Its close relative the Lucifer hummingbird defends patches of flowers. In addition to feeding on nectar, the beautiful sheartail takes small insects by hawking from a perch.

=== Breeding ===
Male beautiful sheartails make a courtship display by rocking back and forth in front of the female and then making a diving and swooping flight. Their breeding season appears to span from May to November. One nest was a cup made from fine plant down with pappi on the outside and held to a branch with spiderweb. The clutch was two eggs. Little else is known about the species' breeding phenology.

=== Vocalization ===
During the flight section of the courtship display, the male beautiful sheartail repeats "a very high, thin to slightly squeaky t-swiik t-swiik ... or w-siiu w-siiu ...". The species' call is "high, twittering chips".

== Status ==
The IUCN has assessed the beautiful sheartail as being of Least Concern. It has a fairly large range and an estimated population of between 20,000 and 50,000 mature individuals. However, the population is believed to be decreasing. No specific threats have been identified.
