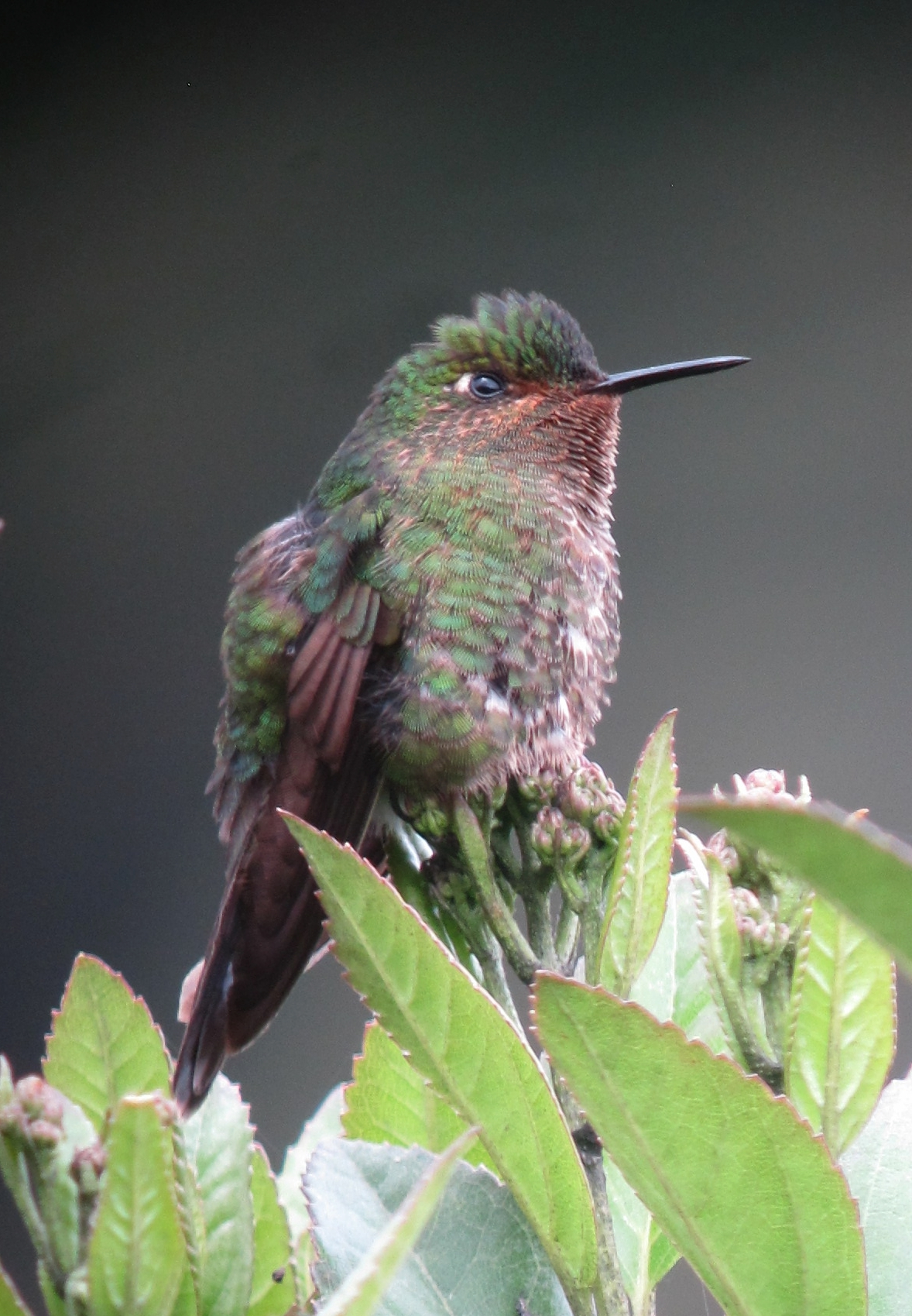

Conservation status
- Least Concern (IUCN 3.1)
- CITES Appendix II

Scientific classification
- Kingdom: Animalia
- Phylum: Chordata
- Class: Aves
- Order: Apodiformes
- Family: Trochilidae
- Genus: Metallura
- Species: M. williami

Binomial name
- Metallura williami (Delattre & Bourcier, 1846)

= Viridian metaltail =

Species of hummingbird

The viridian metaltail (Metallura williami) is a species of hummingbird in the "coquettes", tribe Lesbiini of subfamily Lesbiinae. It is found in Colombia and Ecuador.

== Taxonomy and systematics ==
The viridian metaltail has these four recognized subspecies:

- M. w. recisa Wetmore, 1970
- M. w. williami (Delattre & Bourcier), 1846
- M. w. primolina Bourcier, 1853
- M. w. atrigularis Salvin, 1893

Subspecies M. w. primolina and M. w. atrigularis were at one time each treated as separate species but since at least the mid 20th century have been considered subspecies. However, in the early 21st century atrigularis was again suggested as a possible separate species.

== Description ==
The viridian metaltail is 11 to 12 cm (4.3 to 4.7 in) long and weighs 4.1 to 5.3 g (0.14 to 0.19 oz). It has a medium length, straight, black bill. The adult male of the nominate subspecies has bottle green upper- and underparts. Its gorget is glittering bottle green and it has a purplish blue, slightly forked, tail. The adult female's upperparts are also bottle green. Its throat, breast, and belly are mottled green and white and its outer tail feathers have whitish tips on their underside. Juveniles are similar to adult females.

Subspecies M. w. recisa has a shorter bill, a more deeply forked tail, and shinier underparts than the nominate. M. w. primolina's tail is reddish black on top and shining green below and only slightly forked. M. w. atrigularis has a black patch in the center of its gorget; its tail is slightly forked and its underside is shining green.

== Distribution and habitat ==
The subspecies of viridian metaltail are found thus:

- M. w. recisa, municipality of Frontino in the Western Andes of Colombia's Antioquia Department
- M. w. williami, both slopes of Colombia's Central Andes
- M. w. primolina, from the Andes of southern Colombia's Nariño Department into Ecuador as far south as northern Azuay Province
- M. w. atrigularis, Andes of southern Ecuador from Morona-Santiago Province almost to Peru

The viridian metaltail inhabits páramo grasslands with scattered shrubs and the shrubby edges of humid montane forest and elfin forest. In Ecuador it usually occurs between 2,700 and 3,600 m (8,900 and 11,800 ft) of elevation and ranges up to 4,000 m (13,000 ft) in Colombia. There have been sightings as low as 2,100 m (6,900 ft).

== Behavior ==
=== Movement ===
The viridian metaltail is assumed to be sedentary, but males might disperse to the higher elevations outside the breeding season.

=== Feeding ===
The viridian metaltail forages at all levels of its habitat's vegetation. It feeds on nectar while hovering and favors shrubs of families Ericaceae and Melastomataceae. Males defend feeding territories.

=== Breeding ===
The viridian metaltail's breeding season has not been well defined but appears to be within February to August. Nests are made of moss lined with soft plant down and small feathers, and are often placed in a rocky niche or other sheltered spot. The female incubates the clutch of two white eggs.

=== Vocalization ===
One vocalizatin of the viridian metaltail is "a descending series of 3–5 squeaky notes, often followed by several jumbled dry buzzy trills 'trsee-seee-seee-sew..trrk-tsetswe-trrk'". It also makes " repeated dry buzzy or gravelly notes."

== Status ==
The IUCN has assessed the viridian metaltail as being of Least Concern. It has a large range but its population size is unknown and believed to be decreasing. It occurs in several protected areas but much of its páramo habitat has been burned for conversion to cattle pasture.
