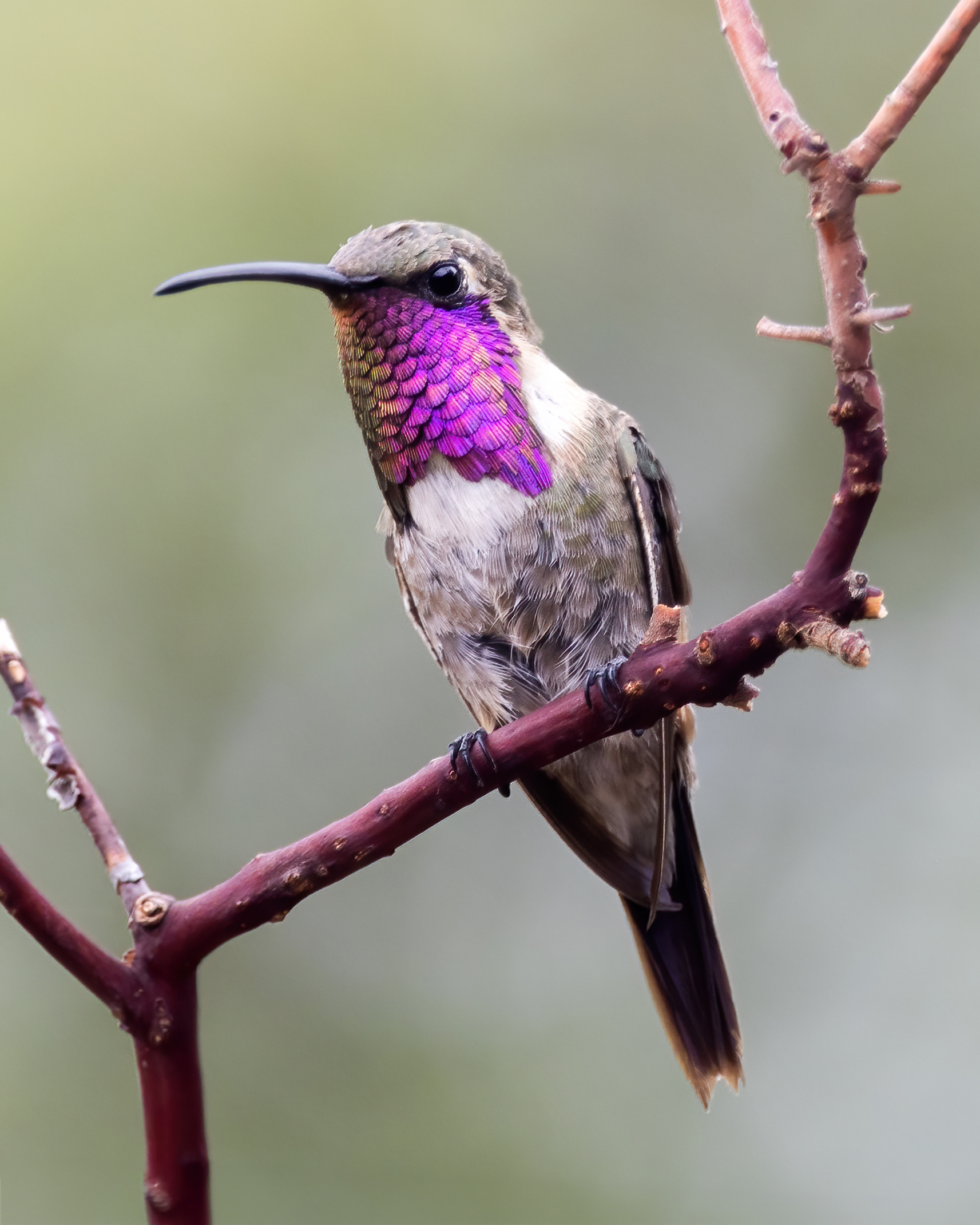
- Male lucifer sheartail
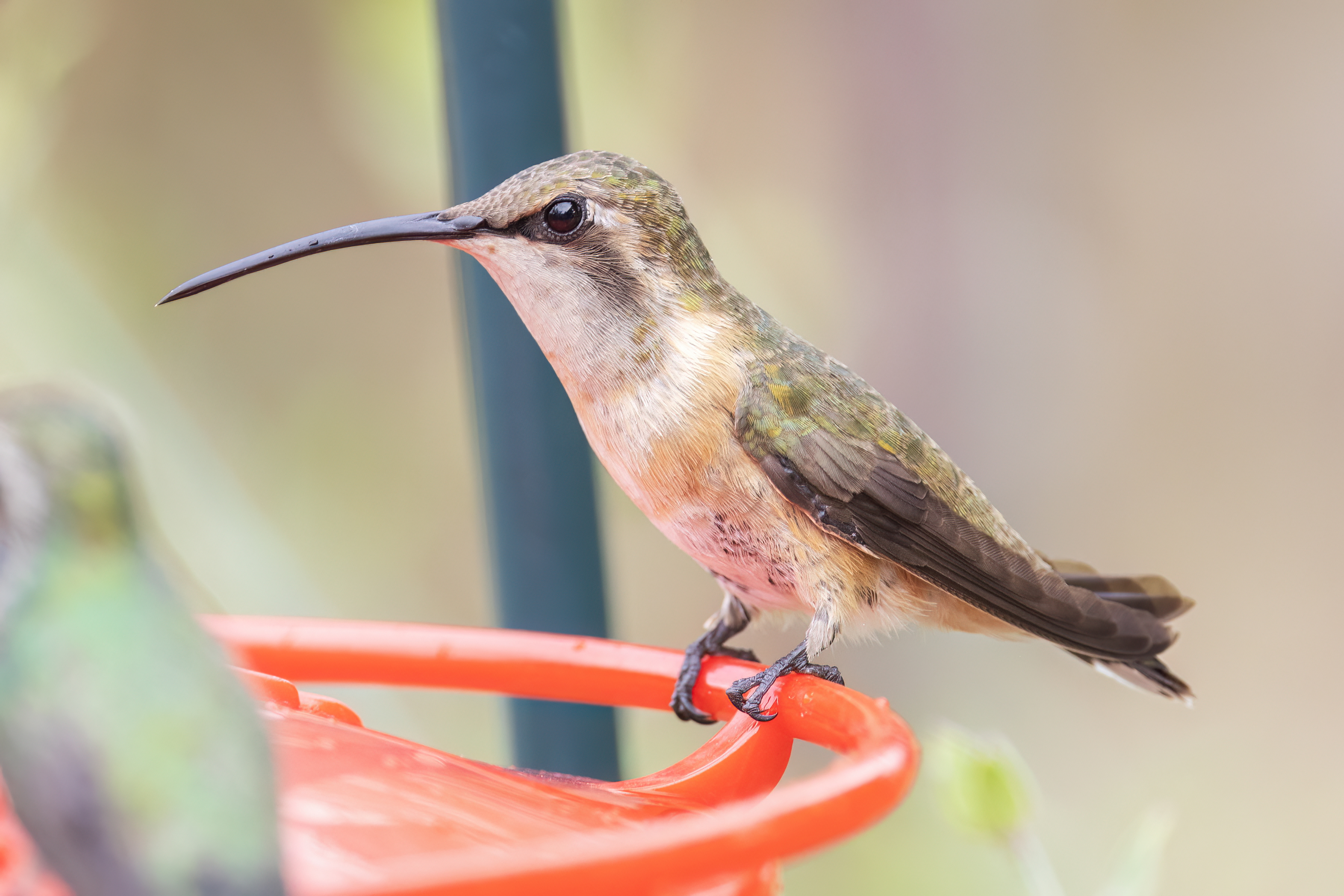
- Female lucifer sheartail

Conservation status
- Least Concern (IUCN 3.1)
- CITES Appendix II

Scientific classification
- Kingdom: Animalia
- Phylum: Chordata
- Class: Aves
- Clade: Strisores
- Order: Apodiformes
- Family: Trochilidae
- Genus: Calothorax
- Species: C. lucifer

Binomial name
- Calothorax lucifer (Swainson, 1827)
- breeding range Non-breeding range

= Lucifer sheartail =

Species of hummingbird in desert habitats of Mexico and the southwestern United States

The lucifer sheartail or lucifer hummingbird (Calothorax lucifer) is a medium-sized, 10 cm long, green hummingbird with a slightly curved bill and distinctive outward flare of its gorget feathers. Its habitat is in high-altitude areas of northern Mexico and southwestern United States. It winters in central Mexico.

== Taxonomy ==
The lucifer sheartail was formally described in 1827 by the English zoologist William Swainson based on a specimen collected at Temascaltepec in central Mexico. Swainson placed the species in the genus Cynanthus and coined the binomial name Cynanthus lucifer. The specific epithet lucifer is Latin meaning "light-bearing" from lux, lucis meaning "light" and -fera meaning "-bearing". The lucifer sheartail is now placed with the beautiful sheartail in the genus Calothorax that was introduced in 1840 by the English zoologist George Robert Gray.

== Description ==
The lucifer sheartail is a medium-sized, 10-centimetre (3.9 in) long, green hummingbird with a long curved bill, small wings, and white streak behind its eye. The male has an iridescent plumage, forked dark tail, green crown, long magenta gorget, and white underparts. The female is larger with duller plumage, pale throat and white or buff feathers underside, usually with crimson trim.

== Distribution ==
The lucifer sheartail is distributed to deserts and arid areas with agave plants in the southwestern United States, from southwest Texas, extreme southwestern New Mexico to southeastern Arizona, and in central and northern Mexico. It is also found in the Madrean sky islands of the northern end of the Sierra Madre Occidental, Mexico. Its preferred habitat tends to be at altitudes of 3,500–5,500 feet (1,100–1,700 m) in canyons, mountain slopes, and dry washes having desert shrubs and cacti. In winter, the birds migrate to central Mexico.

== Diet ==
The diet consists mainly of nectar from agave and colorful desert flowers, spiders and small insects. Lucifer sheartails have a typical hummingbird flight style while feeding from flowers, catching insects in flight, and flying in straight lines to specific destinations for other food, the nest or for roosting. Males defend feeding areas from males, other females, and black-chinned hummingbirds. However, most C. lucifer are non-territorial and forage at undefended agave or agave surrounded by dense vegetation.

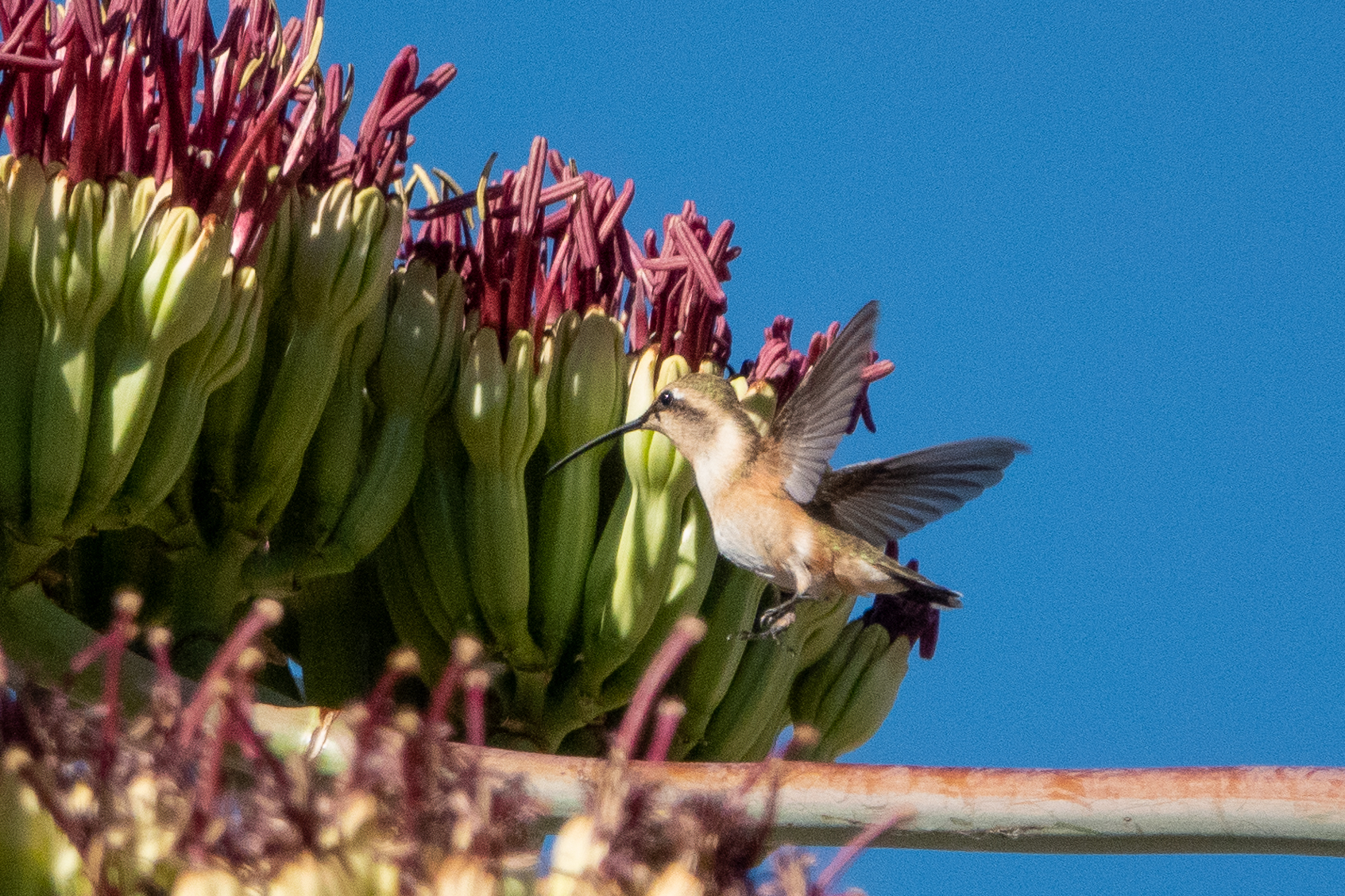
Female feeding

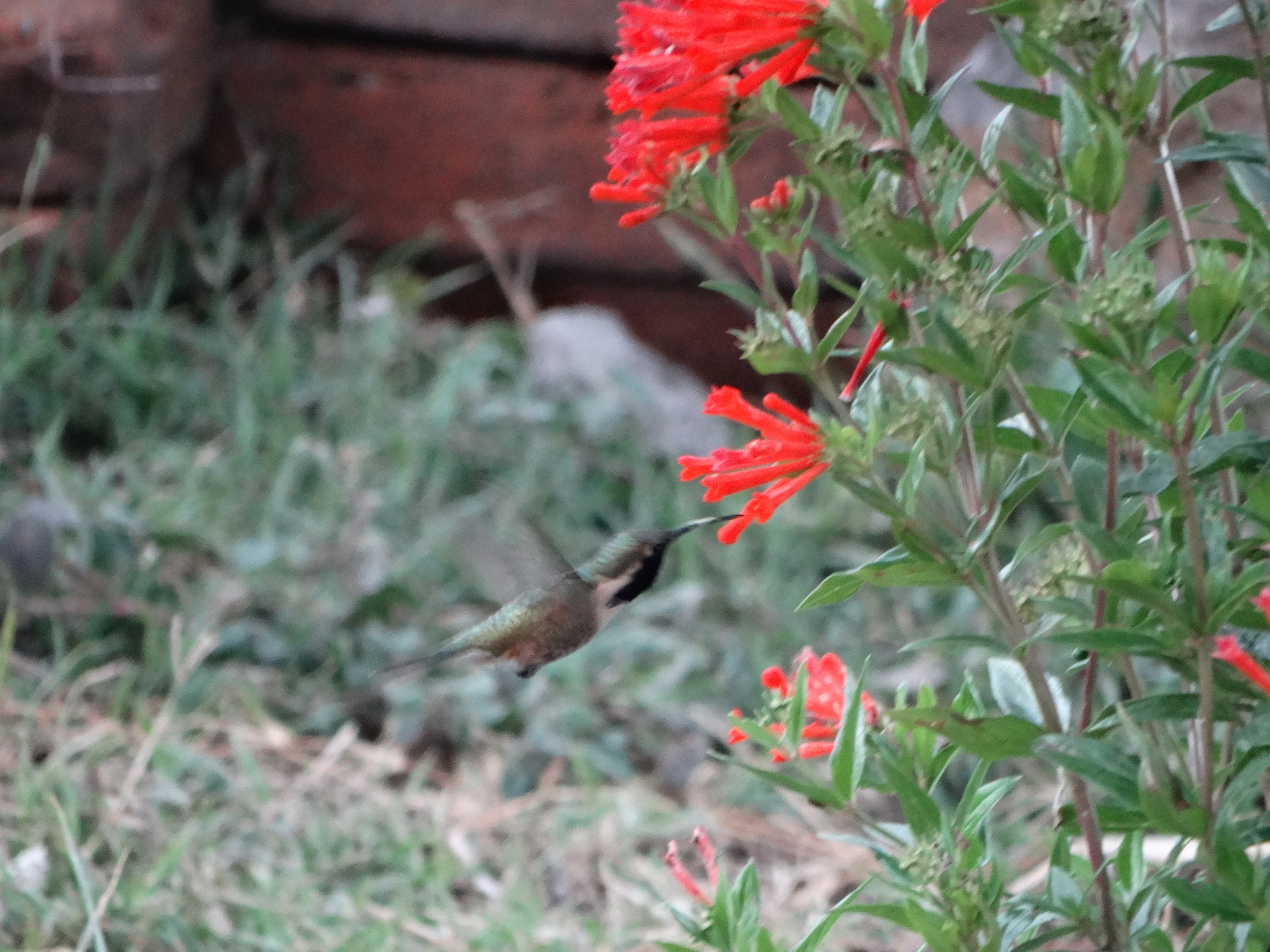
Male feeding on firecrackerbush

== Breeding and behavior ==
During courtship, males attract females by hovering high above the female, then dive with the wings or tail making a snap sound, then flying away with the tail feathers forked and making a different series of snapping sounds. The display lasts 30 to 45 seconds and may repeat several times an hour.

Females build nests on desert shrubs or cacti on steep, dry, rocky slopes, typically 2–10 feet (0.61–3.05 m) above ground, sometimes on top of a previous nest.

The female lays two white eggs in the small cup-like nest, having one or two broods per season. The egg incubation duration is about 15 days, and the chicks nest for about 23 days.

== Status ==
A locally common species in its range, the lucifer sheartail is evaluated as stable and Least Concern on the IUCN Red List of Threatened Species.

== Gallery ==
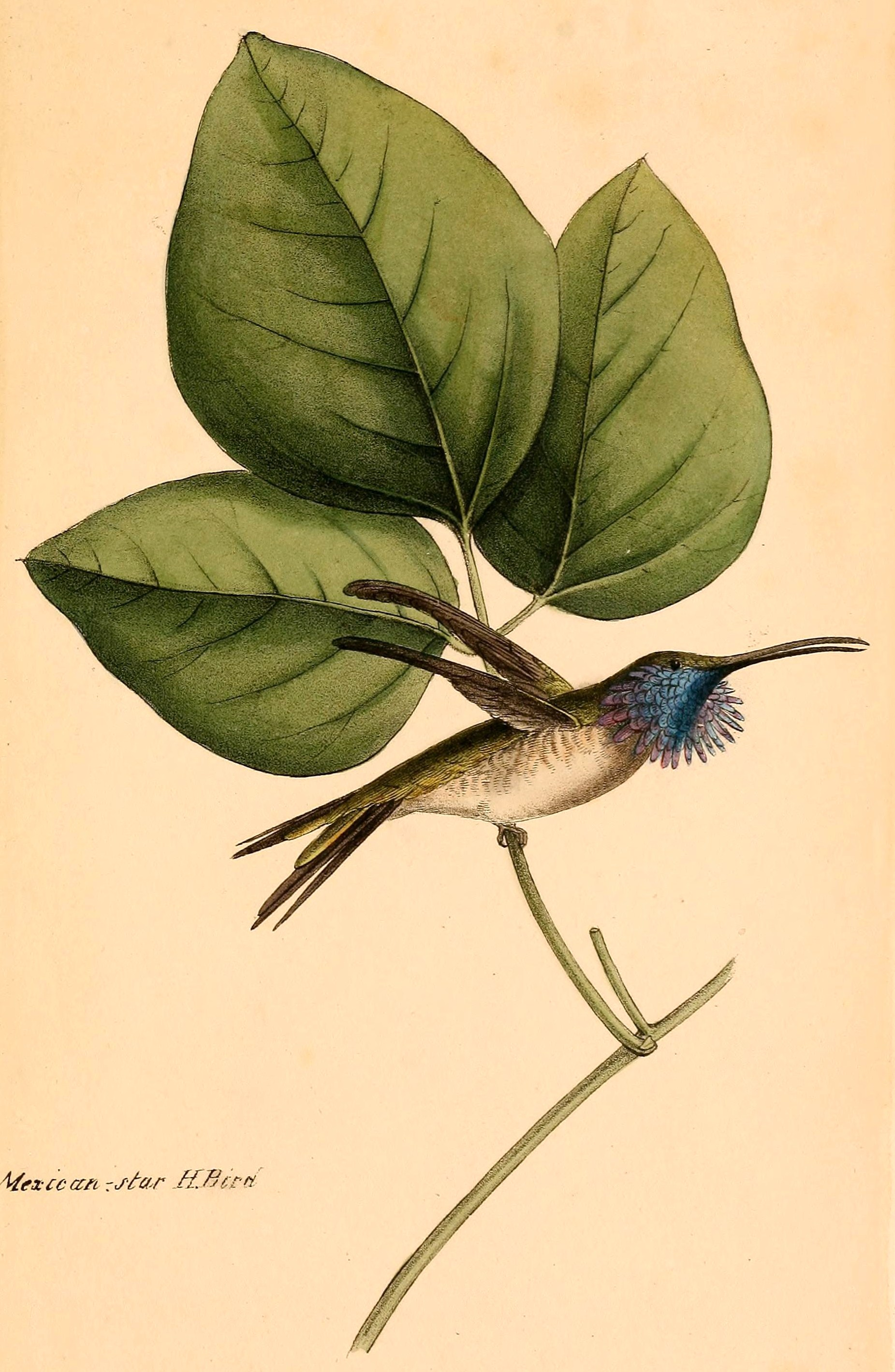
Painting of a male with flared gorget feathers by William Swainson (1789–1855)

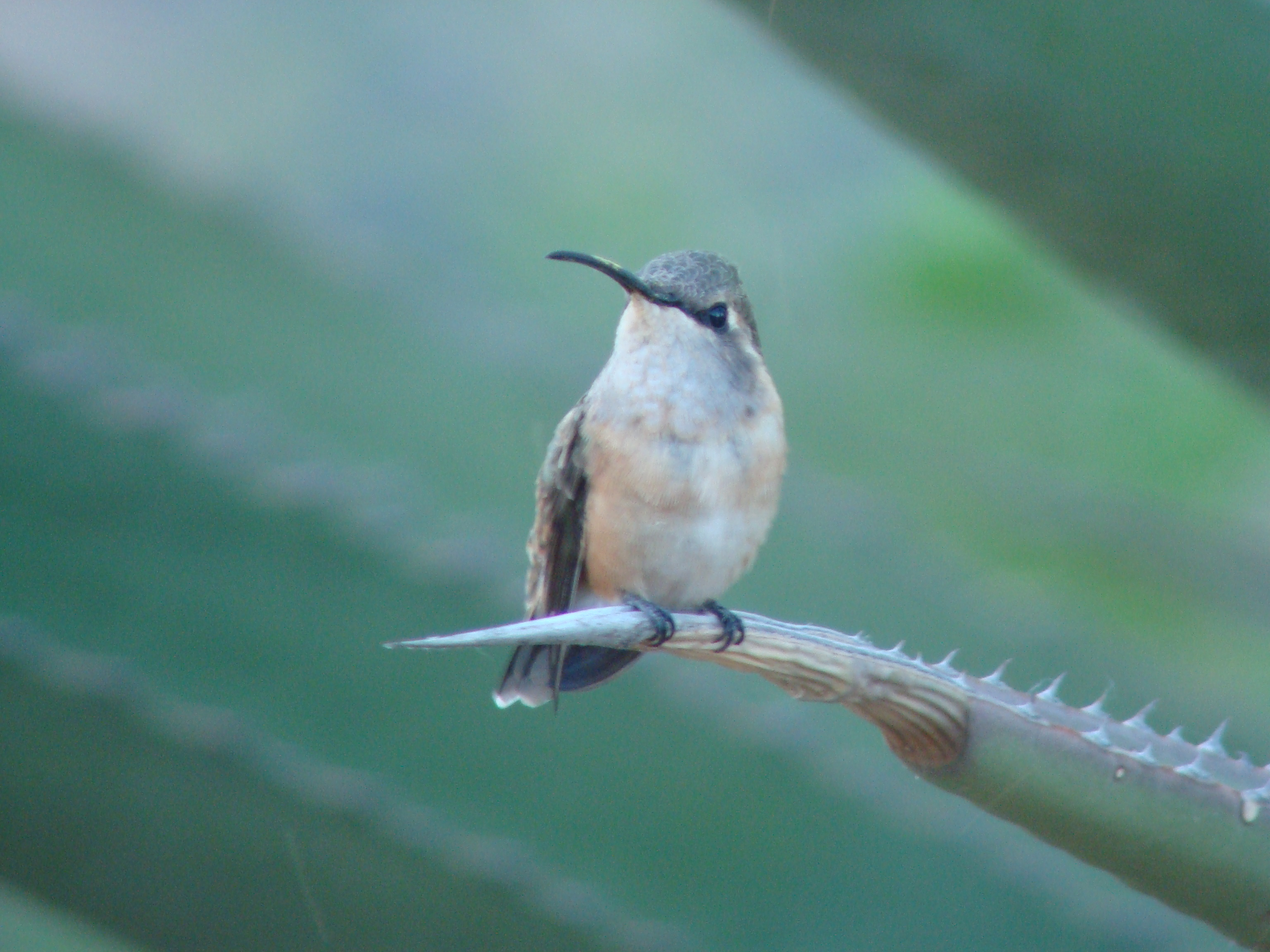
Female

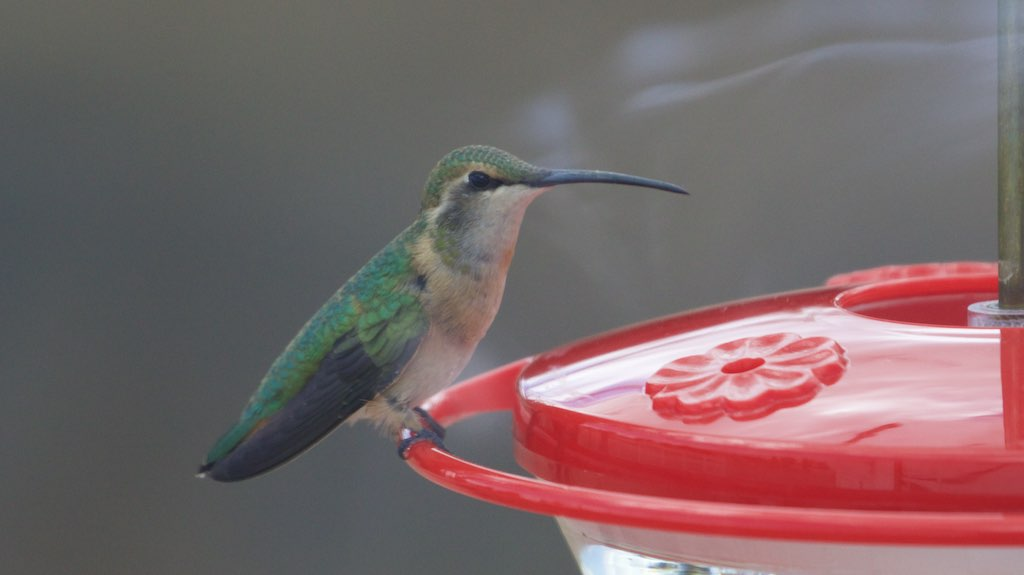
Female at feeder; curved beak

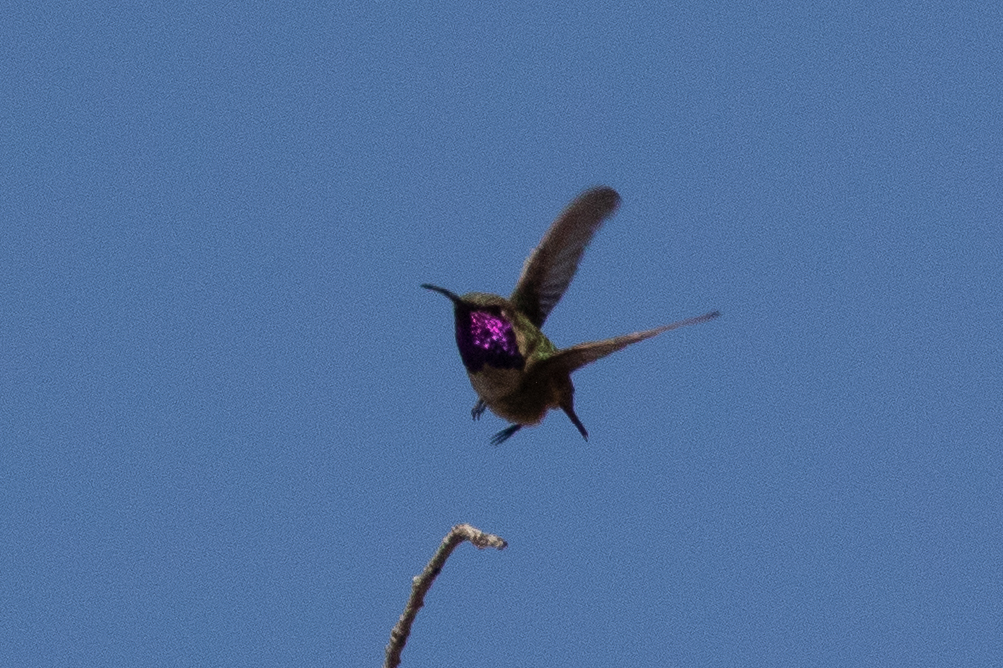
Male in flight showing iridescent gorget
