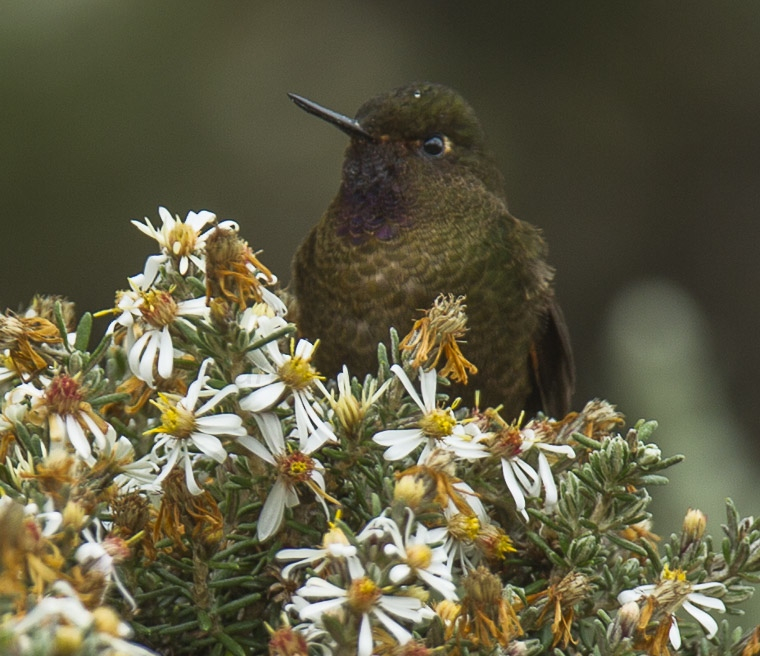

Conservation status
- Vulnerable (IUCN 3.1)
- CITES Appendix II

Scientific classification
- Kingdom: Animalia
- Phylum: Chordata
- Class: Aves
- Clade: Strisores
- Order: Apodiformes
- Family: Trochilidae
- Genus: Metallura
- Species: M. baroni

Binomial name
- Metallura baroni Salvin, 1893

= Violet-throated metaltail =

Species of hummingbird

The violet-throated metaltail (Metallura baroni), locally called metalura gorjivioleta, is an Endangered species of hummingbird in the "coquettes", tribe Lesbiini of subfamily Lesbiinae. It is endemic to Ecuador.

== Taxonomy and systematics ==
The violet-throated metaltail is monotypic. At one time it was treated as a subspecies of what is now the fiery-throated metaltail (Metallura odomae). The species name commemorates the collector Oscar Theodor Brown.

== Description ==
The violet-throated metaltail is 10 to 11 cm (3.9 to 4.3 in) long. Males weigh 4.3 to 4.5 g (0.15 to 0.16 oz) and females 3.9 to 5 g (0.14 to 0.18 oz). It has a medium length, straight, black bill. The adult male has dark olive green upper- and underparts. Its gorget is purple-violet. Its slightly forked tail is iridescent violaceous sky blue on its upper side and glittering yellow-green on its underside. The adult female's upperparts are also dark olive green. Its throat is a duller version of the male's and its breast, and belly are whitish gray spotted with olive green. Its outer tail feathers have whitish tips on their underside. Juveniles are similar to adult females.

== Distribution and habitat ==
The violet-throated metaltail is found only on the Cajas Plateau west of the city of Cuenca, Ecuador. The plateau straddles the border of Azuay and Cañar provinces. It inhabits the edges of elfin forest and Polylepis woodlands and adjacent páramo grasslands. Its favored landscape is characterized by boulders with a cover of bromeliads, Ericaceae, and ferns and mosses. In elevation it normally ranges between 3,000 and 3,900 m (9,800 and 12,800 ft) but was once reported as low as 1,900 m (6,200 ft).

== Behavior ==
=== Movement ===
The violet-throated metaltail's movements, if any, have not been documented, but some seasonal elevational movement is thought possible.

=== Feeding ===
The violet-throated metaltail forages for nectar by hovering; it feeds on a variety of flowering vegetation at any level of its habitat. Males defend feeding territories.

=== Breeding ===
The violet-throated metaltail is thought to nest between November and February. One nest was described as resembling a slipper without a heel; it was made of moss, twigs, and wool. The female incubates the clutch of two white eggs; the incubation and nestling periods are not known.

=== Vocalization ===
A violet-throated metaltail vocalization has been described as "a descending series of 3–5 squeaky notes, followed by several jumbled ones, 'trsee-seee-seee-sew..trr-tsee-tse-tsew..trr-tsee-tse-tsew'." It is thought to be either a song or a chasing call.

== Status ==
The IUCN originally assessed the violet-throated metaltail as Threatened. The assessment was changed to Vulnerable in 1994 and to Endangered in 2000. As of 2023, it has been downlisted to Vulnerable again. Its population is estimated at between 1,000 – 2,500 mature individuals and is believed to be decreasing. Its range includes El Cajas National Park and the small adjoining Río Mazán reserve. However, outside those areas and even within the national park its habitat is under threat by burning to create pasture.
