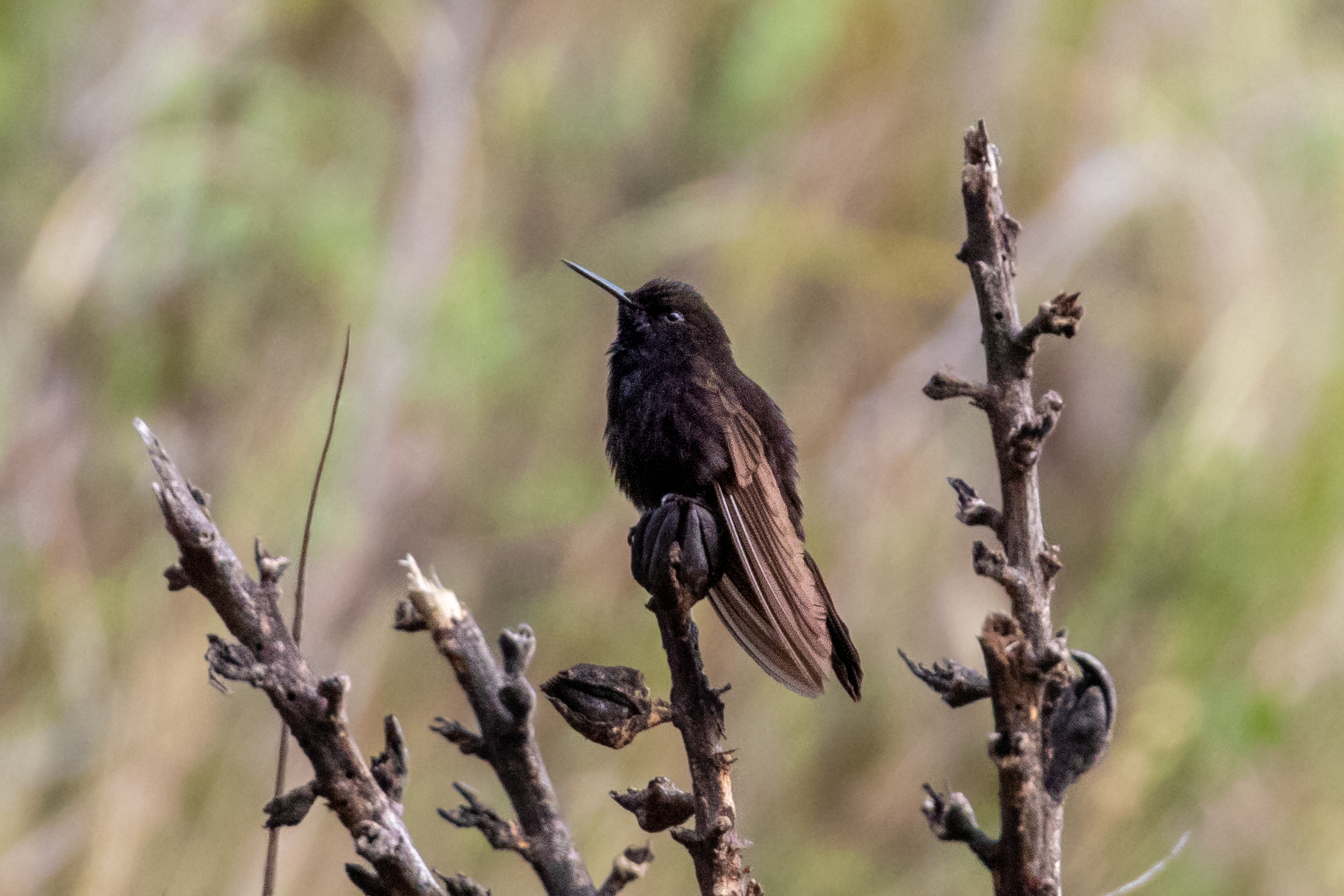
- A black metaltail in Cajamarca, Peru on January 28, 2021

Conservation status
- Least Concern (IUCN 3.1)
- CITES Appendix II

Scientific classification
- Kingdom: Animalia
- Phylum: Chordata
- Class: Aves
- Order: Apodiformes
- Family: Trochilidae
- Genus: Metallura
- Species: M. phoebe

Binomial name
- Metallura phoebe (Lesson & Delattre, 1839)

Synonyms
- Ornismya phoebe (protonym); Ornismya cupreicauda

= Black metaltail =

Species of hummingbird

The black metaltail (Metallura phoebe) is a species of hummingbird in the "coquettes", tribe Lesbiini of subfamily Lesbiinae. It is endemic to Peru.

== Taxonomy and systematics ==
The black metaltail is monotypic. Slight differences between populations in the north and south of its range have led to speculation that it might have two subspecies. It appears to be sister to the other species of the genus Metallura.

== Description ==
The black metaltail is 11.5 to 12.5 cm (4.5 to 4.9 in) long and weighs about 6 g (0.21 oz). It has a medium length, straight, black bill. The adult male is overall black with a purplish or rosy gray sheen. Its slightly forked tail is iridescent bronzy gold and rosy gray on its upper side and glittering golden-orange on its underside. It has a conspicuous white spot behind the eye and its gorget is glittering turquoise green. The adult female is overall dark smoky gray with a smaller gorget than the male. Juveniles are similar to the female but without a gorget.

== Distribution and habitat ==
The black metaltail is found on the western slope of the Peruvian Andes from southern Cajamarca Department south almost to the Chilean border. It also occurs in some valleys within the Andes. Its range might extend into Chile though as of 2022 there are no records there. It inhabits montane scrublands, woodlands, and canyons, especially those with Polylepis and Puya. In elevation it ranges between 1,500 and 4,500 m (4,900 and 14,800 ft) and is most common above 2,700 m (8,900 ft).

== Behavior ==
=== Movement ===
The black metaltail is believed to be sedentary but some seasonal elevational movement is possible.

=== Feeding ===
The black metaltail feeds on nectar from a wide variety of low flowers and flowering bushes, shrubs, and trees. It also eats small insects. It usually takes nectar while hovering but will also cling to flowers and sometimes "rob" nectar by piercing the base of a flower. Males defend feeding territories.

=== Breeding ===
The black metaltail's egg-laying season is thought to span from July to January. Three nests have been described; they were cups made of moss and lined with feathers. One was on a steep mossy bank and the other two were built into the bases of unused nests of other bird species, perhaps a canastero of genus Asthenes. The female alone incubates the clutch of two eggs. The incubation period and time to fledging are not known.

=== Vocalization ===
What is thought to be the black metaltail's song is "a repeated high-pitched single note, tsee.....tsee.....tsee...". Its presumed chase call is "a descending series of 4–6 high-pitched notes reminiscent of a Picumnus piculet". It also makes a repeated "short dry trill; djrrt...and longer dry chatters."

== Status ==
The IUCN has assessed the black metaltail as being of Least Concern. Its population size is not known and is believed to be decreasing. It is fairly common in many areas and is found in some protected areas. However, its habitat is under significant human pressure.
