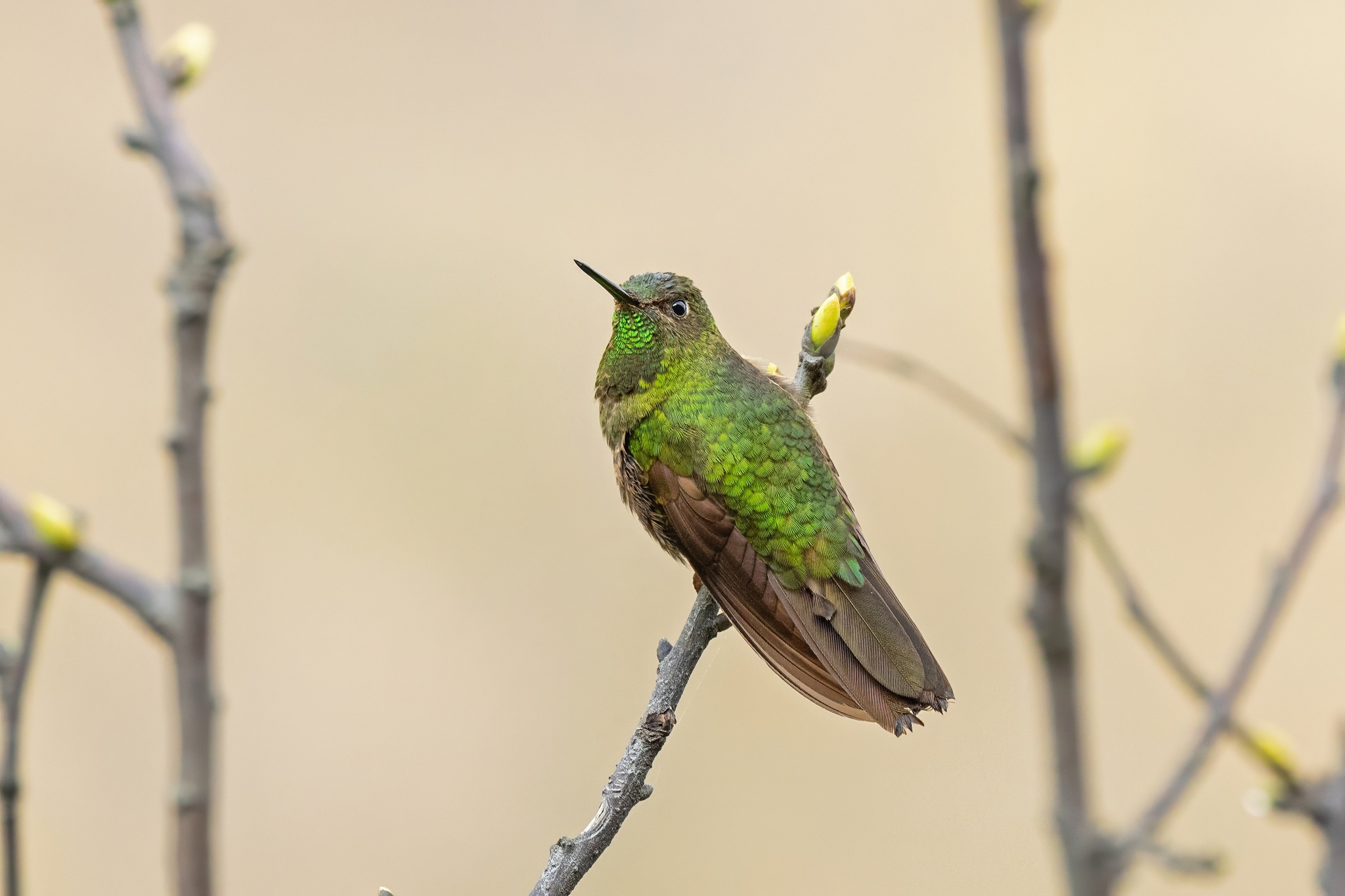

Conservation status
- Least Concern (IUCN 3.1)
- CITES Appendix II

Scientific classification
- Kingdom: Animalia
- Phylum: Chordata
- Class: Aves
- Order: Apodiformes
- Family: Trochilidae
- Genus: Metallura
- Species: M. aeneocauda

Binomial name
- Metallura aeneocauda (Gould, 1846)

= Scaled metaltail =

Species of hummingbird

The scaled metaltail (Metallura aeneocauda) is a species of hummingbird in the "coquettes", tribe Lesbiini of subfamily Lesbiinae. It is found in Bolivia and Peru.

== Taxonomy and systematics ==
The scaled metaltail has two subspecies, the nominate M. a. aeneocauda and M. a. malagae. The latter was for a time treated as a separate species.

== Description ==
The scaled metaltail is 12 to 13 cm (4.7 to 5.1 in) long and weighs 5.2 to 5.4 g (0.18 to 0.19 oz). It has a medium length, straight, black bill. The adult male of the nominate subspecies has bottle green upperparts. Its slightly forked tail is iridescent sky blue with bronzy green tones on its upper side and glittering green on its underside. Its gorget is iridescent bright green. The rest of its underparts are green with a scaly appearance from tan feather margins. The adult female is similar to the male. Its gorget is smaller and its undersides are more mottled. Juveniles are similar to the female. Subspecies M. a. malagae is similar to the nominate but the upper side of its tail is bronzy red and the underside red. It also has a longer bill.

== Distribution and habitat ==
The nominate subspecies of scaled metaltail is found on the eastern slope of the Andes from the Cordillera Vilcabamba of southeastern Peru south into northwestern Bolivia's La Paz Department. M. a. malagae is found in the vicinity of Inkachaka in central Bolivia's Cochabamba Department. The species inhabits glades and edges of cloudforest and elfin forest and also rocky slopes with herbs and shrubs. In elevation it ranges between 2,500 and 3,600 m (8,200 and 11,800 ft) and is most common above 3,000 m (9,800 ft).

== Behavior ==
=== Movement ===
The scaled metaltail is believed to be sedentary but some dispersal into páramo and lower montane forest is thought possible.

=== Feeding ===
The scaled metaltail feeds on nectar from a variety of flowering plants and shrubs, often by clinging to the flower. Males defend feeding territories. In addition to nectar, it feeds extensively on insects.

=== Breeding ===
The scaled metaltail's breeding phenology and nest have not been documented. Its breeding season appears to include May and June.

=== Vocalization ===
The scaled metaltail's chase call is "a descending series of 3–6 squeaky notes, followed by a repeated, buzzy, jumbled phrase, 'trt-tsee-seee-seee-sew..trr-tsee-tsew..trr-tsee-tsew..'."

== Status ==
The IUCN has assessed the scaled metaltail as being of Least Concern. Its population size is not known and is believed to be decreasing. It is "not at risk at present, due to its fairly wide distribution and its rather unspecialized ecology...[but] may be vulnerable in places because [of] regular grassland burning". It occurs in a protected area in each country.
