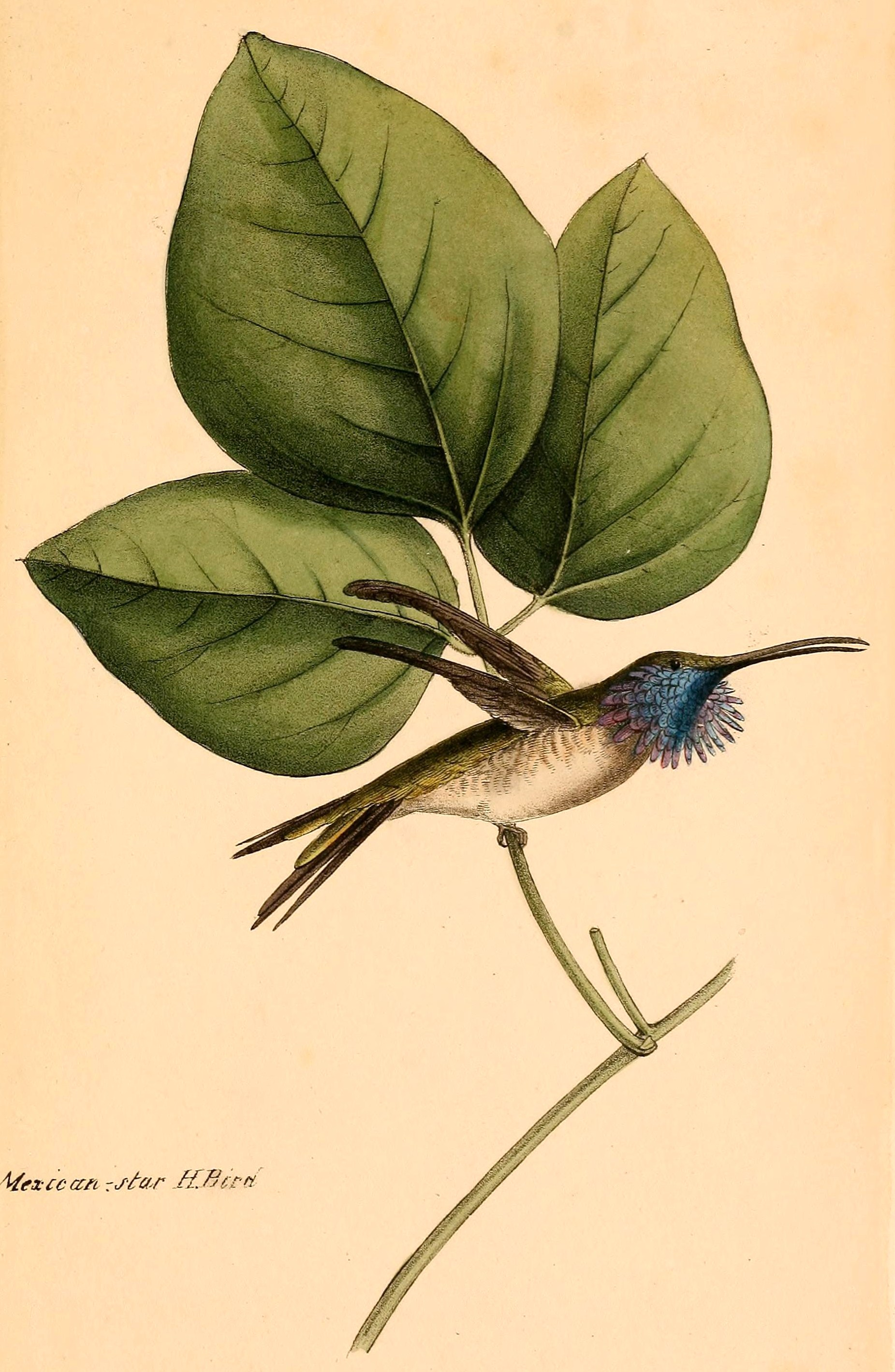
- Lucifer sheartail, Calothorax lucifer

Scientific classification
- Kingdom: Animalia
- Phylum: Chordata
- Class: Aves
- Order: Apodiformes
- Family: Trochilidae
- Tribe: Mellisugini
- Genus: Calothorax; G.R. Gray, 1840

Type species
- Ornisma cyanopogon = Cynanthus lucifer Lesson, 1829

= Calothorax =

Genus of birds

Calothorax is a genus of birds in the hummingbird family Trochilidae.

== Taxonomy ==
The genus Calothorax was introduced in 1840 by the English zoologist George Robert Gray with the lucifer sheartail as the type species. The name combines the Ancient Greek kalos meaning "beautiful" with thōrax meaning "breast".

A 2014 molecular phylogenetic study by Jimmy McGuire and collaborators found that the genus Calothorax was sister to the genus Doricha.

The genus contains two species:

Male	Female	Common name	Scientific name	Distribution
		Lucifer sheartail	Calothorax lucifer	
		Beautiful sheartail	Calothorax pulcher	
