= Neblina metaltail =

Conservation status
- Least Concern (IUCN 3.1)
- CITES Appendix II

Scientific classification
- Kingdom: Animalia
- Phylum: Chordata
- Class: Aves
- Order: Apodiformes
- Family: Trochilidae
- Genus: Metallura
- Species: M. odomae

Binomial name
- Metallura odomae Graves, 1980

Audio
- Recording of the neblina metaltail's calls

Species of hummingbird

The neblina metaltail (Metallura odomae), locally called metalura neblina or colibrí de neblina, is a species of hummingbird in the "coquettes", tribe Lesbiini of subfamily Lesbiinae. It is found in Ecuador and Peru.

== Taxonomy and systematics ==
The neblina metaltail was described in 1980 following expeditions sponsored by Louisiana State University's Museum of Zoology. The species is monotypic.

== Description ==
The neblina metaltail is 9 to 10.5 cm (3.5 to 4.1 in) long. Males weigh about 5.2 g (0.18 oz) and females about 4.8 g (0.17 oz). It has a medium length, straight, black bill. The adult male has iridescent dark green upperparts. Its slightly forked tail is dark olive green on its upper side and shining golden green on its underside. The sides of its head and neck vary from bronzy olive to coppery bronze and its gorget is tomette. The rest of its underparts are olive bronze with a buffy spotted appearance. Its undertail coverts are bronzy green with buffy cinnamon edges. The adult female is a duller version of the male. Its throat is spotted with rosy red and the rest of its underparts are tan with heavy bronzy spotting.

== Distribution and habitat ==
The neblina metaltail is found from the northern part of Podocarpus National Park in Ecuador's Loja Province south to northern Piura and Cajamarca departments in Peru. It inhabits the edges of elfin forest and páramo, moist landscapes characterized by shrubby growth and small trees. ("Neblina" is Spanish for fog or mist.) In elevation it ranges between 2,600 and 3,650 m (8,500 and 12,000 ft) and is most common between 2,900 and 3,400 m (9,500 and 11,200 ft).

== Behavior ==
=== Movement ===
The neblina metaltail is resident throughout its range.

=== Feeding ===
The neblina metaltail feeds mostly on nectar but details of its diet are lacking. Males defend feeding territories. In addition to nectaring, it catches small arthropods by sallies from a perch.

=== Breeding ===
Very little is known about the neblina metaltail's breeding phenology. The only nest was found in August; a female was on it. The nest was a cup made mostly from moss with lichens on the outside placed in a small cavity on a rock face.

=== Vocalization ===
The neblina metaltail's vocalizations have variously been described as "a rather loud seet-seet-seet-ti-tttt...and 'a jerky, wiry chatter'."

== Status ==
The IUCN originally assessed the neblina metaltail as Threatened. The assessment was changed to Near Threatened in 2004 and to the present Least Concern in 2012. Though its population is estimated at fewer than 6700 mature individuals and is believed to be decreasing, much of its range is remote, protected, and not severely fragmented. It is considered fairly common in much of its range but local in Ecuador.
