= Rzepcze =

Rzepcze Repsch
- Village
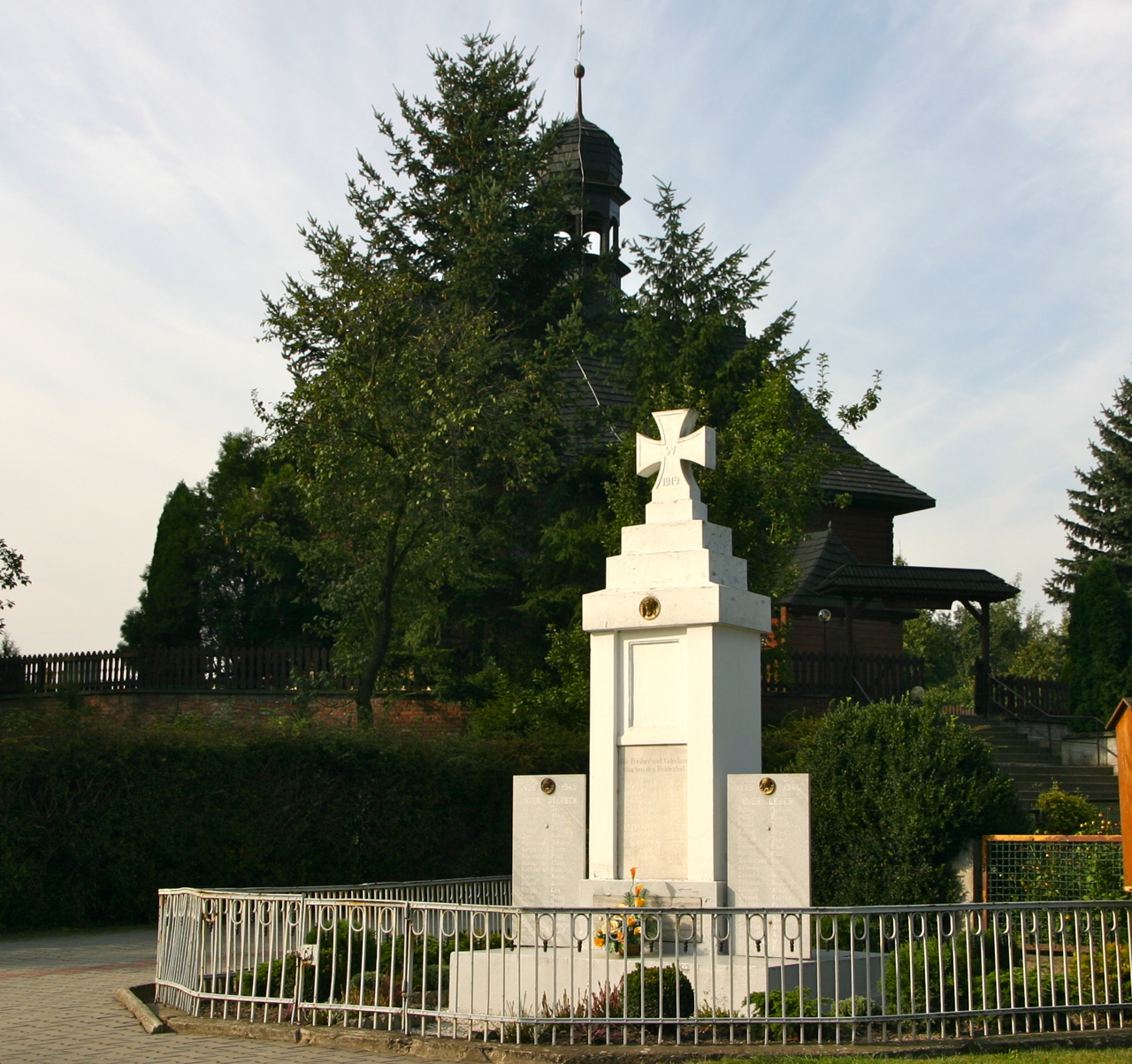
- Catholic church and war memorial

- Location within Poland
- Coordinates: 50°22′57″N 17°52′9″E
- Country: Poland
- Voivodeship: Opole
- County: Prudnik
- Gmina: Głogówek
- First mentioned: 1300
- Time zone: UTC+1 (CET)
  - Summer (DST): UTC+2 (CEST)
- Vehicle registration: OPR

Rzepcze [ˈʐɛpt͡ʂɛ], additional name in German: Repsch, is a village in the administrative district of Gmina Głogówek, within Prudnik County, Opole Voivodeship, in southern Poland, close to the Czech border.

== History ==
A former settlement of the Lusatian culture from the Bronze Age from 900-750 BC, now an archaeological site, is located in Rzepcze.

The earliest record of the village comes from 1300. A church in the village was mentioned in 1447.

== Notable people ==
- Oscar Theodor Baron (1847–1926), engineer, explorer and naturalist

== See also ==
- Prudnik Land
