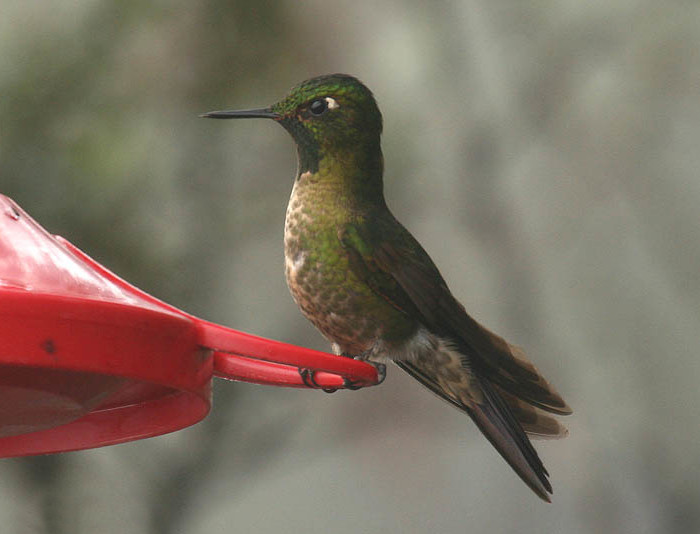
- Tyrian metaltail (Metallura tyrianthina)

Scientific classification
- Kingdom: Animalia
- Phylum: Chordata
- Class: Aves
- Order: Apodiformes
- Family: Trochilidae
- Tribe: Lesbiini
- Genus: Metallura; Gould, 1847

Type species
- Trochilus cupricauda = Ornismya phoebe Gould, 1846

Species
- See text

= Metaltail =

Metaltails

Genus of birds

The metaltails are a group of hummingbirds in the genus Metallura. The species are distributed along the Andes.

== Taxonomy and species list ==
The genus Metallura was introduced by the English ornithologist John Gould in 1847. The type species was subsequently designated as the black metaltail.

The genus contains nine species:

Genus Metallura – Gould, 1847 – nine species
Common name	Scientific name and subspecies	Range	Size and ecology	IUCN status and estimated population
Scaled metaltail	Metallura aeneocauda (Gould, 1846) Two subspecies: M. a. aeneocauda; M. a. malagae	Bolivia and Peru	Size: Habitat: Diet:	LC
Violet-throated metaltail	Metallura baroni Salvin, 1893	Ecuador	Size: Habitat: Diet:	EN
Fiery-throated metaltail	Metallura eupogon (Cabanis, 1874)	Peru	Size: Habitat: Diet:	LC
Perija metaltail	Metallura iracunda Wetmore, 1946	Colombia and Venezuela	Size: Habitat: Diet:	EN
Neblina metaltail	Metallura odomae Graves, 1980	Ecuador and Peru	Size: Habitat: Diet:	LC
Black metaltail	Metallura phoebe (Lesson & Delattre, 1839)	Peru	Size: Habitat: Diet:	LC
Coppery metaltail	Metallura theresiae Simon, 1902 Two subspecies: M. t. theresiae; M. t. parkeri	Peru	Size: Habitat: Diet:	LC
Tyrian metaltail	Metallura tyrianthina (Loddiges, 1832) Seven subspecies: M. t. districta Bangs (1899); M. t. chloropogon Cabanis & Heine (1860); M. t. oreopola Todd (1913); M. t. tyrianthina Loddiges (1832); M. t. quitensis Gould (1861); M. t. septentrionalis Hartert, E. (1899); M. t. smaragdinicollis d'Orbigny & Lafresnaye (1838)	Bolivia, Colombia, Ecuador, Peru, and Venezuela.	Size: Habitat: Diet:	LC
Viridian metaltail	Metallura williami (Delattre & Bourcier, 1846) Four subspecies: M. w. recisa Wetmore, 1970; M. w. williami (Delattre & Bourcier), 1846; M. w. primolina Bourcier, 1853; M. w. atrigularis Salvin, 1893	Colombia and Ecuador	Size: Habitat: Diet:	LC
