= Oscar Theodor Baron =

Silesian engineer, explorer and naturalist

Oscar Theodor Baron (9 September 1847 – 7 September 1926) was a Silesian engineer, explorer and naturalist who collected insect and bird specimens around the world. The lepidopteran genus Baronia is named after him as are several other species from his collections.

== Biography ==
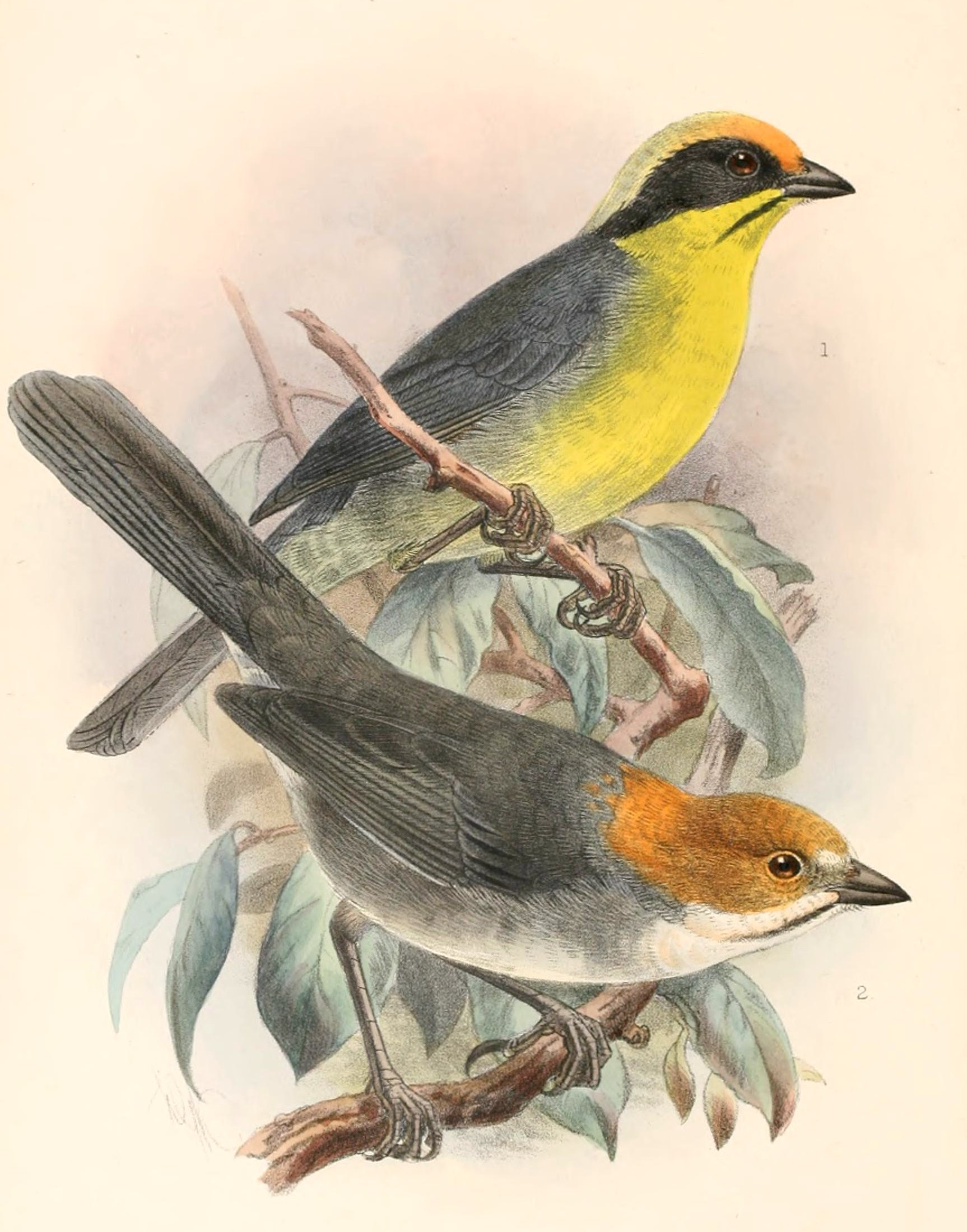
Buarremon baroni (above) named by Salvin in 1895 after Baron

Baron was born in Rzepcze where his father was an elementary school teacher. He was educated at Neustadt and even as a thirteen-year-old he began to collect insects. He then went to work aboard ships to the orient and was shipwrecked off Java. He then made his way to the United States but suffered from scurvy. Reaching California, he began to work as an engineer. According to letters that he wrote to Henry Edwards, he was at Navarro in 1876 and in 1879 he moved to Mendocino. During his travels, he collected insects, sending specimens to Edwards, James Spencer Bailey (1830–1883), Edward Louis Graef (1842–1922), Ferdinand Heinrich Hermann Strecker (1836–1901), Albert Koebele and Berthold Neumoegen (1845–1895). Between 1881 and 1893 he worked with Californian railroad companies. in 1884 he visited Germany and met Otto Staudinger. In 1889 he went on an expedition into South America visiting Guayaquil and Zamora. He collected 11,000 butterflies, 5,000 beetles, and 700 hummingbirds. He also visited Chimborazo before returning to work in California and making another trip to Germany in 1893. His collections of Californian lepidoptera were examined by Hans Hermann Behr. He also sent many of his collections to the California Academy of Sciences. About 1019 hummingbirds were bought from him by Walter Rothschild in 1893 for a sum of £615. Osbert Salvin named Metallura baroni and the genus Baronia in 1893 in his honour. Ernst Hartert named Phaethornis baroni in 1897 after him. Many other species and subspecies across insect and bird groups are named from his collections. He returned to Germany living as a beekeeper at Oberglogau until his death.
