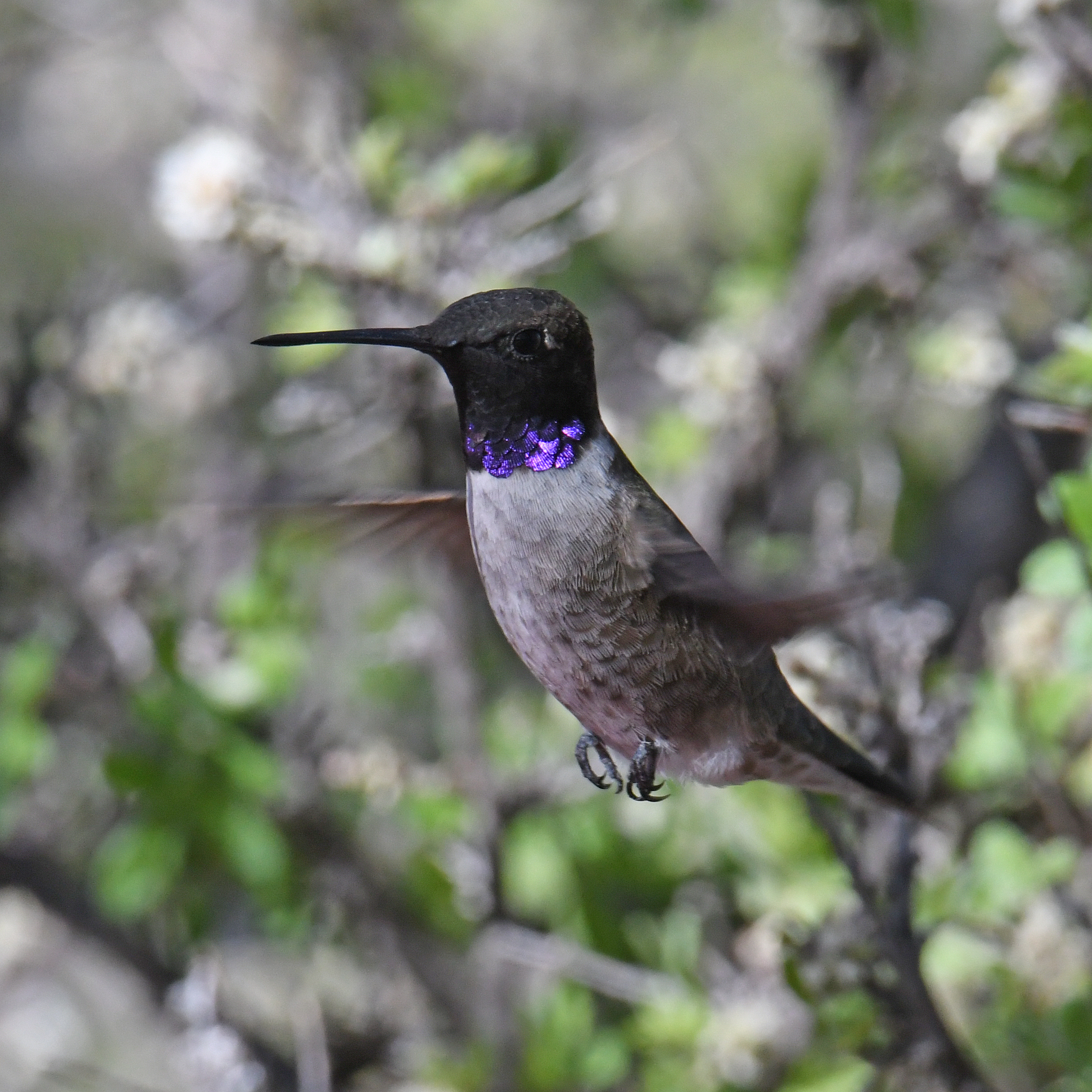
- Male
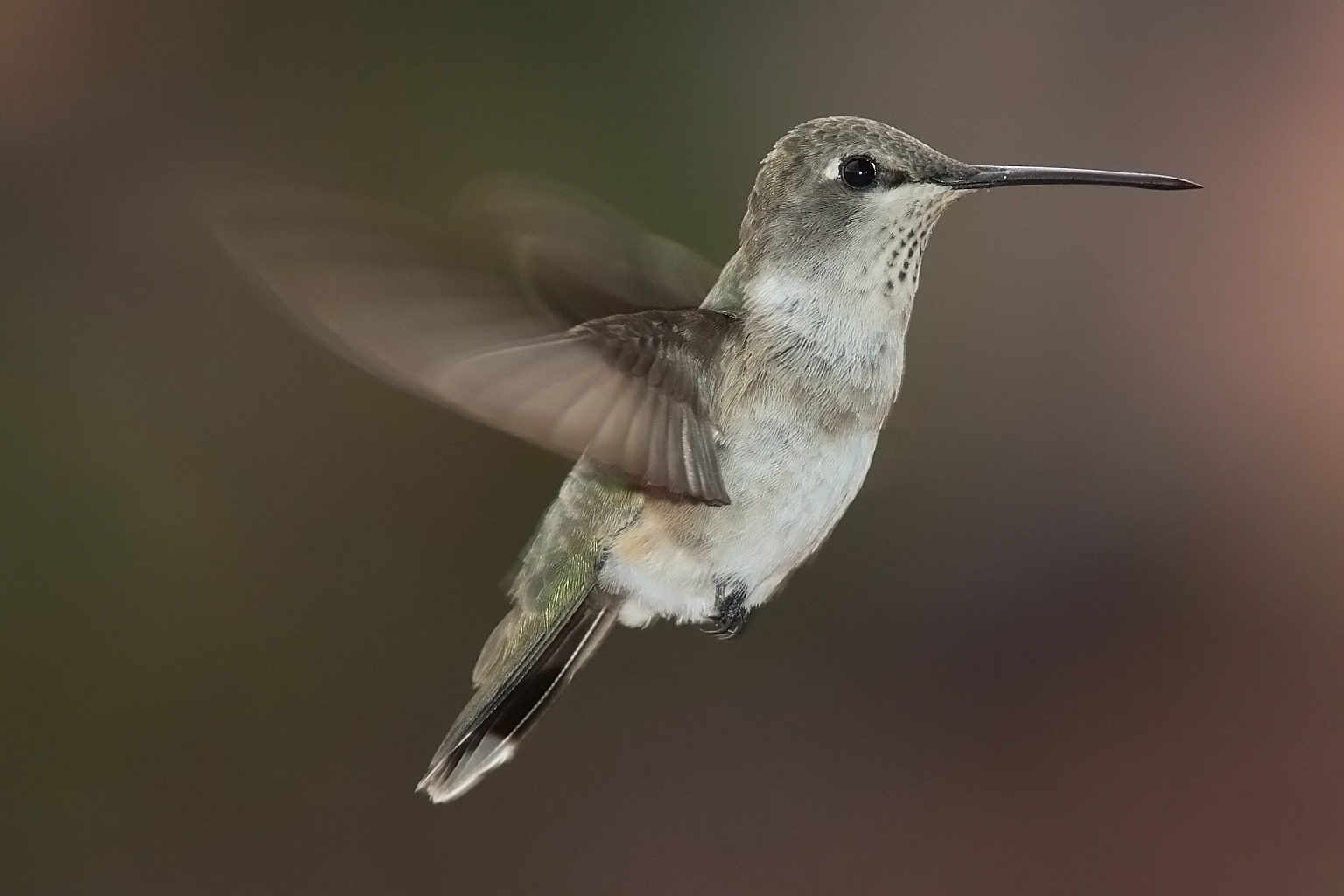
- Female

Conservation status
- Least Concern (IUCN 3.1)
- CITES Appendix II

Scientific classification
- Kingdom: Animalia
- Phylum: Chordata
- Class: Aves
- Order: Apodiformes
- Family: Trochilidae
- Genus: Archilochus
- Species: A. alexandri

Binomial name
- Archilochus alexandri (Bourcier & Mulsant, 1846)
- Breeding range Wintering range

= Black-chinned hummingbird =

Species of bird

Seasonal locations of black-chinned hummingbirds on the west coast

The black-chinned hummingbird (Archilochus alexandri) is an apodiforme bird in the trochilidae family. These birds are found in numerous habitats, including deserts, mountain forests, and some urban areas. The black-chinned hummingbird ranges from southern British Columbia, western United States, and northern Mexico, with most of the northern lying bird migrating down to southern regions after breeding season is over. Male black-chinned hummingbirds are recognizable by the faint iridescent purple gorget on their neck which is only visible in certain lighting. Females have similar features to the ruby-throated hummingbird, making it difficult to tell the two species apart, but often female black-chinned humming birds are larger. When hovering, black-chinned hummingbirds produce a faint low pitched humming sound, but when the male mating dance is displayed, the sounds produced by tail and wing feathers is a higher pitched trill.

== Taxonomy ==
Male Black-chinned Hummingbirds are distinguishable by the iridescent, purple band around their neck, black bill, and white throat. Frequently mistaken for Anna's Hummingbirds, female black-chinned hummingbirds can be told apart by their larger beak, torsos, and heads. The hybrid between the black-chinned hummingbird and Anna's hummingbird is called "Trochilus" violajugulum. The black-chinned hummingbird is also known to hybridize with Anna's, Lucifer, broad-tailed, and Costa's hummingbirds.

== Description ==
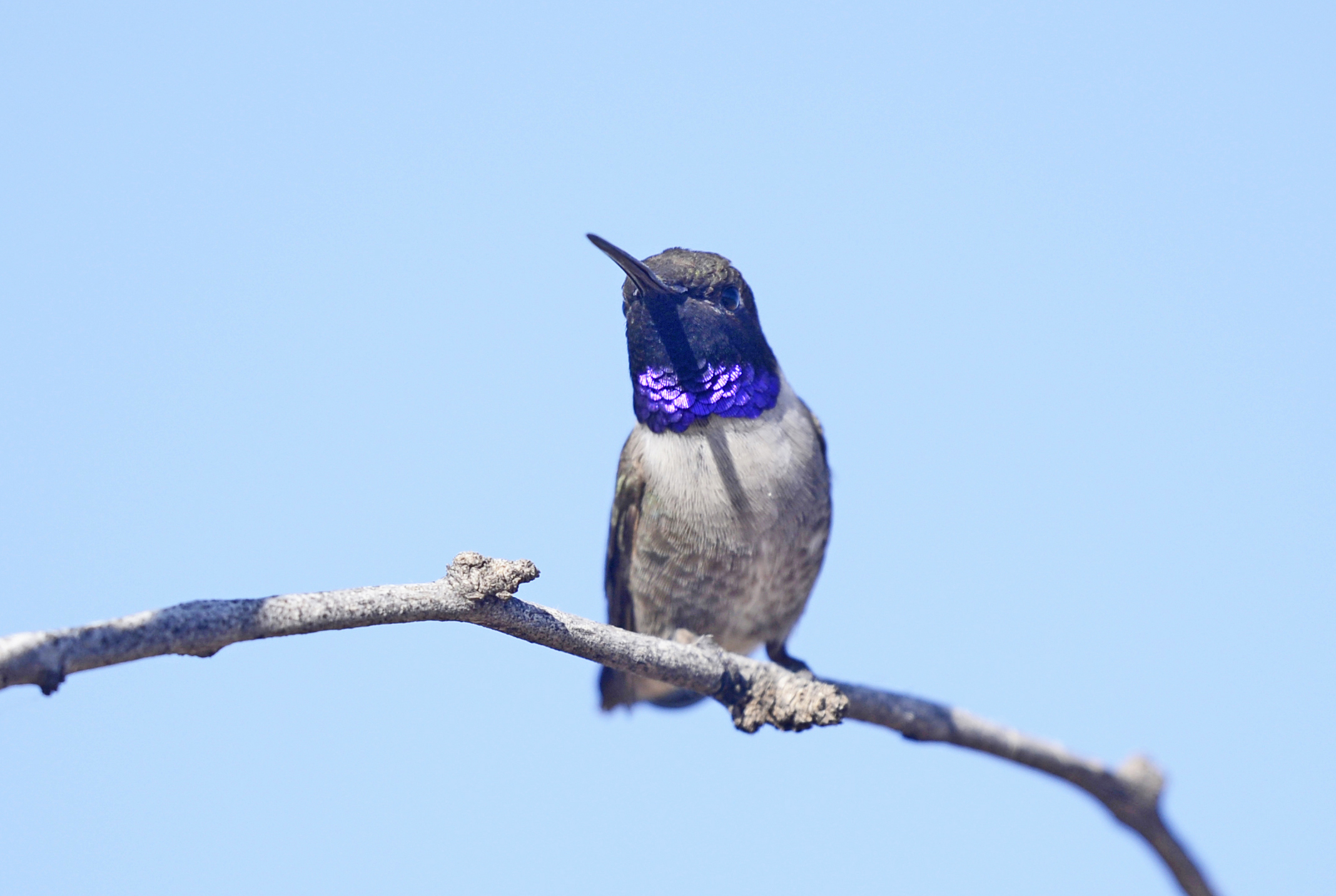
Male

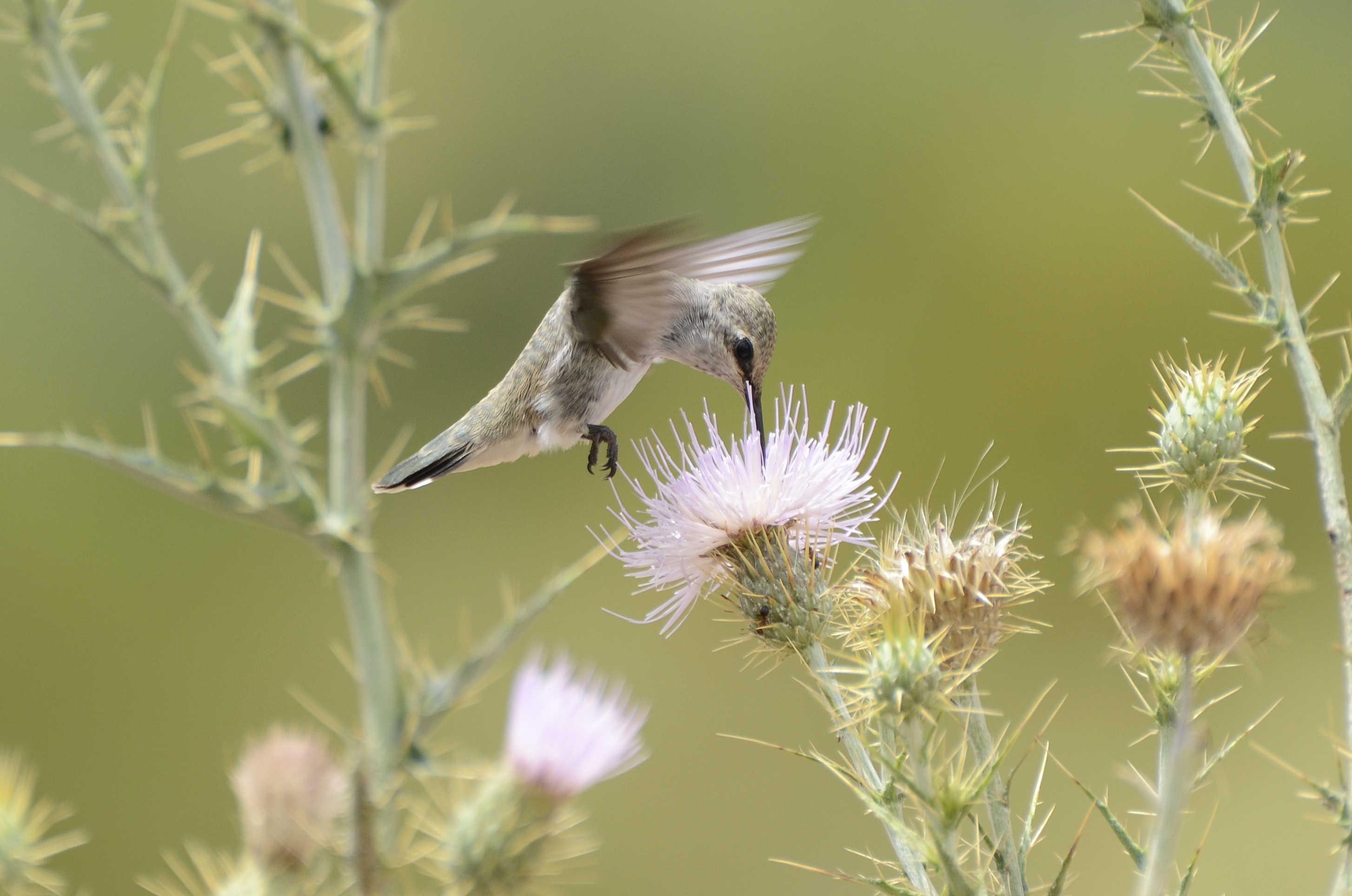
Hovering female

The black-chinned hummingbird is 8.25 cm (3.25 in) long. Adults are metallic green above and white-gray below with green flanks. Their bill is long, straight and slender. The adult male has a black face and chin, a glossy purple gorget (when accurately exposed to sunlight) and a dark forked tail. The female has a dark rounded tail with white tips and no throat patch. Juvenile plumage is similar to that of adult females, but with buff margins on the dorsal feathers. Juvenile males may also possess purple feathers on their throats. Juveniles do not have a forked tail like adults.

Young are born almost featherless, but grow a complete set of feathers within three weeks of hatching. Juveniles begin replacing their feathers in November after migrating for the winter. They have a completely new set of feathers before their first year of age.

Similar species to the black-chinned hummingbird include broad-tailed hummingbird, rufous hummingbird, calliope hummingbird, Allen's hummingbird, lucifer hummingbird, Anna's hummingbird, and Costa's hummingbird.

=== Status ===
This species has been labeled as a least-concern species because of its broad range (236,000 km^{2} (91,120 sq mi)), considerable population size and growth (14.6% increase per decade). Trend maps for black-chinned hummingbirds showed a relatively stable population between 2009 and 2021, albeit with some decline in late years of that decade.

Chirping

=== Vocalization ===
Hummingbirds of the Archilochus genus, such as the Black-chinned Hummingbird and Ruby-throated Hummingbird, communicate through a series of high pitched chirps. Black-chinned Hummingbirds vocalize for foraging, mating, and communicating with offspring. They also use a louder, more high pitched chirp to warn of nearby predators or defend territory. Black-chinned Hummingbirds are also known to produce sonations when displaying courtship dives. These trilling sounds are produced independently from the syrinx, instead coming from the tail and wing feathers.

== Distribution and habitat ==
Black-chinned hummingbirds are found in most of the western United States, reaching north into British Columbia, east to Oklahoma, and as far south as Mexico. They can be found in mountains, woodlands, orchards, meadows, chaparral habitats, and in urban environments. Their breeding habitat is open, semiarid areas, usually near water in the western United States, northern Mexico, and southern British Columbia. They may inhabit moist environments like orchards, shaded canyons, and riparian woods. The males and females of this species use different habitats from one another for breeding territories.

== Behavior and ecology ==
=== Breeding ===
Male Black-chinned hummingbirds will pursue a female until she perches, where he will then perform a series of display dives to capture her attention. To start off courtship, males ascend 10-15 m into the air, before diving in 15-20 m arches repeated for about 20 seconds. As he approaches the female at the bottom of his dive, the male fans out and closes his tail, causing the outer tail feathers to produce a high-pitched trill sound. The Black-chinned Hummingbird share homologous mating displays with Anna's Hummingbirds, where they fly closely around females and create trilling sounds with their tail feathers. In courtship, males perform "pendulum" display, flying back and forth in wide U-shaped arcs, making whirring sounds on each dive. Black-chinned hummingbirds can exhibit territorial behavior around feeders as well as at other small feeding sites, becoming more defensive during breeding season. However, if there are numerous individuals in an area as well as multiple food sources, this species shows less territoriality.

=== Feeding ===
Black-chinned hummingbirds are important pollinators to the regions they occupy. They commonly feed on nectar producing plants, as well as spiders and smaller insects. These hummingbirds can be found feeding on flowers anywhere between the ground level and up in trees, and insects are caught by flying through swarms of bugs or by taking prey off spider webs. Black-chinned hummingbirds are able to get nectar from their tongue to their mouth through capillary action. The tongue is equipped with small grooves that allow the nectar to travel into it's bill when retracting the tongue.

=== Nesting ===
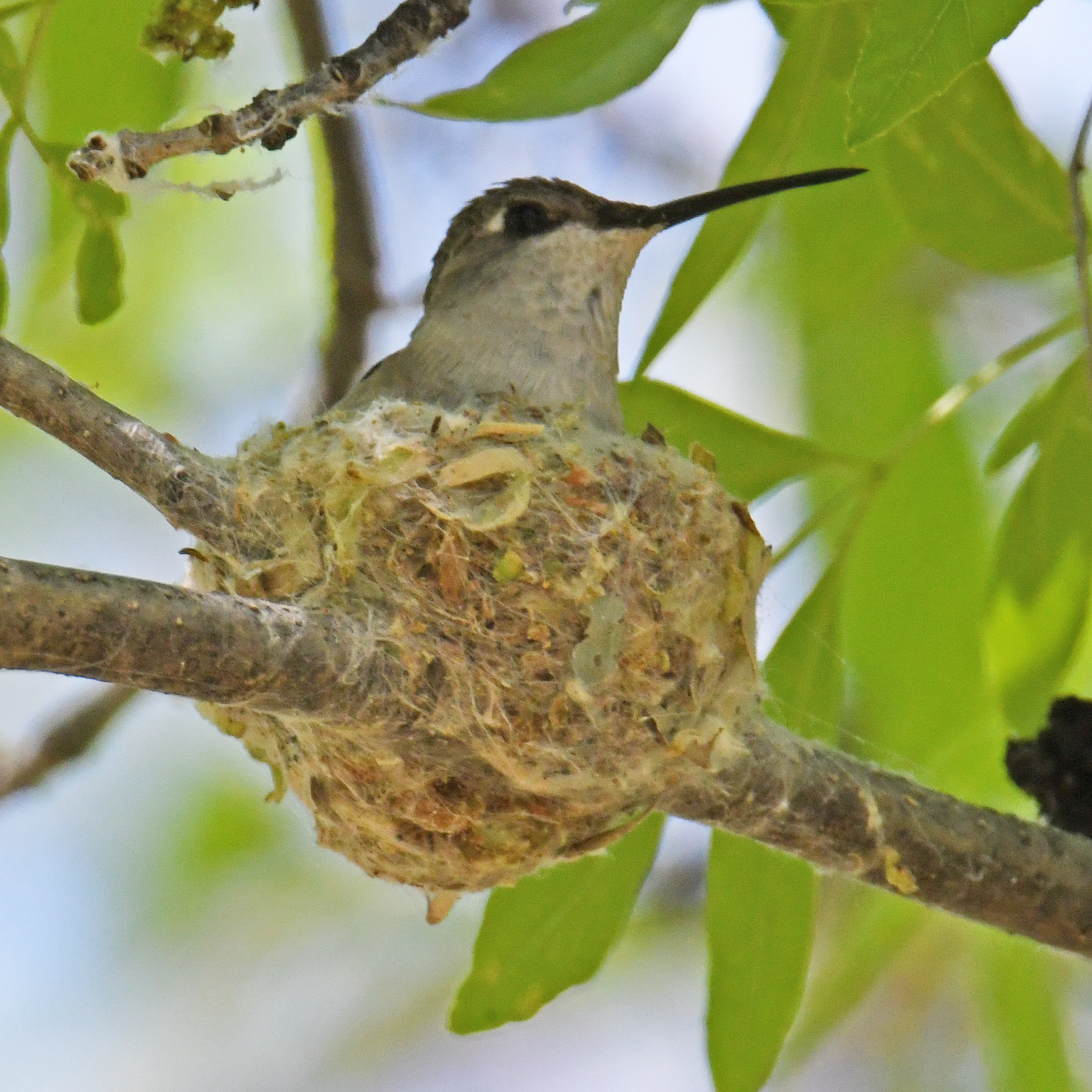
Nesting female

The female builds a well-camouflaged nest in a protected location in a shrub or tree using plant fibers, spider web silk, downy feathers and lichens. Black-chinned hummingbirds prefer to nest 6–12 ft (1.8–3.7 m) above the ground, often on exposed horizontal branches below the canopy. Research also suggests that they may purposefully nest near the active nests of larger, predatory birds, as a means of reducing nest predation; the larger predators do not prey on the hummingbird, but their presence will deter other birds that might be interested in the black-chinned hummingbird's eggs or newly hatched chicks. The female lays two white eggs at a time, each about 8 mm (0.31 in) in diameter, and may breed 2–3 times per year, incubating the eggs for 13–16 days. She feeds the young by inserting her bill deep into their throats and regurgitating insects and nectar. The young fledge at about 20–21 days.
