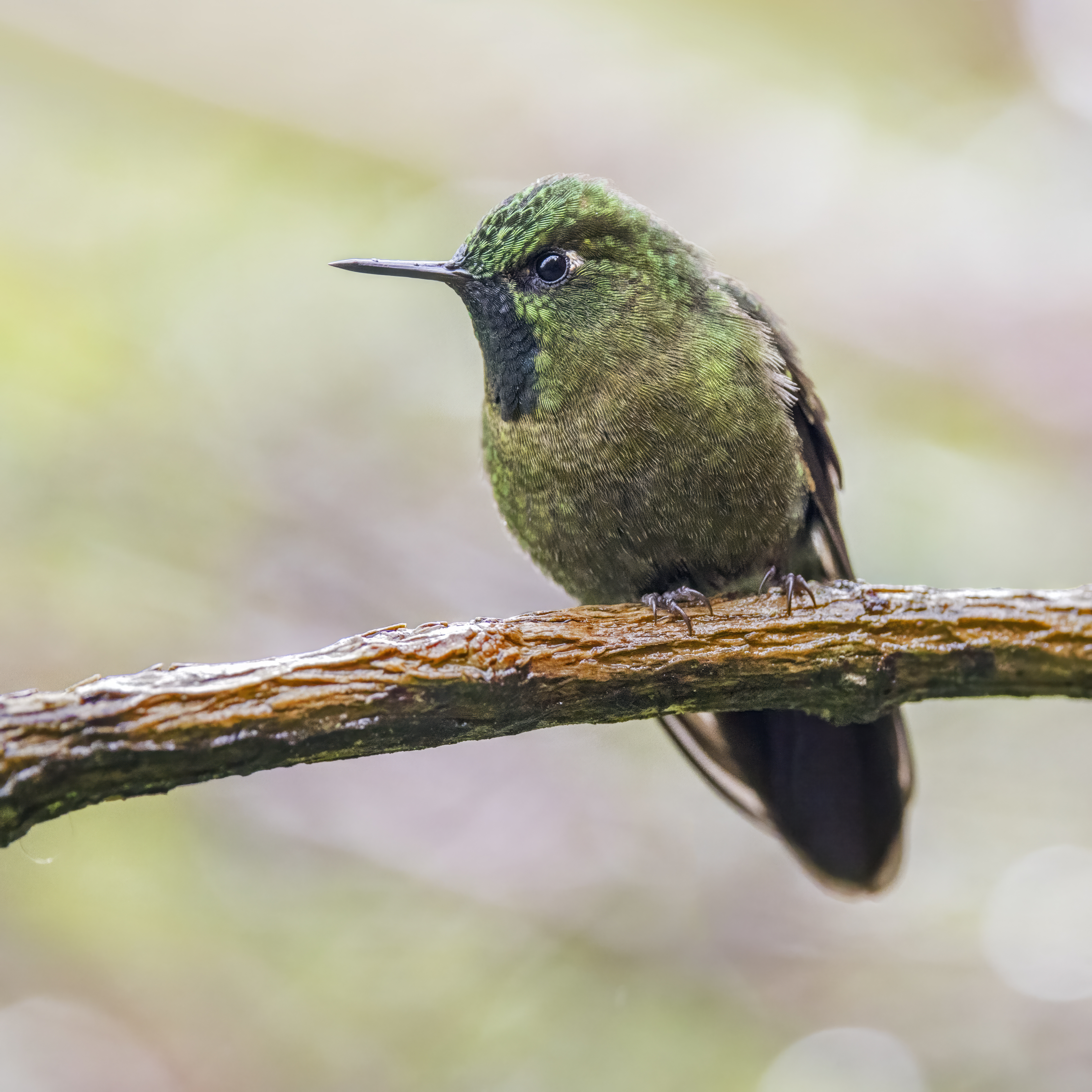
- Metallura tyrianthina tyrianthina, Colombia

Conservation status
- Least Concern (IUCN 3.1)
- CITES Appendix II (CITES)

Scientific classification
- Kingdom: Animalia
- Phylum: Chordata
- Class: Aves
- Clade: Strisores
- Order: Apodiformes
- Family: Trochilidae
- Genus: Metallura
- Species: M. tyrianthina

Binomial name
- Metallura tyrianthina (Loddiges, 1832)
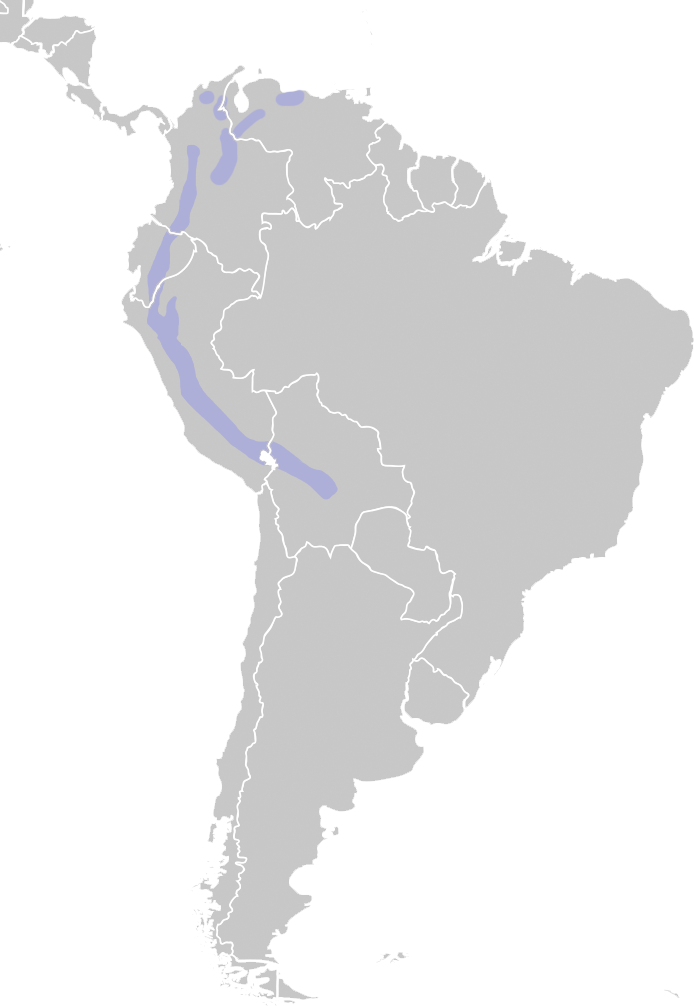

= Tyrian metaltail =

Species of hummingbird

The Tyrian metaltail (Metallura tyrianthina) is a species of hummingbird in the subfamily Lesbiinae, the brilliants and coquettes. It is found in Bolivia, Colombia, Ecuador, Peru, and Venezuela.

== Taxonomy and systematics ==
The Tyrian metaltail has these seven subspecies:

- M. t. districta Bangs (1899)
- M. t. chloropogon Cabanis & Heine (1860)
- M. t. oreopola Todd (1913)
- M. t. tyrianthina Loddiges (1832)
- M. t. quitensis Gould (1861)
- M. t. septentrionalis Hartert, E. (1899)
- M. t. smaragdinicollis d'Orbigny & Lafresnaye (1838)

In the early twentieth century some authors treated M. t. chloropogon and M. t. smaragdinicollis as full species but that treatment has not been widely accepted.

== Description ==
The Tyrian metaltail is 9 to 10 cm (3.5 to 3.9 in) long and weighs 2.7 to 5.1 g (0.10 to 0.18 oz). Both sexes of all subspecies have a short, straight, black bill. The male of the nominate subspecies has bottle green upperparts and gray underparts with pale fringes on the feathers. It has an emerald green throat and a slightly forked glistening bronze tail. The female is also bottle green above. Its throat and upper breast are ochre-orange with olive green spots and the lower breast and belly are whitish with green spots. Its outer tail feathers have whitish tips.

The plumage of the Tyrian metaltail's other subspecies differ from those of the nominate in some significant ways. M. t. districta has a violet tail and the female's underparts are not spotted. Both sexes of M. t. chloropogon have a coppery red tail; the male is otherwise almost completely black and the female has only a few spots on the throat and upper breast. M. t. oreopola's tail is golden red. The male's upperpart feathers have coppery bars near the ends and its underparts are green with pale fringes to the feathers. The female's throat and upper breast have few spots. M. t. quitensis has a longer bill than the nominate and a bronze-olive tail. M. t. septentrionalis's tail is purple-blue with green inclusions and the male's underparts are white with bronze-olive spots. M. t. smaragdinicollis has a violet tail like districta but the female's throat and upper breast are heavily spotted like those of the nominate.

== Distribution and habitat ==
The subspecies of Tyrian metaltail are found thus:

- M. t. districta, northern Colombia's Sierra Nevada de Santa Marta and northwestern Venezuela's Serranía del Perijá
- M. t. chloropogon, the Venezuelan Coastal Range between the states of Aragua and Miranda
- M. t. oreopola, the Andes of Venezuela from southwestern Lara south to northern Táchira
- M. t. tyrianthina, from southern Táchira south through all three Andean chains of Colombia and eastern and southern Ecuador into Piura department in extreme northern Peru
- M. t. quitensis, northwestern Ecuador
- M. t. septentrionalis, the west slope of the Peruvian Andes west of the Marañón River between the departments of Cajamarca and Lima
- M. t. smaragdinicollis, the east slope of the Peruvian Andes from the department of Amazonas south and east across central Bolivia into Santa Cruz department

The Tyrian metaltail inhabits the interior of several humid open landscapes including secondary forest, cloudforest, mossy treeline scrub, and elfin forest. It also occurs at the edges or in brushy parts of páramo. In elevation it ranges from 1,500 to 4,200 m (4,900 to 13,800 ft) but in most areas is most common between 2,500 to 3,300 m (8,200 to 10,800 ft) and in the Venezuelan coastal mountains at about 1,000 m (3,300 ft).

== Behavior ==
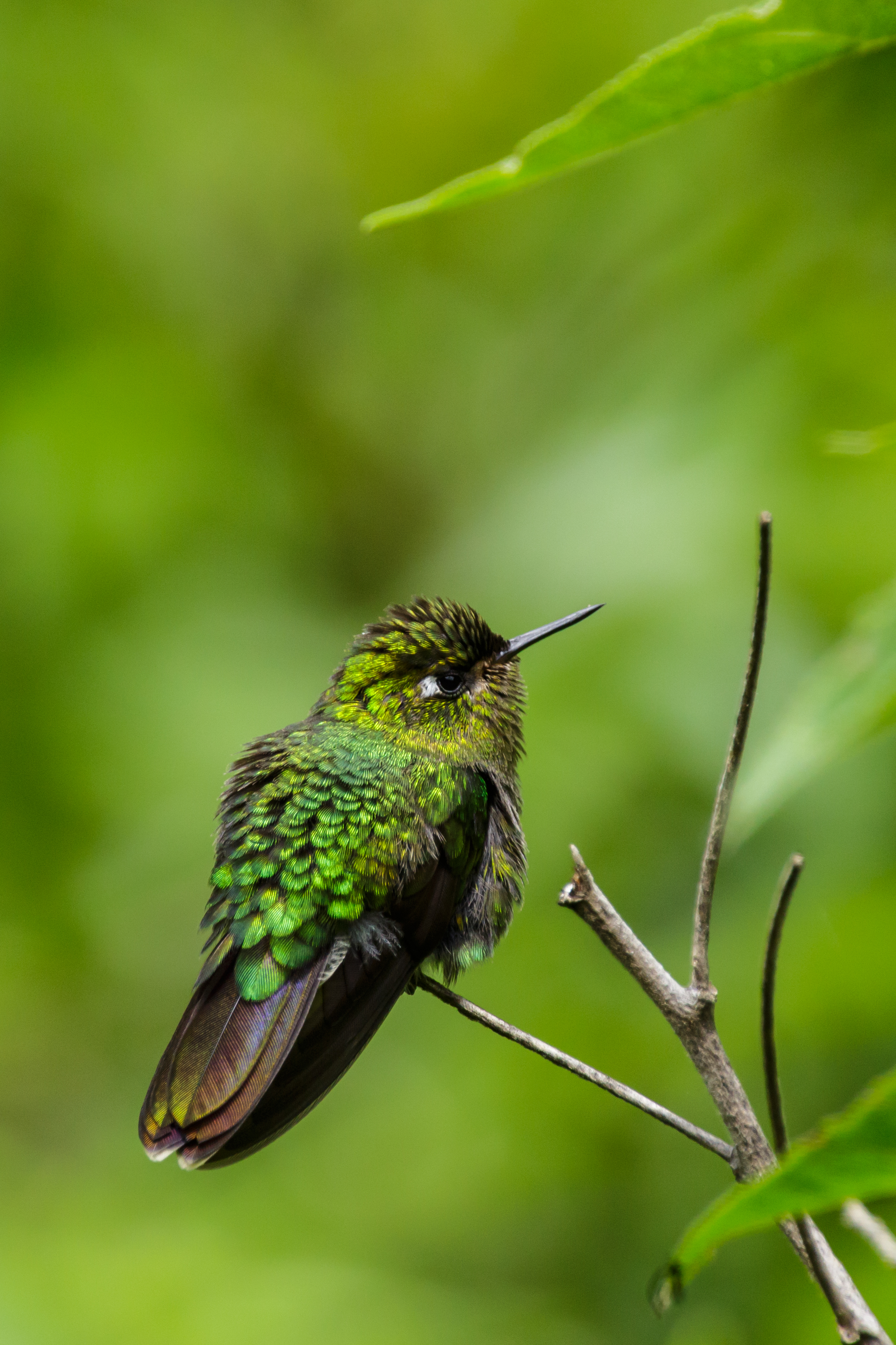
in Peru

=== Movement ===
The Tyrian metaltail makes significant elevational movements between the seasons, even occurring casually as low as 600 m (2,000 ft) in Venezuela.

=== Feeding ===
The Tyrian metaltail forages in the canopy of bushes and medium-sized trees, where males defend territories. It takes nectar from a variety of flowering plants, both by inserting its bill into the corolla while hovering or clinging to it and occasionally by piercing the base of the flower to "rob" nectar. It also feeds on small insects on the wing.

=== Breeding ===
The Tyrian metaltail's breeding seasons vary widely along its north-south distribution. The female alone builds the nest, incubates the eggs, and cares for the young. It first breeds in its second year. The nest is an open cup made of moss, lichens, liverwort, and other plant material. It may be unlined or lined with soft cottony seeds. It is placed in a rocky niche or suspended from roots on an earthen or rocky bank. The clutch size is two eggs.

=== Vocalization ===
The Tyrian metaltail does not sing often; its song is "a repeated series of weak, high-pitched, lispy notes 'seek..sik..see..si..see..sip..see.......see..seek..see..see...'." It more often calls while chasing, "alternating stuttering trills and repeated phrases of squeaky notes 'trr..trr..trr..tsi-see-sew-sew...tsi-see-sew-sew...'". It also makes "a brief rattle and short 'tsit' or 'pit' notes.

== Status ==
The IUCN has assessed the Tyrian metaltail as being of Least Concern. Though its population size is not known, it is believed to be stable. It is common throughout its large range and locally very abundant. It appears "less sensitive to man-induced environmental changes than other Metallura species" and occurs in many protected areas.
