= Gorget (bird) =

Patch of colored feathers on throat

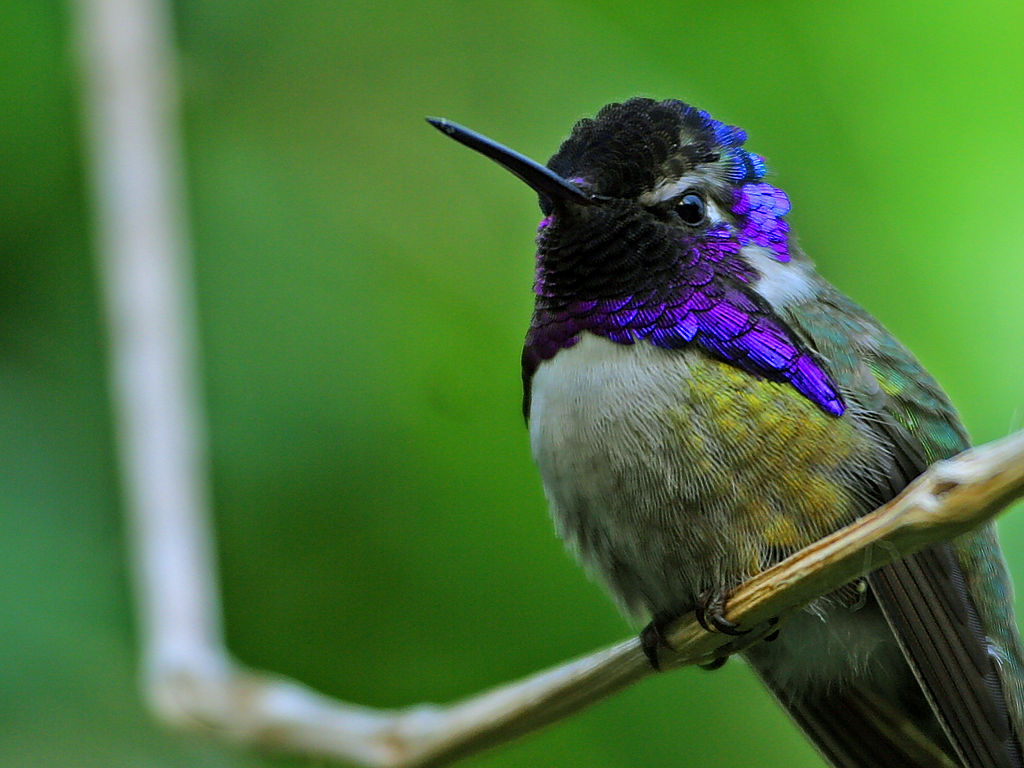
Like many hummingbirds, the male Costa's hummingbird has an iridescent gorget.

A gorget (/ˈɡɔːrdʒɪt/ GOR-jit) is a patch of colored feathers found on the throat or upper breast of some species of birds. It is a feature found on many male hummingbirds, particularly those found in North America; these gorgets are typically iridescent. Other species, such as the purple-throated fruitcrow and chukar partridge, also show the feature. The term is derived from the gorget used in military armor to protect the throat (which is called gorge in French).

Feather wear and exposure to the sun can produce changes in the apparent color of iridescent gorget feathers. For example, fresh gorget feathers on the Anna's hummingbird are rose red; these fade to a coppery bronzy color with age.

== Functions ==
A number of social functions have been suggested for the gorget. It may aid in mate attraction or in resource defense. It may signal social status or allow species to identify conspecifics. Among hummingbirds, gorgets are typically found only on males. In the rare instances where they are found on females, they appear to serve primarily for signaling threats.

Young hummingbirds, which need to intrude on adult territories to feed once they have fledged, all lack gorgets. This may help to make them less visible or less threatening to adult birds.
