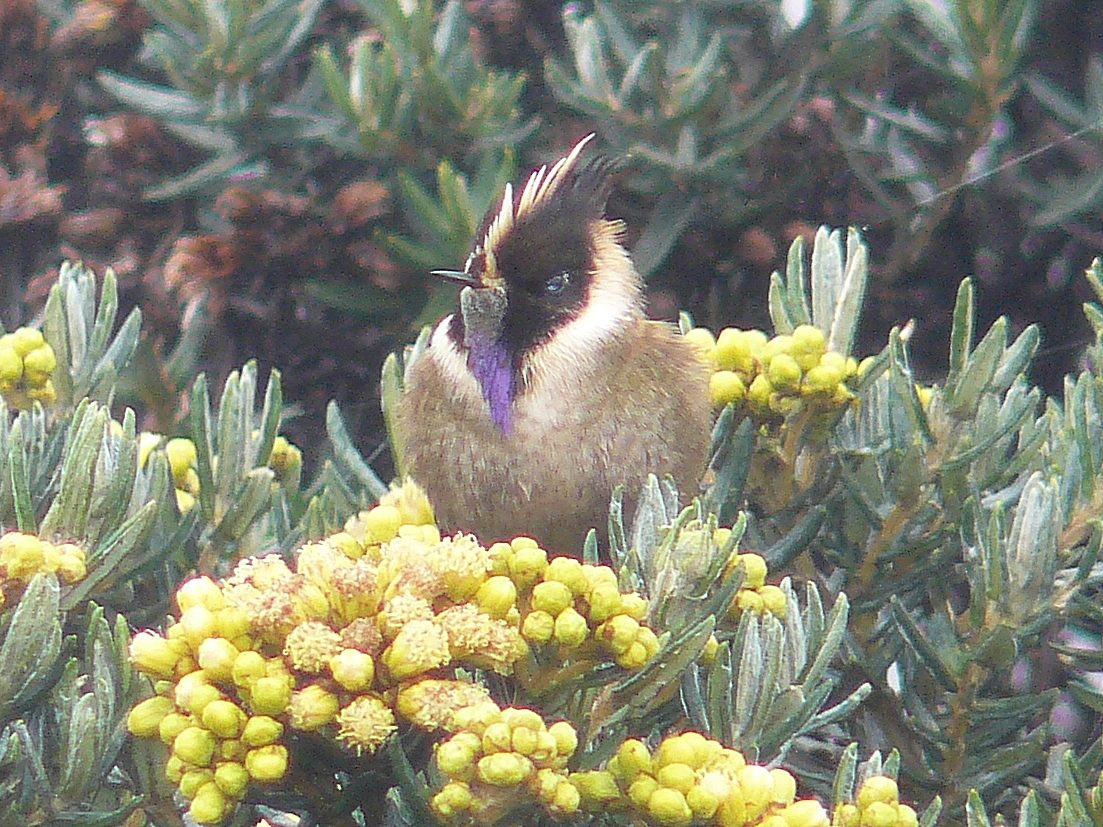

Conservation status
- Vulnerable (IUCN 3.1)
- CITES Appendix II

Scientific classification
- Kingdom: Animalia
- Phylum: Chordata
- Class: Aves
- Order: Apodiformes
- Family: Trochilidae
- Genus: Oxypogon
- Species: O. stuebelii

Binomial name
- Oxypogon stuebelii Meyer, AB, 1884

= Buffy helmetcrest =

Species of hummingbird

The buffy helmetcrest (Oxypogon stuebelii) is a Vulnerable species of hummingbird in the "coquettes", tribe Lesbiini of subfamily Lesbiinae. It is endemic to Colombia.

== Taxonomy and systematics ==
The buffy helmetcrest was formerly considered to be a subspecies of what was known as the bearded helmetcrest (Oxypogon guerinii). The buffy helmetcrest was promoted to species status when the bearded helmetcrest was split into four species based on a study of biometric and plumage data published in 2013. The nominate subspecies was renamed the Green-bearded helmetcrest. The buffy helmetcrest is monotypic.

== Description ==
The buffy helmetcrest is 11.2 to 12.7 cm (4.4 to 5.0 in) long. It has a short straight black bill. The male has a long buffy and black crest and a mostly black face with a buffy-white "collar". Its upperparts are bronzy green. It has a thin glittering green and blue gorget that forms a "beard". The rest of the underparts are grayish bronzy that blends to cinnamon-buff on the undertail coverts. The tail is moderately long and forked. Its upper side is coppery to bronzy green with the outer feathers showing a wide white stripe; the underside is rufous with some pale cinnamon. The adult female is similar to the male but lacks the crest and beard, and its underparts are rufous buff to brownish with greenish flecks. Juveniles resemble the adult female; the male has a partial crest and beard.

== Distribution and habitat ==
The buffy helmetcrest is found only on Nevado del Ruiz, an active volcano in the Colombian Central Andes on the border of Tolima and Caldas departments and the surrounding area. It inhabits humid open páramo where it favors Espeletia plants.

== Behavior ==
=== Movement ===
The buffy helmetcrest is thought to be sedentary, but might move to lower elevations in the dry season like its congener the white-bearded helmetcrest (O. lindenii).

=== Feeding ===
The buffy helmetcrest feeds on nectar; it especially favors Espeletia schultzii. It drinks nectar by clinging to flowers rather than hovering. It also feeds on insects and their larvae. It catches insects on the ground or by jumping or hawking from the ground or a perch. It also picks larvae from vegetation.

=== Breeding ===
Nothing has been documented of the buffy helmetcrest's breeding phenology.

=== Vocalization ===
The buffy helmetcrest's song is "a repeated, high-pitched, single note 'tsee'...[repeated] every 3–5 seconds)." During the wet season, males sing for minutes on end from a perch.

== Status ==
The IUCN has assessed the buffy helmetcrest as Vulnerable. It has a very small range, and though much of that area is within Los Nevados National Park, its páramo habitat elsewhere is being rapidly degraded. Its population is estimated at under 1000 mature individuals and is believed to be decreasing.
