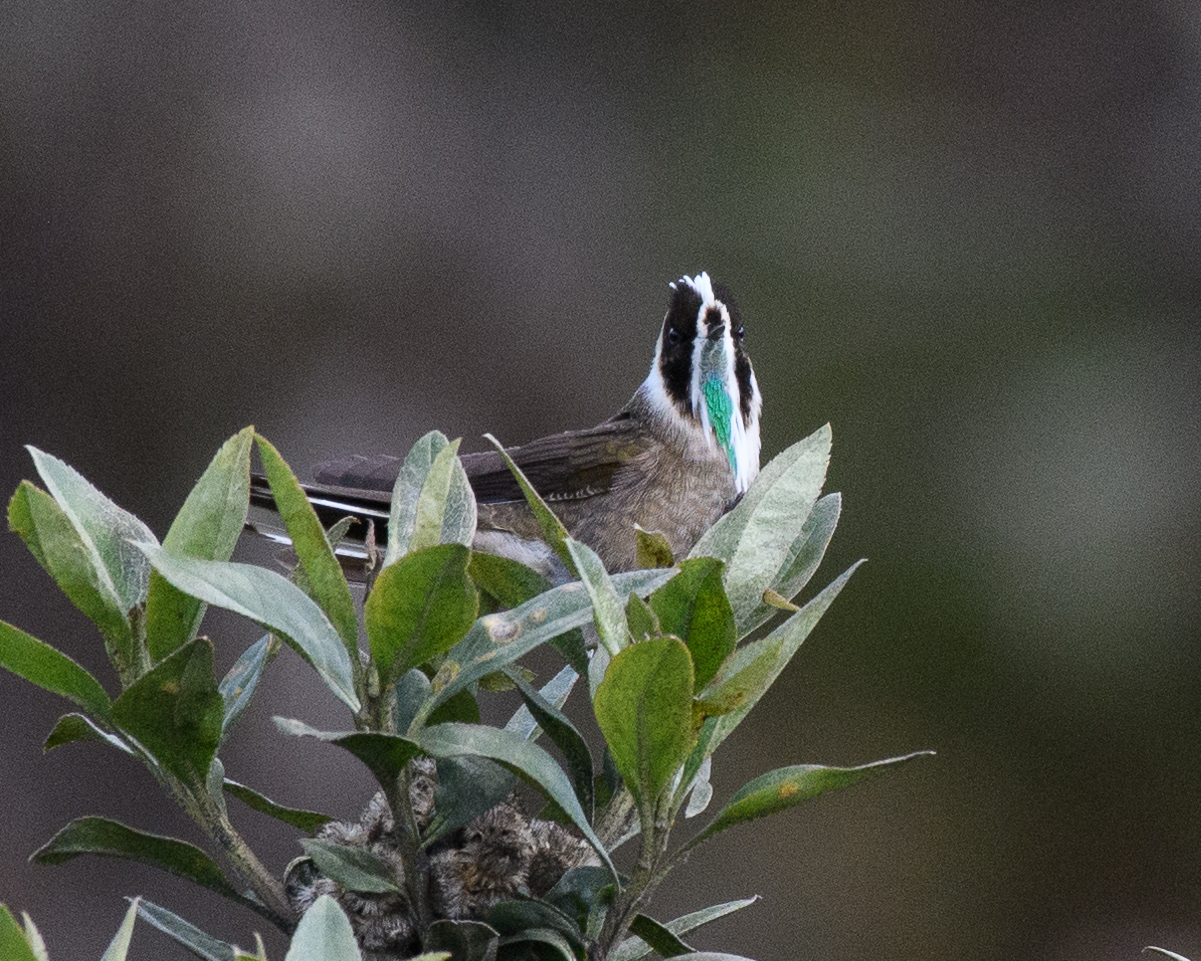
- Male showing chin stripe
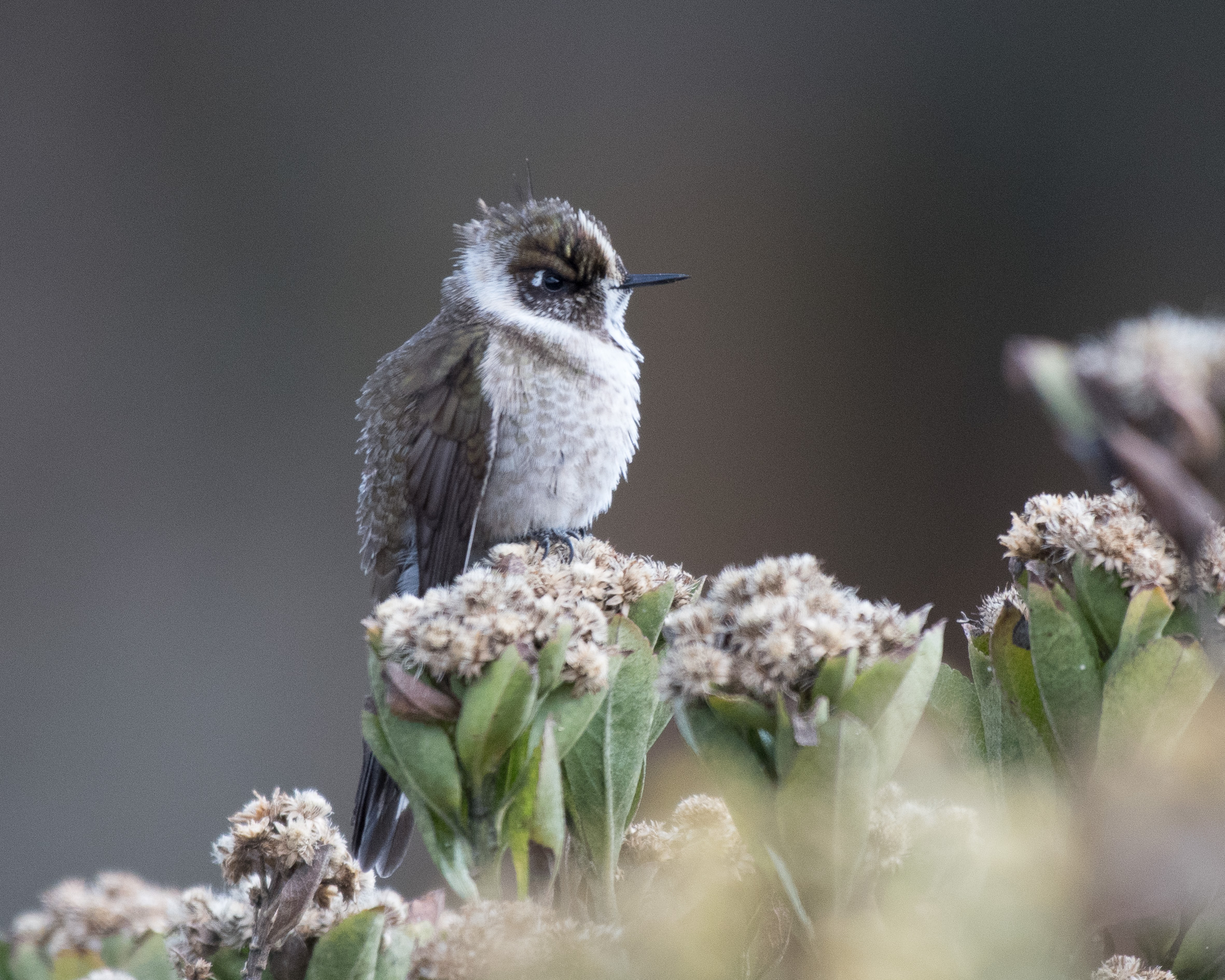
- Female

Conservation status
- Least Concern (IUCN 3.1)
- CITES Appendix II

Scientific classification
- Kingdom: Animalia
- Phylum: Chordata
- Class: Aves
- Order: Apodiformes
- Family: Trochilidae
- Genus: Oxypogon
- Species: O. guerinii

Binomial name
- Oxypogon guerinii (Boissonneau, 1840)

Synonyms
- Ornismya guerinii (protonym)

= Green-bearded helmetcrest =

Species of hummingbird

The green-bearded helmetcrest (Oxypogon guerinii) is a species of hummingbird in the "coquettes", tribe Lesbiini of subfamily Lesbiinae. It is endemic to Colombia.

== Taxonomy and systematics ==
The green-bearded helmetcrest was formally described in 1840 by the French ornithologist Auguste Boissonneau from a specimen collected near Bogotá in central Colombia. This species is now placed in the genus Oxypogon that was introduced by the English ornithologist John Gould in 1848. The genus name combines the Ancient Greek oxy meaning ″sharp or pointed″ and pogon meaning beard. The species name was chosen to honour the French naturalist and collector Félix Guérin-Méneville. The species is monotypic: no subspecies are recognised.

The green-bearded helmetcrest was formerly considered a species named bearded helmetcrest with four subspecies. In 2014 the South America Classification Committee (SACC) of the American Ornithological Society agreed to a proposal to split this species into four separate species based on plumage differences and morphometrics. Other taxonomies soon followed suit. The other species are the buffy helmetcrest (O. stuebelii) of the Cordillera Central, the blue-bearded helmetcrest (O. cyanolaemus) of the Sierra Nevada de Santa Marta, and the white-bearded helmetcrest (O. lindenii) of the Cordillera de Mérida in Venezuela.

== Description ==
The green-bearded helmetcrest is 11.2 to 12.7 cm (4.4 to 5.0 in) long. Males weight about 5.7 g (0.20 oz) and females 4.8 g (0.17 oz) It has a short straight black bill. The adult male has a long white crest and a mostly dark brown to black face with a white "collar". Its upperparts are bronzy. It has a thin glittering green gorget with white edges that forms a "beard". The rest of the underparts are grayish bronzy. The tail is moderately long, forked, and coppery to bronzy green with much white on the outer feathers. The adult female is similar to the male but lacks the crest and beard, and its underparts are buffy white with some greenish mottling. Juveniles resemble the adult female; the male has a partial crest and beard.

== Distribution and habitat ==
The green-bearded helmetcrest is found in Colombia's Eastern Andes as far south as Cundinamarca Department. It inhabits humid páramo, especially that with Espeletia vegetation. It also sometimes occurs at the edge of Polylepis woodlands. Females often occur in gorges while males tend to remain in more open landscapes. In elevation the species ranges between 3,000 and 4,200 m (9,800 and 13,800 ft).

== Behavior ==
=== Movement ===
The green-bearded helmetcrest is found year-round in páramo but is suspected to move to high elevation forest in the dry season. Its close relative the white-bearded helmetcrest migrates from the high páramo in the wet season to lower elevations in the dry and the green-bearded might also follow this pattern.

=== Feeding ===
The green-bearded helmetcrest feeds on nectar at a wide variety of flowering plants but is partial to Espeletia species. It nectars mostly by clinging to flowers but does hover to feed. It is thought that the short, fine bill of this bird and the other Oxypogon species is an adaption to facilitate extracting nectar from the numerous tiny florets of the flower heads of these plants. It also feeds on insects that it catches insects on the ground, by hovering, or by jumping or hawking from the ground or a perch.

=== Breeding ===
The green-bearded helmetcrest's breeding season is tied to the flowering of Espeletia and is usually between May and September. Little else is known about its breeding phenology. However, it is assumed to be very similar to that of the white-bearded helmetcrest. That species makes a large nest of Espeletia fibers in cavities or below overhangs where it is protected from sun and rain. Its clutch size is two eggs; the female incubates for 21 to 23 days and fledging occurs 35 to 38 days after hatch.

=== Vocalization ===
Few of the green-bearded helmetcrest's vocalizations have been described, but one is "an insistent 'tii…tii…'" given by males chasing a female.

== Status ==
The IUCN has assessed the green-bearded helmetcrest as being of Least Concern. It has a limited range and its population size is not known and believed to be decreasing. It is considered locally common and occurs in several protected areas.
