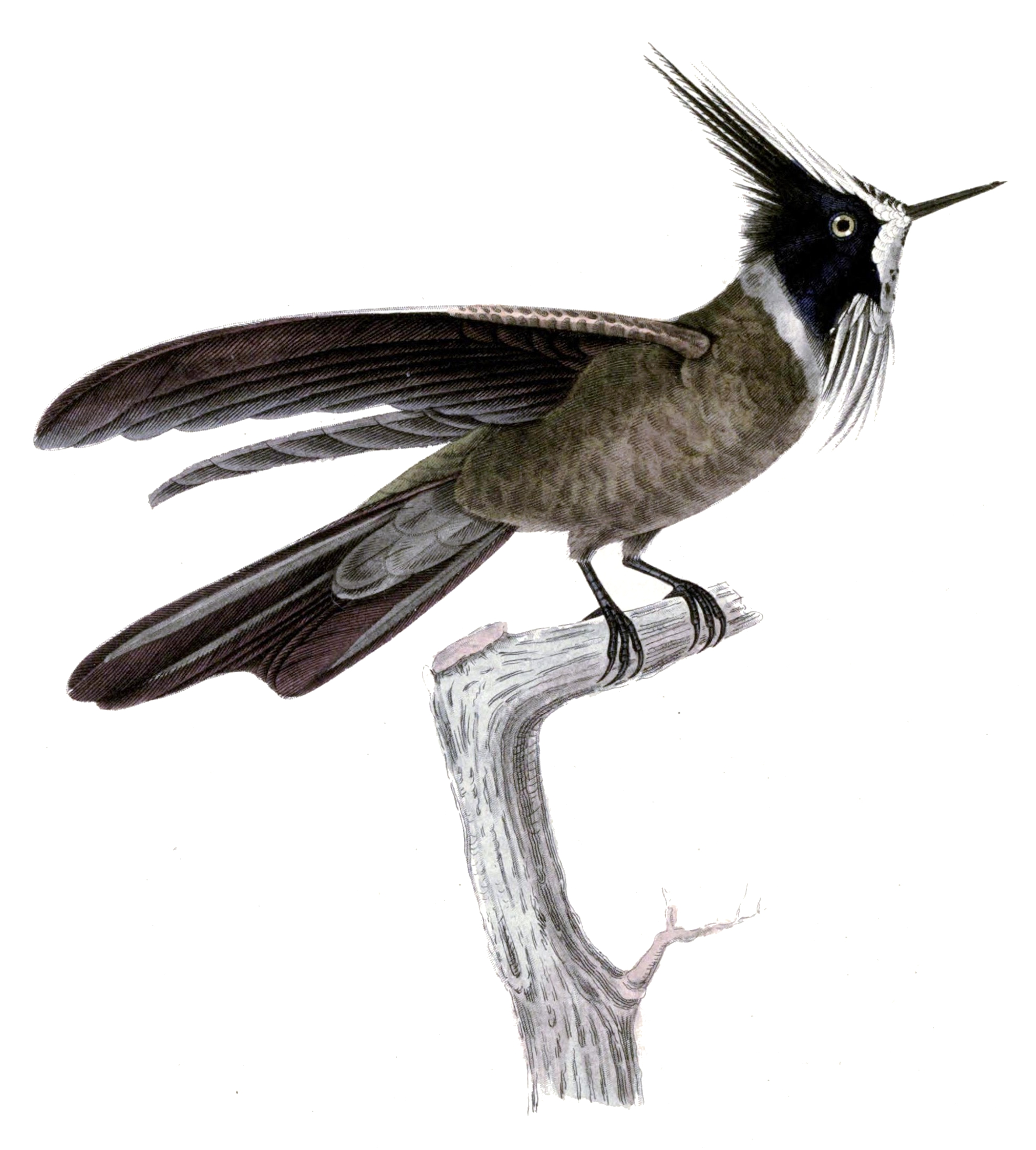

Conservation status
- Least Concern (IUCN 3.1)
- CITES Appendix II (CITES)

Scientific classification
- Kingdom: Animalia
- Phylum: Chordata
- Class: Aves
- Clade: Strisores
- Order: Apodiformes
- Family: Trochilidae
- Genus: Oxypogon
- Species: O. lindenii

Binomial name
- Oxypogon lindenii (Parzudaki, 1845)

= White-bearded helmetcrest =

Species of hummingbird

The white-bearded helmetcrest (Oxypogon lindenii) is a species of hummingbird in the "coquettes", tribe Lesbiini of subfamily Lesbiinae. It is endemic to northwestern Venezuela.

== Taxonomy and systematics ==
The white-bearded helmetcrest was formerly considered to be a subspecies of what was known as the bearded helmetcrest (Oxypogon guerinii). The white-bearded helmetcrest was promoted to species status when the bearded helmetcrest was split into four species based on a study of biometric and plumage data published in 2013. The nominate subspecies was renamed the green-bearded helmetcrest. The white-bearded helmetcrest is monotypic.

== Description ==
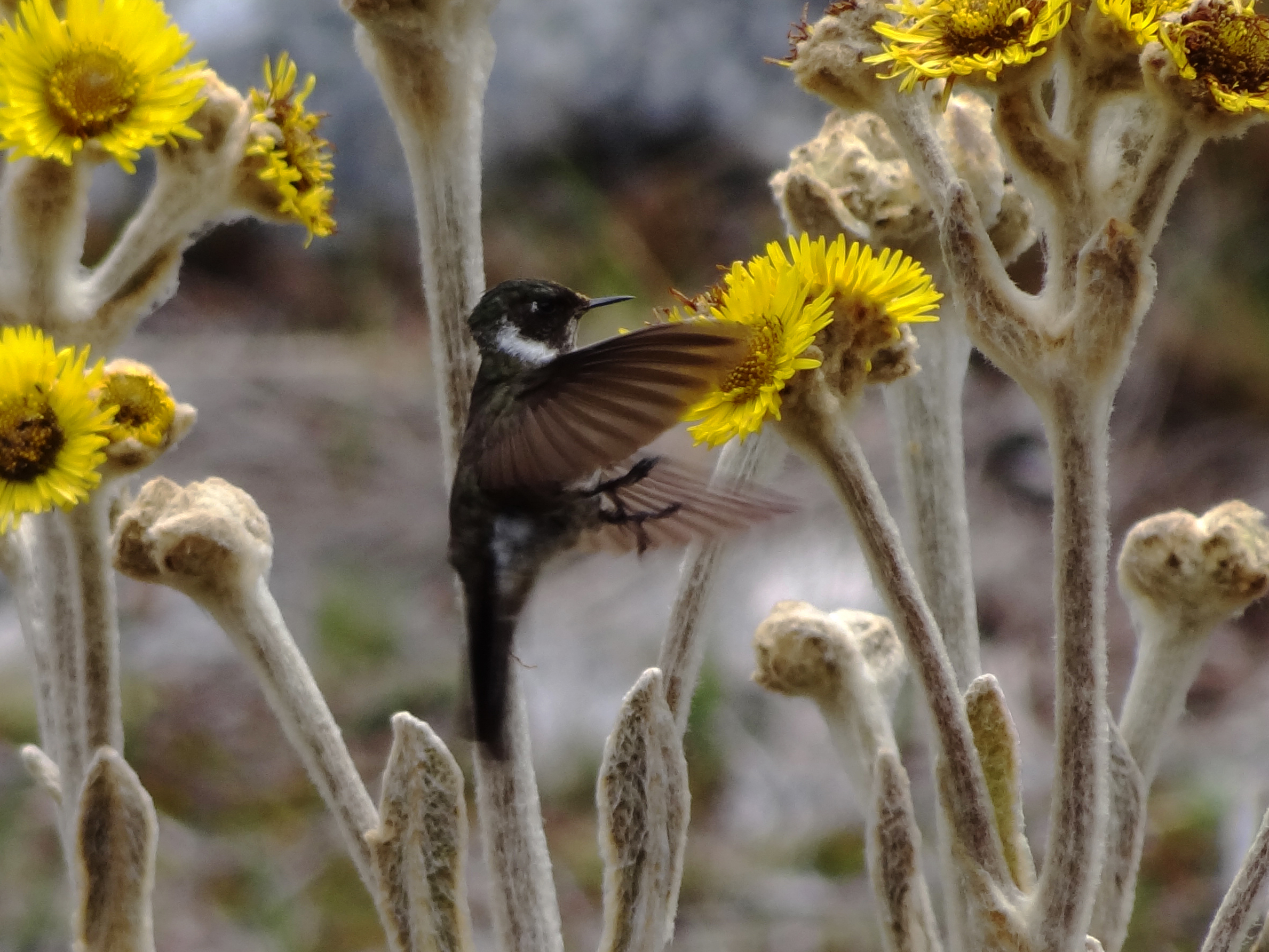
Feeding on a flower

The white-bearded helmetcrest is about 11.5 cm (4.5 in) long and weighs about 4.8 g (0.17 oz). It has a short straight bill. The adult male has a long black and white crest and a mostly black face with a wide white "collar". Its upperparts are bronzy green with a slight gray scaly appearance. It has a long thin white "beard". The rest of the underparts are dingy gray with green spots. The tail is moderately long and forked. The upper side of its central feathers are olive green and the rest dusky; the underside of the feathers are maroon with white shafts and some narrow white at the base. The adult female is similar to the male but lacks the crest and beard, and its underparts are dull white with dense greenish brown spots. Juveniles are not well studied but are believed to resemble the adult female.

== Distribution and habitat ==
The white-bearded helmetcrest is found only in the Andes of northwestern Venezuela, in Mérida and Trujillo states. It inhabits humid páramo, especially that with Espeletia vegetation. It also sometimes occurs at the edge of Polylepis woodlands. Females often occur in gorges while males tend to remain in more open landscapes. In elevation the species ranges between 3,600 and 4,500 m (11,800 and 14,800 ft) though there is at least one record as low as 2,800 m (9,200 ft).

== Behavior ==
=== Movement ===
The white-bearded helmetcrest migrates from the high páramo in the wet season to lower elevations in the dry.

=== Feeding ===
The white-bearded helmetcrest feeds on nectar; it especially favors Espeletia schultzii and Castilleja fissifolia. It nectars by clinging to flowers rather than hovering. It also feeds on insects and their larvae. It catches insects on the ground or by jumping or hawking from the ground or a perch. It picks larvae from vegetation.

=== Breeding ===
The white-bearded helmetcrest's breeding season is tied to the flowering of Espeletia and is usually between June and November. It makes a large nest of Espeletia fibers in cavities or below overhangs where it is protected from sun and rain. The clutch size it two eggs; the female incubates for 21 to 23 days and fledging occurs 35 to 38 days after hatch.

=== Vocalization ===
The white-bearded helmetcrest's song is "a repeated, high-pitched, slightly buzzy, single note 'tzee' or 'peek'" that it sings repeatedly from a perch on a small shrub during the breeding season.

== Status ==
The IUCN has assessed the white-bearded helmetcrest as being of Least Concern. It has a very small range and its population size is not known and believed to be decreasing. Thought it is considered very common and occurs in two national parks, overgrazing is a problem even in them.
