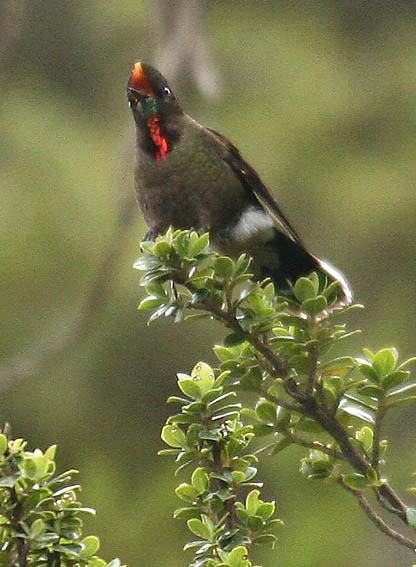
- Male in Yanacocha Reserve, Ecuador
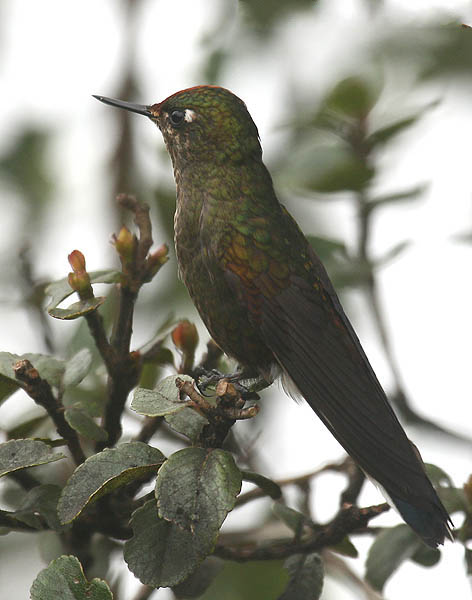
- Female in northwest Ecuador

Conservation status
- Least Concern (IUCN 3.1)
- CITES Appendix II

Scientific classification
- Kingdom: Animalia
- Phylum: Chordata
- Class: Aves
- Order: Apodiformes
- Family: Trochilidae
- Genus: Chalcostigma
- Species: C. herrani

Binomial name
- Chalcostigma herrani (Delattre & Bourcier, 1846)

= Rainbow-bearded thornbill =

Species of hummingbird

The rainbow-bearded thornbill (Chalcostigma herrani) is a species of hummingbird in the "coquettes", tribe Lesbiini of subfamily Lesbiinae. It is found in Colombia, Ecuador, and Peru.

== Taxonomy and systematics ==
The rainbow-bearded thornbill was formally described in 1846 by the French ornithologists Adolphe Delattre and Jules Bourcier from specimens collected near the town of Pasto in southwest Colombia. They coined the binomial name Trochilus herrani. This bird is now one of five species placed in the genus Chalcostigma that was introduced in 1854 by the German naturalist Ludwig Reichenbach. (The South American Classification Committee (SACC) of the American Ornithological Society is considering a proposal to merge the genus into Oxypogon).

The genus name derives from the Greek khalkos ″bronze″ and stigma ″mark″. The specific epithet herrani was chosen to honor the Colombian general and statesman Pedro Alcántara Herrán.

Two subspecies are recognised:

- C. h. tolimae Kleinschmidt, O, 1927
- C. h. herrani (Delattre & Bourcier, 1846)

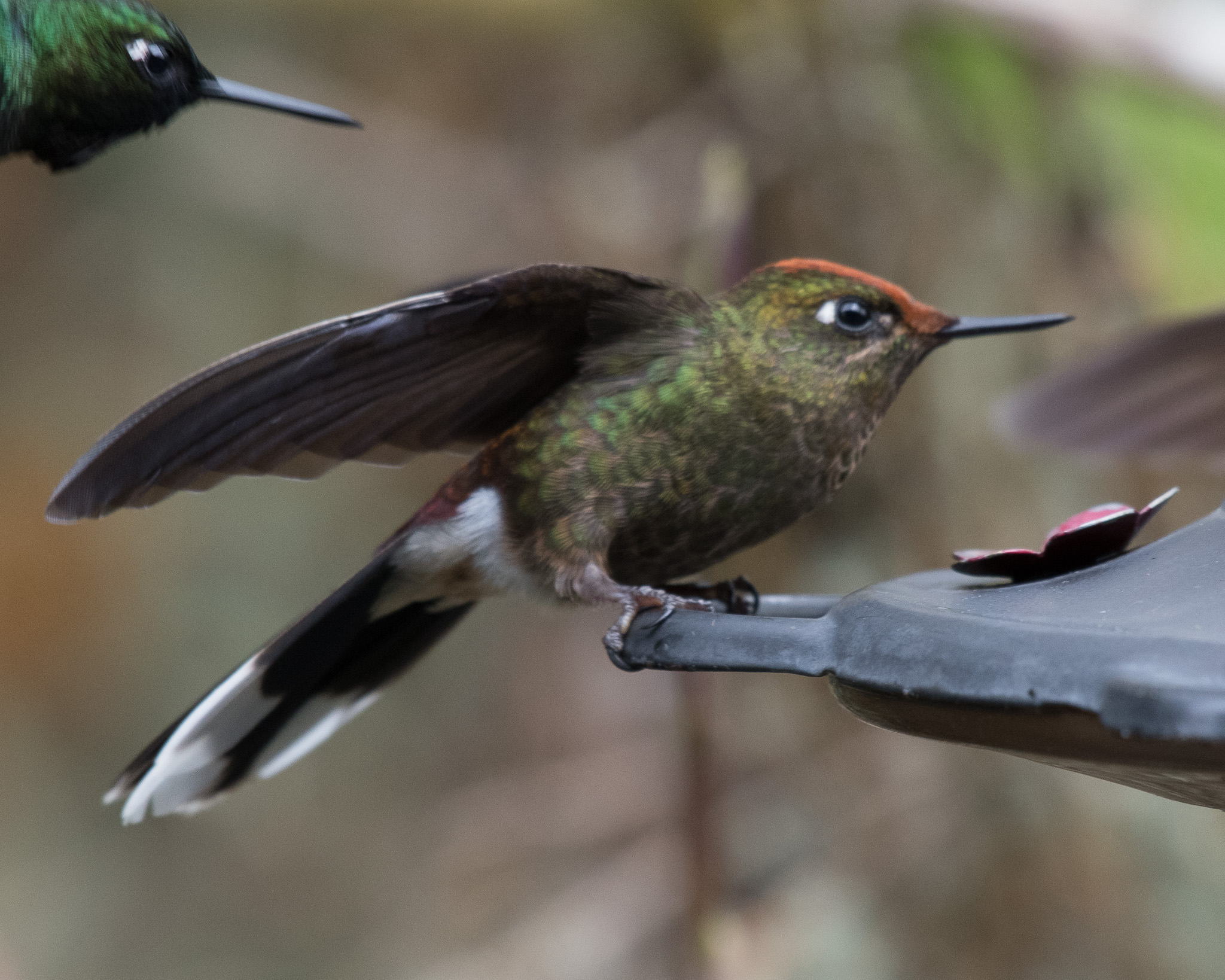
Rainbow-bearded thornbill

== Description ==
The rainbow-bearded thornbill is 10 to 12 cm (3.9 to 4.7 in) long. Males weigh about 6.2 g (0.22 oz) and females 5.6 g (0.20 oz). Both sexes have a short, needle-like bill. Adult males of the nominate subspecies are mostly bottle green with a white dot behind the eye and rufous forecrown and crown. It has black primaries, a coppery rump, and white undertail coverts. The forked tail is blue-black with prominent white tips at the corners that are most easily seen from below. Its gorget ("beard") is a rainbow of colors from celadon-green through turquoise to yellow and red at the lower end. The feet are black. Adult females are generally similar to males, but with pale yellowish-ochre from lower the belly to the undertail coverts and a much reduced gorget. Juvenile birds are similar to the adult female, but the male has an entirely dark throat. Subspecies C. h. tolimae is very similar to the nominate but is darker overall and its gorget is longer.

== Distribution and habitat ==
The nominate subspecies of rainbow-bearded thornbill is found from the Western Andes of Colombia in Cauca Department through Ecuador on both slopes of the Andes into northern Peru's departments of Piura and Cajamarca. C. h. tolimae is restricted to Nevado del Tolima in Colombia's Central Andes. A bird of high elevations, it is typically found between 2,700 and 4,100 m (8,900 and 13,500 ft) in Colombia and 2,800 and 3,700 m (9,200 and 12,100 ft) in Ecuador. Its primary habitat is paramo, open country with bushy patches and small woodlands, and gulleys with thickets of ferns and bromeliads.

== Behavior ==
=== Movement ===
The rainbow-bearded thornbill is resident throughout its range.

=== Feeding ===
The rainbow-bearded thornbill mostly feeds on the nectar of small flowers on low bushes and shrubs. It often clings to these flowers while feeding. It will take insect prey when available. The species typically forages alone and is very territorial. It will chase off competitors for food sources, even if they are considerably larger (e.g. flowerpiercers) and will not tolerate other hummingbirds even on large fruiting trees.

=== Breeding ===
The rainbow-bearded thornbill's breeding phenology is not well documented. Its breeding season appears to include at least July to September. The nest has not been described. One nest with three eggs has been reported, departing from the almost invariable two-egg clutch of hummingbirds.

=== Vocalization ===
There are few recordings of the rainbow-bearded thornbill's vocalizations. What might be a song is a "repeated low-pitched cheet-dee-dee-cheet".

== Status ==
The IUCN has assessed the rainbow-bearded thornbill as being of Least Concern. It has a large range but its population size is unknown and believed to be decreasing. No specific threats have been identified. It is usually described as rare to locally common.
