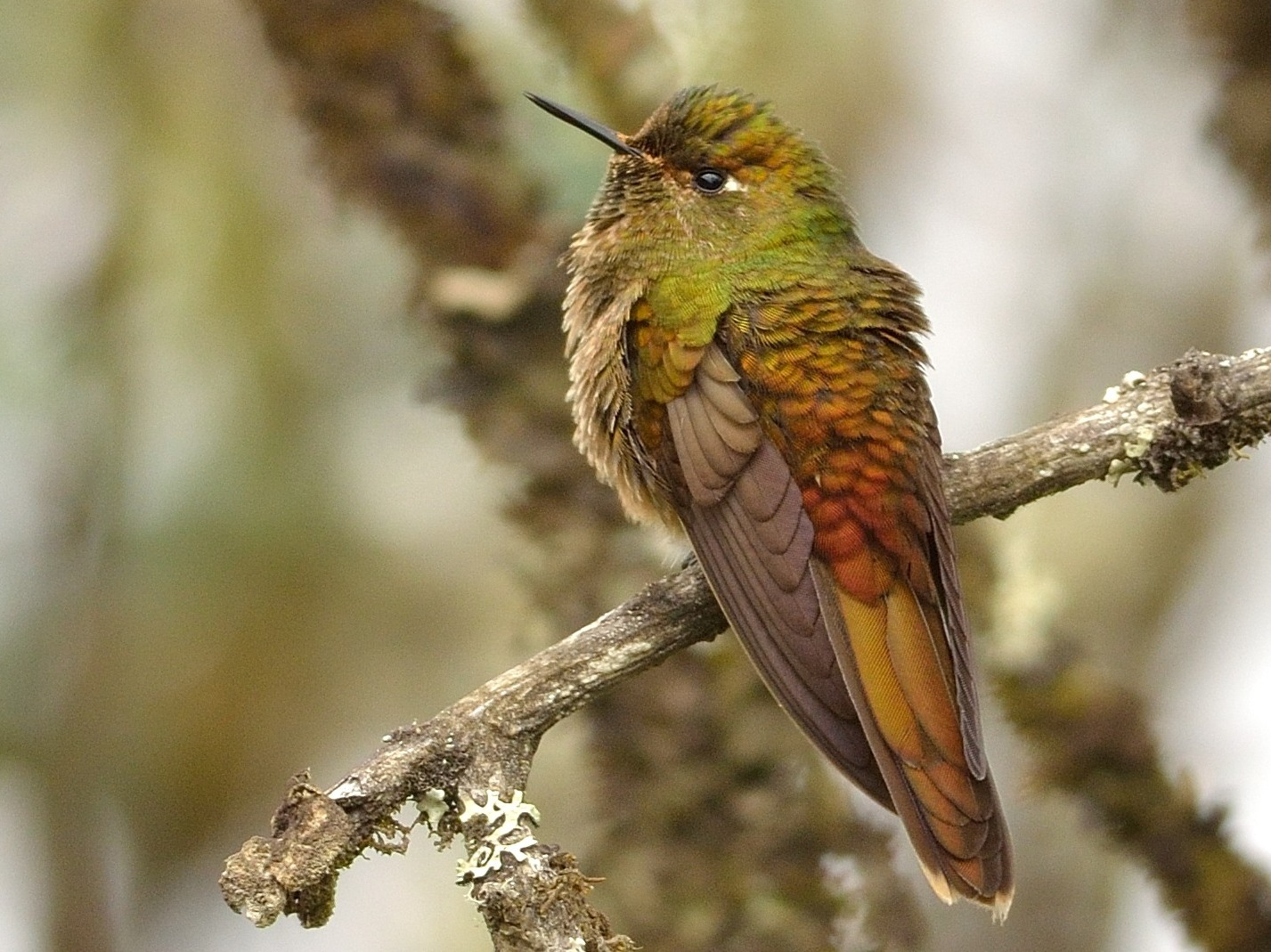

Conservation status
- Least Concern (IUCN 3.1)
- CITES Appendix II

Scientific classification
- Kingdom: Animalia
- Phylum: Chordata
- Class: Aves
- Order: Apodiformes
- Family: Trochilidae
- Genus: Chalcostigma
- Species: C. heteropogon

Binomial name
- Chalcostigma heteropogon (Boissonneau, 1840)

= Bronze-tailed thornbill =

Species of hummingbird

The bronze-tailed thornbill (Chalcostigma heteropogon) is a species of hummingbird in the "coquettes", tribe Lesbiini of subfamily Lesbiinae. It is found in Colombia and Venezuela.

== Taxonomy and systematics ==
The taxonomy of genus Chalcostigma is unsettled. The South American Classification Committee (SACC) of the American Ornithological Society is considering a proposal to merge the genus into Oxypogon. The bronze-tailed thornbill is monotypic.

== Description ==
The bronze-tailed thornbill is 13 to 14 cm (5.1 to 5.5 in) long and weighs 5.9 to 6.3 g (0.21 to 0.22 oz). Both sexes have a short straight black bill. Adults are generally bottle green overall, with coppery red uppertail coverts and a forked olive green tail. Adult males have a narrow gorget that is emerald green under the chin and transitions to pink at the bottom. Adult females are similar but the gorget is paler green and does not have the pink "beard"; in addition their outer tail feathers have pale tips. Juveniles resemble adult females with the addition of a mahogany red crown.

== Distribution and habitat ==
The bronze-tailed thornbill is found from the Tamá Massif of extreme western Venezuela through the Eastern Andes of Colombia as far south as Cundinamarca Department. It inhabits steep rocky slopes within semi-arid to humid páramo grasslands and also the edges of Polylepis and other stunted woodland. In elevation it ranges between 3,000 and 3,900 m (9,800 and 12,800 ft).

== Behavior ==
=== Movement ===
The bronze-tailed thornbill is thought to be sedentary, but it possibly makes seasonal elevational movements.

=== Feeding ===
The bronze-tailed thornbill feeds on nectar from a variety of flowers and shrubs. It forages by clinging to flowers or hovering, and not on the ground like some others of its genus. Both sexes are aggessive and defend patches of flowers. The species also gleans insects from vegetation and sallies to catch them on the wing.

=== Breeding ===
The bronze-tailed thornbill's breeding season is thought to span from September to January but may extend further at either end. As is typical of hummingbirds, the female alone incubates the two white eggs. Nothing else has been documented about its breeding phenology.

=== Vocalization ===
The bronze-tailed thornbill makes "a dull short 'tzk'" call; other vocalizations if any are not known.

== Status ==
The IUCN has assessed the bronze-tailed thornbill as being of Least Concern. However, it has a restricted range and its population size is unknown and believed to be decreasing. It occurs in some protected areas, and "the altitude and inhospitable climate of the region...offer some protection against intrusion by man." However, Polylepis woodlands are degraded over much of its range.
