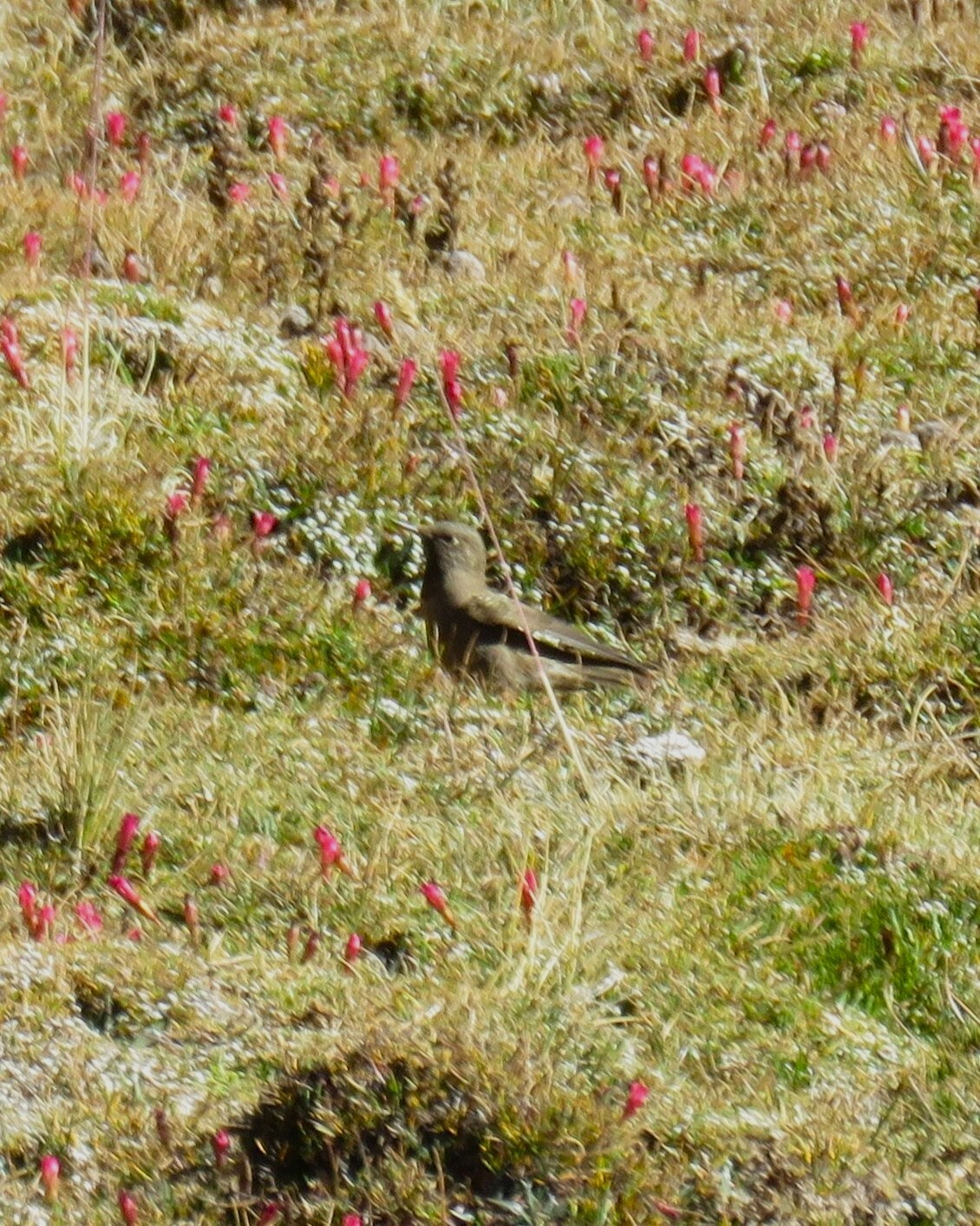

Conservation status
- Least Concern (IUCN 3.1)
- CITES Appendix II

Scientific classification
- Kingdom: Animalia
- Phylum: Chordata
- Class: Aves
- Order: Apodiformes
- Family: Trochilidae
- Genus: Chalcostigma
- Species: C. olivaceum

Binomial name
- Chalcostigma olivaceum (Lawrence, 1864)

= Olivaceous thornbill =

Species of hummingbird

The olivaceous thornbill (Chalcostigma olivaceum) is a species of hummingbird in the "coquettes", tribe Lesbiini of subfamily Lesbiinae. It is found in Bolivia and Peru.

== Taxonomy and systematics ==
The taxonomy of genus Chalcostigma is unsettled. The South American Classification Committee (SACC) of the American Ornithological Society is considering a proposal to merge the genus into Oxypogon. The olivaceous thornbill has two subspecies, the nominate C. o. olivaceum and C. o. pallens.

== Description ==
The olivaceous thornbill is 12 to 15 cm (4.7 to 5.9 in) long. One male specimen weighed 8.2 g (0.29 oz) and a female one 6.6 g (0.23 oz). Both sexes have a short black bill. Adult males of the nominate subspecies are mostly dull dark bronzy or olive green, including the tail. The face and throat are dark sooty gray. It has a narrow gorget that is glittering green at the throat and shades through yellow, pink, and purple to blue at its bottom. The adult nominate female is essentially the same but the gorget is much smaller or may be absent. Juveniles have tan margins on some feathers; males' throats are gray brown and females' gray brown with pale margins. C. o. pallens is similar to the nominate but smaller and overall paler. The upperparts have a grayish cast to the bronzy or olive green, the tail is bronzy olive brown, and the underparts are dark sooty brown.

== Distribution and habitat ==
The nominate subspecies of olivaceous thornbill is found from Apurímac in southeastern Peru to Bolivia's La Paz Department. Its distribution is nearly continuous along this axis. C. o. pallens is found on the western slope of the Peruvian Andes between the departments of Ancash and Junín. Its distribution is more patchy, with records only at scattered sites. In elevation the species ranges between 3,500 and 4,700 m (11,500 and 15,400 ft) in Peru and 3,100 and 4,500 m (10,200 and 14,800 ft) in Bolivia. The species is most often found in somewhat humid puna grasslands but also inhabits low scrub and the edges of dense woods of Polylepis and Gynoxys.

== Behavior ==
=== Movement ===
The olivaceous thornbill is resident throughout its range.

=== Feeding ===
The olivaceous thornbill feeds on both nectar and insects. Details of its diet are lacking but there is some evidence that insects predominate. It forages near the ground and has even been observed walking on matted grass. It captures small insects by sallying from the ground or by gleaning from low vegetation. Males defend feeding territories.

=== Breeding ===
The olivaceous thornbill's breeding phenology is not well understood. Its breeding season appears to include January but its span is not known. It possibly nests in Polylepis/Gynoxys woods. As is typical of hummingbirds, the female alone incubates the clutch of two eggs.

=== Vocalization ===
As of early 2022, Xeno-canto had only one recording of an olivaceous thornbill vocalization, described as "a 'tzit' call". Cornell University's Macaulay Library had none.

== Status ==
The IUCN has assessed the olivaceous thornbill as being of Least Concern. It has a large range but its population size is unknown and believed to be decreasing. It is described as rare to uncommon in different parts of its range. "Human activity has little short-term direct effect on Olivaceous Thornbill"
