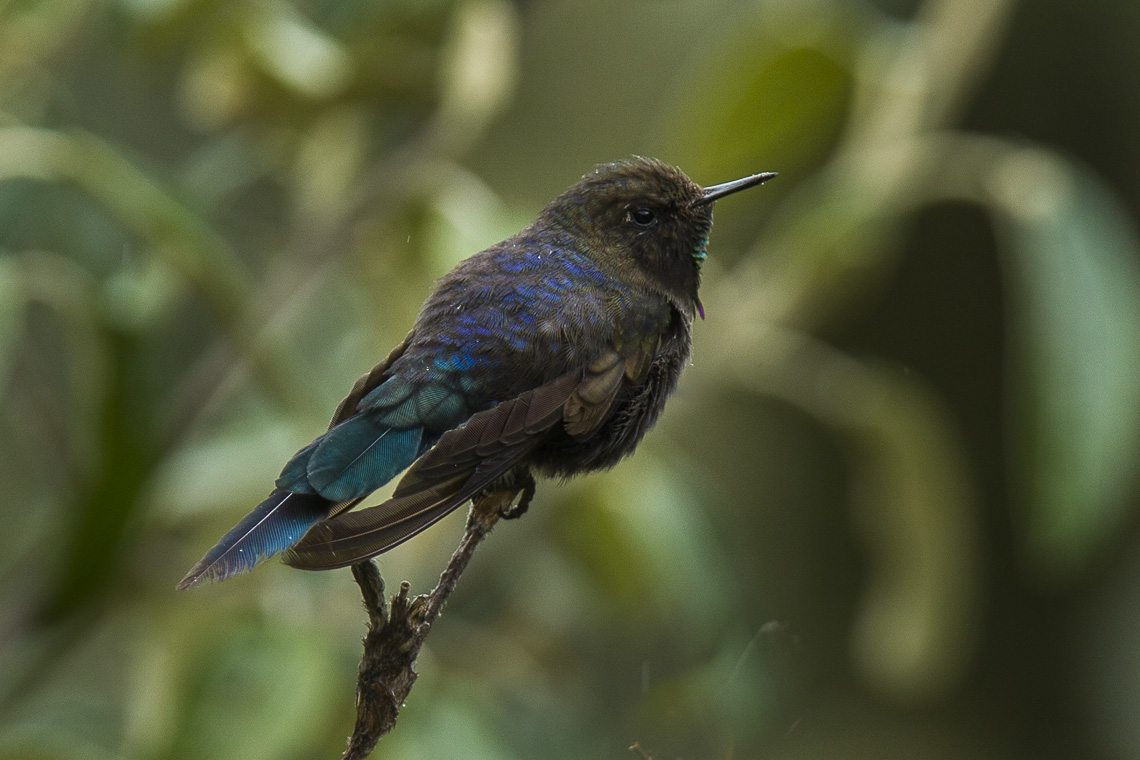

Conservation status
- Least Concern (IUCN 3.1)
- CITES Appendix II

Scientific classification
- Kingdom: Animalia
- Phylum: Chordata
- Class: Aves
- Order: Apodiformes
- Family: Trochilidae
- Genus: Chalcostigma
- Species: C. stanleyi

Binomial name
- Chalcostigma stanleyi (Bourcier, 1851)

= Blue-mantled thornbill =

Species of hummingbird

The blue-mantled thornbill (Chalcostigma stanleyi) is a species of hummingbird in the "coquettes", tribe Lesbiini of subfamily Lesbiinae. It is found in Bolivia, Ecuador, and Peru.

== Taxonomy and systematics ==
The taxonomy of genus Chalcostigma is unsettled. The South American Classification Committee (SACC) of the American Ornithological Society is considering a proposal to merge the genus into Oxypogon. The blue-mantled thornbill has three recognized subspecies, the nominate C. s. stanleyi (Bourcier, 1851), C. s. versigulare (Zimmer, 1924), and C. s. vulcani (Gould, 1852).

== Description ==
The blue-mantled thornbill is 12 to 13 cm (4.7 to 5.1 in) long; males weigh about 6.2 g (0.22 oz) and females 4.5 g (0.16 oz). Both sexes have a short straight black bill and a small white spot behind the eye. Adult males of the nominate subspecies are generally dark sooty brown. The crown and nape have a bronzy green sheen, the back reflects violet-blue, and the uppertail coverts are turquoise. The forked tail is steel blue. They have a narrow gorget that is emerald green on the chin and transitions through pink to purple-violet or violet-blue at the lower edge. Adult females are similar, but the gorget has only the green under the chin and the outer tail feathers have pale tips. Juveniles resemble the adult female.

Subspecies C. s. versigulare's entire upperparts (not just the back) reflect deep violet-blue, and the lower pink to violet of the gorget is narrower than in the nominate. C. s. vulcani is similar to versigulare but the lower part of its gorget becomes blue-gray or gray-violet.

== Distribution and habitat ==
The nominate subspecies of blue-mantled thornbill is found on both slopes of the Andes of Ecuador between the departments of Carchi and Azauy. C. s. versigulare is found on the Peruvian Andes' east slope from east of the Marañón River south to the Cordillera Carpish in Huánuco Department and also in the Cordillera Blanca on the west slope. C. s. vulcani is found on the eastern Andean slope from southern Peru to Cochabamba Department in central Bolivia.

The blue-mantled thornbill inhabits steep, rocky slopes with somewhat humid páramo grasslands and jalca vegetation. Within those landscapes it favors patches of Polylepis and Gynoxys woodland. In elevation it generally occurs between 3,000 and 4,200 m (9,800 and 13,800 ft) but has been recorded as low as 2,200 m (7,200 ft) and as high as 4,500 m (14,800 ft).

== Behavior ==
=== Movement ===
The blue-mantled thornbill is known to temporarily move to lower elevations during periods of harsh weather, so it is hypothesized to also make seasonal elevational migration.

=== Feeding ===
The blue-mantled thornbill feeds on the nectar of small flowers such as Berberis, Gaultheria, Ribes, and Gentiana. It defends feeding territories. It has been observed gleaning tiny insects from the underside of Gynoxys leaves while clinging to them. It also picks insects from matted grass or rocks by hopping among them, and occasionally sallies to take insects on the wing.

=== Breeding ===
The blue-mantled thornbill is believed to breed during the rainy season. As is typical of hummingbirds, the female alone incubates the two white eggs. Nothing else has been documented about its breeding phenology.

=== Vocalization ===
The blue-mantled thornbill's calls have been described as "a descending squeaky twitter followed by a mellower upslurred note" and "a downslurred 'tseetsitsitsitsitr-whee-tsew' [with] variations."

== Status ==
The IUCN has assessed the blue-mantled thornbill as being of Least Concern. It has a large range but its population size is unknown and believed to be decreasing. Though it is generally fairly common, it is locally under threat by destruction of Polylepis woodlands and conversion of natural grasslands to pasture.

== Additional reading ==
- McMullan, Miles; Navarrete, Lelis (2013). Fieldbook of the Birds of Ecuador. Quito, Ecuador: Jocotoco. p. 80. ISBN 978-0982-7615-33.
- Graham, Catherine; Parra, Juan; Rahbek, Carsten; McGuire, Jimmy (2009). "Phylogenetic Structure in Tropical Hummingbird Communities". Proceedings of the National Academy of Sciences of the United States of America. 106 (Suppl 2). National Academy of Sciences: 19673–19678. doi:10.1073/pnas.0901649106. JSTOR 25593253. PMC 2780942. PMID 19805042.
