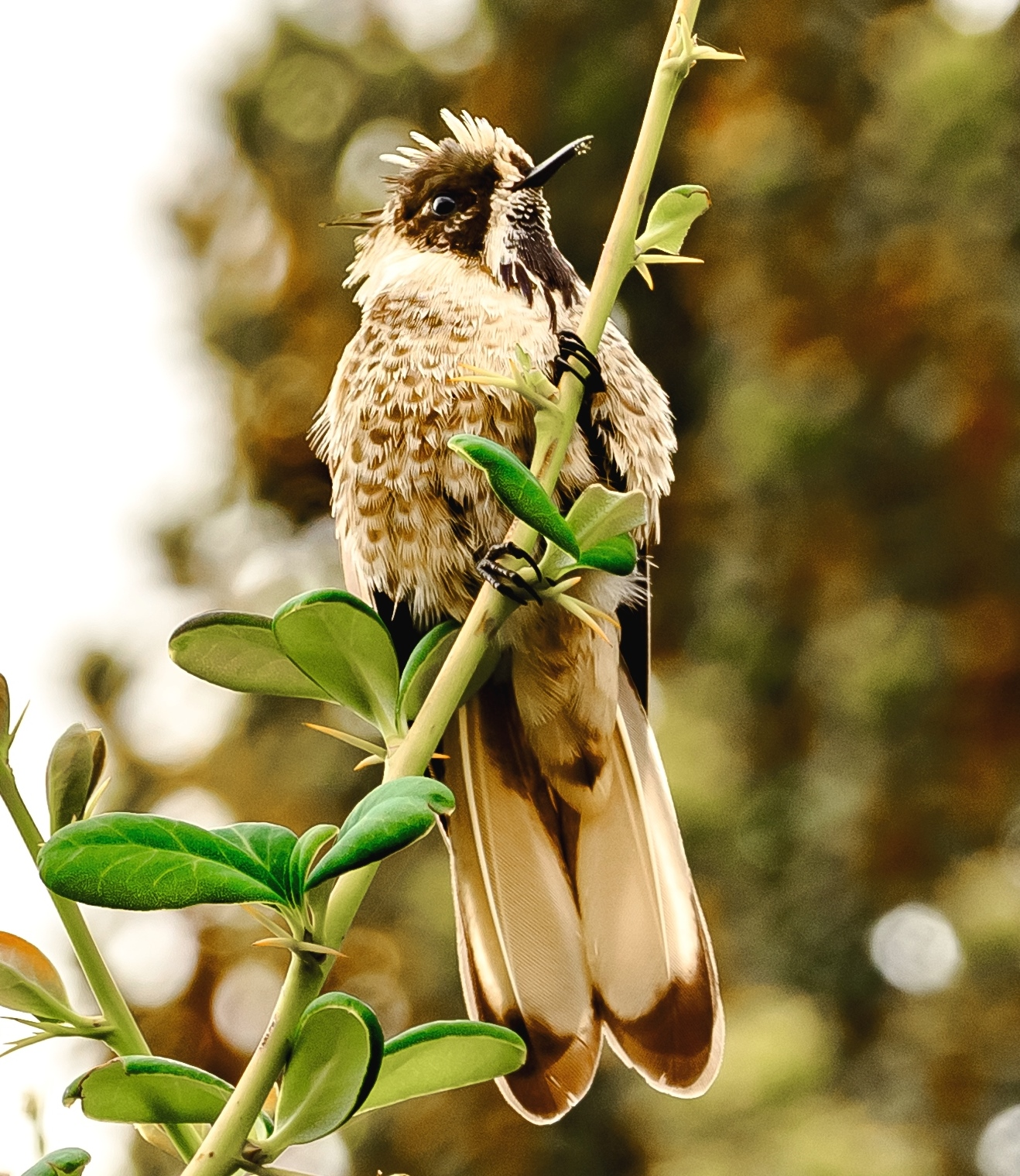
- At Lagos de Sevilla, Santa Marta Mountains, Colombia, photographed by Carole Turek of Hummingbird Spot

Conservation status
- Endangered (IUCN 3.1)
- CITES Appendix II

Scientific classification
- Kingdom: Animalia
- Phylum: Chordata
- Class: Aves
- Clade: Strisores
- Order: Apodiformes
- Family: Trochilidae
- Genus: Oxypogon
- Species: O. cyanolaemus

Binomial name
- Oxypogon cyanolaemus Salvin & Godman, 1880

= Blue-bearded helmetcrest =

Species of hummingbird

The blue-bearded helmetcrest (Oxypogon cyanolaemus) is an Endangered species of hummingbird in the "coquettes", tribe Lesbiini of subfamily Lesbiinae. It is endemic to the Sierra Nevada de Santa Marta of northern Colombia.

== Taxonomy and systematics ==
The blue-bearded helmetcrest was formerly considered to be a subspecies of what was known as the bearded helmetcrest (Oxypogon guerinii). The blue-bearded helmetcrest was promoted to species status when the bearded helmetcrest was split into four species based on a study of biometric and plumage data published in 2013. The nominate subspecies was renamed the green-bearded helmetcrest. The blue-bearded helmetcrest is monotypic.

== Description ==
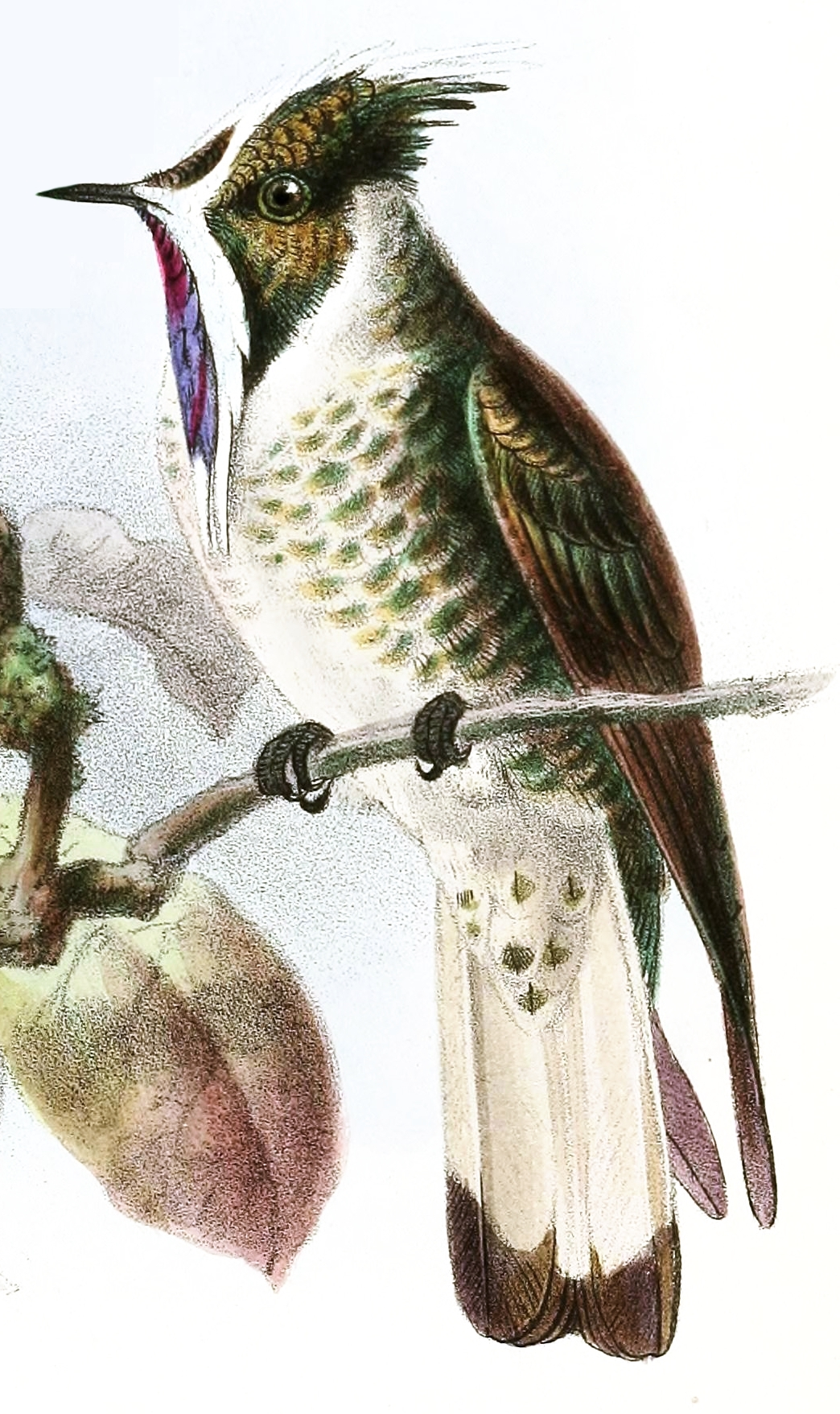
Illustrated by J. G. Keulemans

The blue-bearded helmetcrest is about 11.5 cm (4.5 in) long. It has a short straight bill. The male has a long black and white crest and a mostly dusky face with a buffy-white "collar". Its upperparts are olive green. Its throat has a thin white "beard" with a purplish blue center stripe. The rest of the underparts are dingy buff with olive spots that blends to buffy white on the undertail coverts. The tail is moderately long and forked. The upper side of the central tail feathers is bronzy olive and the rest are white with reddish bronze fringes and tips, and the underside is cream with wide olive tips. The adult female is similar to the male but lacks the crest and beard, is overall duller, and has a white throat. Juveniles resemble the adult female but without the white throat.

== Distribution and habitat ==
The blue-bearded helmetcrest is found only in the isolated Sierra Nevada de Santa Marta of northern Colombia. It inhabits páramo grasslands at elevations between 3,000 and 4,800 m (9,800 and 15,700 ft).

== Behavior ==
=== Movement ===
Nothing is known about the blue-bearded helmetcrest's movements, if any.

=== Feeding ===
Little is known about the blue-bearded helmetcrest's diet or feeding method. It has been observed feeding on nectar at a few species of flowering herbs and shrubs, both by hovering and by clinging to the flowers. Its primary food source appears to be Libanothamnus occultus.

=== Breeding ===
Nothing is known about the blue-bearded helmetcrest's breeding phenology.

=== Vocalization ===
As of February 2022, Xeno-canto had two recordings of blue-bearded helmetcrest vocalizations and Cornell University's Macaulay Library had 13.

== Status ==
The IUCN has assessed the blue-bearded helmetcrest as Endangered. Its population is estimated to be 250 – 999 mature individuals and is believed to be declining. The species was known only from 62 museum specimens with the most recent record in 1946. Surveys during 1999-2003 failed to detect the species. Brief surveys in February 2007 and December 2011 also failed to detect the species. In March 2015, the blue-bearded helmetcrest was rediscovered by researchers from the foundation ProAves while documenting fires set by local farmers. Though the species' entire range is nominally protected in Sierra Nevada de Santa Marta National Park, Indigenous people regularly burn the páramo to produce cattle pasture and collect Libanothamnus occultus for firewood.
