= C. moritziana =

C. moritziana may refer to:

- Canna moritziana, a perennial plant
- Coespeletia moritziana, a flowering plant
- Coussarea moritziana, a New World plant
