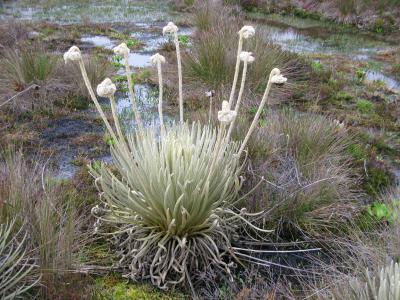

Scientific classification
- Kingdom: Plantae
- Clade: Tracheophytes
- Clade: Angiosperms
- Clade: Eudicots
- Clade: Asterids
- Order: Asterales
- Family: Asteraceae
- Genus: Espeletia
- Species: E. palustris

Binomial name
- Espeletia palustris (Diazgr. & Morillo) Mavárez

Synonyms
- Coespeletia palustris M.Diazgranados & G.Morillo

= Espeletia palustris =

Species of flowering plant

Epeletia palustris is found in a few marshy areas of páramo, and is endemic to the Venezuelan Andes.

It is closely related to E. moritziana, but is different from it in ways like a reduced number of florets in the capitula, much larger ray flowers with longer, more consistent ligulae and also longer linguiform appendages. Its smaller pollen grains, larger cypselae, ebracteate scapes differentiate it from E. moritziana, also its leaves and inflorescences have a more whitish indumentum, it has larger leaf sheaths, and is found in a more marshy habitat than E. moritziana.

The species epithet palustris is Latin for "of the marsh" and indicates its common habitat.
