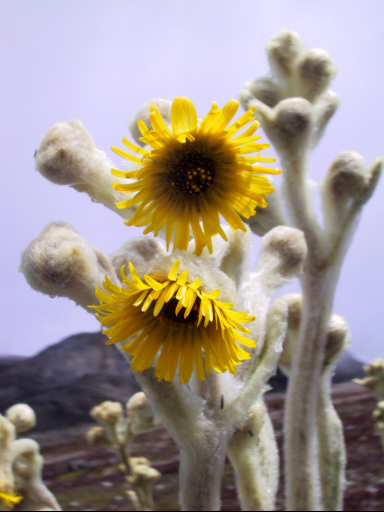

Scientific classification
- Kingdom: Plantae
- Clade: Tracheophytes
- Clade: Angiosperms
- Clade: Eudicots
- Clade: Asterids
- Order: Asterales
- Family: Asteraceae
- Genus: Espeletia
- Species: E. schultzii

Binomial name
- Espeletia schultzii Wedd.

Synonyms
- Espeletia corymbosa Sch.Bip. ex Wedd. nom. illeg.

= Espeletia schultzii =

Species of flowering plant

Espeletia schultzii is a high altitude shrub endemic to the Andes of Venezuela.

Espeletia schultzii his a giant rosette plant, with a large above ground stem (caulescent). It exhibits nyctinasty, folding up its leaves at night to prevent freezing of young leaves in the center of the rosette.
