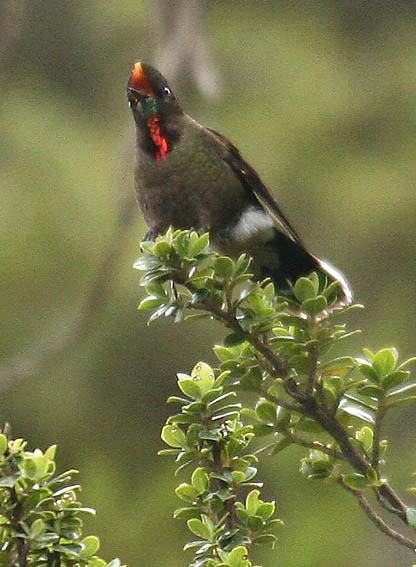
- Rainbow-bearded thornbill (Chalcostigma herrani)

Scientific classification
- Domain: Eukaryota
- Kingdom: Animalia
- Phylum: Chordata
- Class: Aves
- Clade: Strisores
- Order: Apodiformes
- Family: Trochilidae
- Tribe: Lesbiini
- Genus: Chalcostigma; Reichenbach, 1854

Type species
- Ornismya heteropogon Boissonneau, 1840

Species
- 5, see text

= Chalcostigma =

Genus of birds

Chalcostigma is a genus of South American hummingbirds in the family Trochilidae.

== Taxonomy and species list ==
The genus Chalcostigma was introduced in 1854 by the German naturalist Ludwig Reichenbach. The type species was subsequently designated as the bronze-tailed thornbill by George Gray. The name of the genus is derived from the Greek khalkos meaning bronze and stigme for a spot or mark, a reference to the beard on the bronze-tailed thornbill.

The genus contains the following five species:

Genus Chalcostigma – Reichenbach, 1854 – five species
Common name	Scientific name and subspecies	Range	Size and ecology	IUCN status and estimated population
Rufous-capped thornbill	Chalcostigma ruficeps (Gould, 1846)	Bolivia, Ecuador, and Peru	Size: Habitat: Diet:	LC
Olivaceous thornbill	Chalcostigma olivaceum (Lawrence, 1864)	Bolivia and Peru	Size: Habitat: Diet:	LC
Blue-mantled thornbill	Chalcostigma stanleyi (Bourcier, 1851) Three subspecies: C. s. stanleyi (Bourcier, 1851); C. s. versigulare (Zimmer, 1924); C. s. vulcani (Gould, 1852)	Bolivia, Ecuador, and Peru	Size: Habitat: Diet:	LC
Bronze-tailed thornbill	Chalcostigma heteropogon (Boissonneau, 1840)	Colombia and Venezuela	Size: Habitat: Diet:	LC
Rainbow-bearded thornbill Male Female	Chalcostigma herrani (Delattre & Bourcier, 1846) Two subspecies: C. h. tolimae Kleinschmidt, O, 1927; C. h. herrani (Delattre & Bourcier, 1846)	Colombia, Ecuador, and Peru	Size: Habitat: Diet:	LC
