= Espeletia moritziana =

Scientific classification
- Kingdom: Plantae
- Clade: Tracheophytes
- Clade: Angiosperms
- Clade: Eudicots
- Clade: Asterids
- Order: Asterales
- Family: Asteraceae
- Genus: Espeletia
- Species: E. moritziana

Binomial name
- Espeletia moritziana Sch.Bip. ex Wedd.

Synonyms
- Coespeletia moritziana (Wedd.) Cuatrec.

Species of flowering plant

Espeletia moritziana is a resinous shrub of the genus Espeletia native to the Andes of Venezuela. It grows at an altitude of between 3700 and 4400 metres. The stem is woolly, the leaves are elongated, and the flowers are yellow. Kaurenic acid, a cytotoxic compound, has been isolated from the leaves of the plant.
