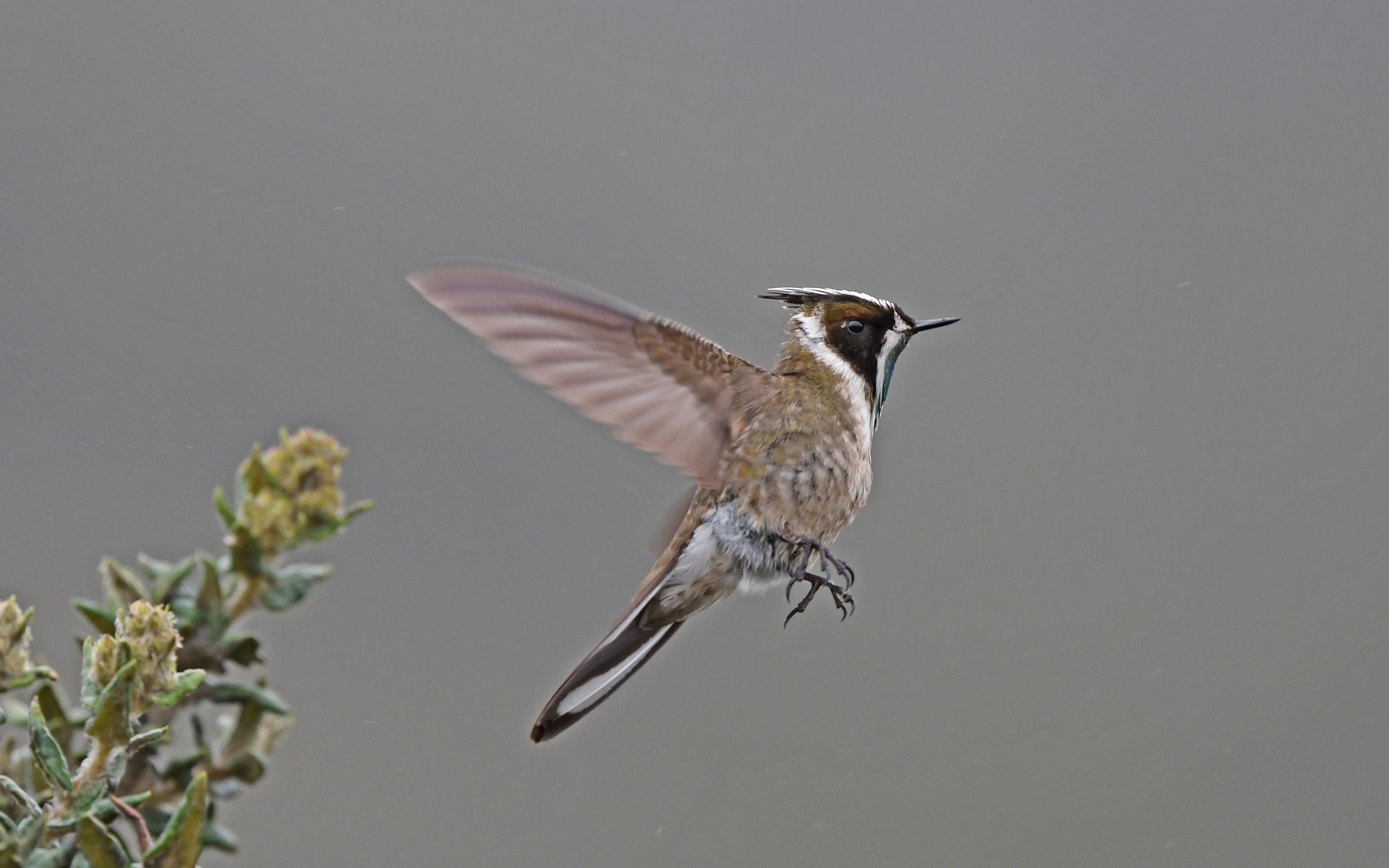
- Green-bearded helmetcrest, Oxypogon guerinii

Scientific classification
- Domain: Eukaryota
- Kingdom: Animalia
- Phylum: Chordata
- Class: Aves
- Clade: Strisores
- Order: Apodiformes
- Family: Trochilidae
- Tribe: Lesbiini
- Genus: Oxypogon; Gould, 1848

Type species
- Ornismya guerinii Boissonneau, 1840

Species
- see text

= Bearded helmetcrest =

Genus of birds

The bearded helmetcrests (Oxypogon) are a genus of hummingbird in the family Trochilidae. They are found in Colombia and Venezuela. Primary natural habitat is subtropical or tropical high-altitude grassland, known as páramo. The genus contains four species.

== Taxonomy and species list ==
The genus Oxypogon was introduced in 1848 by the English ornithologist John Gould. The type species was subsequently designated as the green-bearded helmetcrest. The genus name combines the Ancient Greek oxus meaning "sharp" or "pointed" with pōgōn meaning "beard".

The genus contains four species:

Genus Oxypogon – Gould, 1848 – four species
Common name	Scientific name and subspecies	Range	Size and ecology	IUCN status and estimated population
White-bearded helmetcrest	Oxypogon lindenii (Parzudaki, 1845)	Venezuela	Size: Habitat: Diet:	LC
Green-bearded helmetcrest	Oxypogon guerinii (Boissonneau, 1840)	Colombia	Size: Habitat: Diet:	LC
Blue-bearded helmetcrest	Oxypogon cyanolaemus Salvin & Godman, 1880	northern Colombia	Size: Habitat: Diet:	CR
Buffy helmetcrest	Oxypogon stuebelii Meyer, AB, 1884	Colombia	Size: Habitat: Diet:	VU

These four species were formerly all considered as subspecies of what was known as the bearded helmetcrest (Oxypogon guerinii). The bearded helmetcrest was split into four separate species based on a study of biometric and plumage data published in 2013.

A study of mitochondrial DNA of hummingbirds shows it to be most closely related to the bearded mountaineer (Oreonympha nobilis) and the rufous-capped thornbill (Chalcostigma ruficeps). The other member of the genus Chalcostigma lay outside the group, suggesting the genus might need revising in the future.

== Description ==
The most common species, the white-bearded helmetcrest, measures 11.4 cm (4.5 in) in length, it is a small hummingbird with a very small 8 mm (0.31 in) bill. The adult male has a distinctive pointed black crest and a shaggy white beard. The face and cheeks are blackish, rendering a triangular shape with the white fronted crest and white beard. The underparts are a dull green-grey. The female lacks the beard and crest.

The species of bearded helmetcrests are found in the Andes, ranging from altitudes of 3,600 to 4,500 m (11,800 to 14,800 ft) in Venezuela, and 3,200 to 5,200 m (10,500 to 17,100 ft) in Colombia. Its main habitat is the páramo, but can descend to the treeline outside of breeding season.

All species often perch on boulders and flit between low-flowering shrubs, visiting the flowers of the genera Espeletia, Echeveria, Siphocampylus, Castilleja and Draba.

All species breed during the rainy season, and nest in the daisy Espeletia or build a nest of material from the daisy in a cliff or bank.
