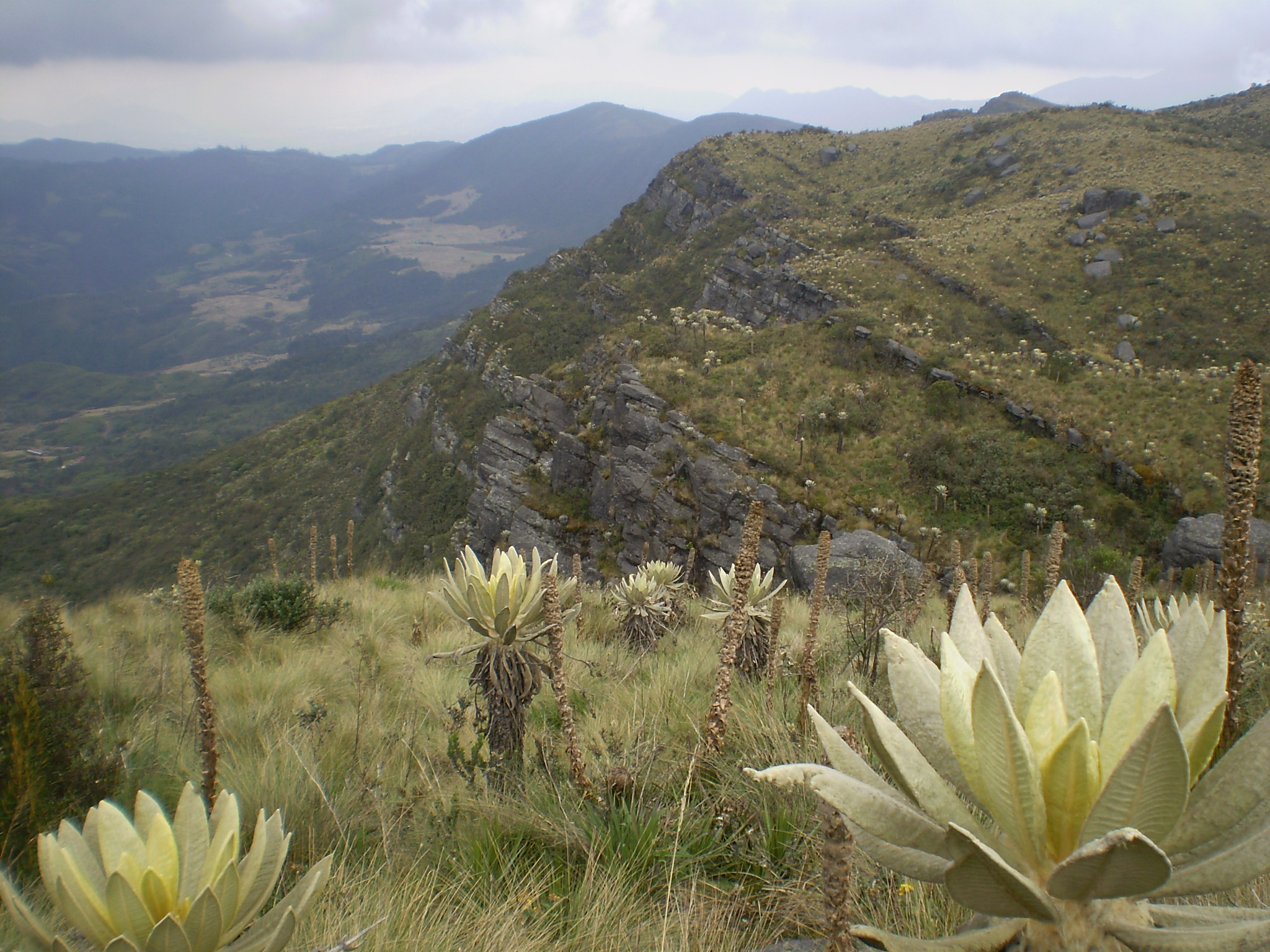
- Espeletia in Páramo de Guerrero (Colombia)

Scientific classification
- Kingdom: Plantae
- Clade: Tracheophytes
- Clade: Angiosperms
- Clade: Eudicots
- Clade: Asterids
- Order: Asterales
- Family: Asteraceae
- Subfamily: Asteroideae
- Tribe: Millerieae
- Subtribe: Espeletiinae
- Genus: Espeletia; Mutis ex Bonpl. in Humb. & Bonpl.

Synonyms
- Carramboa Cuatrec.; Coespeletia Cuatrec.; Espeletiopsis Cuatrec.; Libanothamnus Ernst; Paramiflos Cuatrec.; Ruilopezia Cuatrec.; Tamania Cuatrec.

= Espeletia =

Genus of plants

Espeletia, commonly known as 'frailejones' ("big monks"), is a genus of perennial subshrubs, in the family Asteraceae. The genus, which is native mainly to Colombia, Venezuela and Ecuador, was first formally described in 1808. The genus was named after the viceroy of New Granada, José Manuel de Ezpeleta.

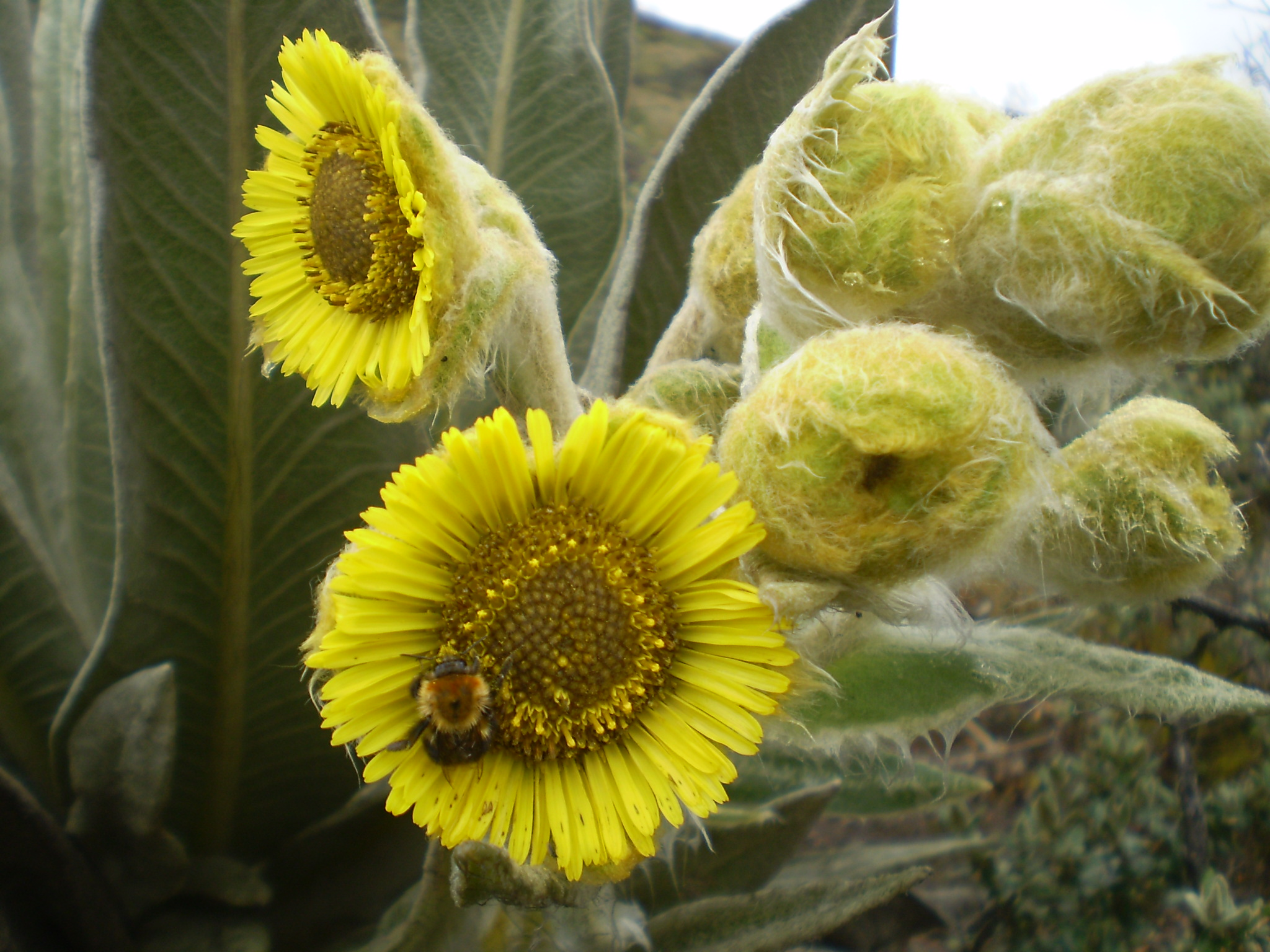
Espeletia grandiflora

The plants live at high altitude in páramo ecosystems. The trunk is thick, with succulent hairy leaves disposed in a dense spiral pattern. Marcescent leaves help protect the plants from cold. The flowers are usually yellow, similar to daisies. Some members of the genus exhibit a caulirosulate growth habit.

The frailejón plant is endangered due to destruction of the páramo for agricultural purposes, especially potato crops. This activity continues, despite the Colombian government declaring it illegal. Since about 2010 the plants have also come under attack by beetle larvae, a moth and a fungus, some new to science but suspected to be related to climate change which allows lower-altitude species to flourish.

Espeletia is well known for contributing to the world in water sustainability by capturing water vapor from passing clouds in its spongy trunk and releasing it through the roots into the soil, thus helping to create vast high-altitude subterranean water deposits and lakes that will eventually form rivers.

ESPELETIA (Ethics, Society, Politics, Legislation, Environment, Legislation, Economy, Technology, International, Arts) is also the name/mnemonic of a current futurology tool.

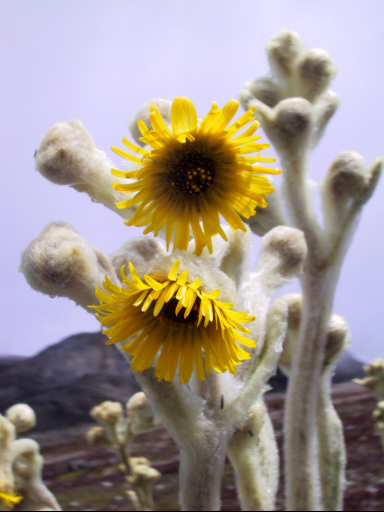
Espeletia schultzii

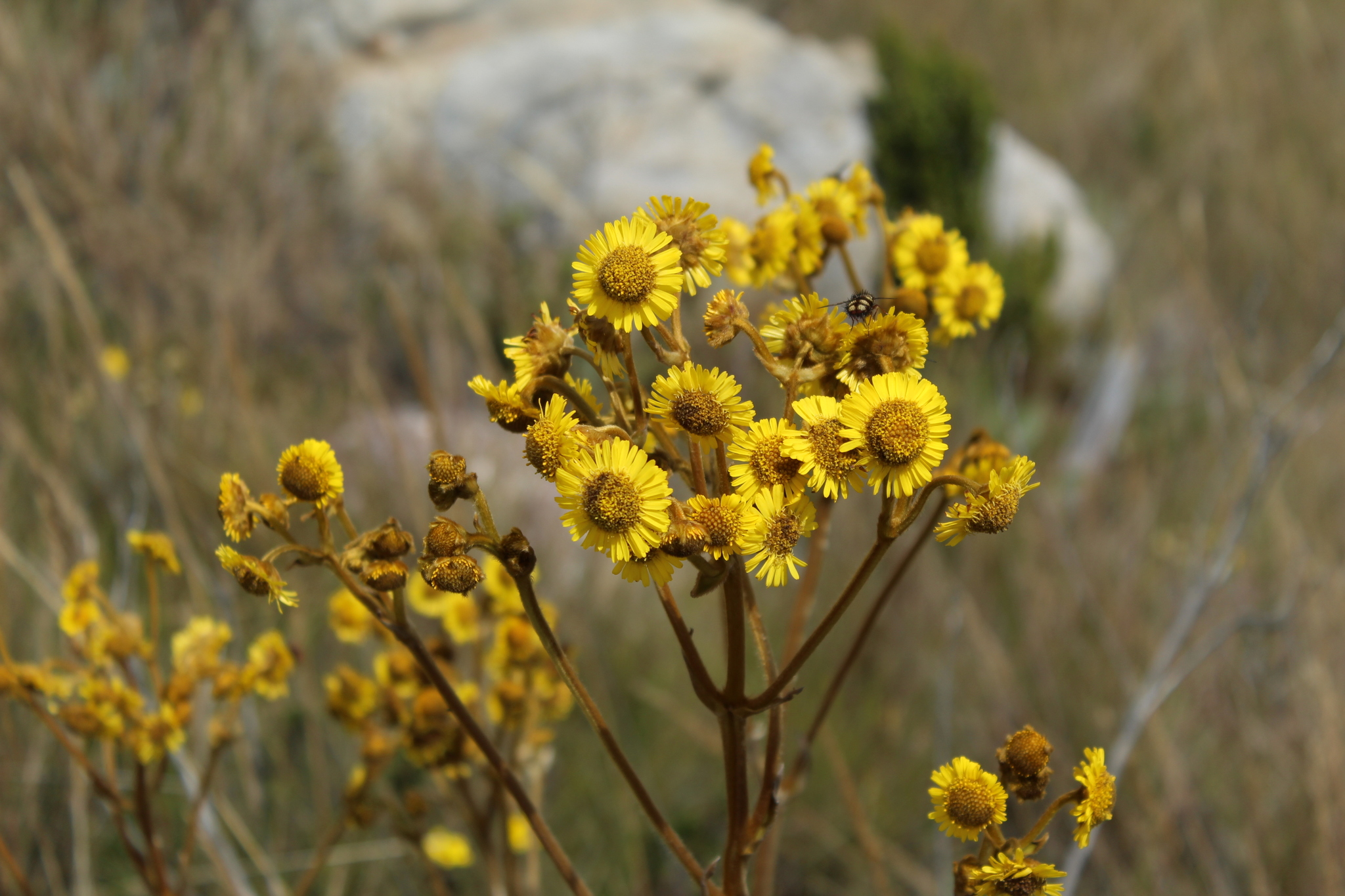
Espeletia boyacensis, Duitama, Colombia

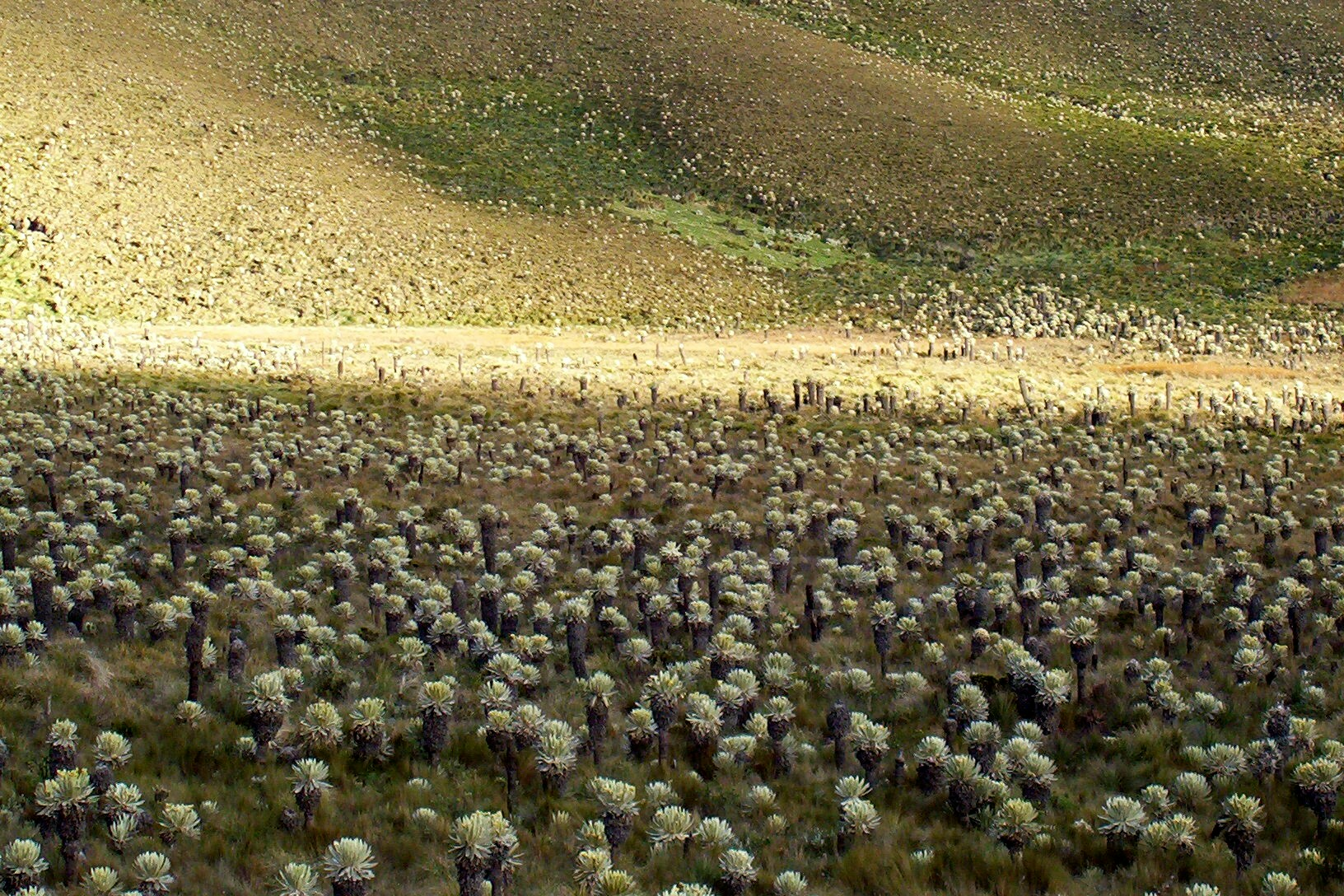
Espeletia pycnophylla

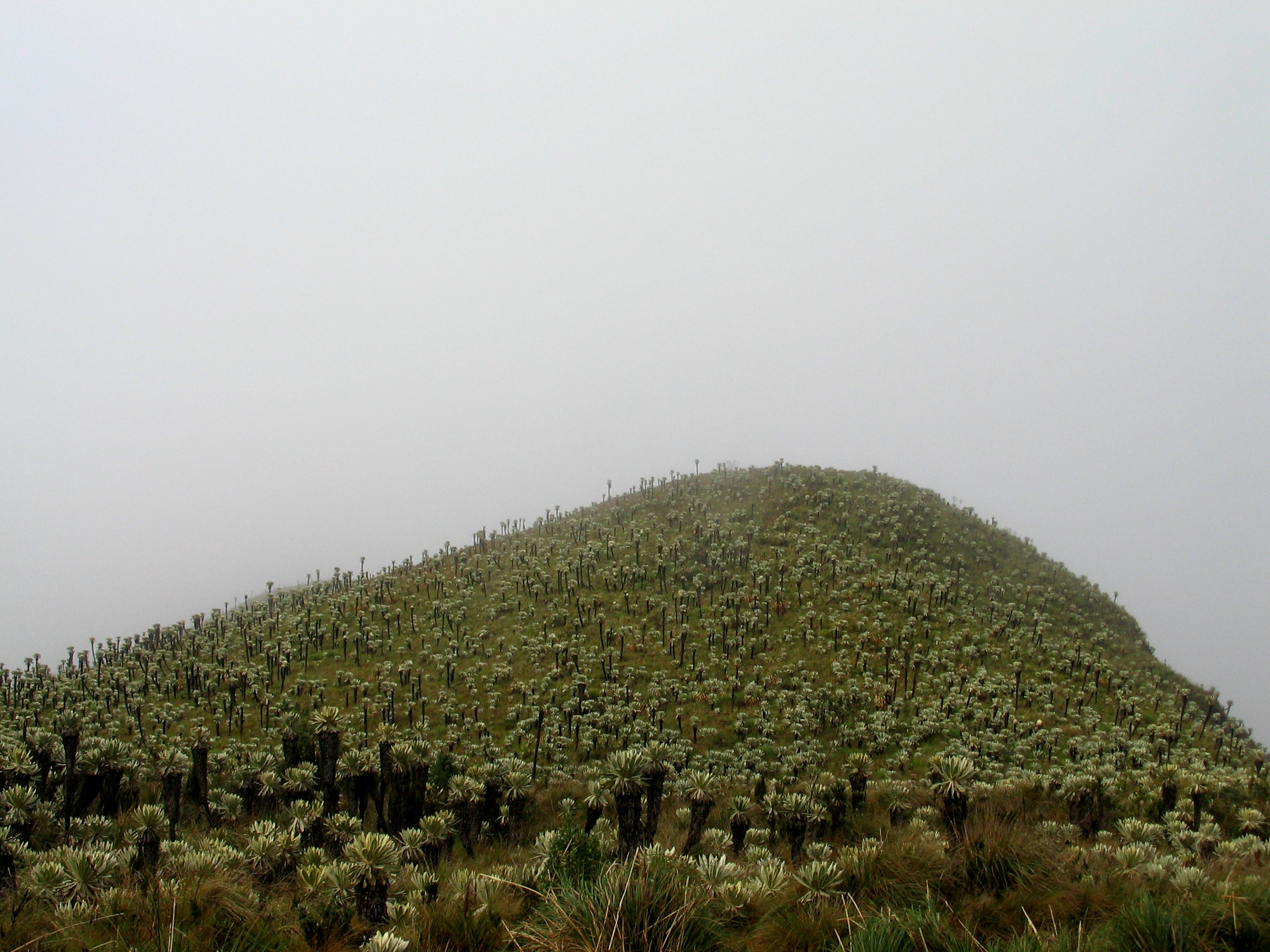
Espeletia pycnophylla

== Species ==
Species accepted by Plants of the World Online as of December 2022:

- Espeletia albarregensis (Cuatrec.) Mavárez
- Espeletia × algodonosa Aristeg.
- Espeletia × almorzana Cuatrec.
- Espeletia angustifolia Cuatrec.
- Espeletia annemariana Cuatrec.
- Espeletia arbelaezii Cuatrec.
- Espeletia arborea Aristeg.
- Espeletia argentea Bonpl.
- Espeletia ariana Rodr.-Cabeza & S.Díaz
- Espeletia aristeguietana Cuatrec.
- Espeletia atropurpurea A.C.Sm.
- Espeletia × aurantia Aristeg.
- Espeletia azucarina Cuatrec.
- Espeletia badilloi Cuatrec.
- Espeletia banksiifolia Sch.Bip. & Ettingsh. ex Wedd.
- Espeletia barclayana Cuatrec.
- Espeletia batata Cuatrec.
- Espeletia betancurii (Rodr.-Cabeza, S.Díaz & Gal.-Tar.) Mavárez
- Espeletia × bogotensis Cuatrec.
- Espeletia boyacensis Cuatrec.
- Espeletia brachyaxiantha S.Díaz
- Espeletia bracteosa Standl.
- Espeletia brassicoidea Cuatrec.
- Espeletia bromelioides Cuatrec.
- Espeletia cabrerensis Cuatrec.
- Espeletia cachaluensis Rodr.-Cabeza & S.Díaz
- Espeletia caldasii Cuatrec.
- Espeletia canescens A.C.Sm.
- Espeletia cardonae Cuatrec.
- Espeletia cayetana (Cuatrec.) Cuatrec.
- Espeletia chardonii A.C.Sm.
- Espeletia chocontana Cuatrec.
- Espeletia chontalensis Rodr.-Cabeza & S.Díaz
- Espeletia cleefii Cuatrec.
- Espeletia colombiana Cuatrec.
- Espeletia × coloradarum Cuatrec.
- Espeletia congestiflora Cuatrec.
- Espeletia conglomerata A.C.Sm.
- Espeletia corymbosa Bonpl.
- Espeletia × cristalinensis Cuatrec.
- Espeletia cuatrecasasii Ruíz-Terán & López-Fig.
- Espeletia × cuniculorum Cuatrec.
- Espeletia curialensis Cuatrec.
- Espeletia diazii (Diazgr. & L.R.Sánchez) Mavárez
- Espeletia discoidea Cuatrec.
- Espeletia divisoriensis (Cuatrec.) Mavárez
- Espeletia dugandii Cuatrec.
- Espeletia elongata A.C.Sm.
- Espeletia emmanuelis (Cuatrec.) Mavárez
- Espeletia episcopalis Rodr.-Cabeza & S.Díaz
- Espeletia estanislana Cuatrec.
- Espeletia figueirasii Cuatrec.
- Espeletia floccosa Standl.
- Espeletia formosa S.Díaz & Rodr.-Cabeza
- Espeletia frontinoensis Cuatrec.
- Espeletia funckii Sch.Bip. ex Wedd.
- Espeletia garciae Cuatrec.
- Espeletia × garcibarrigae Cuatrec.
- Espeletia glandulosa Cuatrec.
- Espeletia grandiflora Bonpl.
- Espeletia griffinii Ruíz-Terán & López-Fig.
- Espeletia grisea Standl.
- Espeletia × gritaensis (Cuatrec.) Mavárez
- Espeletia guacharaca S.Díaz
- Espeletia × guascensis Cuatrec.
- Espeletia hanburyana Cuatrec.
- Espeletia hartwegiana Sch.Bip. ex Cuatrec.
- Espeletia idroboi Cuatrec.
- Espeletia incana Cuatrec.
- Espeletia insignis Cuatrec.
- Espeletia jabonensis Cuatrec.
- Espeletia jahnii Standl.
- Espeletia × jajoensis Aristeg.
- Espeletia jaramilloi S.Díaz
- Espeletia jimenez-quesadae Cuatrec.
- Espeletia × josephensis Cuatrec.
- Espeletia killipii Cuatrec.
- Espeletia laxiflora (S.Díaz & Rodr.-Cabeza) Mavárez
- Espeletia leucactina Cuatrec.
- Espeletia lindenii Sch.Bip. ex Wedd.
- Espeletia liscanoana Cuatrec.
- Espeletia lopezii Cuatrec.
- Espeletia lopezpalacii Ruíz-Terán & López-Fig.
- Espeletia lucida Aristeg.
- Espeletia marcescens S.F.Blake
- Espeletia margarita Cuatrec.
- Espeletia marnixiana S.Díaz & Pedraza
- Espeletia marthae Cuatrec.
- Espeletia × meridensis Cuatrec.
- Espeletia mirabilis S.Díaz & Rodr.-Cabeza
- Espeletia miradorensis (Cuatrec.) Cuatrec.
- Espeletia moritziana Sch.Bip. ex Wedd.
- Espeletia muiska Cuatrec.
- Espeletia murilloi Cuatrec.
- Espeletia mutabilis S.Díaz & Rodr.-Cabeza
- Espeletia nana Cuatrec.
- Espeletia nemekenei Cuatrec.
- Espeletia neriifolia (Bonpl. ex Humb.) Sch.Bip. ex Wedd.
- Espeletia occidentalis A.C.Sm.
- Espeletia occulta S.F.Blake
- Espeletia oswaldiana S.Díaz
- Espeletia × pachoana Cuatrec.
- Espeletia paipana S.Díaz & Pedraza
- Espeletia paltonioides Standl.
- Espeletia palustris (Diazgr. & Morillo) Mavárez
- Espeletia pannosa Standl.
- Espeletia parvula (Cuatrec.) Mavárez
- Espeletia perijaensis Cuatrec.
- Espeletia pescana (S.Díaz) S.Díaz
- Espeletia petiolata Cuatrec.
- Espeletia pisbana S.Díaz & Rodr.-Cabeza
- Espeletia pleiochasia Cuatrec.
- Espeletia × pozoensis Cuatrec.
- Espeletia praefrontina Cuatrec.
- Espeletia praesidentis Diazgr. & L.R.Sánchez
- Espeletia pulcherrima Rodr.-Cabeza & S.Díaz
- Espeletia purpurascens Cuatrec.
- Espeletia pycnophylla Cuatrec.
- Espeletia rabanalensis (S.Díaz & Rodr.-Cabeza) Mavárez
- Espeletia ramosa Mavárez & M.T.Becerra
- Espeletia raquirensis Rodr.-Cabeza & S.Díaz
- Espeletia restricta Alzate & S.Giraldo
- Espeletia roberti Cuatrec.
- Espeletia × rodriguezii Cuatrec.
- Espeletia rositae Cuatrec.
- Espeletia ruizii Cuatrec.
- Espeletia sanchezii (S.Díaz & Obando) Mavárez
- Espeletia santanderensis A.C.Sm.
- Espeletia schultesiana Cuatrec.
- Espeletia schultzii Wedd.
- Espeletia sclerophylla Cuatrec.
- Espeletia semiglobulata Cuatrec.
- Espeletia soroca S.Díaz & Rodr.-Cabeza
- Espeletia spectabilis Cuatrec.
- Espeletia spicata Sch.Bip. ex Wedd.
- Espeletia standleyana A.C.Sm.
- Espeletia steyermarkii Cuatrec.
- Espeletia summapacis Cuatrec.
- Espeletia × tachirensis Aristeg.
- Espeletia tamana Cuatrec.
- Espeletia tapirophila Cuatrec.
- Espeletia tenorae Aristeg.
- Espeletia thyrsiformis A.C.Sm.
- Espeletia tibamoensis Rodr.-Cabeza & S.Díaz
- Espeletia tillettii Cuatrec.
- Espeletia timotensis Cuatrec.
- Espeletia trianae Cuatrec.
- Espeletia trujillensis Cuatrec.
- Espeletia tunjana Cuatrec.
- Espeletia ulotricha Cuatrec.
- Espeletia uribei Cuatrec.
- Espeletia usubillagae (Cuatrec.) Mavárez
- Espeletia × verdeana Cuatrec.
- Espeletia vergarae (Cuatrec. & López-Fig.) Mavárez
- Espeletia viridis Aristeg.
- Espeletia weddellii Sch.Bip. ex Wedd.
- Espeletia × wurdackii Ruíz-Terán & López-Fig.
