= Papilio hellanichus =

Scientific classification
- Kingdom: Animalia
- Phylum: Arthropoda
- Clade: Pancrustacea
- Class: Insecta
- Order: Lepidoptera
- Family: Papilionidae
- Genus: Papilio
- Species: P. hellanichus

Binomial name
- Papilio hellanichus Hewitson, 1868

Species of butterfly

Papilio hellanichus is a species of Neotropical swallowtail butterfly from the genus Papilio that is found in Brazil, Uruguay and Argentina.

The yellow spots on the upper surface of the wings are large. The insect reminds one superficially of P. machaon, with which, however, it is not closely allied. The markings of the under surface as well as the structure prove that P. hellanichus is the southern representative of P. scamander. The cell has also on the upper surface a yellow spot, which on the forewing is sometimes very small, on the hindwing always large. The spots of the discal band have almost all reddish tips. Female quite similar to the male.
