= Papilio birchallii =

Scientific classification
- Kingdom: Animalia
- Phylum: Arthropoda
- Clade: Pancrustacea
- Class: Insecta
- Order: Lepidoptera
- Family: Papilionidae
- Genus: Papilio
- Species: P. birchallii

Binomial name
- Papilio birchallii Hewitson, 1863

Synonyms
- Papilio birchalli godmani Rothschild & Jordan, 1906 (preocc. Röber, 1891); Papilio birchallii devriesi Brown & Wilson, 1994 (repl. name)

Species of butterfly

Papilio birchallii is a species of Neotropical swallowtail butterfly from the genus Papilio that is found in Colombia, Panama and Costa Rica.

== Description ==
Male: body black, claspers usually with pale yellow spot. Forewing above with 2 rows of spots before the margin; the anterior spots of the proximal row more or less indistinct; hindwing with broad discal band and a row of submarginal spots; the markings for the most part greenish; tooth of the 3. radial only a little more projecting than the other marginal teeth. Beneath the forewing has a cell-spot, an oblique row of discal spots and a row of submarginal spots abbreviated anteriorly; on the hindwing is a discal and a submarginal row of red spots, the middle discal spots small, the last one large and yellowish white. In the female the markings of the upperside are more bluish and the discal band of the hindwing is very broad.

== Biology ==
The larvae feed on Hernandia didymanthera.

== Subspecies ==
- Papilio birchallii birchallii (Colombia)
- Papilio birchallii bryki Strand, 1930 (Panama, Costa Rica)
