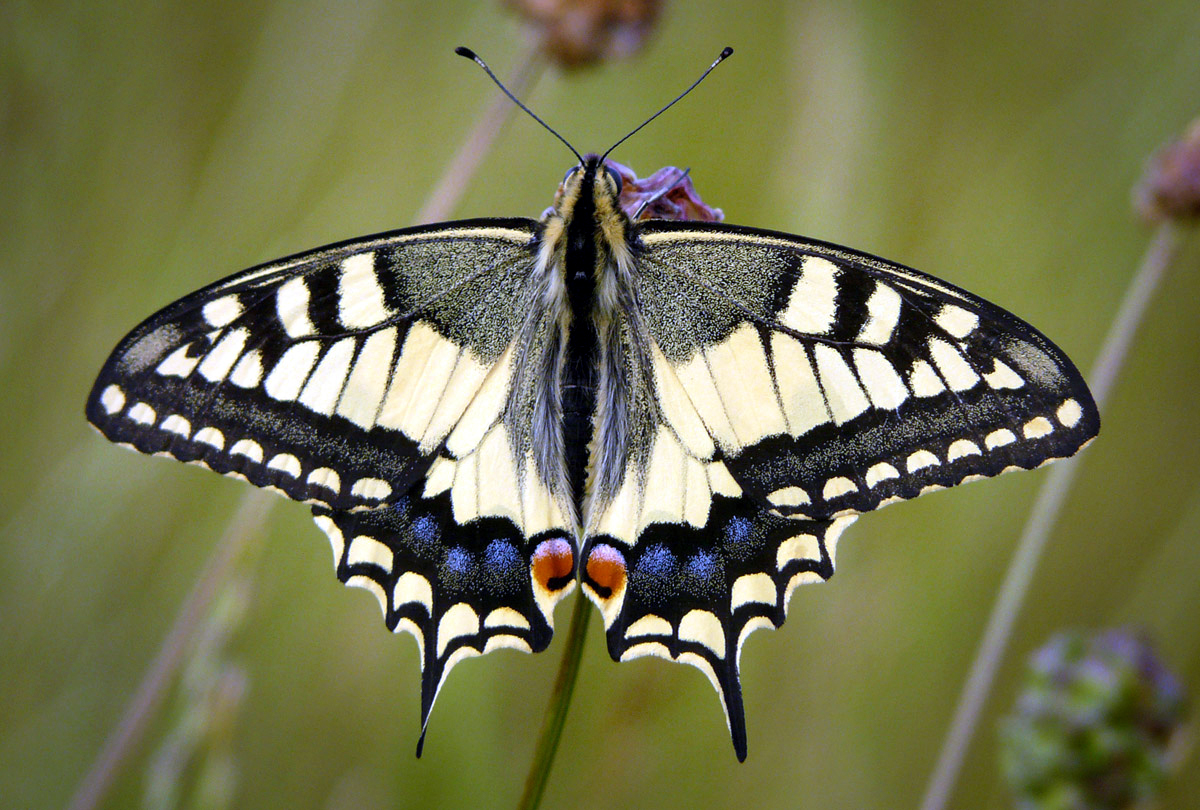
- Papilio machaon

Scientific classification
- Kingdom: Animalia
- Phylum: Arthropoda
- Clade: Pancrustacea
- Class: Insecta
- Order: Lepidoptera
- Family: Papilionidae
- Subfamily: Papilioninae
- Tribe: Papilionini
- Genus: Papilio; Linnaeus, 1758

Type species
- Papilio machaon Linnaeus, 1758

Synonyms
- Achivus Kirby, 1896; Aernauta Berge, 1842; Eques Kirby, 1896; Eques Linnaeus, 1758; Heliconius Linnaeus, 1758; Nymphalis Linnaeus, 1758; Papileo Berkenhout, 1795; Papileo G. Gray, 1832; Papillon Roger, 1826; Papipio Linnaeus, 1764; Papirio Billberg, 1820; Plebejus Linnaeus, 1758; Princeps Hubner, 1807; Roddia Korshunov, 1995

= Papilio =

Genus of butterflies

Papilio is a genus in the swallowtail butterfly family, Papilionidae, as well as the only representative of the tribe Papilionini. The word papilio is Latin for butterfly.

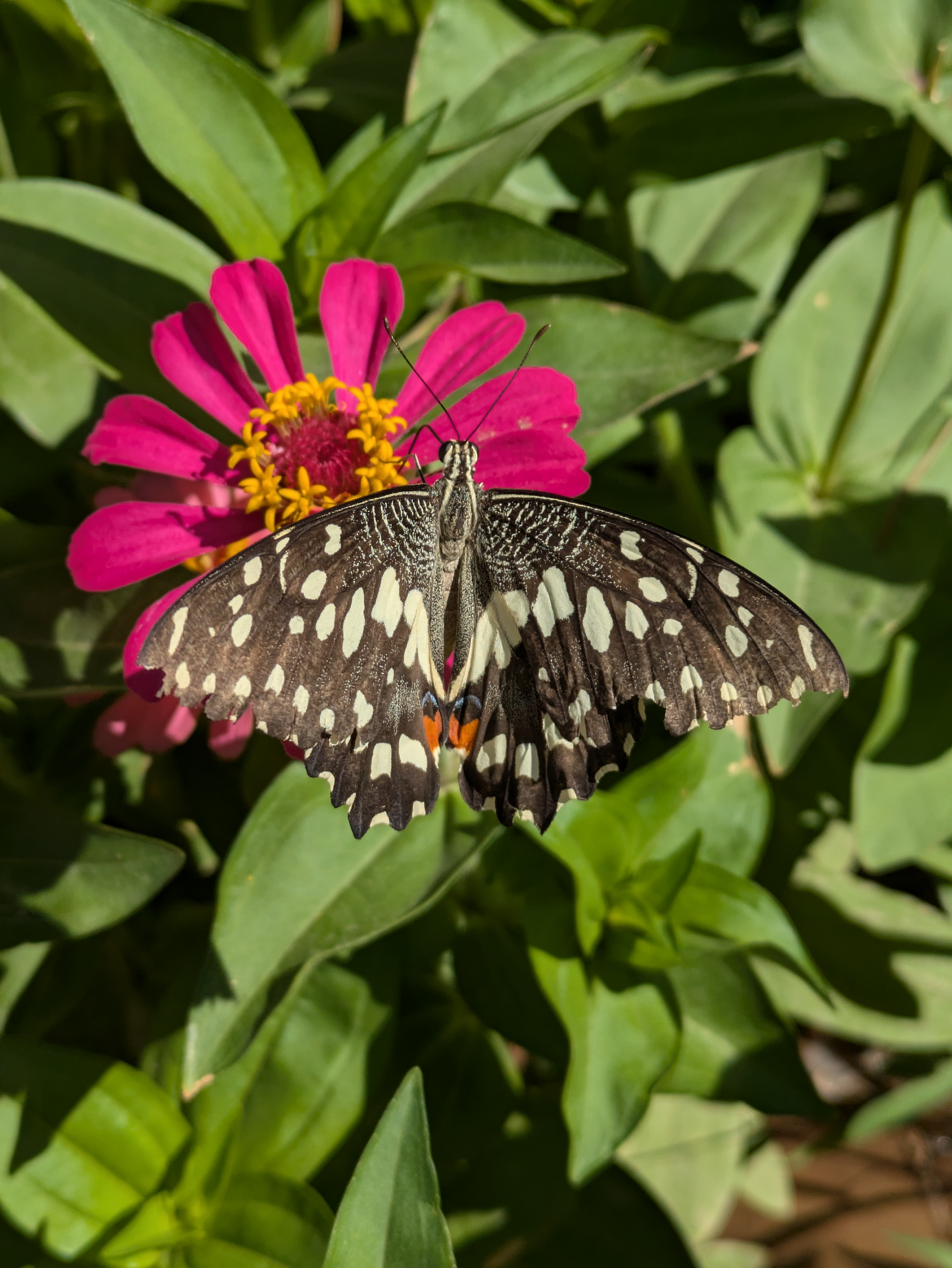
Lime butterfly in Behbahan

It includes the common yellow swallowtail (Papilio machaon), which is widespread in the Northern Hemisphere and the type species of the genus, as well as a number of other well-known North American species such as the western tiger swallowtail (Papilio rutulus). Familiar species elsewhere in the world include the Mormons (Papilio polytes, Papilio polymnestor, Papilio memnon, and Papilio deiphobus) in Asia, the orchard and Ulysses swallowtails in Australia (Papilio aegeus, Papilio ulysses, respectively) and the citrus swallowtail of Africa (Papilio demodocus).

Older classifications of the swallowtails tended to use many rather small genera. More recent classifications have been more conservative, and as a result a number of former genera are now absorbed within Papilio, such as Achillides, Eleppone, Druryia, Heraclides (giant swallowtails), Menelaides, Princeps, Pterourus (tiger swallowtails), and Sinoprinceps. The genus as recognized by modern systems has about 200 members. The genus Chilasa is regarded as a subgenus of Papilio by some workers, as are the baggy-tailed swallowtails (Agehana), although the latter taxon is usually considered a subgenus of Chilasa.

Many of the larvae resemble bird droppings during a development stage. Adults are edible to birds and some species are mimics.

== Ecology ==
In their larval form, members of Papilio typically feed upon plants of Rutaceae including common ornamental and agriculturally important species such as Citrus species, Murraya species, Choisya species and Calodendrum species. Caterpillars sequester terpenoids from their diet to produce a foul smelling oil used in defence.

== Species ==
Listed alphabetically within groups.
subgenus: Papilio Linnaeus, 1758

species group: machaon

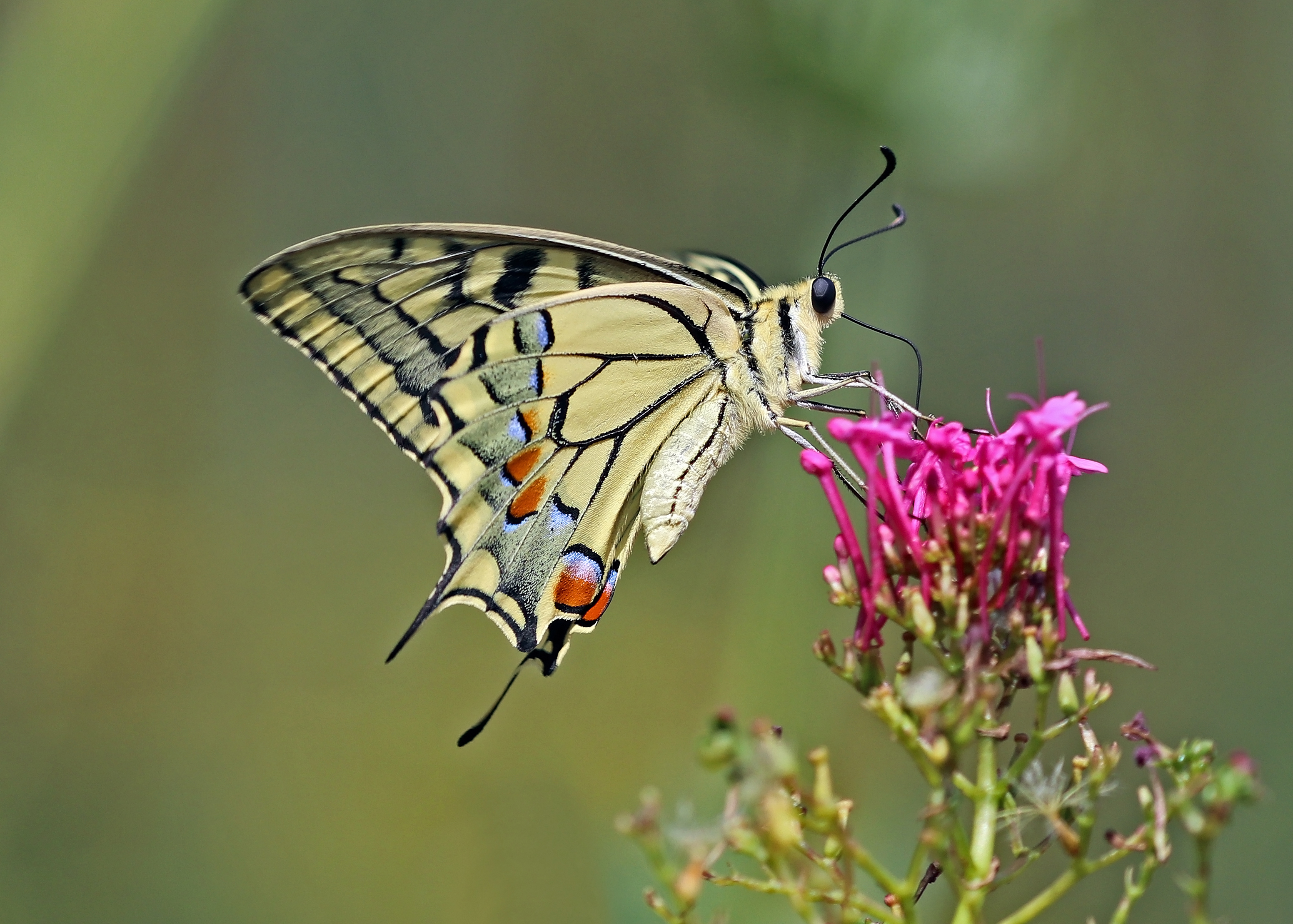
Papilio machaon gorganus

A European paper wasp interacts with a anise swallowtail caterpillar which uses its osmeterium in defense. Most scenes are repeated in closeup at one-fourth speed.

- Papilio alexanor Esper, 1800 – southern swallowtail
- Papilio brevicauda Saunders, 1869 – short-tailed swallowtail
- Papilio hospiton Géné, 1839 – Corsican swallowtail
- Papilio indra Reakirt, 1866 – Indra swallowtail, short-tailed black swallowtail, or cliff swallowtail
- Papilio joanae J. Heitzman, 1973 – Ozark swallowtail
- Papilio machaon Linnaeus, 1758 – Old World swallowtail, common yellow swallowtail, or artemisia swallowtail
- Papilio polyxenes Fabricius, 1775 – black swallowtail, eastern black swallowtail, American swallowtail, or parsnip swallowtail
- Papilio saharae Oberthür, 1879 – Sahara swallowtail
- Papilio zelicaon Lucas, 1852 – anise swallowtail or western swallowtail

subgenus: Princeps Hübner, [1807]

species group: antimachus

- Papilio antimachus Drury, 1782 – Antimachus swallowtail or giant African swallowtail

species group: zalmoxis

- Papilio zalmoxis Hewitson, 1864 – giant blue swallowtail

species group: nireus

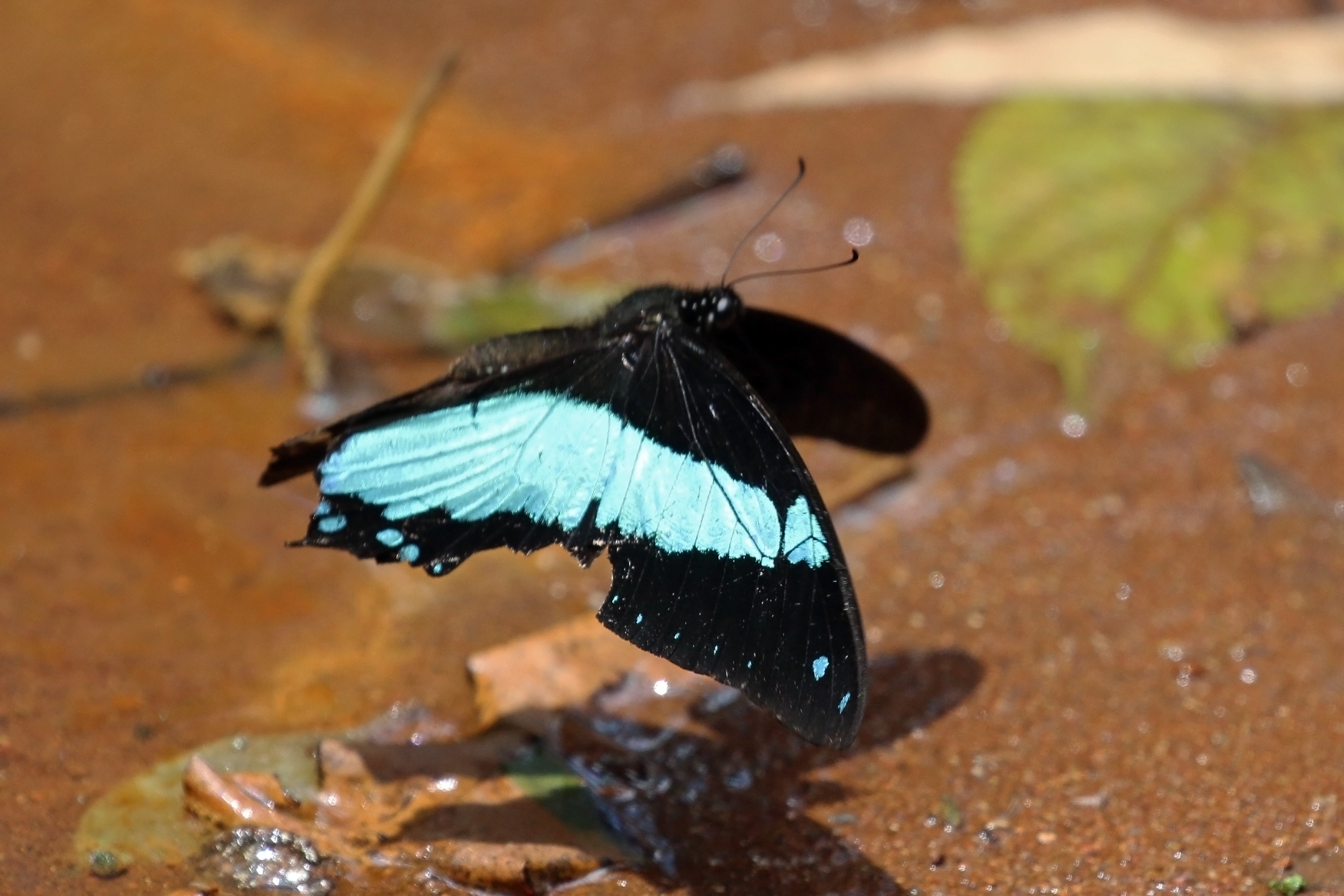
Broad green-banded swallowtail (Papilio chrapkowskii), Kenya

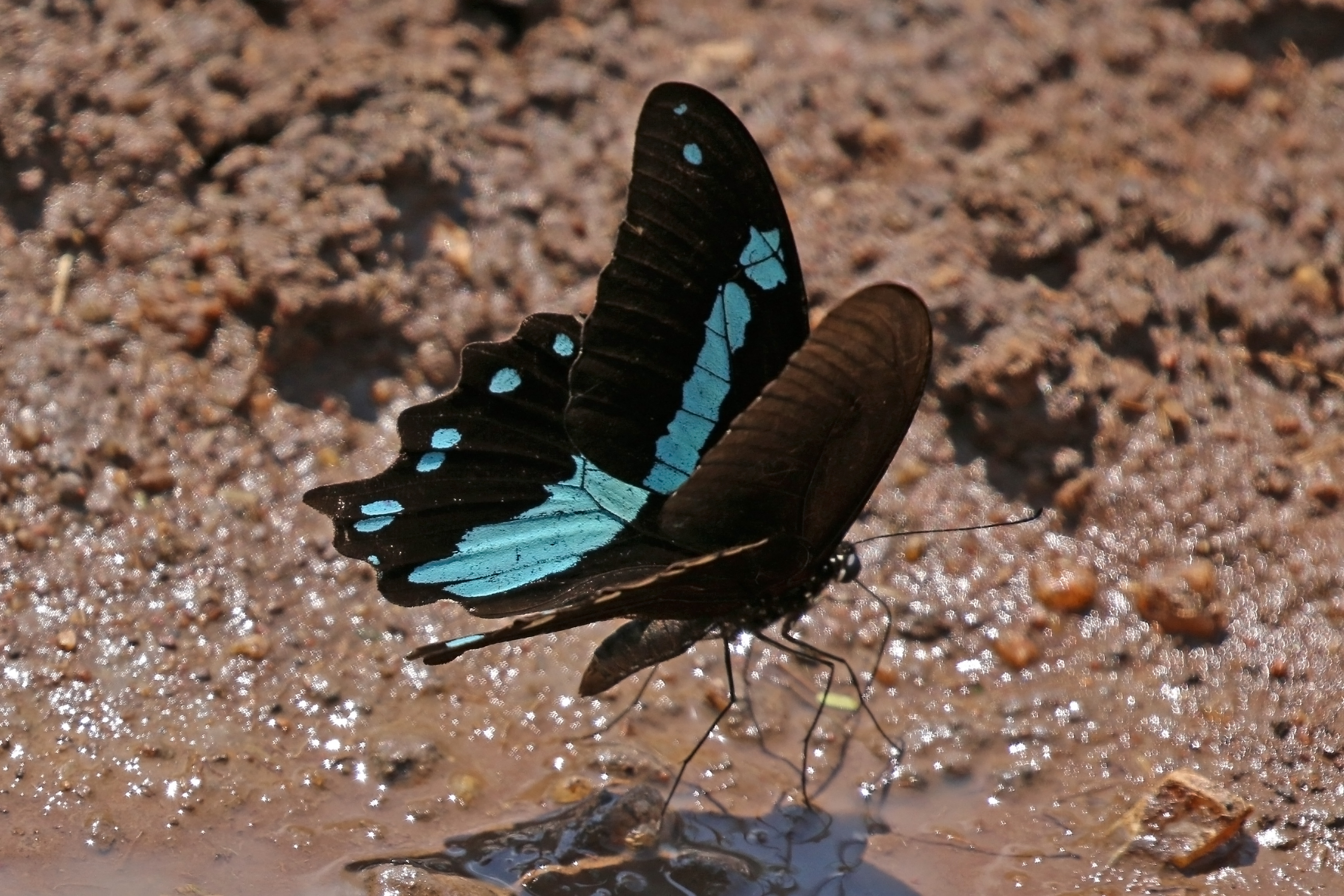
Narrow blue-banded swallowtail (Papilio nireus), Uganda

- Papilio aristophontes Oberthür, 1897
- Papilio charopus Westwood, 1843 – tailed green-banded swallowtail
- Papilio chrapkowskii Suffert, 1904 – broad green-banded swallowtail or Chrapkowski's green-banded swallowtail
- Papilio chrapkowskoides Storace, 1952 – broadly green-banded swallowtail
- Papilio desmondi van Someren, 1939 – Desmond's green-banded swallowtail
- Papilio hornimani Distant, 1879 – Horniman's green-banded swallowtail or Horniman's swallowtail
- Papilio interjectana Vane-Wright, 1995 – Van Someren's green-banded swallowtail
- Papilio nireus Linnaeus, 1758 – green-banded swallowtail, narrow-banded green swallowtail, or African blue-banded swallowtail
- Papilio sosia Rothschild & Jordan, 1903 – medium green-banded swallowtail
- Papilio thuraui Karsch, 1900
- Papilio ufipa Carcasson, 1961
- Papilio wilsoni Rothschild, 1926

species group: cynorta

- Papilio arnoldiana Vane-Wright, 1995
- Papilio cynorta Fabricius, 1793 – mimetic swallowtail
- Papilio plagiatus Aurivillius, 1898 – mountain mimetic swallowtail

species group: dardanus

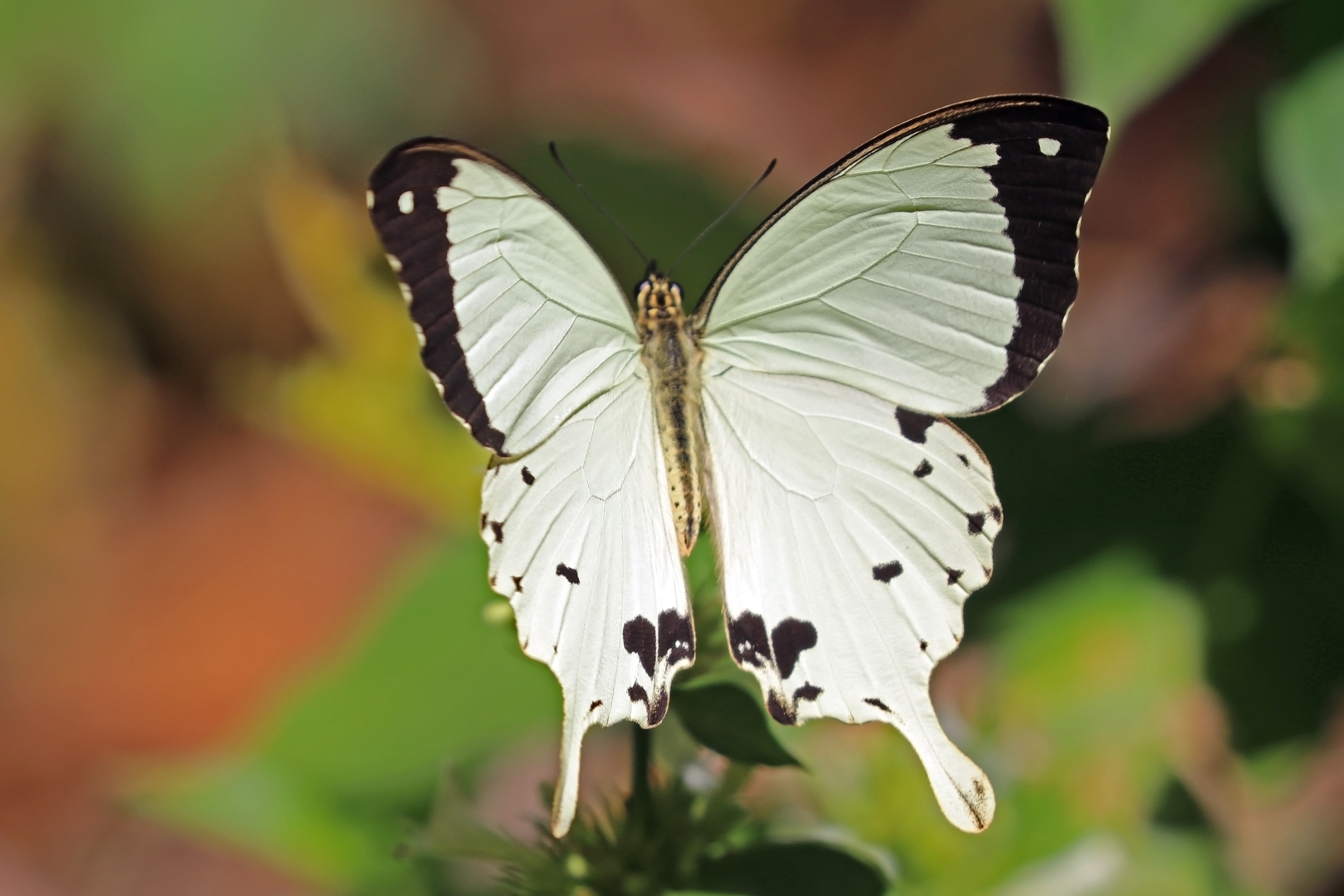
African swallowtail (Papilio dardanus), Ethiopia

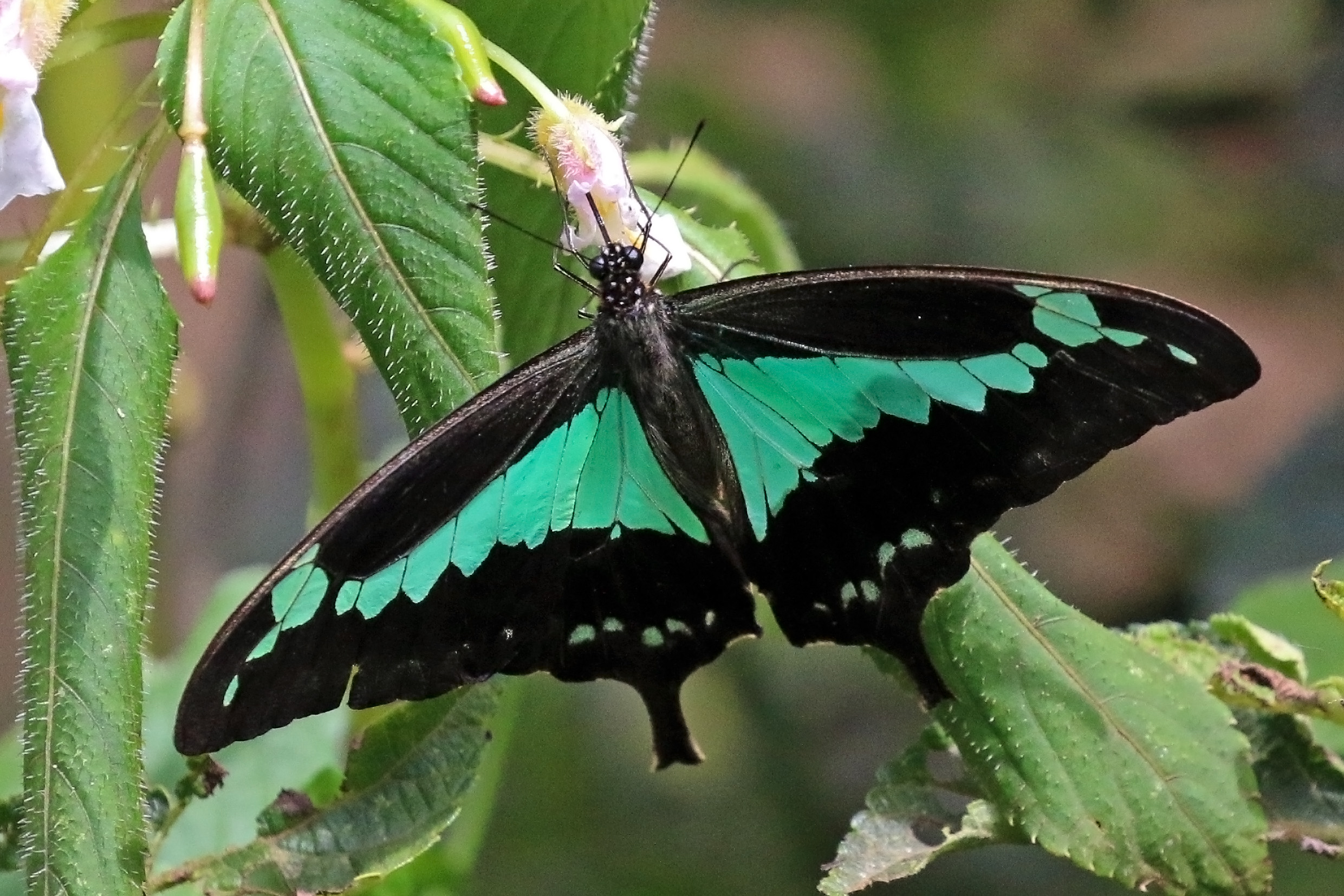
Green-banded swallowtail (Papilio phorcas), Kenya

- Papilio constantinus Ward, 1871 – Constantine's swallowtail
- Papilio dardanus Brown, 1776 – mocker swallowtail, flying handkerchief, or African swallowtail
- Papilio delalandei Godart, [1824]
- Papilio phorcas Cramer, [1775] – apple-green swallowtail or green banded swallowtail
- Papilio rex Oberthür, 1886 – regal swallowtail

species group: zenobia

- Papilio cyproeofila Butler, 1868 – common white-banded swallowtail
- Papilio fernandus Fruhstorfer, 1903
- Papilio filaprae Suffert, 1904
- Papilio gallienus Distant, 1879 – narrow-banded swallowtail
- Papilio mechowi Dewitz, 1881
- Papilio mechowianus Dewitz, 1885
- Papilio nobicea Suffert, 1904 – Volta swallowtail
- Papilio zenobia Fabricius, 1775 – Zenobia swallowtail

species group: demodocus

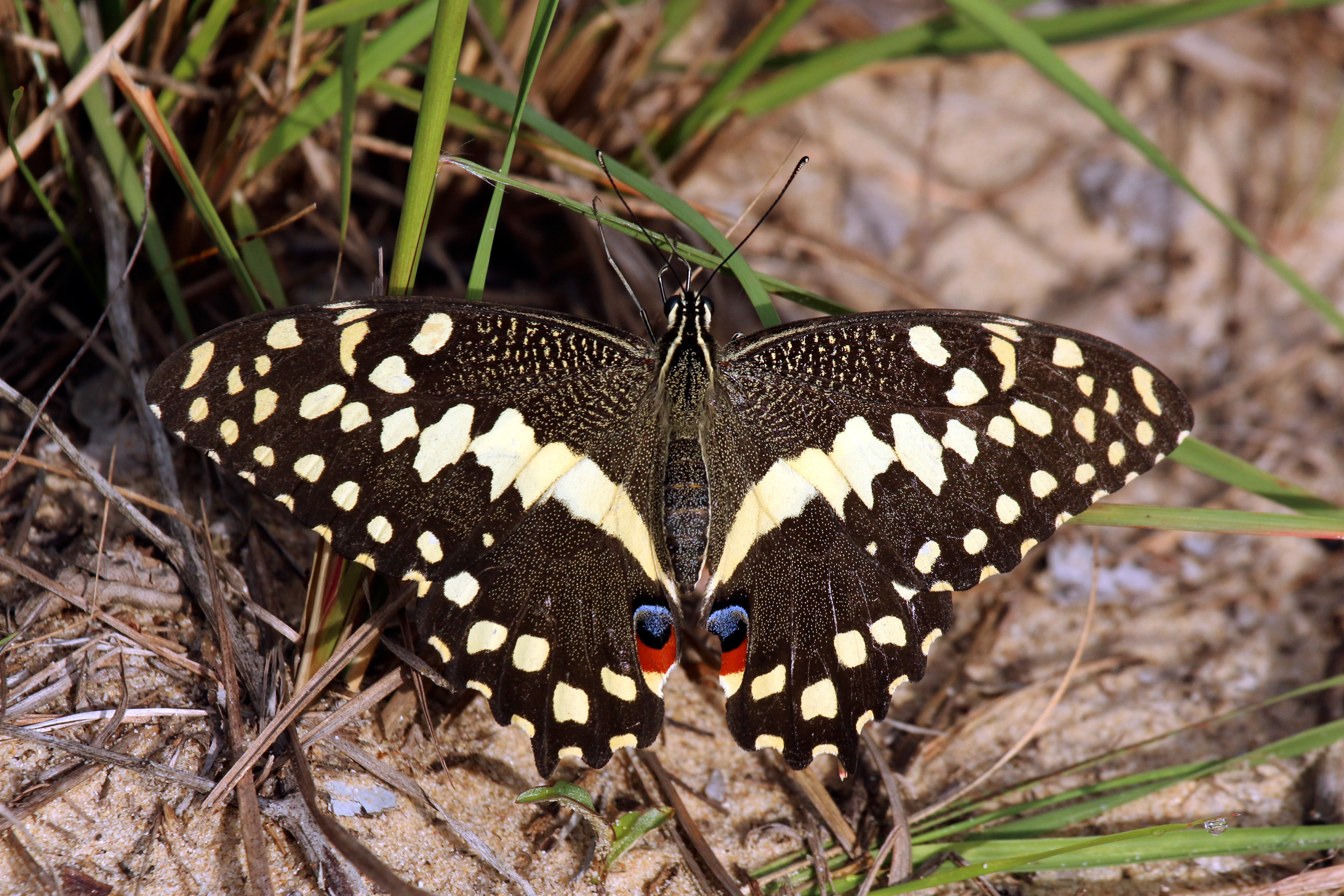
Citrus swallowtail (Papilio demodocus), South Africa

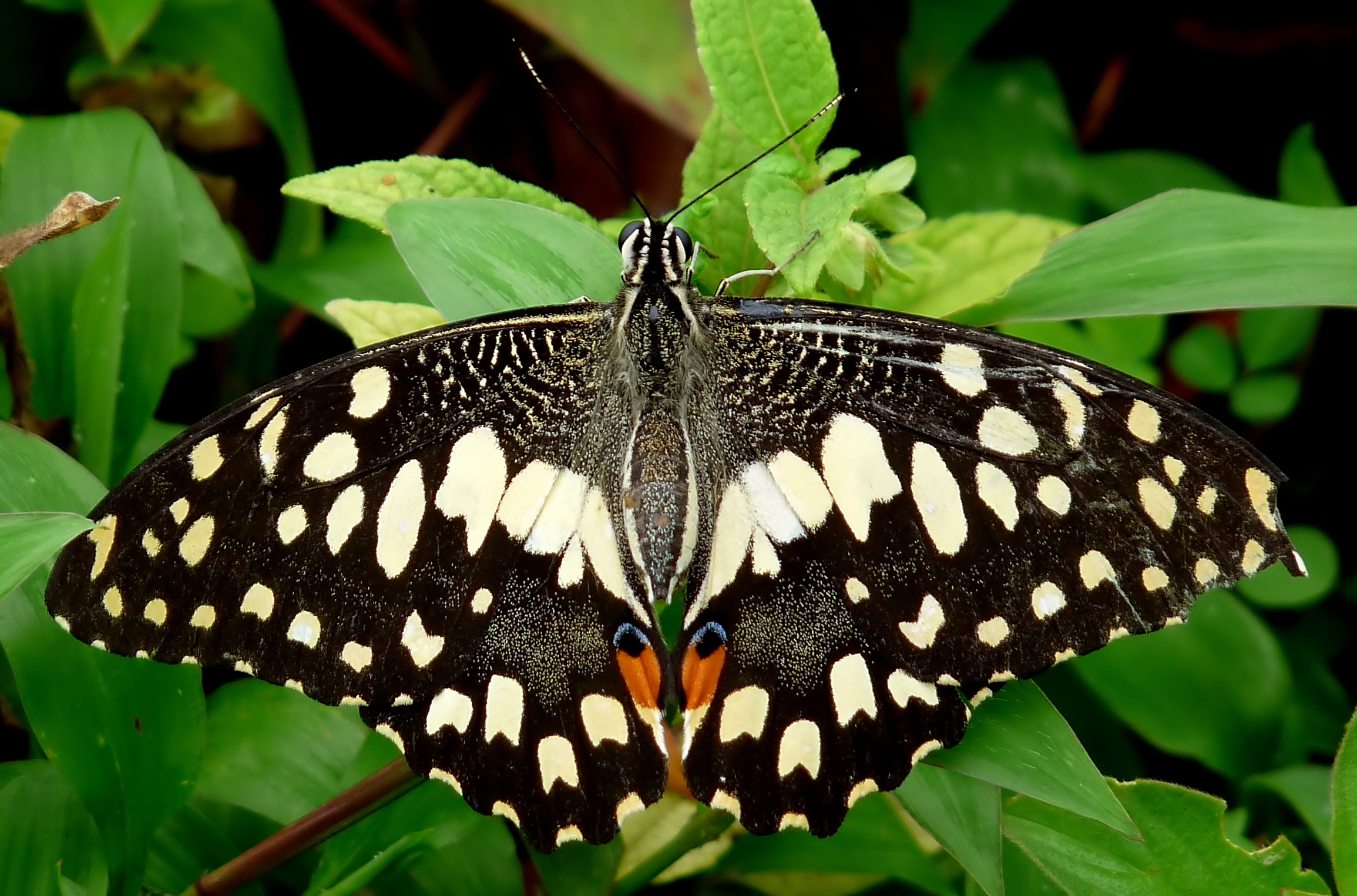
Lime butterfly (Papilio demoleus), India

- Papilio demodocus Esper, 1799 – citrus swallowtail, citrus butterfly, orange dog, or Christmas butterfly
- Papilio demoleus Linnaeus, 1758 – (common) lime swallowtail or lime butterfly
- Papilio erithonioides Grose-Smith, 1891
- Papilio grosesmithi Rothschild, 1926
- Papilio morondavana Grose-Smith, 1891 – Madagascan emperor

species group: echerioides

- Papilio echerioides Trimen, 1868 – white-banded swallowtail
- Papilio fuelleborni Karsch, 1900
- Papilio jacksoni Sharpe, 1891 – Jackson's swallowtail
- Papilio sjoestedti Aurivillius, 1908 – Kilimanjaro swallowtail

species group: oribazus

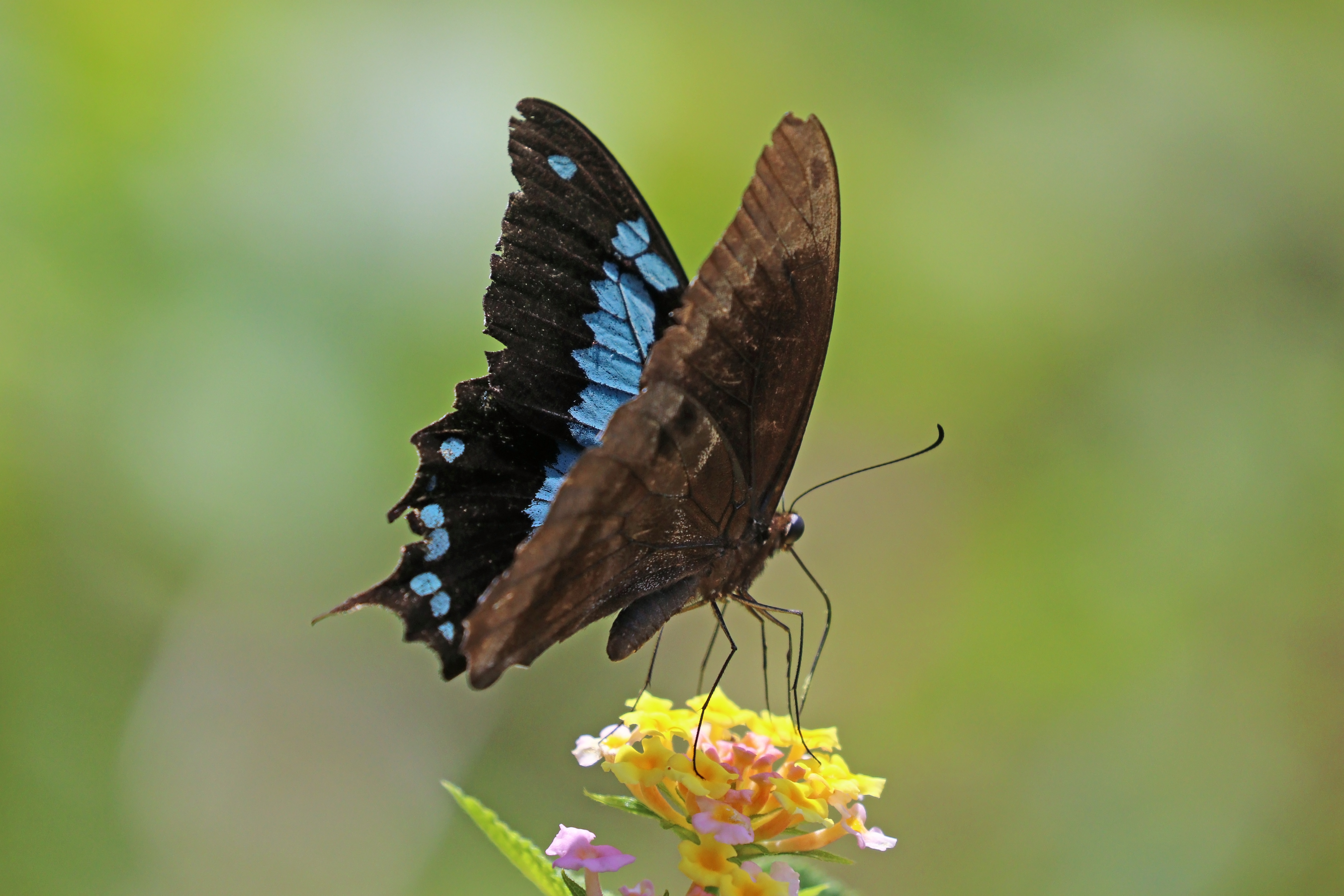
Banded blue swallowtail (Papilio oribazus), Madagascar

- Papilio epiphorbas Boisduval, 1833
- Papilio nobilis Rogenhofer, 1891 – noble swallowtail
- Papilio oribazus Boisduval, 1836

species group: hesperus

- Papilio euphranor Trimen, 1868 – forest swallowtail or bush kite
- Papilio hesperus Westwood, 1843 – emperor swallowtail
- Papilio horribilis Butler, 1874
- Papilio pelodurus Butler, 1896

species group: menestheus

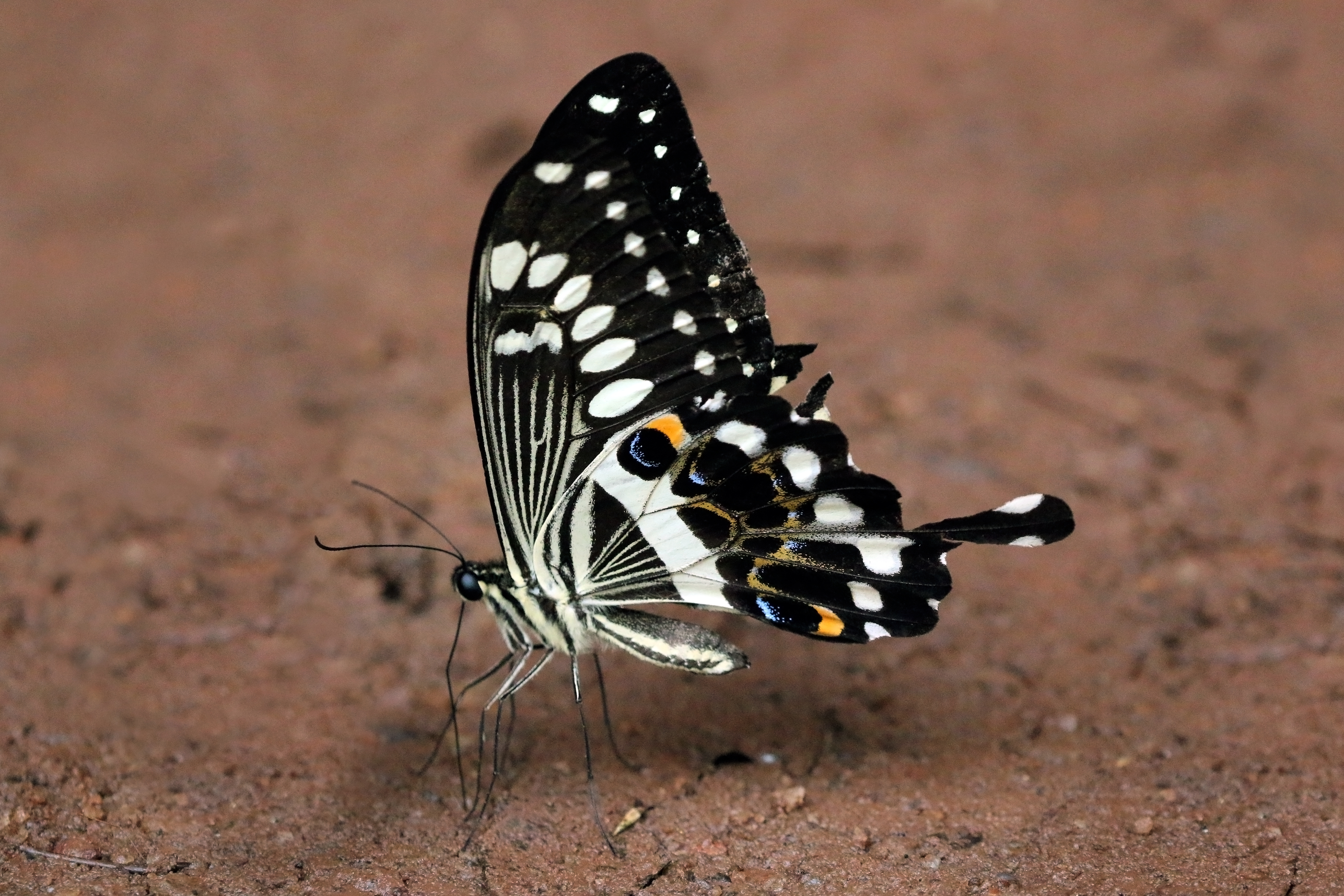
Western emperor swallowtail (Papilio menestheus), Ghana

- Papilio lormieri Distant, 1874 – central emperor swallowtail
- Papilio menestheus Drury, 1773 – western emperor swallowtail
- Papilio ophidicephalus Oberthür, 1878 – emperor swallowtail

species group: incertae sedis

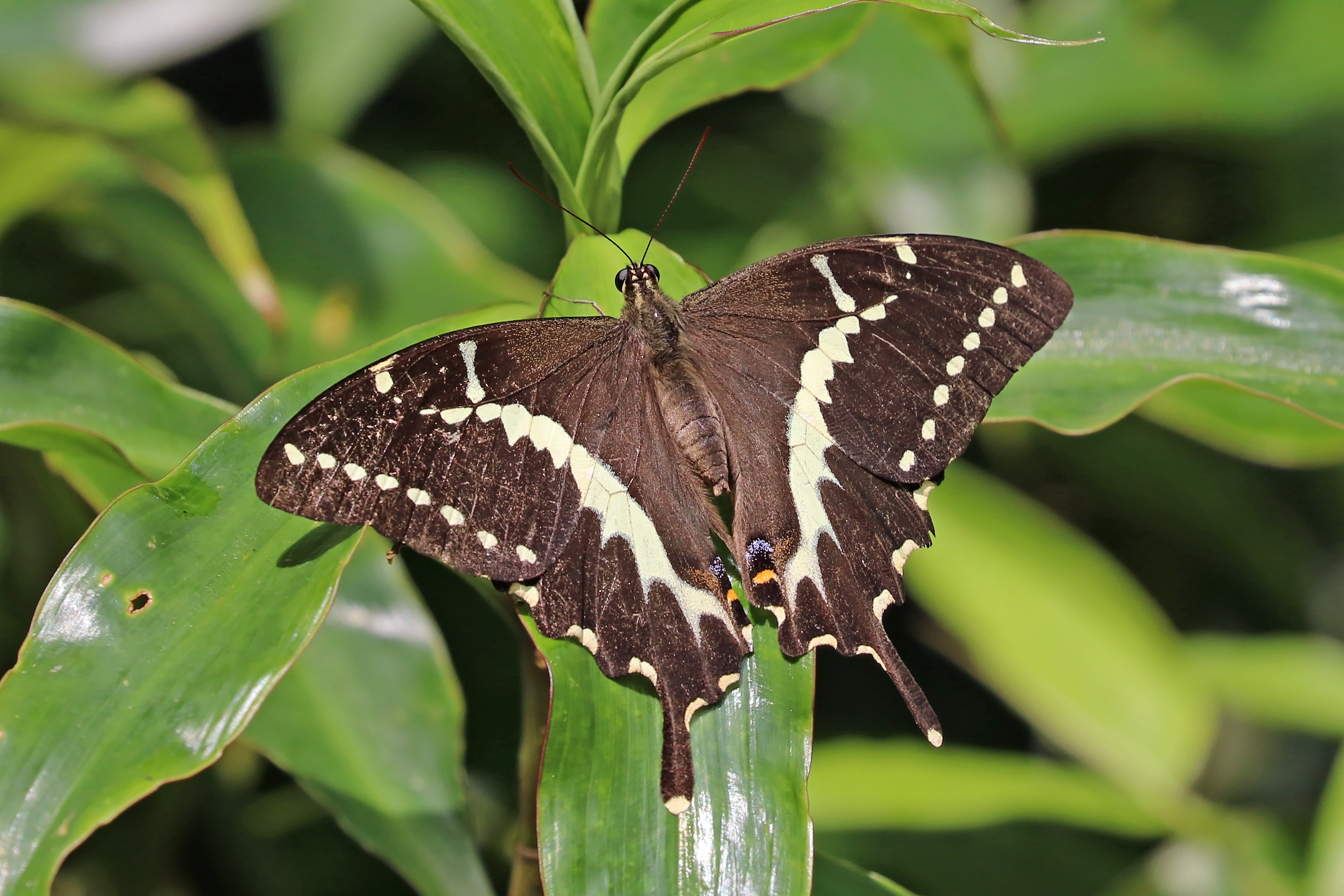
Papilio mangoura, Madagascar

- Papilio andronicus Ward, 1871
- Papilio chitondensis Bivar de Sousa & Fernandes, 1966
- Papilio leucotaenia Rothschild, 1908 – cream-banded swallowtail
- Papilio luzviae Schröder & Treadaway, 1991
- Papilio mackinnoni Sharpe, 1891 – MacKinnon's swallowtail
- Papilio mangoura Hewitson, 1875 – Mangoura swallowtail
- Papilio manlius Fabricius, 1798
- Papilio microps Storace, 1951
- Papilio nobicea Suffert, 1904
- Papilio phorbanta Linnaeus, 1771 – small Réunion swallowtail

species group: noblei

- Papilio antonio Hewitson, [1875]
- Papilio noblei de Nicéville, [1889]

species group: demolion

- Papilio demolion Cramer, [1776] – banded swallowtail
- Papilio euchenor Guérin-Méneville, 1829
- Papilio gigon C. Felder & R. Felder, 1864
- Papilio liomedon Moore, [1875] – Malabar banded swallowtail

species group: anactus

- Papilio anactus MacLeay, [1826] – dingy swallowtail
- Papilio natewa Tennent et al., [2018] – Natewa swallowtail

species group: aegeus

- Papilio aegeus Donovan, 1805 – orchard swallowtail
- Papilio bridgei Mathew, 1886
- Papilio erskinei Mathew, 1886
- Papilio gambrisius Cramer, [1777]
- Papilio inopinatus Butler, 1883
- Papilio ptolychus Godman & Salvin, 1888
- Papilio tydeus C. Felder & R. Felder, 1860
- Papilio weymeri Niepelt, 1914
- Papilio woodfordi Godman & Salvin, 1888 – Woodford's swallowtail

species group: godeffroyi

- Papilio amynthor Boisduval, 1859 – Norfolk swallowtail
- Papilio godeffroyi Semper, 1866 – Godeffroy's swallowtail
- Papilio schmeltzi Herrich-Schäffer, 1869

species group: polytes

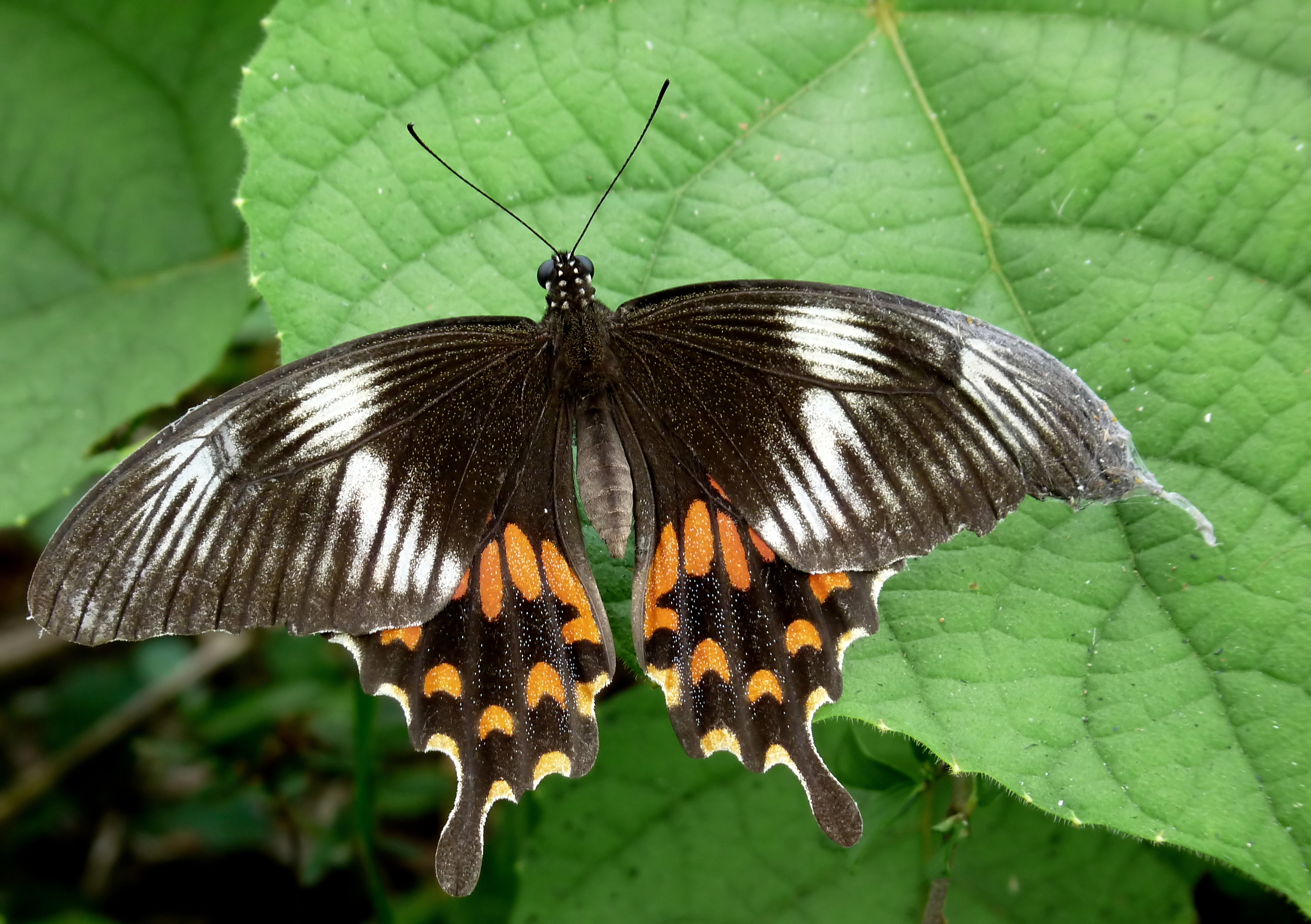
Common Mormon (Papilio polytes), India

- Papilio ambrax Boisduval, 1832 – Ambrax butterfly
- Papilio phestus Guérin-Méneville, 1830
- Papilio polytes Linnaeus, 1758 – common Mormon

species group: castor

- Papilio castor Westwood, 1842 – common raven
- Papilio dravidarum Wood-Mason, 1880 – Malabar raven
- Papilio mahadeva Moore, [1879] – Burmese raven

species group: fuscus

- Papilio albinus Wallace, 1865
- Papilio diophantus Grose-Smith, 1883
- Papilio fuscus Goeze, 1779 – Canopus butterfly
- Papilio hipponous C. Felder & R. Felder, 1862
- Papilio jordani Fruhstorfer, 1906 – Jordan's swallowtail
- Papilio pitmani Elwes & de Nicéville, [1887]
- Papilio prexaspes C. Felder & R. Felder, 1865 – Andaman Helen
- Papilio sakontala Hewitson, 1864

species group: helenus

- Papilio helenus Linnaeus, 1758 – red Helen
- Papilio iswara White, 1842 – great Helen
- Papilio iswaroides Fruhstorfer, 1898
- Papilio nephelus Boisduval, 1836 – yellow Helen
- Papilio nubilus Staudinger, 1895
- Papilio sataspes C. Felder & R. Felder, 1865

species group: memnon

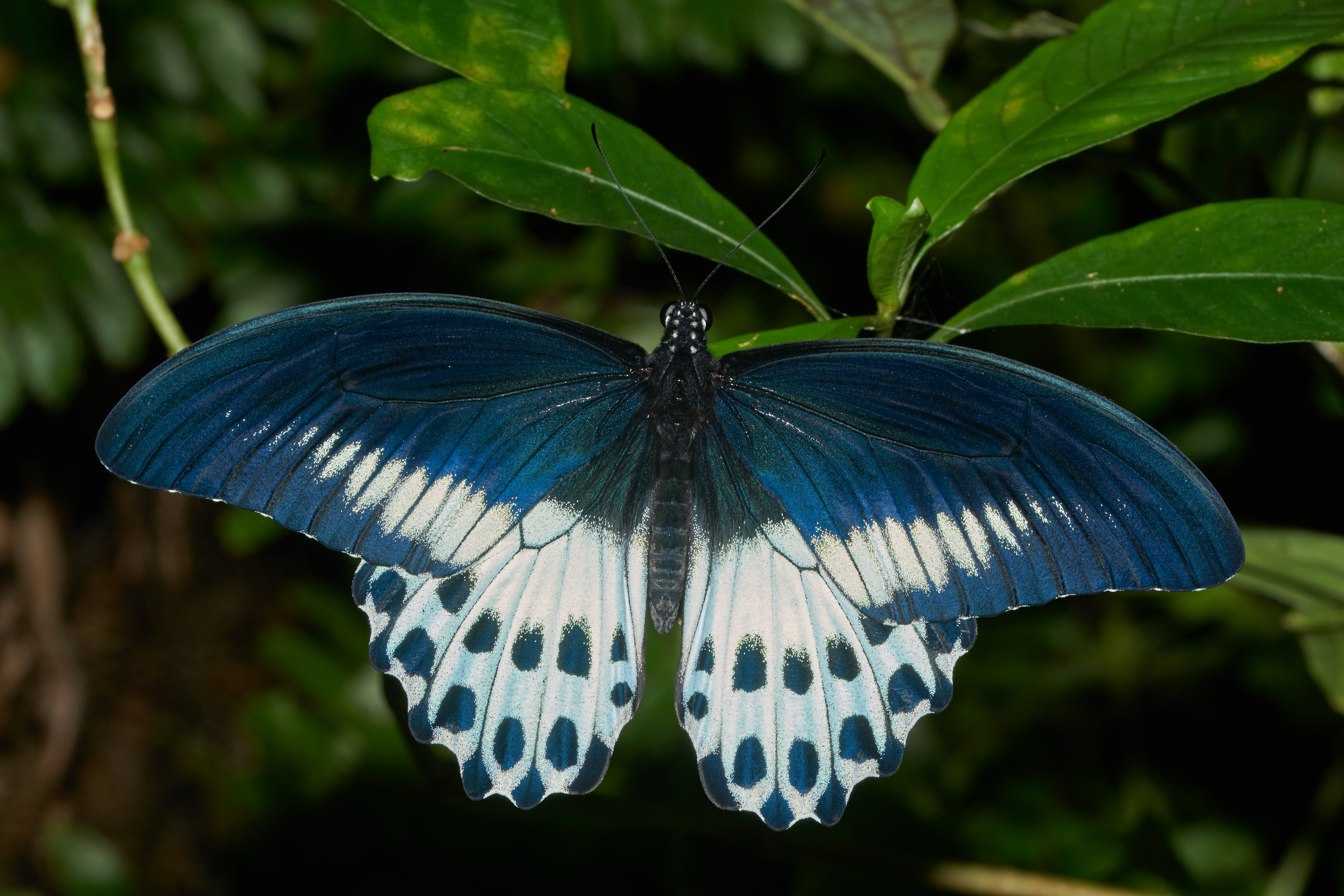
Blue Mormon Papilio polymnestor, India

- Papilio acheron Grose-Smith, 1887 – Acheron swallowtail
- Papilio ascalaphus Boisduval, 1836 – Ascalaphus swallowtail
- Papilio deiphobus Linnaeus, 1758
- Papilio forbesi Grose-Smith, 1883
- Papilio lampsacus Boisduval, 1836
- Papilio lowii H. Druce, 1873 – Asian swallowtail or great yellow Mormon
- Papilio mayo Atkinson, 1873 – Andaman Mormon
- Papilio memnon Linnaeus, 1758 – great Mormon
- Papilio oenomaus Godart, 1819
- Papilio polymnestor Cramer, [1775] – blue Mormon
- Papilio rumanzovia Eschscholtz, 1821 – scarlet Mormon or red Mormon

species group: protenor

- Papilio alcmenor C. Felder & R. Felder, [1864] – redbreast
- Papilio macilentus Janson, 1877
- Papilio protenor – spangle
- Papilio taiwanus Rothschild, 1898 – Formosan swallowtail

species group: bootes

- Papilio bootes Westwood, 1842 – tailed redbreast
- Papilio elwesi Leech, 1889
- Papilio maraho Shiraki & Sonan, 1934

subgenus: Chilasa Moore, [1881]

species group: agestor

- Papilio agestor Gray, 1831 – tawny mime
- Papilio epycides Hewitson, [1864] – lesser mime
- Papilio slateri Hewitson, 1853 – blue-striped mime

species group: clytia

- Papilio clytia Linnaeus, 1758 – common mime
- Papilio paradoxa (Zincken, 1831) – great mime

species group: veiovis

- Papilio veiovis Hewitson, [1865]

species group: laglaizei

- Papilio laglaizei Depuiset, 1877
- Papilio moerneri Aurivillius, 1919
- Papilio toboroi Ribbe, 1907

species group: unnamed

- Papilio carolinensis Jumalon, 1967
- Papilio osmana Jumalon, 1967

subgenus: Achillides Hübner, [1819]

species group: paris

- Papilio arcturus Westwood, 1842 – blue peacock
- Papilio bianor Cramer, [1777] – Chinese peacock
- Papilio blumei Boisduval, 1836 – green peacock
- Papilio chikae Igarashi, 1965 – Luzon peacock swallowtail
- Papilio dialis Leech, 1893 – southern Chinese peacock
- Papilio doddsi Janet, 1896
- Papilio elephenor Doubleday, 1845 – yellow-crested spangle
- Papilio hoppo Matsumura, 1908
- Papilio karna C. Felder & R. Felder, 1864
- Papilio krishna Moore, 1857 – Krishna peacock
- Papilio longimacula Z.G. Wang & Y. Niu, 2002
- Papilio maackii Ménétriés, 1859 – alpine black swallowtail
- Papilio paris Linnaeus, 1758 – Paris peacock
- Papilio polyctor Boisduval, 1836 – common peacock

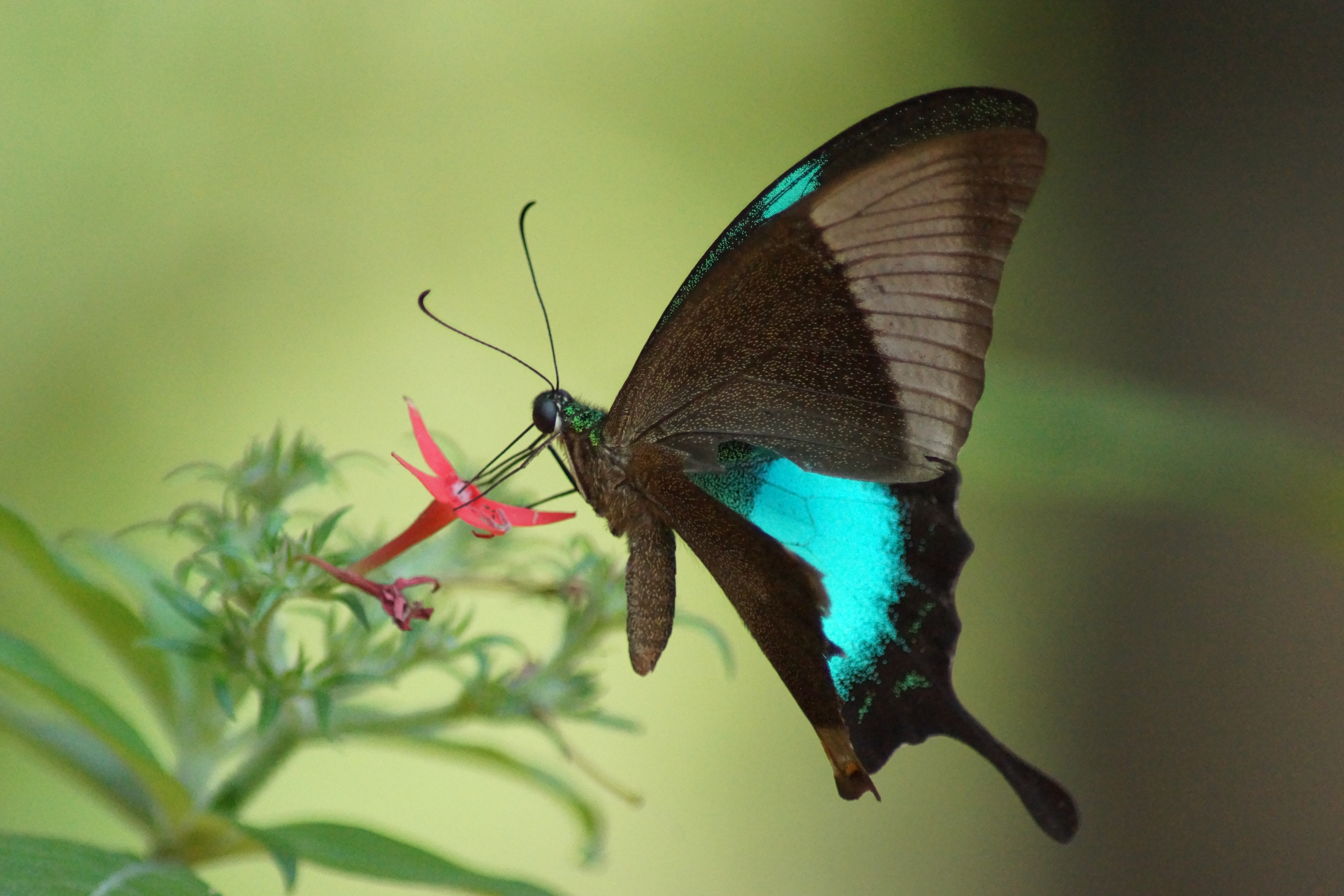
Malabar banded peacock (Papilio buddha)

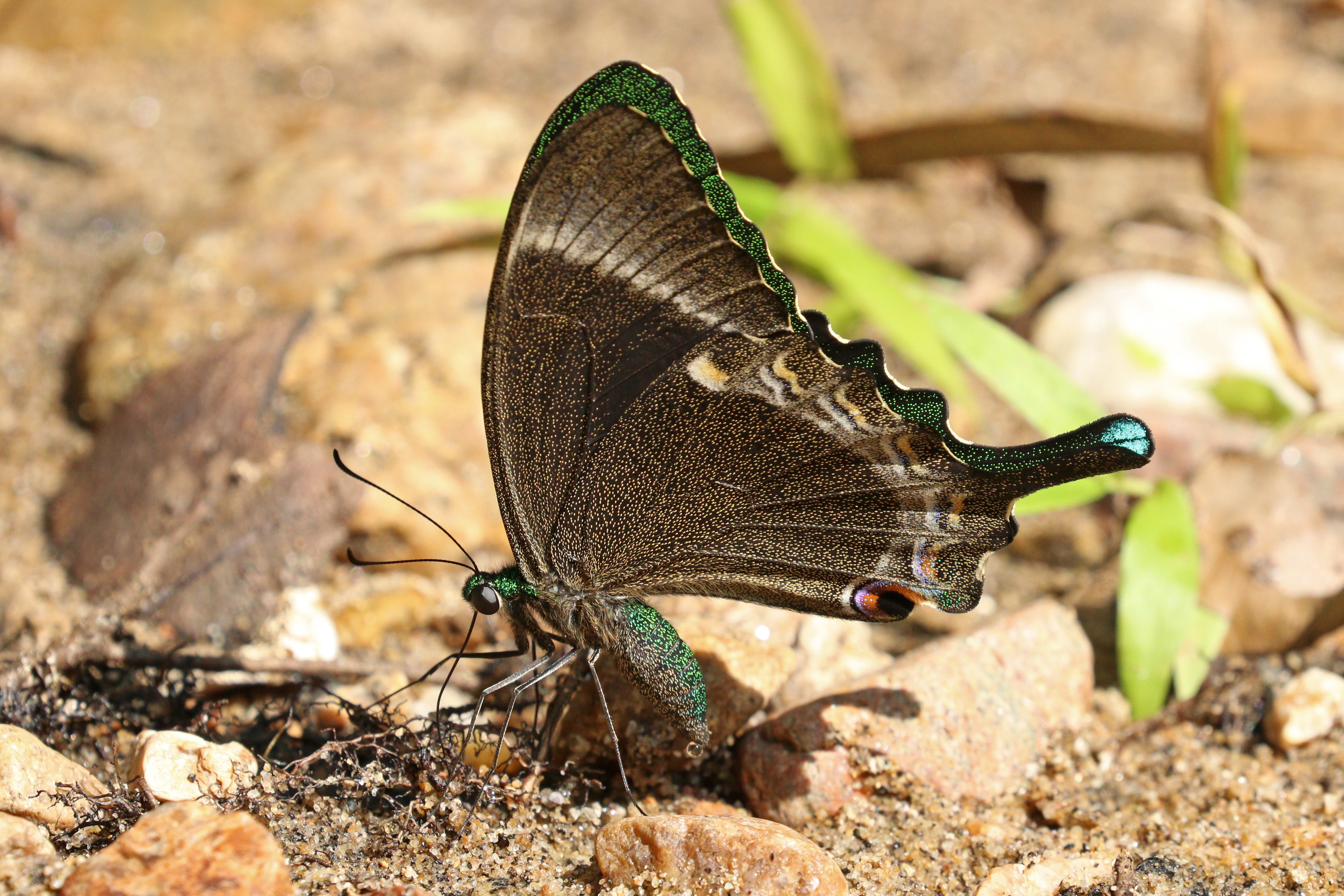
Common banded peacock (Papilio crino), India

species group: palinurus

- Papilio blumei Boisduval, 1836 – peacock or green swallowtail
- Papilio buddha Westwood, 1872 – Malabar banded peacock
- Papilio crino Fabricius, 1793 – common banded peacock
- Papilio palinurus Fabricius, 1787 – emerald swallowtail

species group: unnamed

- Papilio lorquinianus C. Felder & R. Felder, 1865
- Papilio neumoegeni Honrath, 1890
- Papilio peranthus Fabricius, 1787
- Papilio pericles Wallace, 1865

species group: ulysses

- Papilio montrouzieri Boisduval, 1859
- Papilio syfanius Oberthür, 1886
- Papilio ulysses Linnaeus, 1758 – Ulysses, mountain blue, blue emperor, or blue mountain swallowtail

subgenus: Heraclides Hübner, [1819]

species group: anchisiades

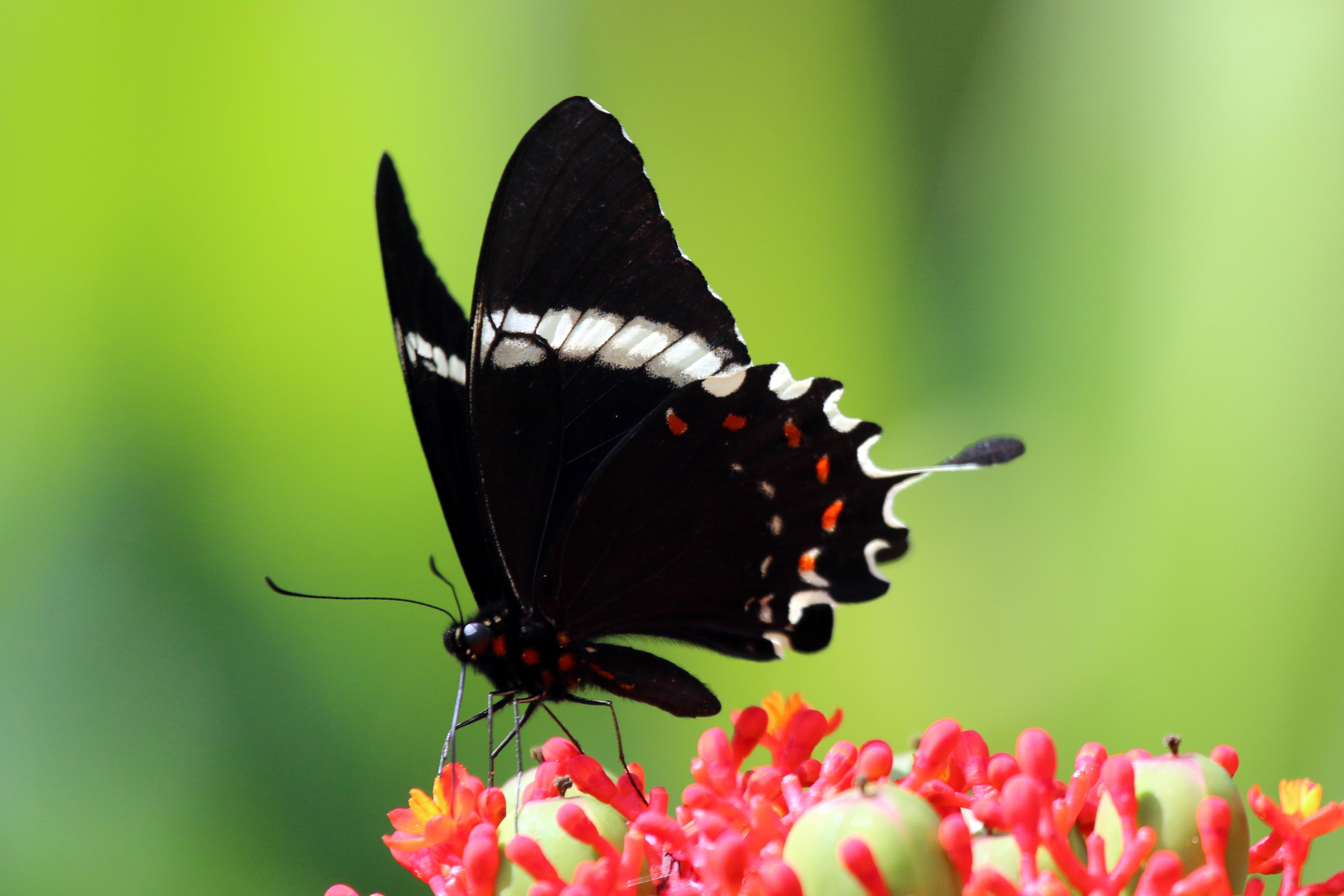
Prickly ash swallowtail (Papilio pelaus), Jamaica

- Papilio anchisiades Esper, 1788 – ruby-spotted swallowtail or red-spotted swallowtail
- Papilio chiansiades Westwood, 1872
- Papilio epenetus Hewitson, 1861
- Papilio erostratus Westwood, 1847 – Erostratus swallowtail
- Papilio hyppason Cramer, 1775
- Papilio isidorus Doubleday, 1846
- Papilio oxynius (Geyer, [1827])
- Papilio pelaus Fabricius, 1775
- Papilio rogeri Boisduval, 1836

species group: thoas

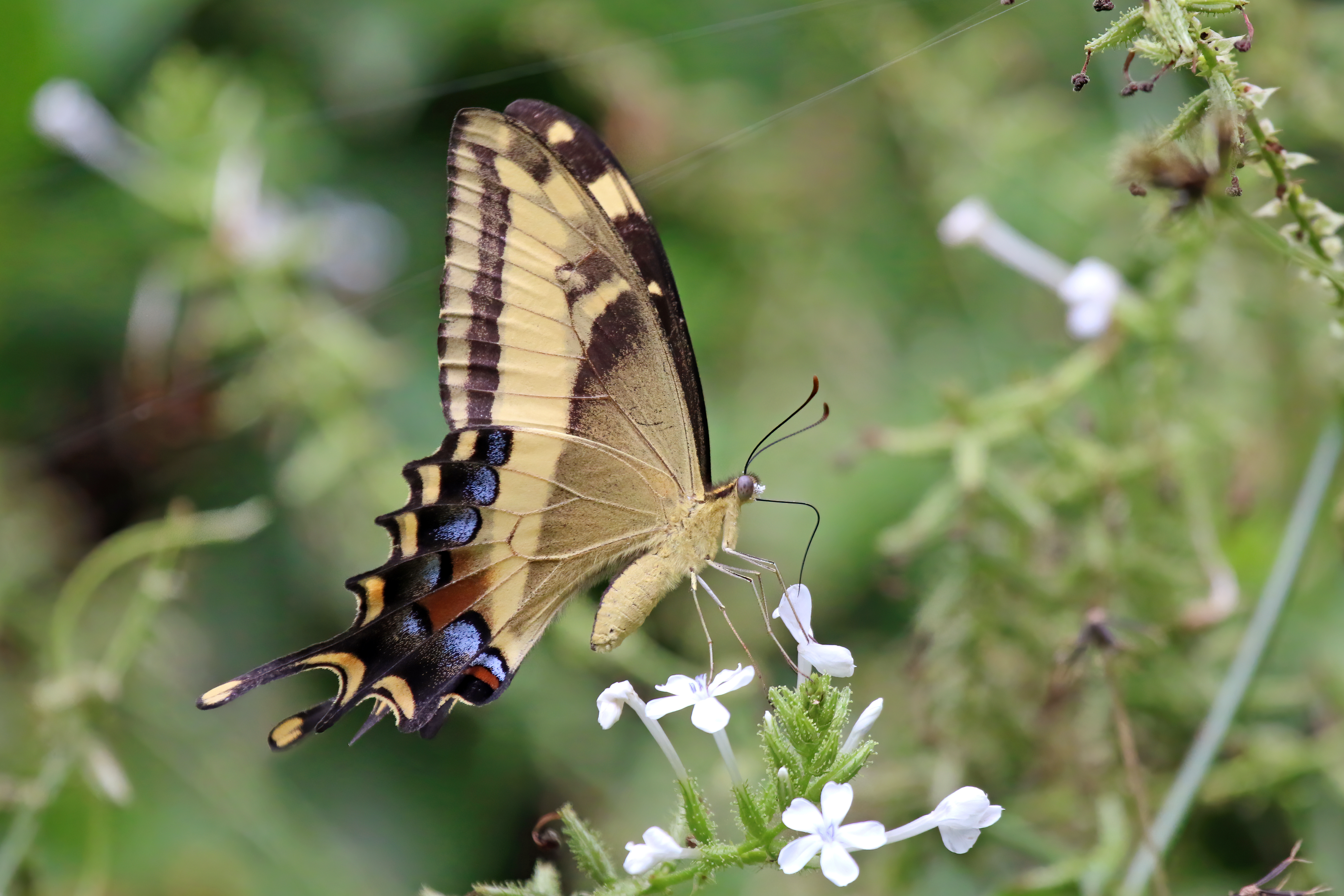
Bahamian swallowtail (Papilio andraemon), Jamaica

- Papilio andraemon (Hübner, [1823]) – Bahaman swallowtail
- Papilio androgeus Cramer, [1775] – Androgeus swallowtail, queen page, or queen swallowtail
- Papilio aristodemus Esper, 1794 – Schaus' swallowtail or island swallowtail
- Papilio aristor Godart, 1819 – scarce Haitian swallowtail
- Papilio astyalus Godart, 1819 – broad-banded swallowtail or Astyalus swallowtail
- Papilio caiguanabus Poey, [1852] – Poey's black swallowtail
- Papilio cresphontes Cramer, [1777] – eastern giant swallowtail
- Papilio homothoas Rothschild & Jordan, 1906
- Papilio machaonides Esper, 1796
- Papilio melonius Rothschild & Jordan, 1906
- Papilio ornythion Boisduval, 1836 – Ornythion swallowtail
- Papilio paeon Boisduval, 1836
- Papilio rumiko (Shiraiwa & Grishin, 2014)
- Papilio thersites Fabricius, 1775 – Thersites swallowtail or false Androgeus swallowtail
- Papilio thoas Linnaeus, 1771 – Thoas swallowtail or king swallowtail

species group: torquatus

- Papilio garleppi Staudinger, 1892 – Garlepp's swallowtail
- Papilio hectorides Esper, 1794
- Papilio himeros Hopffer, 1865 – Himeros swallowtail
- Papilio lamarchei Staudinger, 1892
- Papilio torquatus Cramer, 1777 – Torquatus swallowtail

species group: unnamed

- Papilio okinawensis Fruhstorfer, 1898

subgenus: Pterourus Scopoli, 1777

species group: troilus

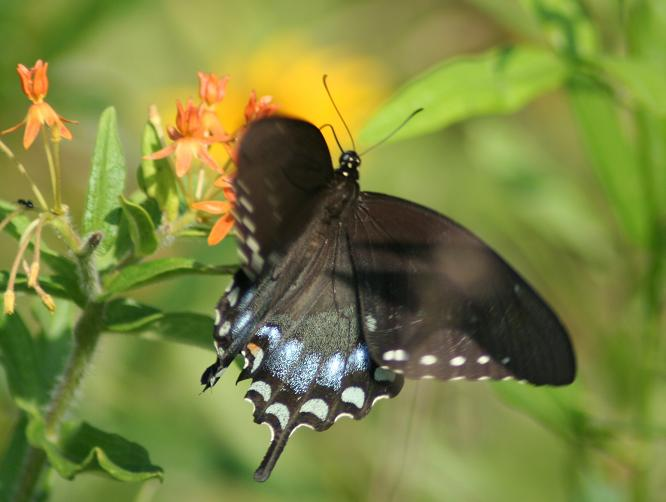
Spicebush swallowtail (Papilio troilus)

- Papilio palamedes Drury, [1773] – Palamedes swallowtail or laurel swallowtail
- Papilio troilus Linnaeus, 1758 – spicebush swallowtail

species group: glaucus

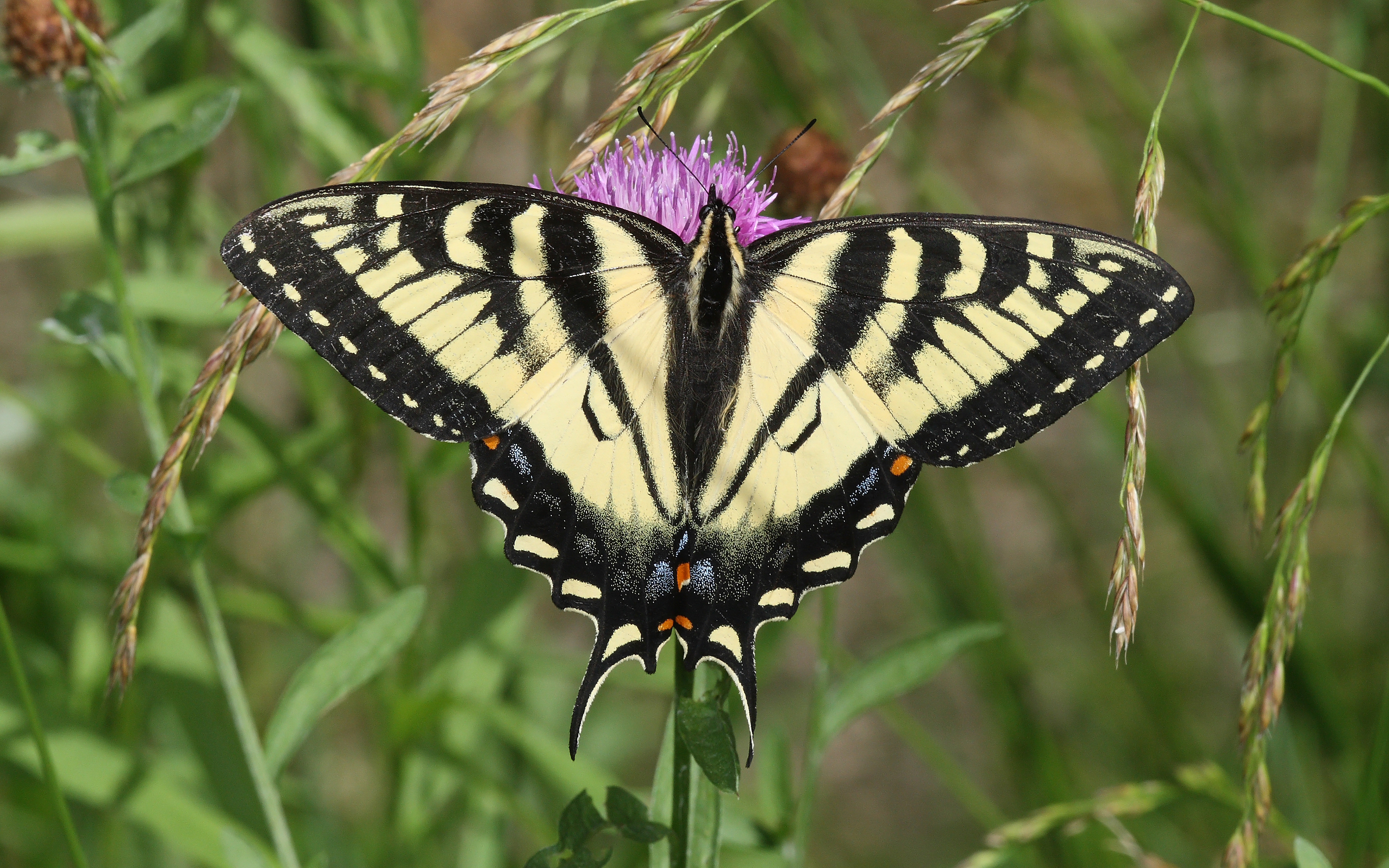
Canadian tiger swallowtail (Papilio canadensis), Canada

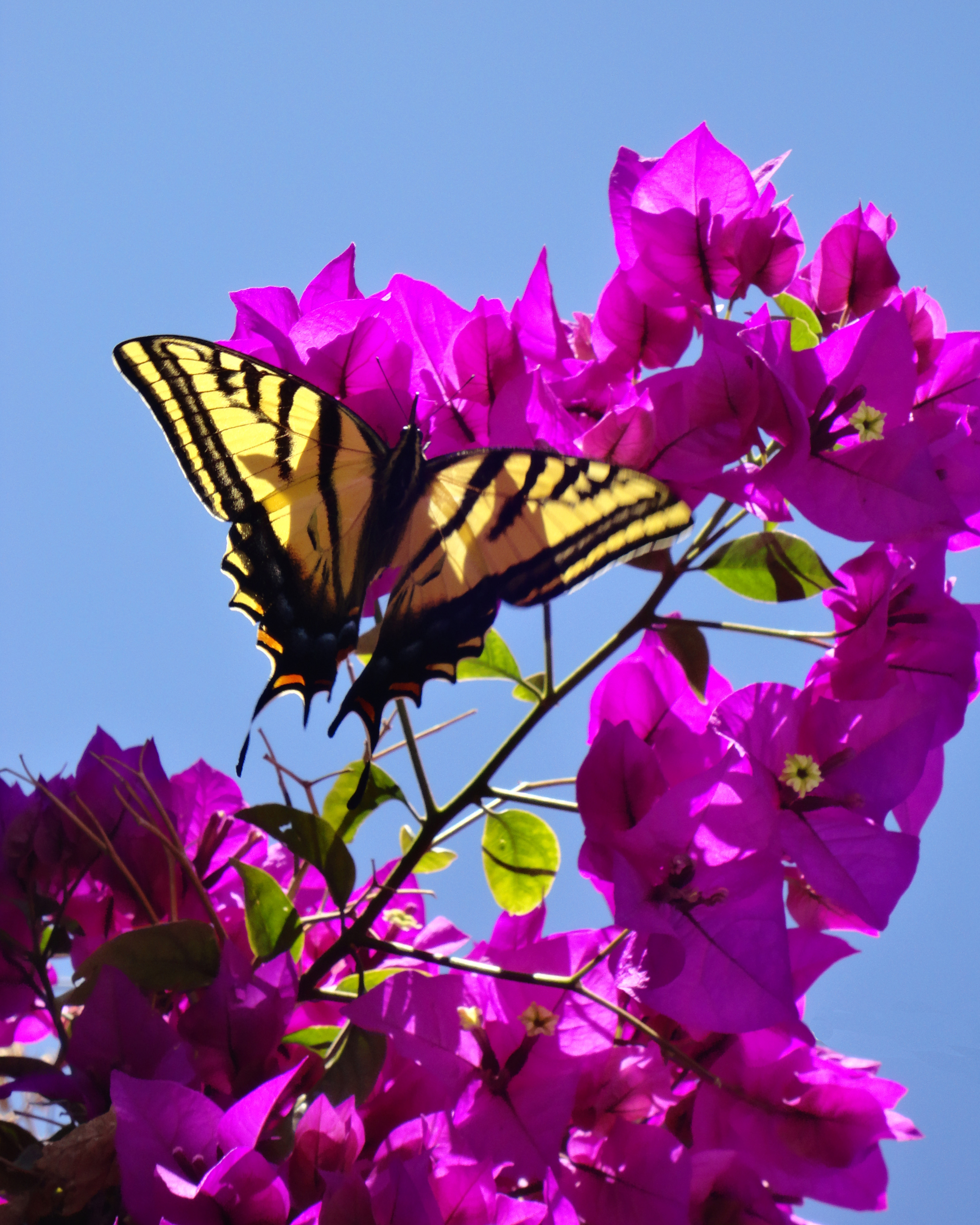
Two-tailed swallowtail (Papilio multicaudata), Mexico

- Papilio alexiares Höpffer, 1866 – Mexican tiger swallowtail
- Papilio appalachiensis (Pavulaan & Wright, 2002) – Appalachian tiger swallowtail
- Papilio bjorkae Pavulaan, 2024 – New England tiger swallowtail
- Papilio canadensis Rothschild & Jordan, 1906 – Canadian tiger swallowtail
- Papilio esperanza Beutelspacher, 1975 – Esperanza swallowtail
- Papilio eurymedon Lucas, 1852 – pale swallowtail or pallid tiger swallowtail
- Papilio glaucus Linnaeus, 1758 – eastern tiger swallowtail
- Papilio multicaudata Kirby, 1884 – two-tailed swallowtail
- Papilio pilumnus Boisduval, 1836 – three-tailed tiger swallowtail
- Papilio rutulus Lucas, 1852 – western tiger swallowtail
- Papilio solstitius DeRoller, Wang, Dupuis & Schmidt, 2025 – midsummer tiger swallowtail

species group: zagreus

- Papilio bachus C. Felder & R. Felder, 1865
- Papilio neyi Niepelt, 1909
- Papilio zagreus Doubleday, 1847

species group: scamander

- Papilio birchallii Hewitson, 1863
- Papilio hellanichus Hewitson, 1868
- Papilio scamander Boisduval, 1836
- Papilio xanthopleura Godman & Salvin, 1868

species group: homerus

- Papilio cacicus Lucas, 1852
- Papilio euterpinus Salvin & Godman, 1868
- Papilio garamas (Geyer, [1829])
- Papilio homerus Fabricius, 1793 – Homerus swallowtail
- Papilio judicael Oberthür, 1888 (tentatively placed here, may be hybrid)
- Papilio menatius (Hübner, [1819])
- Papilio warscewiczii Hopffer, 1865

subgenus: Sinoprinceps Hancock, 1983

- Papilio benguetanus Joicey & Talbot, 1923

species group: xuthus Hancock, 1983

- Papilio xuthus Linnaeus, 1767 – Asian, Xuthus, or Chinese yellow swallowtail

=== Former species ===
Many species originally described in the genus Papilio have now been reclassified. For a list of selected former species see List of former species in the genus Papilio.
