= Papilio xanthopleura =

Scientific classification
- Kingdom: Animalia
- Phylum: Arthropoda
- Clade: Pancrustacea
- Class: Insecta
- Order: Lepidoptera
- Family: Papilionidae
- Genus: Papilio
- Species: P. xanthopleura

Binomial name
- Papilio xanthopleura Godman & Salvin, 1868

Synonyms
- Papilio xanthopleura var. diaphora Staudinger, 1891

Species of butterfly

Papilio xanthopleura is a species of swallowtail butterfly from the genus Papilio that is found in Peru and Brazil.

== Description ==
Sides of the abdomen yellow; under surface of the hindwing, without discal band, the red submarginal spots large. The female in two forms: female -f. xanthopleura is similar to the male, while female-f. diaphora Stgr. has a large pale yellow area on the upperside of the forewing.
