= Papilio andronicus =

Scientific classification
- Kingdom: Animalia
- Phylum: Arthropoda
- Clade: Pancrustacea
- Class: Insecta
- Order: Lepidoptera
- Family: Papilionidae
- Genus: Papilio
- Species: P. andronicus

Binomial name
- Papilio andronicus Ward, 1871

Synonyms
- Papilio chionicus Karsch, 1893

Species of butterfly

Papilio andronicus is a species of swallowtail butterfly from the genus Papilio that is found in Cameroon.

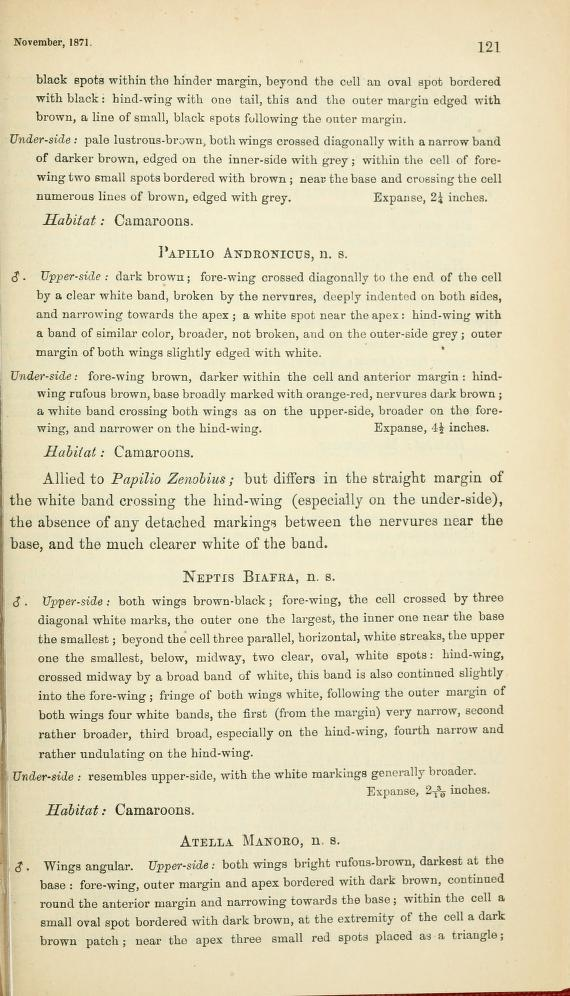
Original description
