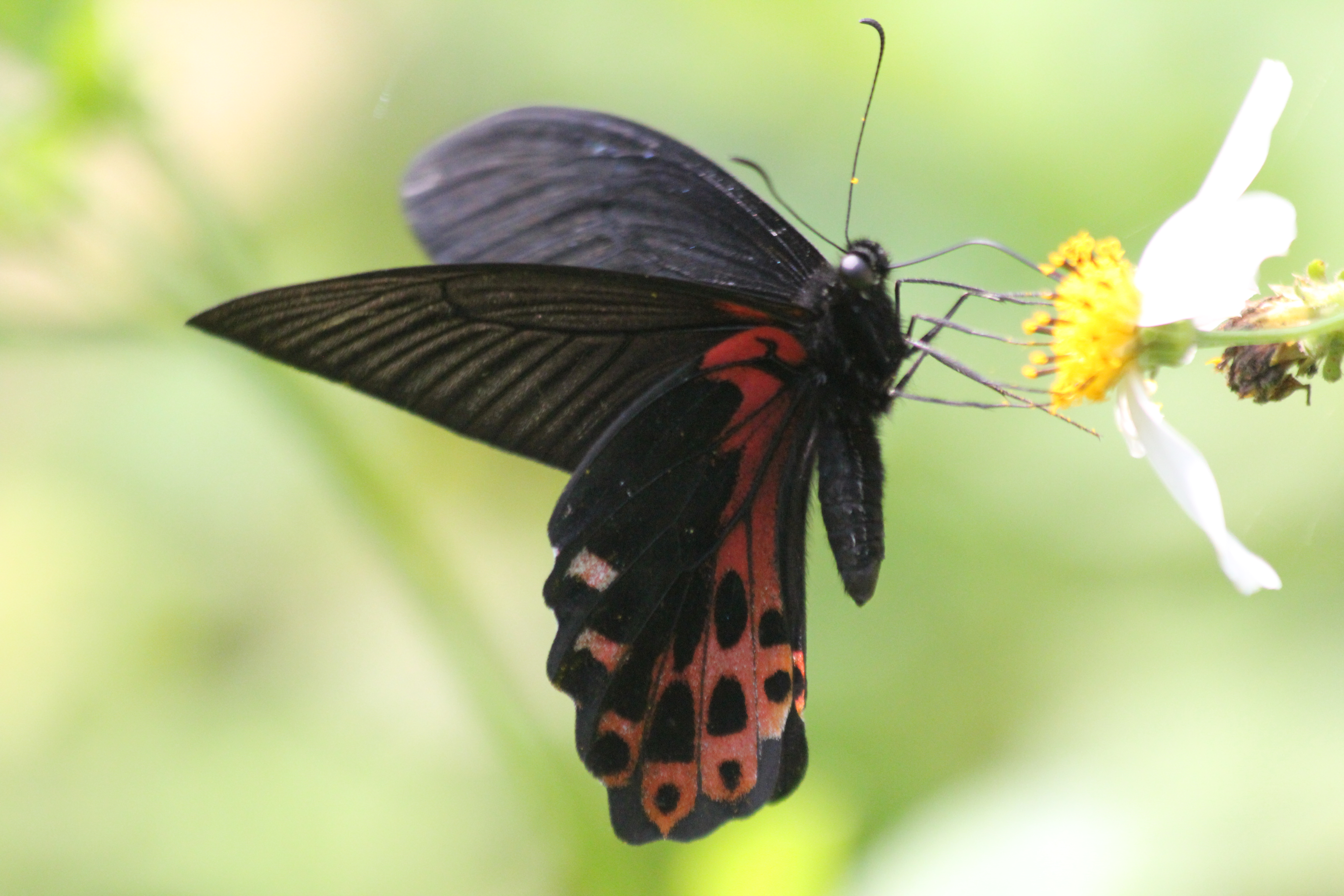

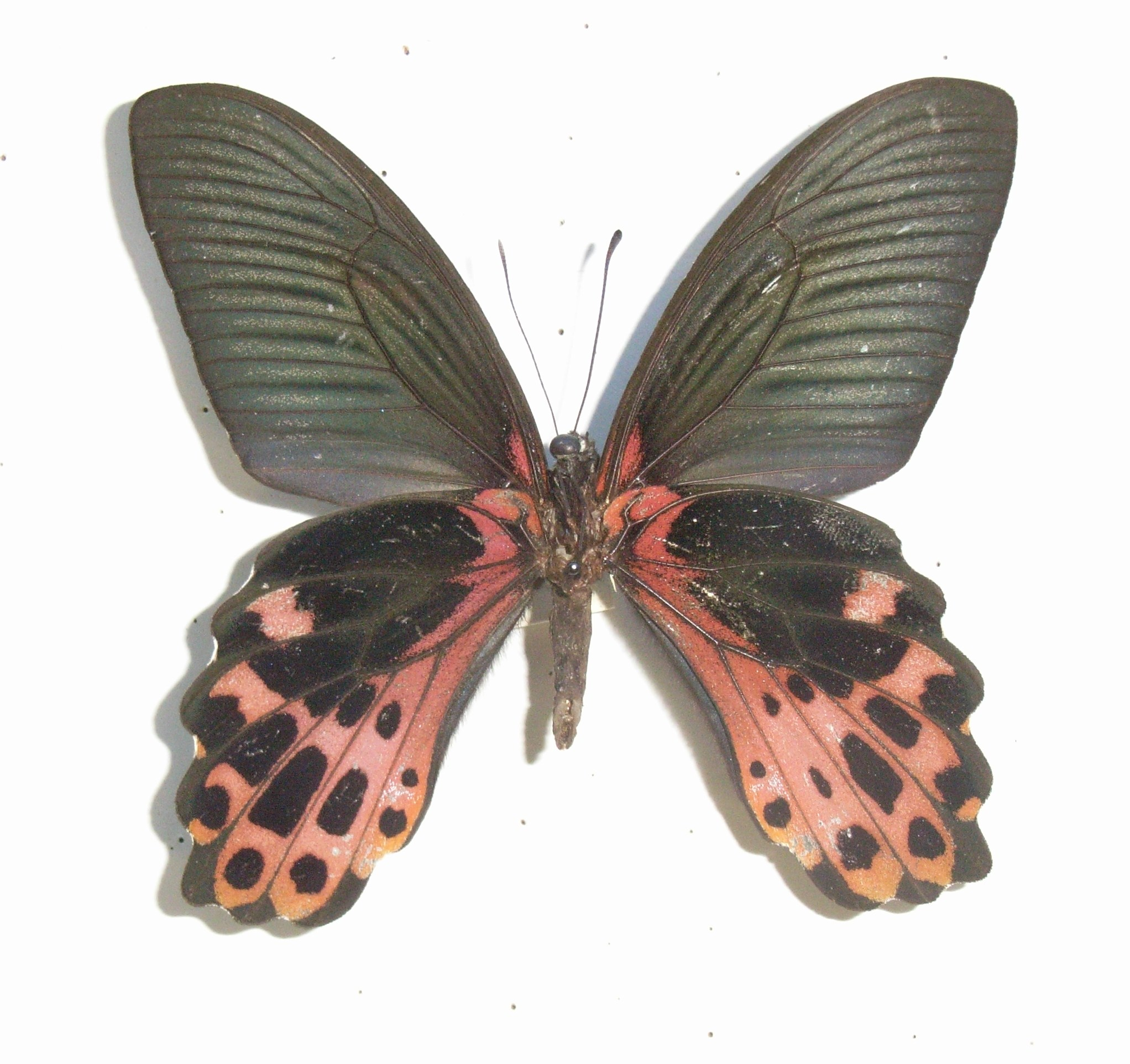
- Pinned specimen

Scientific classification
- Kingdom: Animalia
- Phylum: Arthropoda
- Clade: Pancrustacea
- Class: Insecta
- Order: Lepidoptera
- Family: Papilionidae
- Genus: Papilio
- Species: P. thaiwanus

Binomial name
- Papilio thaiwanus Rothschild, 1898

= Papilio thaiwanus =

Formosan swallowtail

Species of butterfly

Papilio thaiwanus, the Formosan swallowtail, is a butterfly in the swallowtail family. It is endemic to Taiwan.

P. thaiwanus Bothsch. (= annaeus Fruhst.) (32 d female), which by a lapsus was described as a form of protenor, is much more strikingly different in the female than in the male. Male under surface of the forewing almost entirely black,the grey stripes being reduced as in many butterflies from Formosa; the red area on the underside of the hindwing is much more extended than in the other forms and there are large red submarginal spots as far as the subcostal. The female tailless; forewing paler than in P. rhetenor; hindwing from the subcostal to the analmargin with a macular band, the anterior patches of which are large and white and the posterior ones smaller and reddish, the posterior submarginal spots united into rings with the marginal spots; under surface as in the male with larger markings than in P. rhetenor. — Formosa.

The larva feeds on Toddalia asiatica, Zanthoxylum ailanthoides, and Cinnamomum camphora.
