= Papilio luzviae =

Scientific classification
- Kingdom: Animalia
- Phylum: Arthropoda
- Clade: Pancrustacea
- Class: Insecta
- Order: Lepidoptera
- Family: Papilionidae
- Genus: Papilio
- Species: P. luzviae

Binomial name
- Papilio luzviae Schröder & Treadaway, 1991

Species of butterfly

Papilio luzviae is a species of swallowtail butterfly from the genus Papilio that is found on Marinduque in the Philippines.
