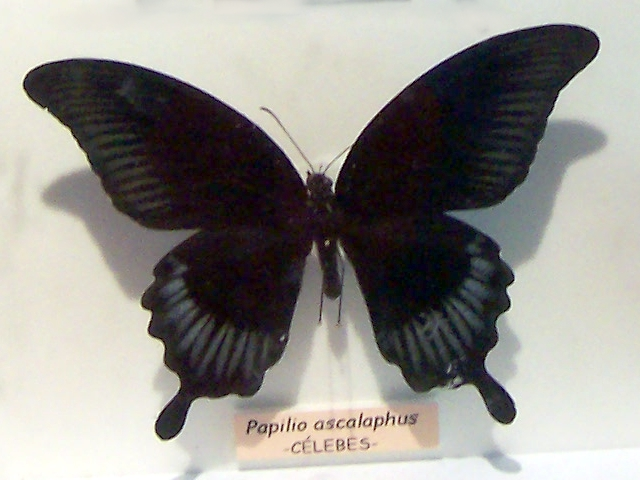
- Male
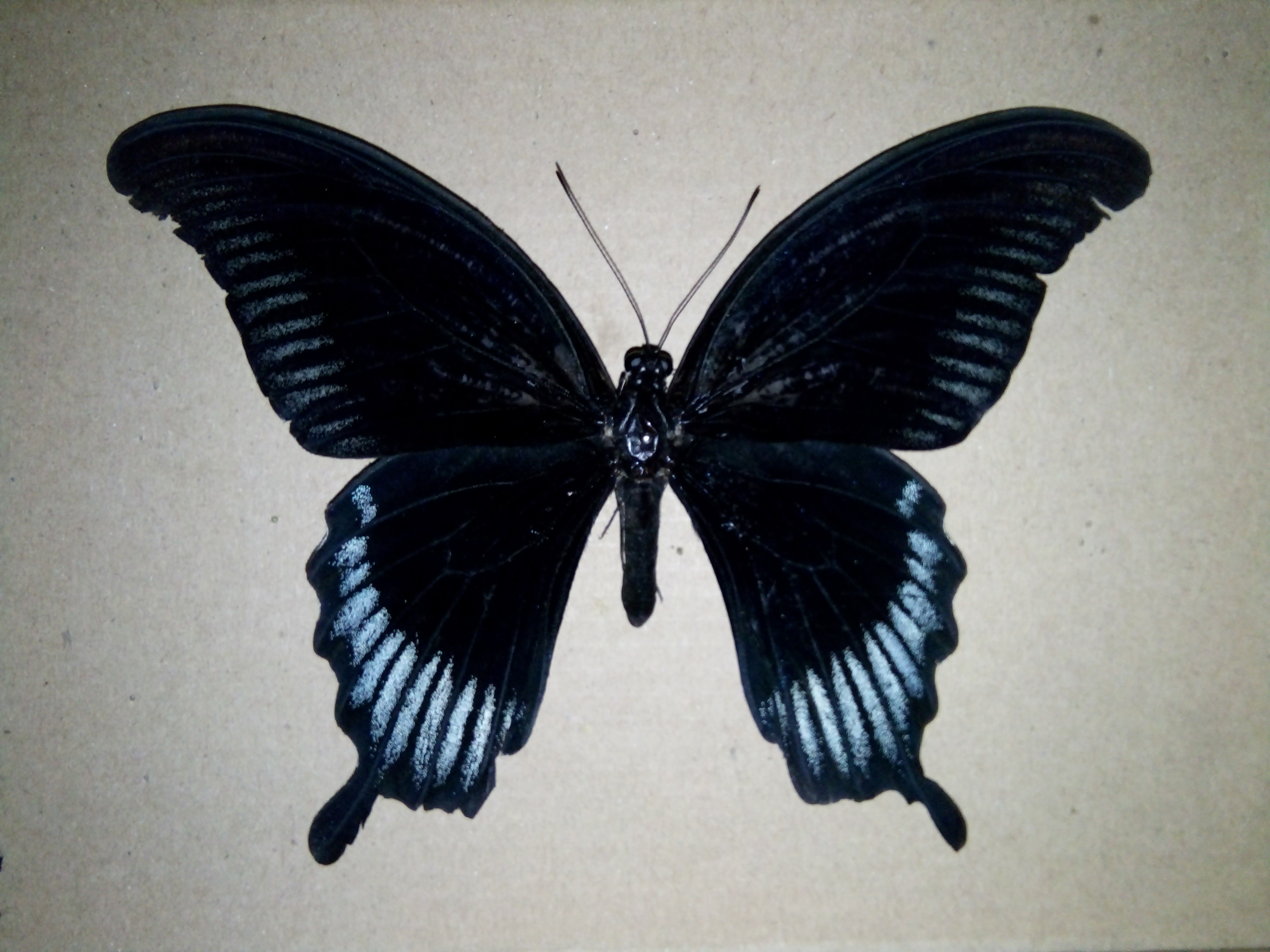
- P. a. ascalaphus, North Gorontalo

Scientific classification
- Kingdom: Animalia
- Phylum: Arthropoda
- Clade: Pancrustacea
- Class: Insecta
- Order: Lepidoptera
- Family: Papilionidae
- Genus: Papilio
- Species: P. ascalaphus

Binomial name
- Papilio ascalaphus Boisduval, 1836

Synonyms
- Menelaides ascalaphus; Papilio ascalaphus nubiger Fruhstorfer, 1899.

= Papilio ascalaphus =

Ascalaphus swallowtail

Species of butterfly

Papilio ascalaphus, the black phoenix or Ascalaphus swallowtail, is a butterfly of the family Papilionidae. It is found in Indonesia and the Philippines.

The wingspan is 140–160 mm. P. ascalaphus. Underside of the body almost without traces of grey-white longitudinal lines; palpi with white spot, both sexes tailed and above and beneath without patches at the base. : forewing with yellowish grey, hindwing with grey-blue or yellowish grey stripes before the distal margin; beneath the stripes of the forewing more discally placed, those of the hindwing replaced by much shorter grey-blue discal spots, distally to which are placed yellow submarginal spots, more or less shaded with blue. The female very different from the male the forewing from the base to about the 2. median black, then follows a large, posteriorly narrowed central white area, which is intersected by black stripes, the distal margin again broadly black; hind¬ wing with large white central area, interrupted by the veins, which in a second female-form is only indicated by indistinctly defined grey and bluish patches; the red-yellow submarginal spots, with white tips, are well developed above and beneath. The earlier stages not described. The yellow egg is laid on Citrus, on which the larva lives. The butterfly is very common, especially in lower elevations near the coast. It is frequently found at Papaja flowers. The females are also fond of hiding in the foliage of Citrus trees and fly about even in the gardens and streets of Macassar (Fruhstorfer). — ascalaphus Bdv. (88 a), from Celebes.Male on the upper surface of the hindwing with broad grey-blue band composed of stripes. The female bears normally a large white discal area on the hindwing; but sometimes specimens also occur in which this area is replaced by indistinct, blue-dusted grey patches: female-ab. nubiger Fruhst.; this darkened form is only known to me [Jordan] from North Celebes. — ascalon Stgr. (28 a). the stripes on the upperside of both wings short and yellowish, on the hindwing much less prominent than in ascalaphus. In the female the middle of the forewing and the discal area of the hindwing are purer white than in ascalaphus. Sulla Islands: Mangola.

The larvae feed on Citrus species.

== Subspecies ==
- Papilio ascalaphus ascalaphus (Sulawesi) - Sulawesi Blue Mormon
- Papilio ascalaphus munascalaphus (Muna Island)
- Papilio ascalaphus ascalon (Sula Island)
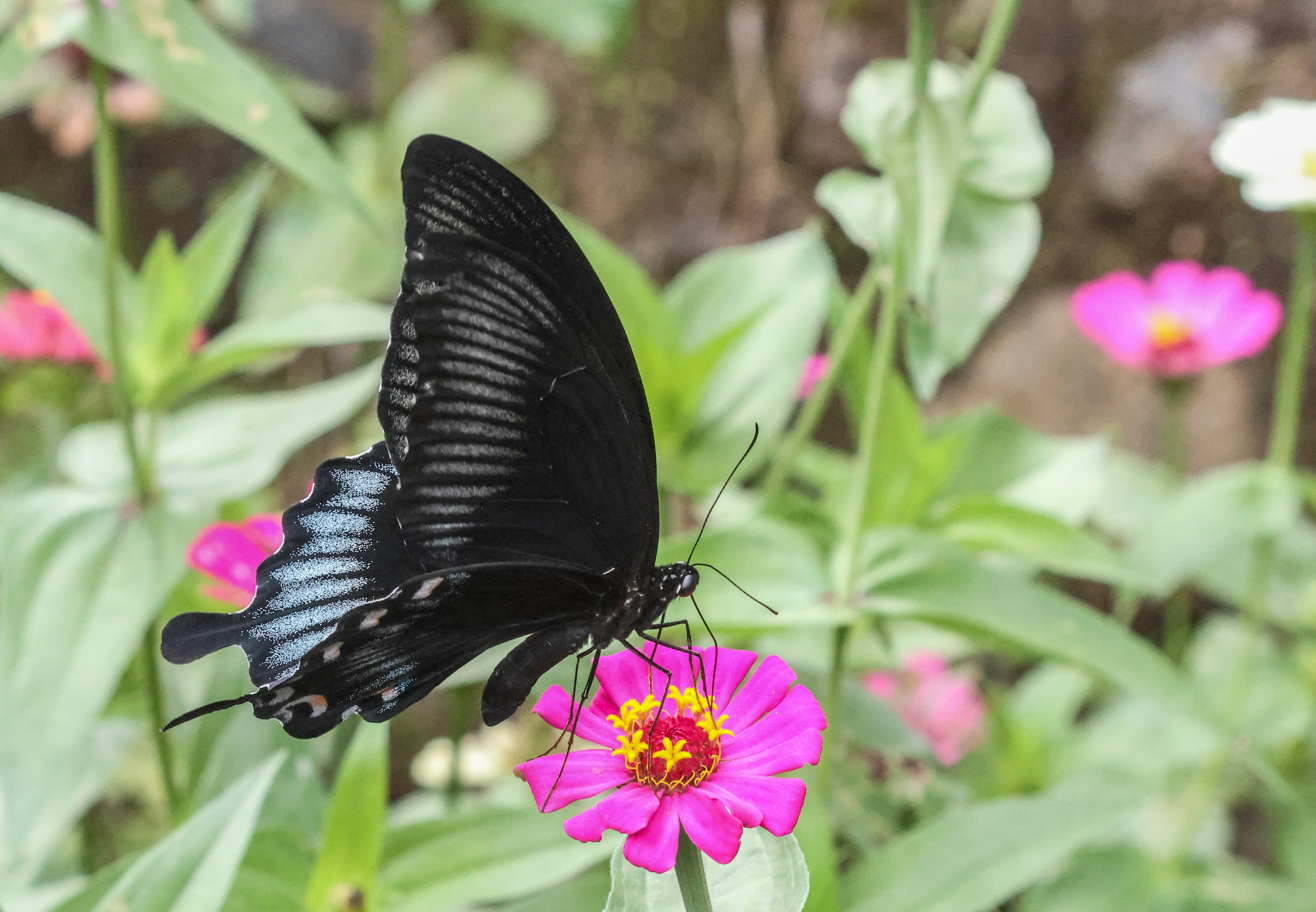
  Sulawesi Blue Mormon from Tomohon, Sulawesi
