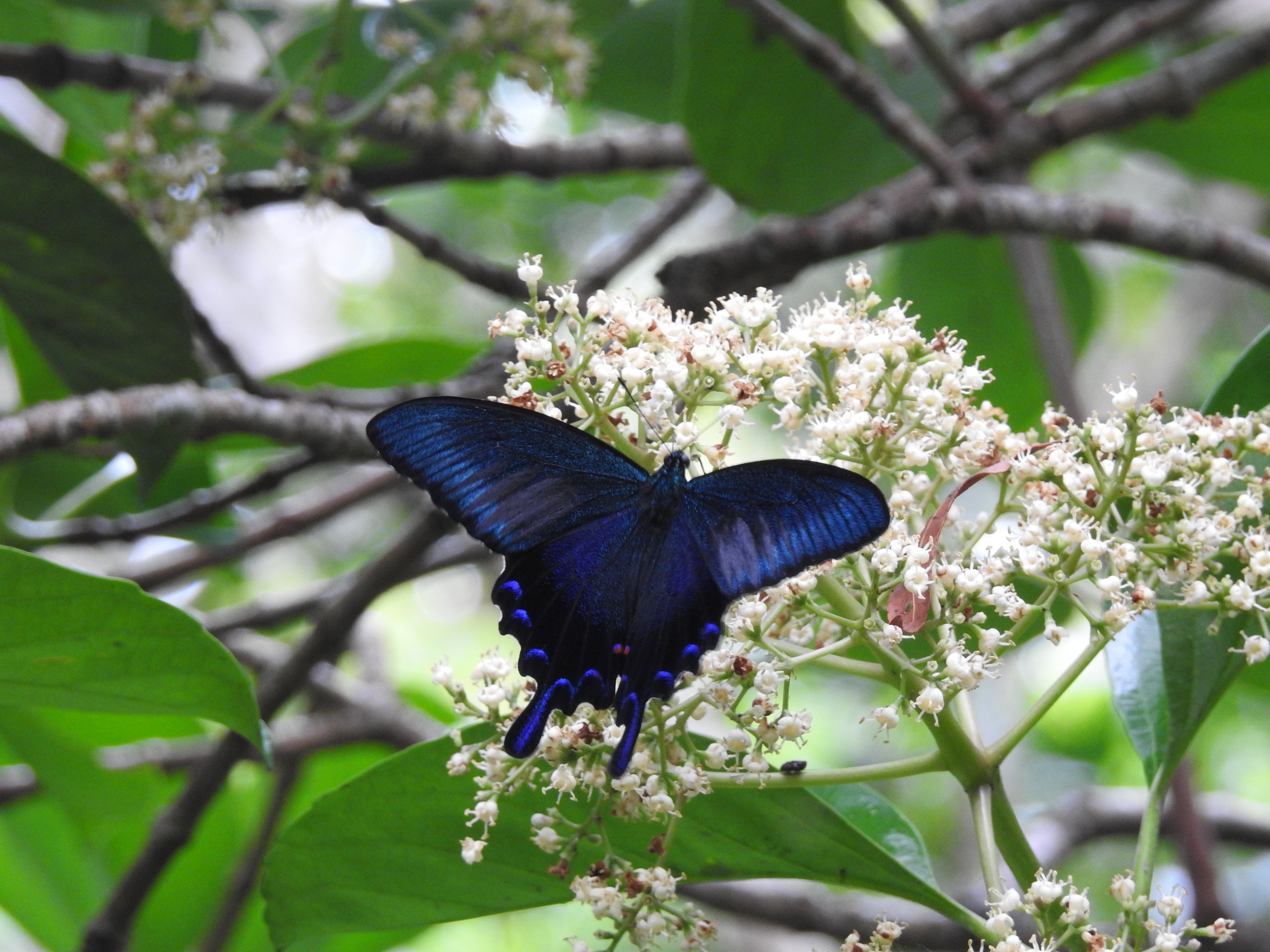

Scientific classification
- Kingdom: Animalia
- Phylum: Arthropoda
- Clade: Pancrustacea
- Class: Insecta
- Order: Lepidoptera
- Family: Papilionidae
- Genus: Papilio
- Species: P. okinawensis

Binomial name
- Papilio okinawensis Fruhstorfer, 1898

Synonyms
- Papilio bianor okinawensis Fruhstorfer, 1898; Papilio okiwanensis

= Papilio okinawensis =

Species of butterfly

Papilio okinawensis, the Okinawa peacock, is a species of swallowtail butterfly from the genus Papilio that is found in Japan.
