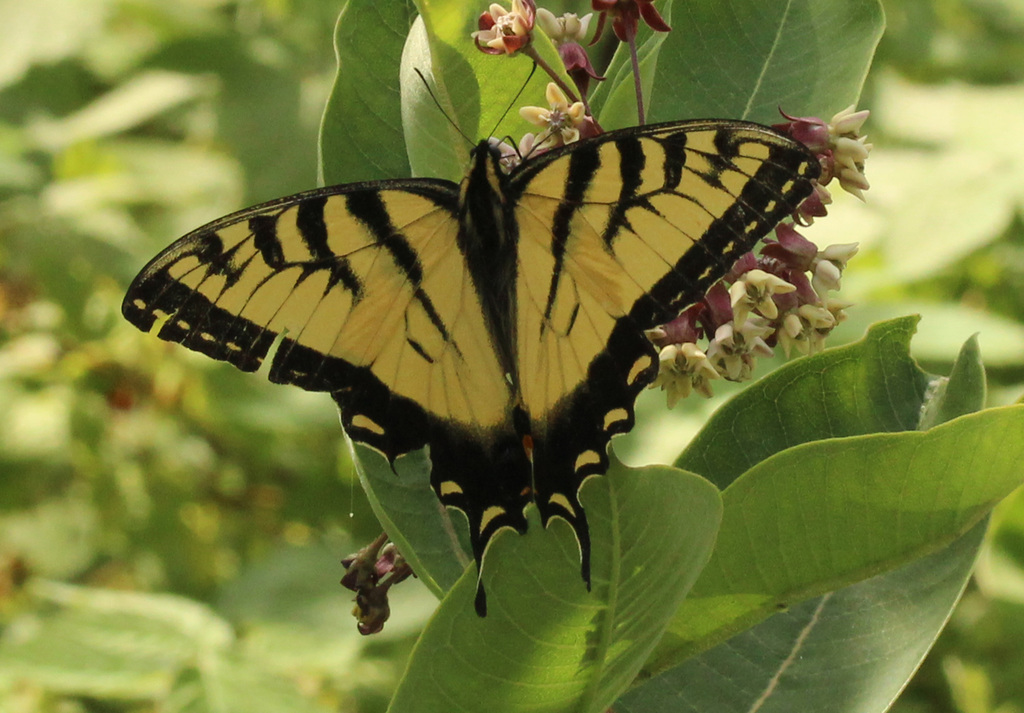

Scientific classification
- Kingdom: Animalia
- Phylum: Arthropoda
- Clade: Pancrustacea
- Class: Insecta
- Order: Lepidoptera
- Family: Papilionidae
- Genus: Papilio
- Species: P. solstitius

Binomial name
- Papilio solstitius DeRoller, Wang, Dupuis & Schmidt, 2025

= Papilio solstitius =

Species of insect

Papilio solstitius, commonly known as the midsummer tiger swallowtail, is a species of swallowtail butterfly, in the genus Papilio. It is closely related to Papilio appalachiensis, Papilio canadensis, and Papilio glaucus.

== Etymology ==
Papilio solstitius gets its name from the Latin word solstitius, which means solstice. It gets this name because of its flight pattern, being in the midsummer, near the summer solstice.

== Distribution ==
Papilio solstitius is native to the northeastern United States and southern Ontario.
