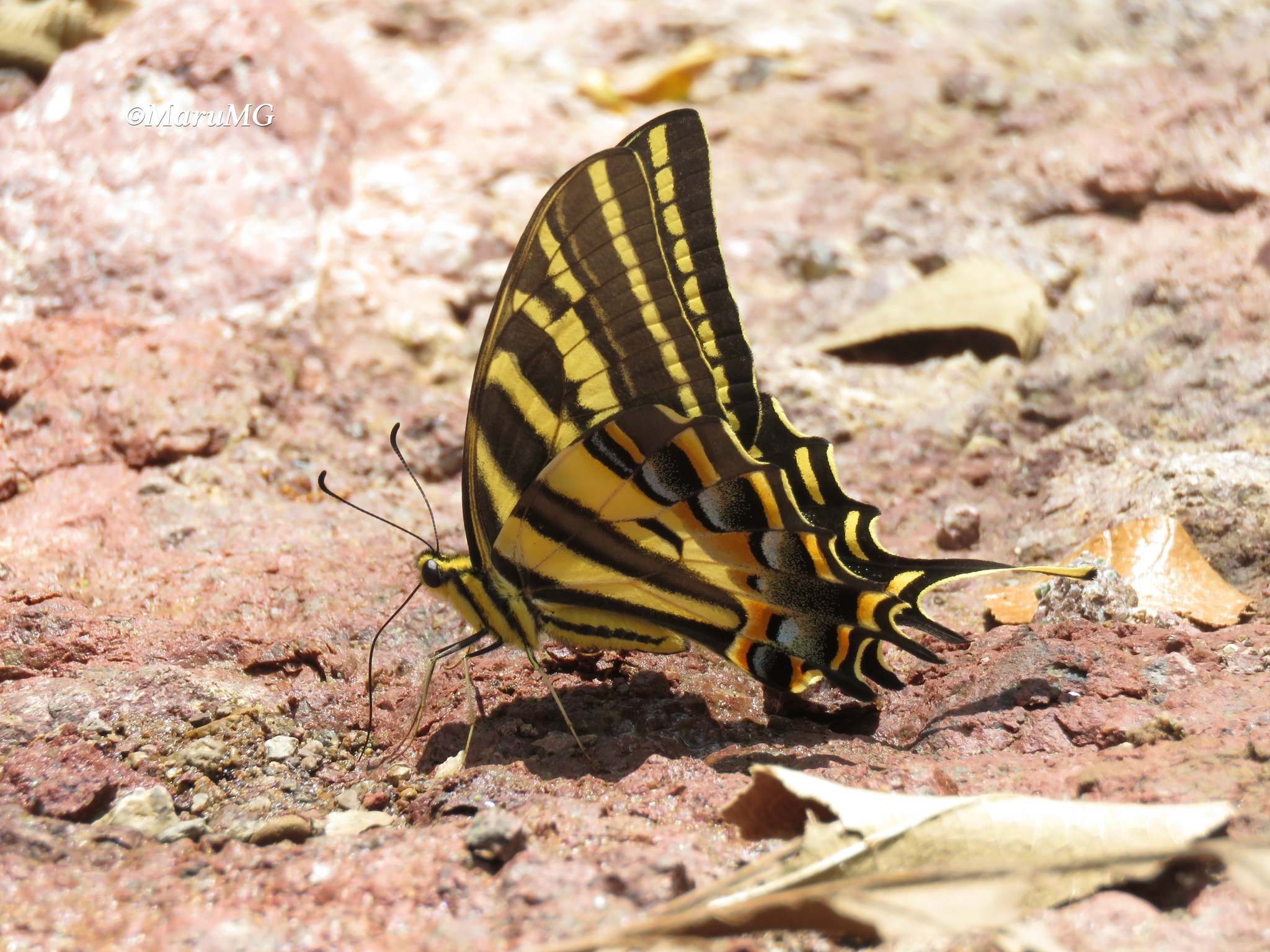
- Papilio pilumnus in Guanajuato, Mexico

Scientific classification
- Kingdom: Animalia
- Phylum: Arthropoda
- Clade: Pancrustacea
- Class: Insecta
- Order: Lepidoptera
- Family: Papilionidae
- Genus: Papilio
- Species: P. pilumnus

Binomial name
- Papilio pilumnus Boisduval, 1836

Synonyms
- Pterourus pilumnus

= Papilio pilumnus =

Three-tailed tiger swallowtail

Species of butterfly

Papilio pilumnus, the three-tailed tiger swallowtail, is a species of swallowtail butterfly from the genus Papilio that is found in Texas, Mexico and Guatemala.

The larvae feed on the leaves of Litsea species.
