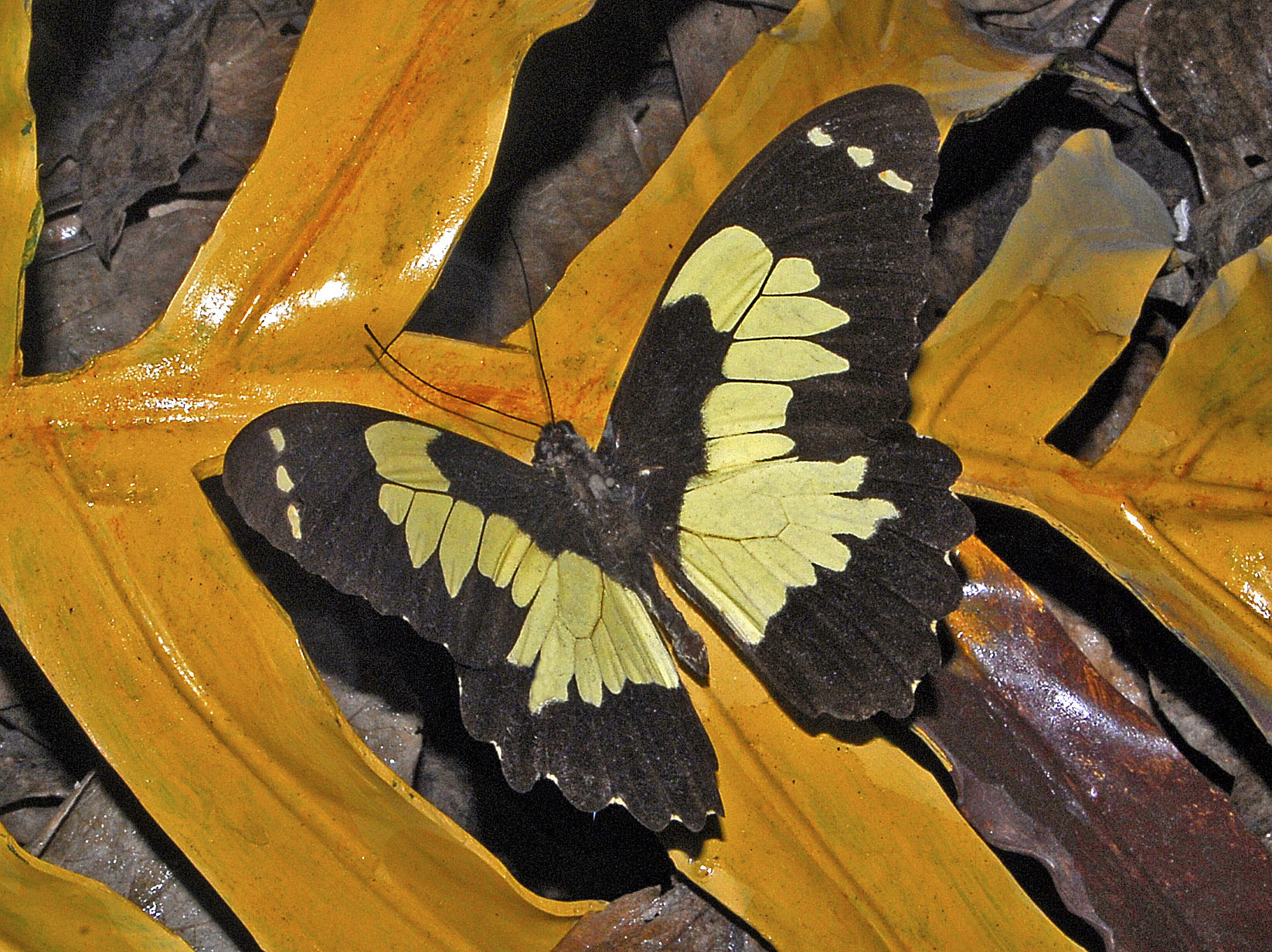

Scientific classification
- Kingdom: Animalia
- Phylum: Arthropoda
- Clade: Pancrustacea
- Class: Insecta
- Order: Lepidoptera
- Family: Papilionidae
- Genus: Papilio
- Species: P. euchenor

Binomial name
- Papilio euchenor Guérin-Ménéville, 1829

Synonyms
- Papilio axion Boisduval, 1832; Papilio godarti Montrouzier, 1856; Papilio eutropius Janson, 1886

= Papilio euchenor =

Species of butterfly

Papilio euchenor is a butterfly of the family Papilionidae.

== Distribution ==
This species can be found at Papua New Guinea, Celebes, Sumatra, Bismarck Archipelago and various surrounding islands.

== Subspecies ==
Subspecies include:

- Papilio euchenor euchenor (West Irian to Papua, Waigeu, Dampier)
- Papilio euchenor godarti Montrouzier, 1856 (D'Entrecasteaux, Woodlark)
- Papilio euchenor eutropius Janson, 1886 (Jobi)
- Papilio euchenor obsolescens Rothschild, 1895 (Aru)
- Papilio euchenor depilis Rothschild, 1895 (New Britain, Duke of York Group)
- Papilio euchenor naucles Rothschild, 1908 (Kai Islands)
- Papilio euchenor misolensis Rothschild, 1908 (Misool Islands)
- Papilio euchenor comma Joicey & Noakes, 1915 (Biak)
- Papilio euchenor rosselanus Rothschild, 1908 (Rossel Islands)
- Papilio euchenor sudestensis Rothschild, 1908 (Sudest Island)
- Papilio euchenor misimanus Rothschild, 1898 (Misima Island)
- Papilio euchenor novohibernicus Rothschild, 1896 (New Ireland)
- Papilio euchenor neohannoveranus Rothschild, 1898 (New Hanover Island)
- Papilio euchenor subcoerulea Rothschild, 1915 (Dampier Island)

== Description ==
The wingspan of Papilio euchenor can reach 100–130 mm. These large butterflies have black forewings, with a wide band of mellow yellow patches with black veins and a row of three small yellow spots near to the apex. Also the hind wings are black. They show a large mellow yellow basal area. The margins of the hindwings are ridged and without any tails. The underside of the wings is quite similar to the upside, but in the edge of the hindwings of some subspecies there are a few orange and blue markings. The body of these butterflies is black on the back, while the underside is yellow. There are no differences in the pattern between males and females. This species is rather similar to Papilio aegeus.

== Biology ==
The larvae feed on Evodia and possibly also Citrus species.

== Gallery ==
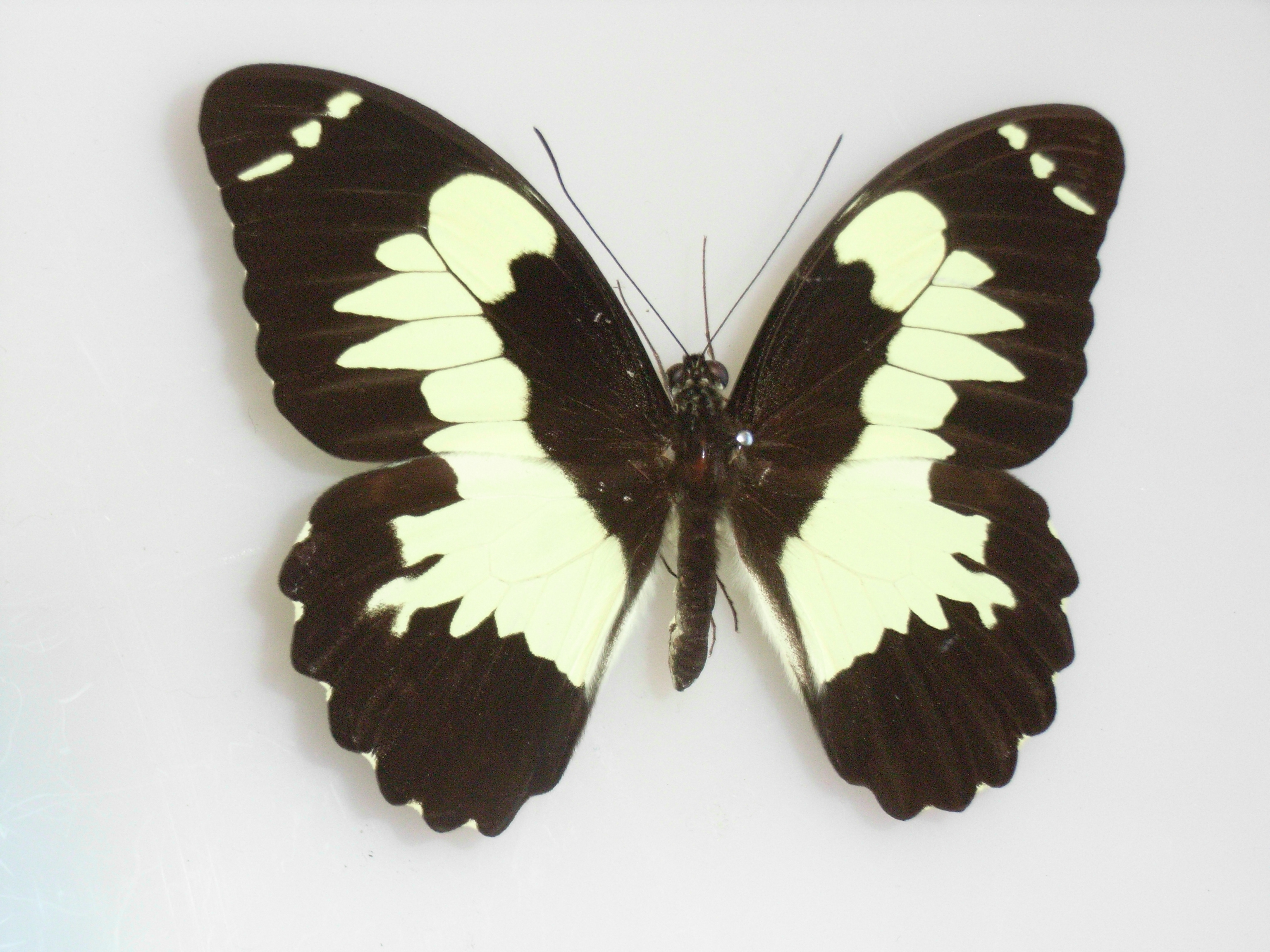
Papilio euchenor. Recto

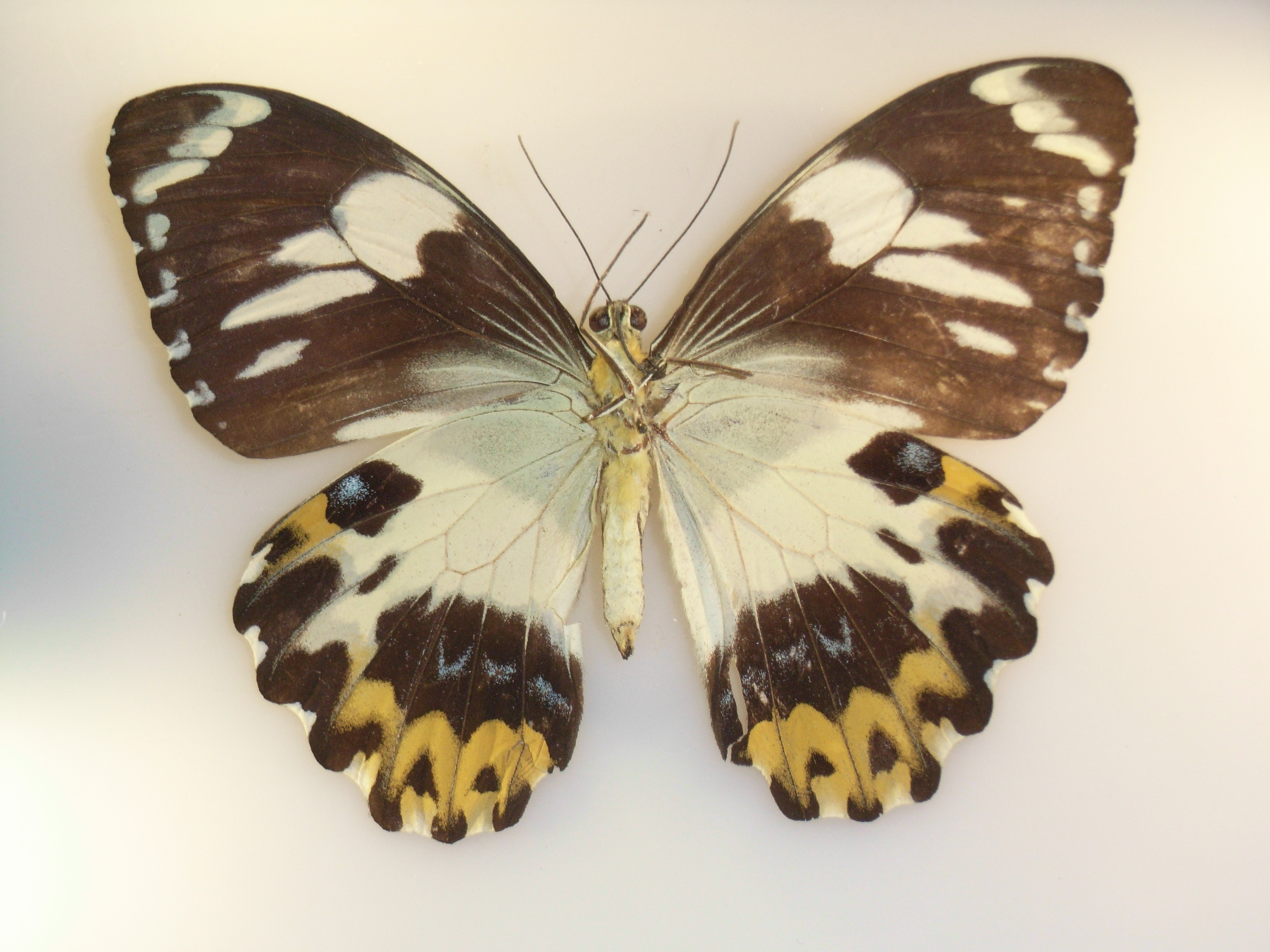
Papilio euchenor sudestensis. Verso

== Bibliography ==
- Fruhstorfer, H. (1903) Neue Papilioniden aus dem australischen Gebiet., Fruhstorfer, H. (1903) Neue Papilioniden aus dem australischen Gebiet. Deutsche Entomologische Zeitschrift Iris 16 (1): 11–16.
- Fruhstorfer, H. (1909) Neue asiatische Papilio-Rassen. (Schluß)., Fruhstorfer, H. (1909) Neue asiatische Papilio-Rassen. (Schluß). Entomologische Zeitschrift 22 (43): 177–179.
- Newman, Edward: Zoologist: a monthly journal of natural history. J. Van Voorst, 1858, S. 5890
- Rothschild, W. (1895) A revision of the Papilios of the Eastern Hemisphere, exclusive of Africa., Rothschild, W. (1895) A revision of the Papilios of the Eastern Hemisphere, exclusive of Africa. Novitates Zoologicae 2 (3): 167–463, pl 6.
- Rothschild, W. (1896) On Some New Subspecies of Papilio., Rothschild, W. (1896) On Some New Subspecies of Papilio. Novitates Zoologicae 3 (4): 421–425.
