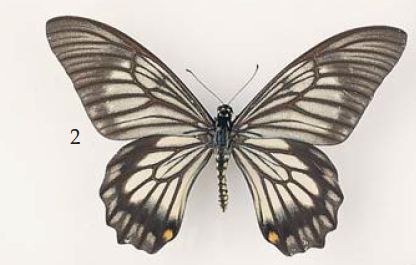
- male specimen

Scientific classification
- Kingdom: Animalia
- Phylum: Arthropoda
- Clade: Pancrustacea
- Class: Insecta
- Order: Lepidoptera
- Family: Papilionidae
- Genus: Papilio
- Species: P. veiovis

Binomial name
- Papilio veiovis Hewitson, [1865]

Synonyms
- Papilio veiovis aristyllos Fruhstorfer, 1909; Chilasa veiovis

= Papilio veiovis =

Species of butterfly

Papilio veiovis is a species of swallowtail butterfly from the genus Papilio that is found in Sulawesi.

P. veiovis Hew. (= samanganus Fruhst.) (20 d). The lateral spots of the abdomen united into transverse bands, which are interrupted above. Markings of the wings dissimilis-like; ground-colour white, often yellowish, especially on the under surface of the hindwing, the veins, the cell-stripes and a broad marginal area which encloses light double stripes black; the forewing elongated, with incurved distal margin; the hindwing at the abdominal margin much longer than in clytia, with distinctly projecting tooth at the 3. radial and yellow anal spot. The female has broader wings than the male .— North and South Celebes; the differences given by Fruhstorfer between northern and southern specimens are not confirmed by the 16 examples before me [Jordan]. The butterfly according to Fruhstorfer drinks at puddles and at the edges of brooks, the wings being kept closed.
