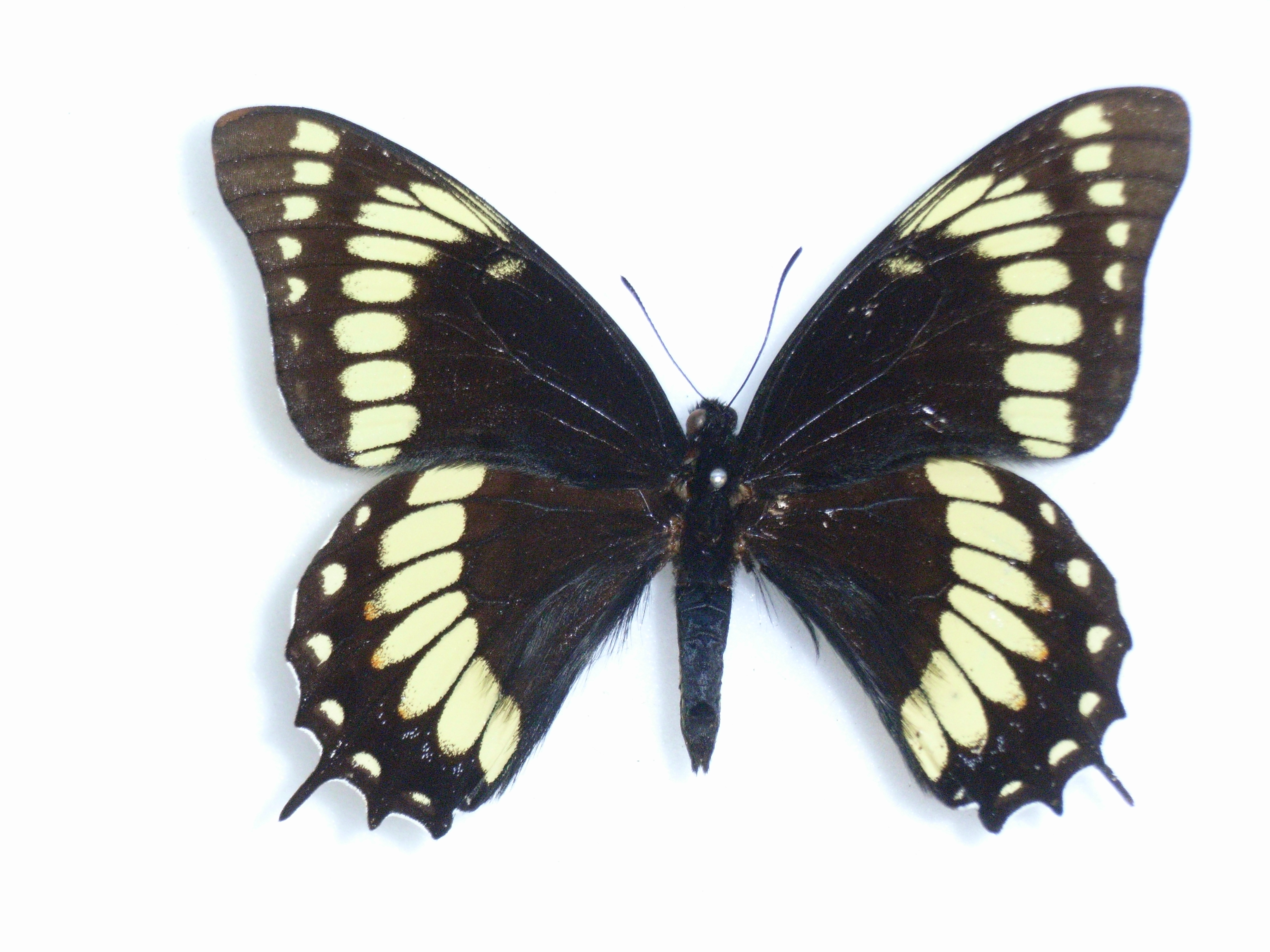

Scientific classification
- Kingdom: Animalia
- Phylum: Arthropoda
- Clade: Pancrustacea
- Class: Insecta
- Order: Lepidoptera
- Family: Papilionidae
- Genus: Papilio
- Species: P. scamander

Binomial name
- Papilio scamander Boisduval, 1836

Synonyms
- Pyrrhosticta scamander; Pterourus scamander; Papilio eurymander Hopffer, 1865; Papilio stewarti Avinoff, 1926; Papilio argentinus Nosswitz, 1927; Papilio argentinus Schreiter, 1930; Papilio dechaufouri Zikán, 1938

= Papilio scamander =

Species of butterfly

Papilio scamander, the Scamander swallowtail, is a butterfly of the family Papilionidae. It is found from eastern and south-eastern Brazil south into Argentina.

The wingspan is about 110 mm.

== Description ==
P. scamander. Cell of the forewing without spot, that of the hindwing sometimes with a small spot; a pale yellow curved discal band, broken up into spots, on both wings. Male and female very similar. Larvae and pupae described above. Brazil, common in hilly country, though not everywhere. Three geographical forms, which completely intergrade. — grayi Boisd. The Submarginal macular band of the forewing evenly curved, the discal band broadest posteriorly; the red discal spots on the under surface of the hindwing separated from the discal band. Bahia to Parané. — eurymander Hopf. The first 2 or 3 submarginal spots of the forewing more proximal than the other spots of this row. the submarginal spots of the hind wing partly pale yellow: the basal area of the hindwing beneath pale, often partly yellowish, the red discal spots small or absent. Santa Catarina and the adjoining districts of Rio Grande do Sul. — scamander Boisd. (11d). Diseal band of the upper surface more yellow; under surface of the hindwing pale yellow, with black veins and without red discal spots. Abdomen laterally pale yellow. Rio Grande do Sul.

== Subspecies ==
- Papilio scamander scamander (Brazil)
- Papilio scamander joergenseni Röber, 1925 (Bolivia, north-western Argentina)
- Papilio scamander grayi Boisduval, 1836 (Brazil (Rio Grande do Sul, Paraná, Minas Gerais, São Paulo))
