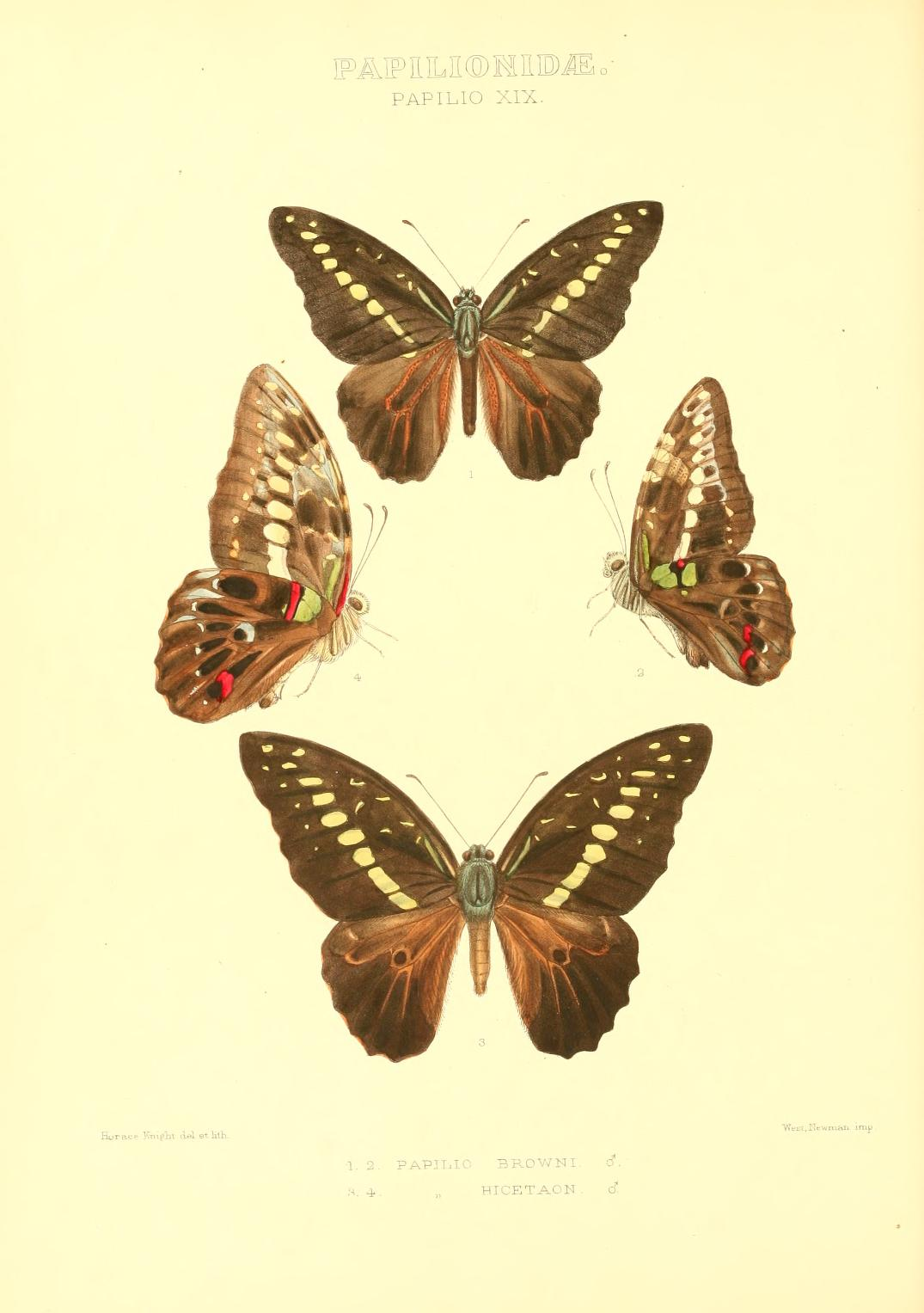
- Figures 3 and 4

Scientific classification
- Kingdom: Animalia
- Phylum: Arthropoda
- Clade: Pancrustacea
- Class: Insecta
- Order: Lepidoptera
- Family: Papilionidae
- Genus: Graphium
- Species: G. hicetaon

Binomial name
- Graphium hicetaon (Mathew, 1886)

Synonyms
- Papilio hicetaon Mathew, 1886

= Graphium hicetaon =

Species of butterfly

Graphium hicetaon is a butterfly found in the Solomon Islands - Bougainville Island, Choiseul Island, Shortland Island, Florida Island, Guadalcanal, New Georgia Group and Ugi Island - that belongs to the swallowtail family.

== Description ==
The discal band of the forewing broader than in browni, but narrower than in wallacei; upper surface of the hindwing entirely or almost entirely without costal spot, beneath the red costal streak reaches to the cell, distally to this streak there is either no green spot or only a very small one, on the other hand at its proximal side there is invariably a large green double spot, which always only extends to the cell.

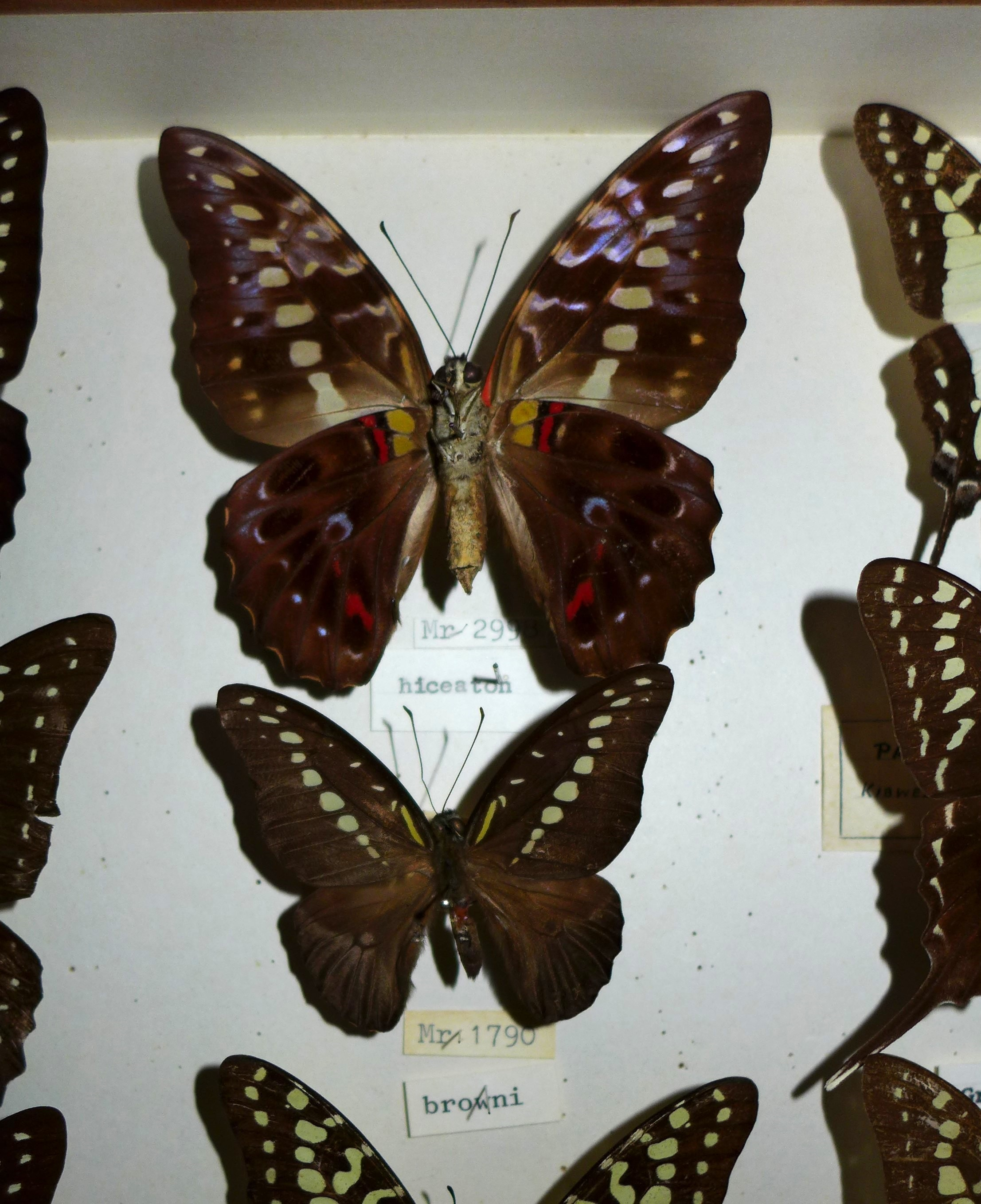

== Taxonomy ==
Graphium hicetaon belongs to the wallacei species group. This clade has four members:

- Graphium wallacei (Hewitson, 1858)
- Graphium hicetaon (Mathew, 1886)
- Graphium browni (Godman & Salvin, 1879)
- Graphium sandawanum Yamamoto, 1977

The holotype is in the Natural History Museum, London.
