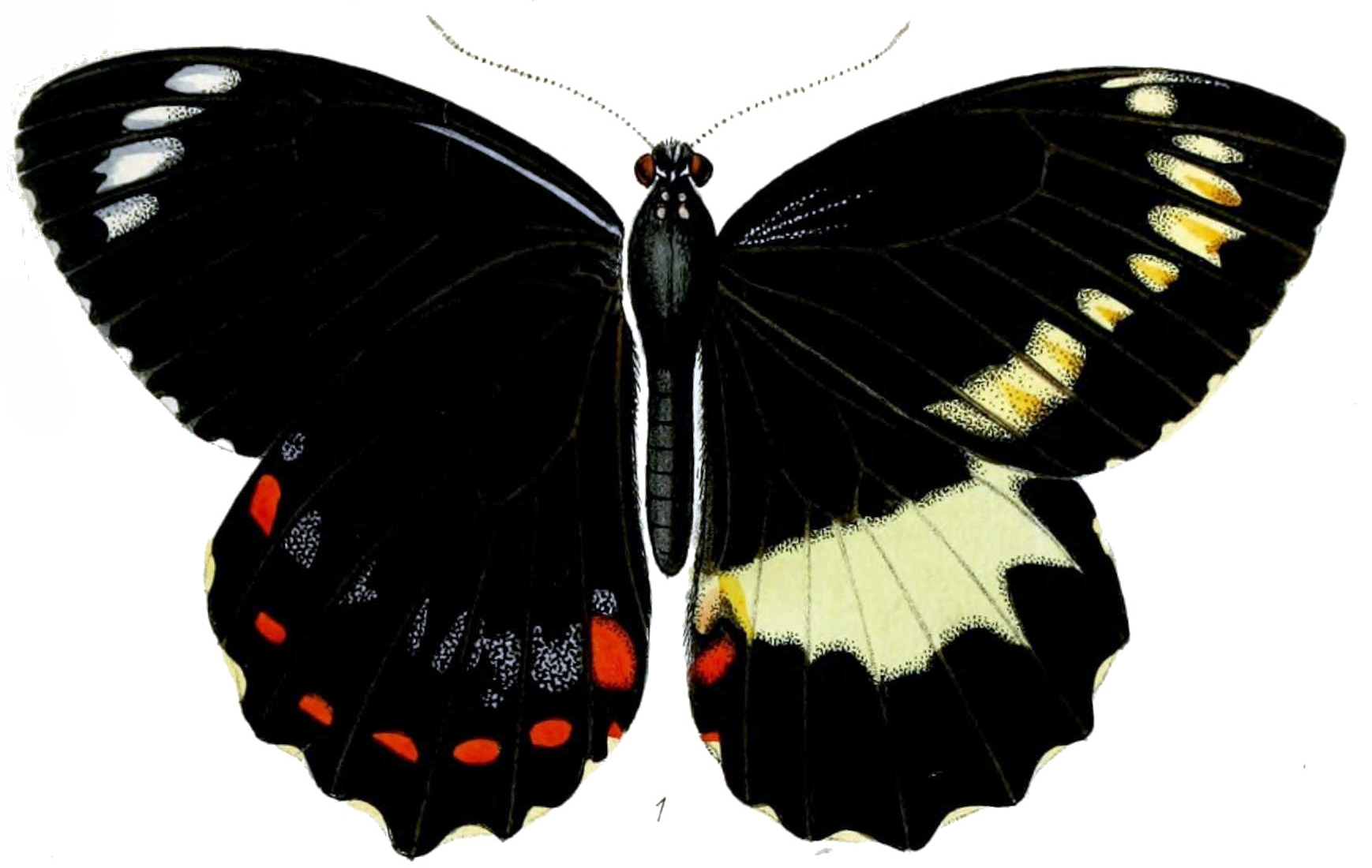
- Ventral surface of the wings on the left, dorsal surface on the right

Scientific classification
- Kingdom: Animalia
- Phylum: Arthropoda
- Clade: Pancrustacea
- Class: Insecta
- Order: Lepidoptera
- Family: Papilionidae
- Genus: Papilio
- Species: P. erskinei

Binomial name
- Papilio erskinei Mathew, 1886

= Papilio erskinei =

Species of swallowtail butterfly

Papilio erskinei is a species of swallowtail butterfly from the genus Papilio that is found on Ugi Island.

In Seitz it is described (as a species) "P. erskinei Math. Male: forewing more rounded than in the two preceding species [Papilio woodfordi,Papilio ptolychus] above with a row of spots from the costal to the hindmargin, all the spots separated with the exception of the last three, beneath with four large, separated subapical spots. The band of the forewing touches the apex of the cell and is as broad in the middle as the black marginal area; the red anal spot large; beneath a complete row of red submarginal spots. — Ugi; only 1 male known (in coll. Godman, now in the British Museum)".Karl Jordan in Seitz.

== Taxonomy ==
Formerly ranked as a subspecies of Papilio bridgei. This was revised by Tennent, W.J. (1999).

Papilio erskinei is a member of the aegeus species-group. The clade members are

- Papilio aegeus Donovan, 1805
- Papilio bridgei Mathew, 1886
  - ? Papilio erskinei Mathew, 1886
- Papilio gambrisius Cramer, [1777]
- Papilio inopinatus Butler, 1883
- Papilio ptolychus Godman & Salvin, 1888
- Papilio tydeus C. & R. Felder, 1860
- Papilio weymeri Niepelt, 1914
- Papilio woodfordi Godman & Salvin, 1888
