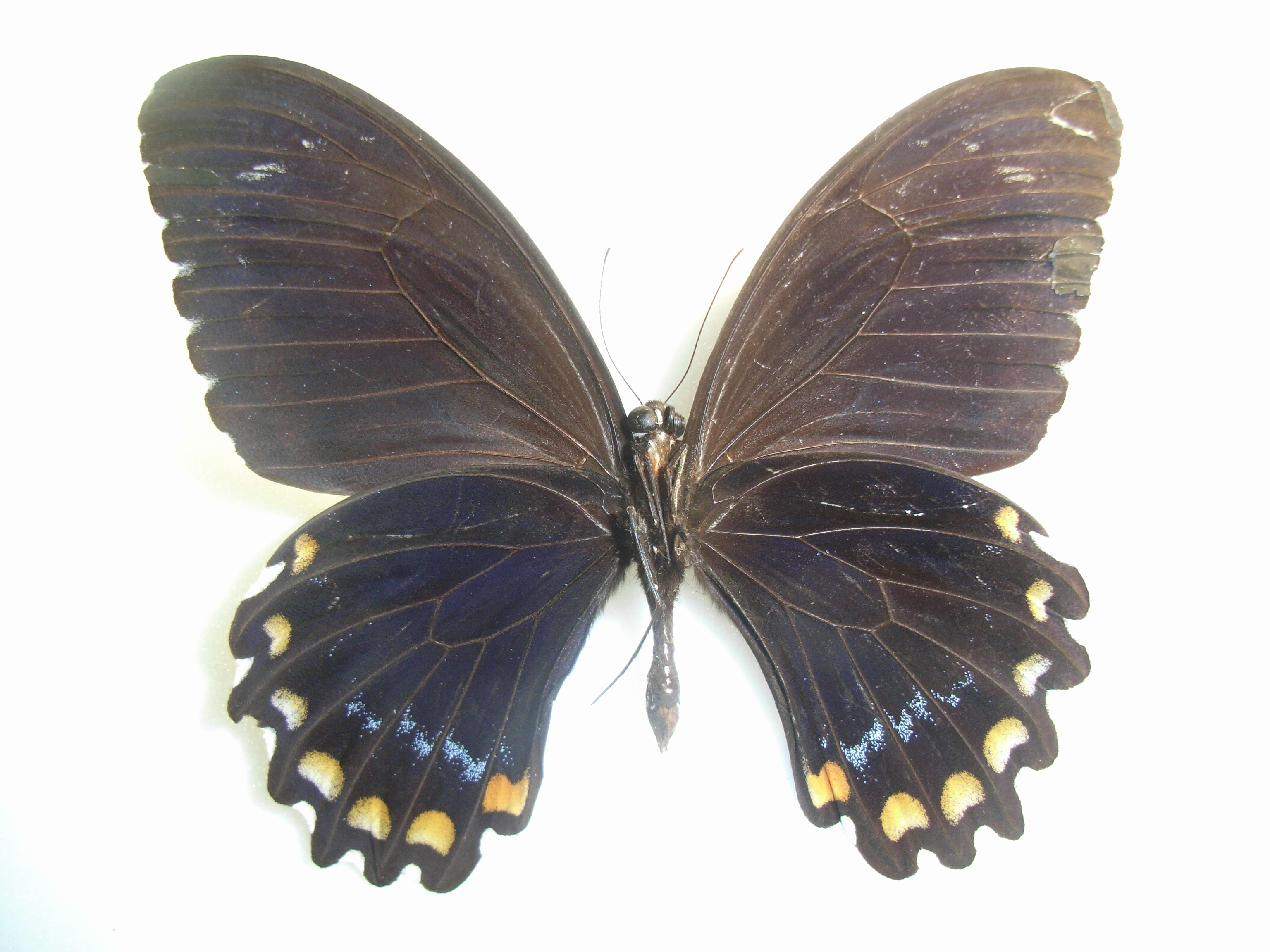

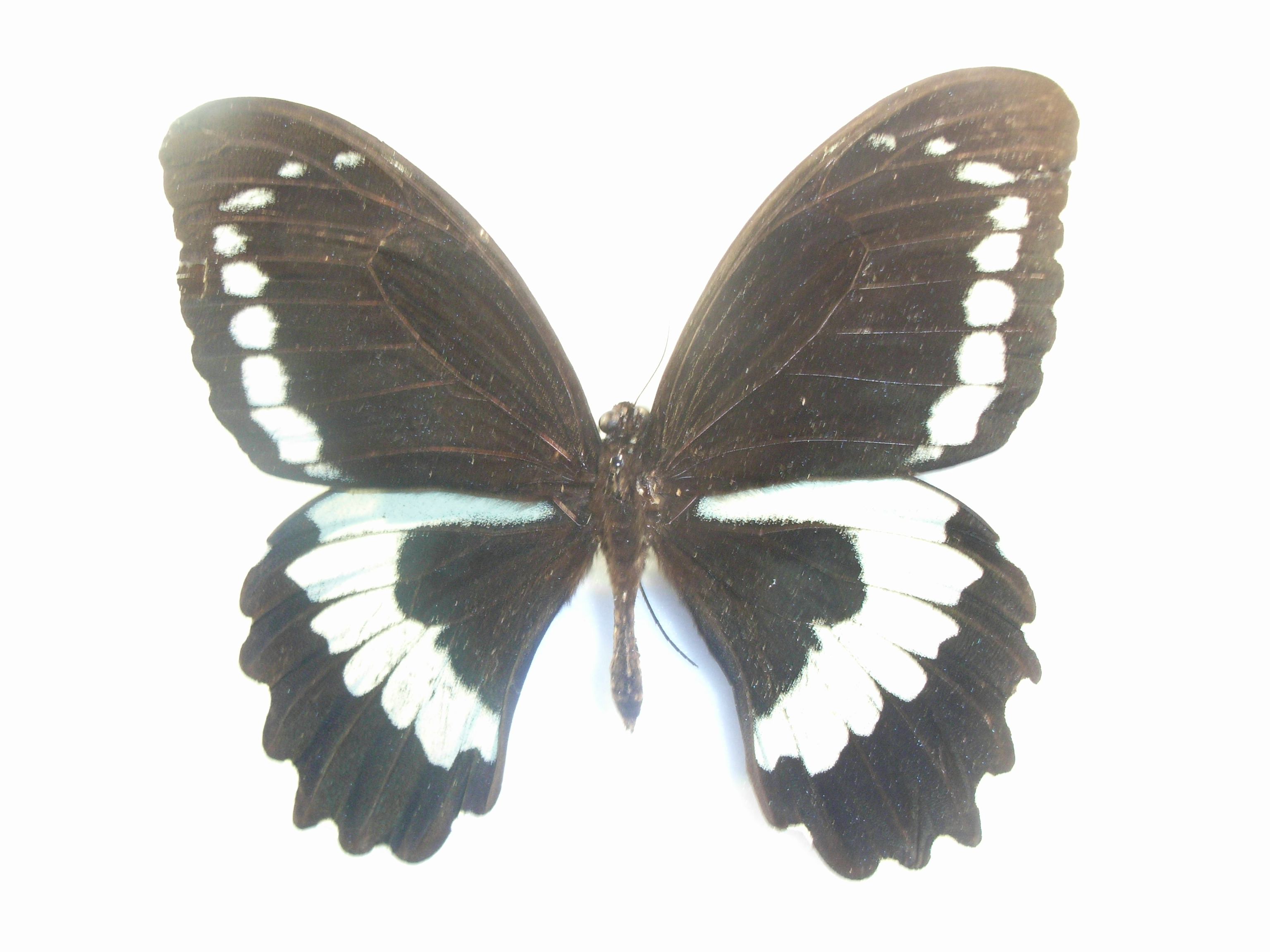

Scientific classification
- Kingdom: Animalia
- Phylum: Arthropoda
- Clade: Pancrustacea
- Class: Insecta
- Order: Lepidoptera
- Family: Papilionidae
- Genus: Papilio
- Species: P. bridgei

Binomial name
- Papilio bridgei Mathew, 1886

Synonyms
- Papilio hecataeus Godman & Salvin, 1888; Papilio tryoni Mathew, 1889; Papilio prospero Grose-Smith, 1889

= Papilio bridgei =

Species of butterfly

Papilio bridgei is a swallowtail butterfly of the Papilioninae subfamily. It is found on various islands in the Solomons group. It is not threatened.

== Description ==
The wingspan is 140–150 millimetres (5.5–5.9 in).The sexes very different. Male black as in Papilio aegeus, forewing with macular band from the costal to the hindmargin, or with subapical band and a patch placed before the hindmargin. The white band of the hindwing formed as in P. aegeus, i. e. the 1. patch prolonged basad; beneath the hindwing round the cell, which are distally rounded and all closely approximated to it, the 1. spot sometimes indistinct or obsolete. Larva very similar to that of P. aegeus, green, with irregular, short light longitudinal streaks, black head, black legs and above them a broad black longitudinal stripe, from which 4 bands emanate, on the 4., 7., 9: and last segments; the spines as in P. aegeus; on Citrus, in the forest. Pupa as in P. aegeus, in proportion to its size somewhat more slender. The butterfly in woods, where it is not easy to catch on account of the thick undergrowth and its swift flight. Appears to occur on all the islands of the Solomon Group.Karl Jordan in Seitz.See this work for the forms.

== Biology ==
The larvae feed on Citrus species.

== Subspecies ==
- Papilio bridgei bridgei (Bougainville, Choiseul, Santa Isabel, Shortland, Treasury Islands, Fauro Islands)
- Papilio bridgei ortegae Rothschild, 1904 (Florida Islands)
- Papilio bridgei hecataeus Godman & Salvin, 1888 (Guadalcanal)
- Papilio bridgei tryoni Mathew, 1889 (Ugi, San Cristobal)
- Papilio bridgei prospero Grose-Smith, 1889 (New Georgia Islands)

== Taxonomy ==
Papilio bridgei is a member of the aegeus species-group . The clade members are

- Papilio aegeus Donovan, 1805
- Papilio bridgei Mathew, 1886
  - ? Papilio erskinei Mathew, 1886
- Papilio gambrisius Cramer, [1777]
- Papilio inopinatus Butler, 1883
- Papilio ptolychus Godman & Salvin, 1888
- Papilio tydeus C. & R. Felder, 1860
- Papilio weymeri Niepelt, 1914
- Papilio woodfordi Godman & Salvin, 1888

== Philately ==
Papilio bridgei depicted on a 5 January 1982 Solomon Islands postage stamp (SLB914: 25c).

== Etymology ==
Named for "Captain Cyprian A. G. Bridge who commanded H.M. ship Espiègle during her long and interesting Commission of nearly four years, a greater portion of which time was spent among the islands of the Western Pacific."
