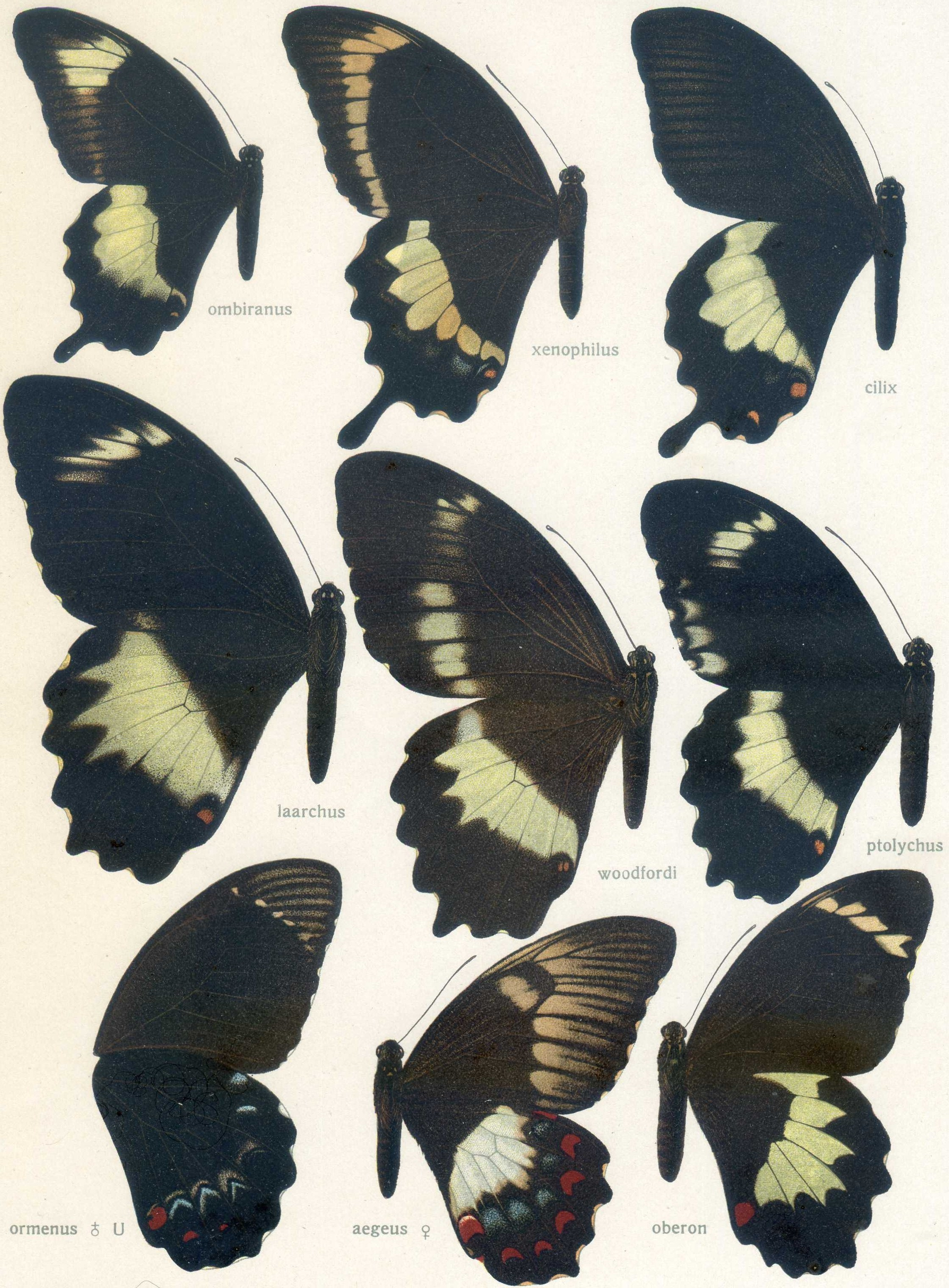
- Papilio ptolychus and related species in Adalbert Seitz Fauna Indoaustralica

Scientific classification
- Kingdom: Animalia
- Phylum: Arthropoda
- Clade: Pancrustacea
- Class: Insecta
- Order: Lepidoptera
- Family: Papilionidae
- Genus: Papilio
- Species: P. ptolychus

Binomial name
- Papilio ptolychus Godman & Salvin, 1888

= Papilio ptolychus =

Species of butterfly

Papilio ptolychus is a species of swallowtail butterfly from the genus Papilio that is found on Guadalcanal and Florida Island.

== Description ==
From Rothschild, 1895, Novit. Zool. 2 (3): 301

Male. Differs from P. laarchus (Godm. & Salv.) especially in the forewings having four white spots posteriorly close to the outer margin, besides the subapical white band, and in the band of the hindwings being as narrow as in P. bridgei Matthew.

Some specimens have on the upperside of the hindwings a small, ochraceous, submarginal spot between the lower median nervules; below, the series of submarginal spots is always complete, but the spots are often very feebly marked.

Female. Similar to the male; the marginal spots to the forewings and the submarginal markings to the under surface of the hindwings are rather larger; above, the hindwings have three submarginal spots in my single example.

Hab. Solomon Islands: Guadalcanar Island

From Godman and Salvin Ann. Mag. nat. Hist. (6) 1 (2): 99. Appended to original description (in Latin)

It is allied to P. erskinei recently described by Mr. Mathew from a specimen captured by himself on the island of Ugi. It differs from this specimen in having the discal band of the primaries completely severed, the costal portion being concentrated in a patch beyond the cell; the rest of this band consists of four spots placed close to the outer margin instead of at some distance from it. In other respects the two species are very much alike.

== Taxonomy ==
Papilio ptolychus is a member of the aegeus species-group. The clade members are

- Papilio aegeus Donovan, 1805
- Papilio bridgei Mathew, 1886
  - ? Papilio erskinei Mathew, 1886
- Papilio gambrisius Cramer, [1777]
- Papilio inopinatus Butler, 1883
- Papilio ptolychus Godman & Salvin, 1888
- Papilio tydeus C. & R. Felder, 1860
- Papilio weymeri Niepelt, 1914
- Papilio woodfordi Godman & Salvin, 1888
