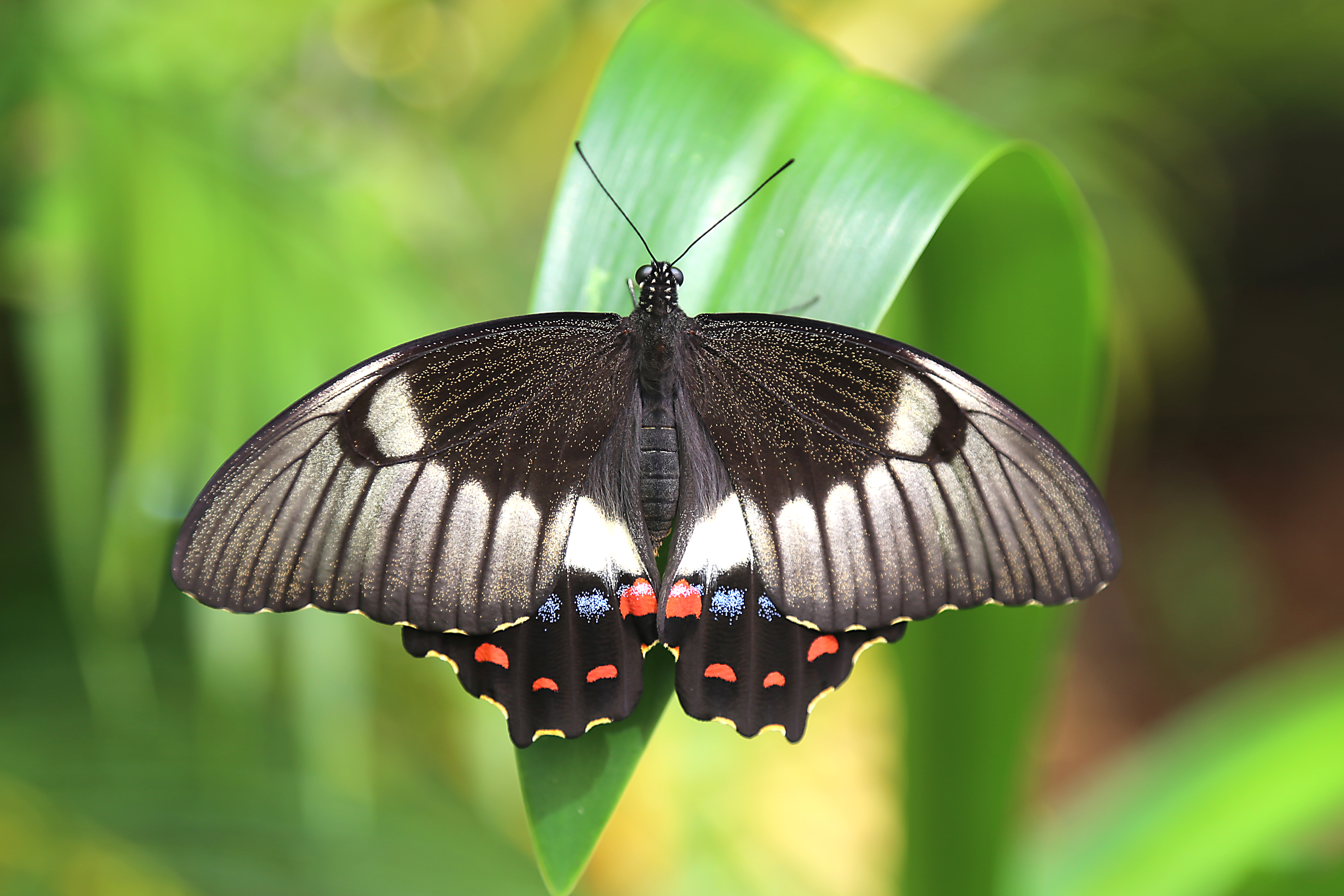
- Female, Cairns, Queensland
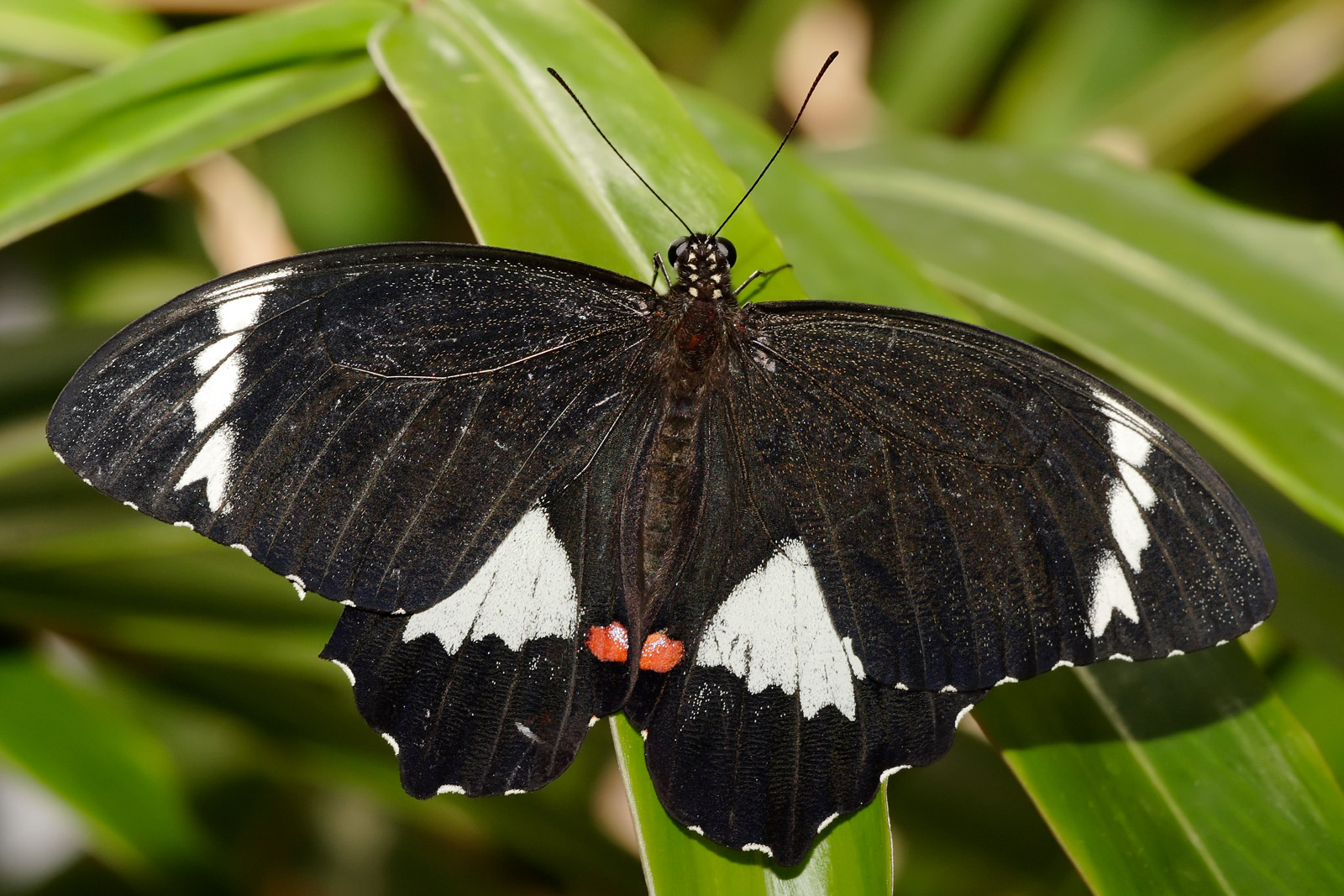
- Male, Melbourne Zoo

Scientific classification
- Kingdom: Animalia
- Phylum: Arthropoda
- Clade: Pancrustacea
- Class: Insecta
- Order: Lepidoptera
- Family: Papilionidae
- Genus: Papilio
- Species: P. aegeus

Binomial name
- Papilio aegeus Donovan, 1805

Subspecies
- P. a. aegeus (Donovan, 1805); P. a. ormenus (Guérin-Méneville, 1830)
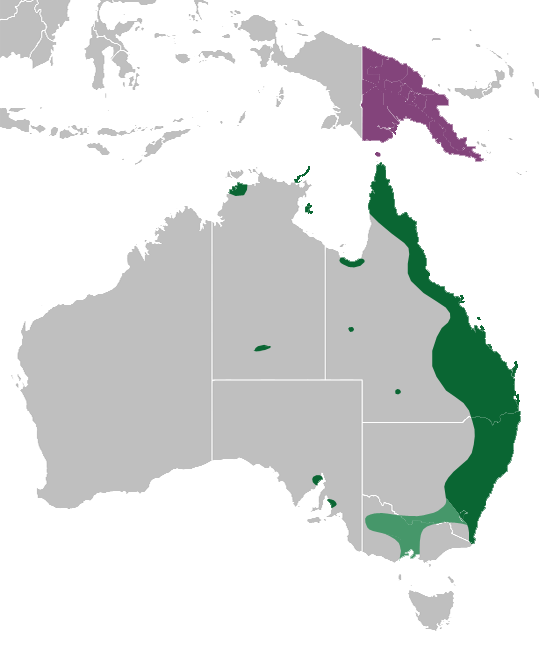
- Range of orchard swallowtail P. a. aegeus; P. a. ormenus P. a. aegeus temporary range

Synonyms
- Princeps aegeus (Donovan, 1805); Papilio (Princeps) aegeus Donovan, 1805; Menelaides aegeus (Donovan, 1805); Papilio (Menelaides) aegeus Donovan 1805; Papilio erectheus Donovan, 1805; Papilio erectheus Boisduval, 1832; Papilio oberon Grose-Smith, 1897; Papilio doddi Oberthür, 1916

= Papilio aegeus =

Orchard swallowtail butterfly

Species of butterfly

Papilio aegeus, the orchard swallowtail butterfly or large citrus butterfly is a species of butterfly from the family Papilionidae, that is found in eastern Australia and Papua New Guinea.

The larvae of this species are sometimes considered a pest, due to their feeding on citrus leaves in suburban gardens.

== Description ==
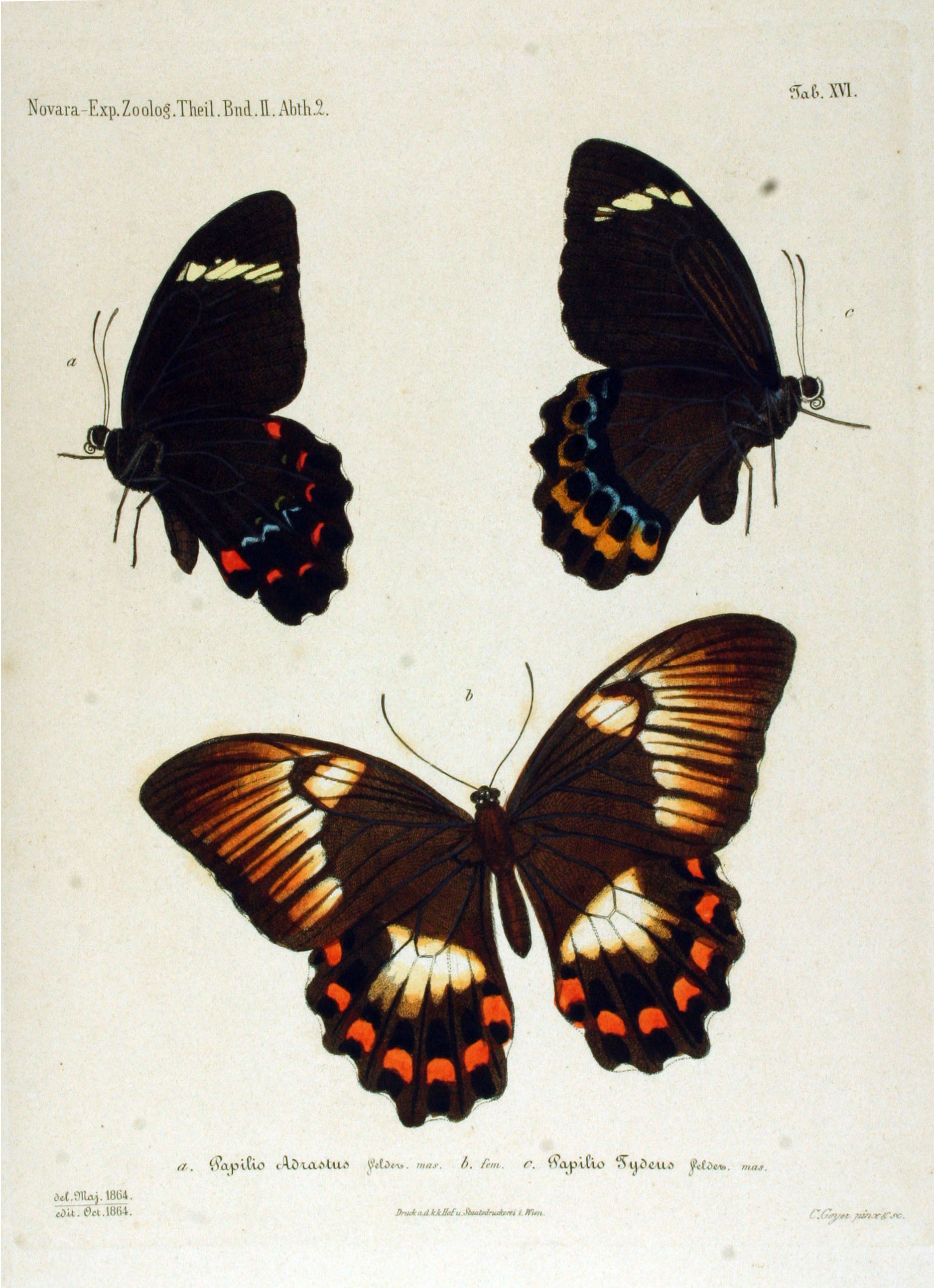
Illustration of adults

Both male and female have black forewings with a white stripe, though there is more white overall on the female forewing. The hindwing is again black, and there is a white swath through the middle. Here the markings differ in that the female has chains of red to orange and blue crescents toward the edge. The markings on the underside are similar to those on top. The body is black. The wingspan is about 140 millimetres (5.5 in) in females and 120 millimetres (4.7 in) in males, making it rather large overall and the largest butterfly commonly seen in at least part of its range.

Despite being a swallowtail, which group derives its name from the distinctive tails on the hindwing, this characteristic is entirely absent.

== Description in Seitz ==
Karl Jordan in Seitz . describes the forma (pages 65–67)

== Distribution ==
Papilio aegeus can be found in every state in Australia except Tasmania. Western Australia has well established colonies in the Albany region. Some people are promoting the controlled propagation of eggs and caterpillars in Western Australia, but it is generally found in eastern Australia. It is especially common in Queensland and is the largest butterfly commonly found in Brisbane where there are many citrus trees, on which the larvae feed. During summer, the distribution is temporarily extended to Victoria. Adults are more abundant during late summer and autumn in cc. NSW.

The subspecies P. a. ormenus is found on Papua New Guinea and Thursday Island.

A differentiating feature between males of P. a. aegeus and P. a. ormenus is that P. a. aegeus males have a red spot on the above side of each hindwing, which is absent in the males of P. a. ormenus.

Other subspecies occur on islands in the Banda Sea and the Bismarck Sea.

== Variation ==
=== Subspecies ===
- Papilio aegeus aegeus — Cape York - East Victoria, South Australia
- Papilio aegeus adrastus C. & R. Felder, [1864] — Banda Group
- Papilio aegeus aegatinus Rothschild, 1908 — Noemfoor Island
- Papilio aegeus goramensis Rothschild, 1908 — Goram Island
- Papilio aegeus keianus Rothschild, 1896 — Kai Island
- Papilio aegeus kissuanus Rothschild, 1908 — Watubela Island, Goram Island
- Papilio aegeus oritas Godman & Salvin, 1879 — New Ireland, New Hanover
- Papilio aegeus ormenulus Fruhstorfer, 1902 — Fergusson Island
- Papilio aegeus ormenus Guérin-Méneville, [1831] — Aru, Missol, Salawari, Jobi, Waigen, West Irian, Papua, New Guinea, Trobriand, D'Entrecastreaux, Woodlark, Lousiades, Torres Straits Is
- Papilio aegeus othello Grose-Smith, 1894 — Biak
- Papilio aegeus websteri Grose-Smith, 1894 — New Britain

=== Forms ===
Females of both P. a. aegeus and P. a. ormenus have three forms; regular, pale and dark. The pale form has yellow spots on the hindwings, compared to the usual red spots. The forewings are almost completely white. The front wings of the dark form are almost completely black and the hindwings have a smaller white patch.

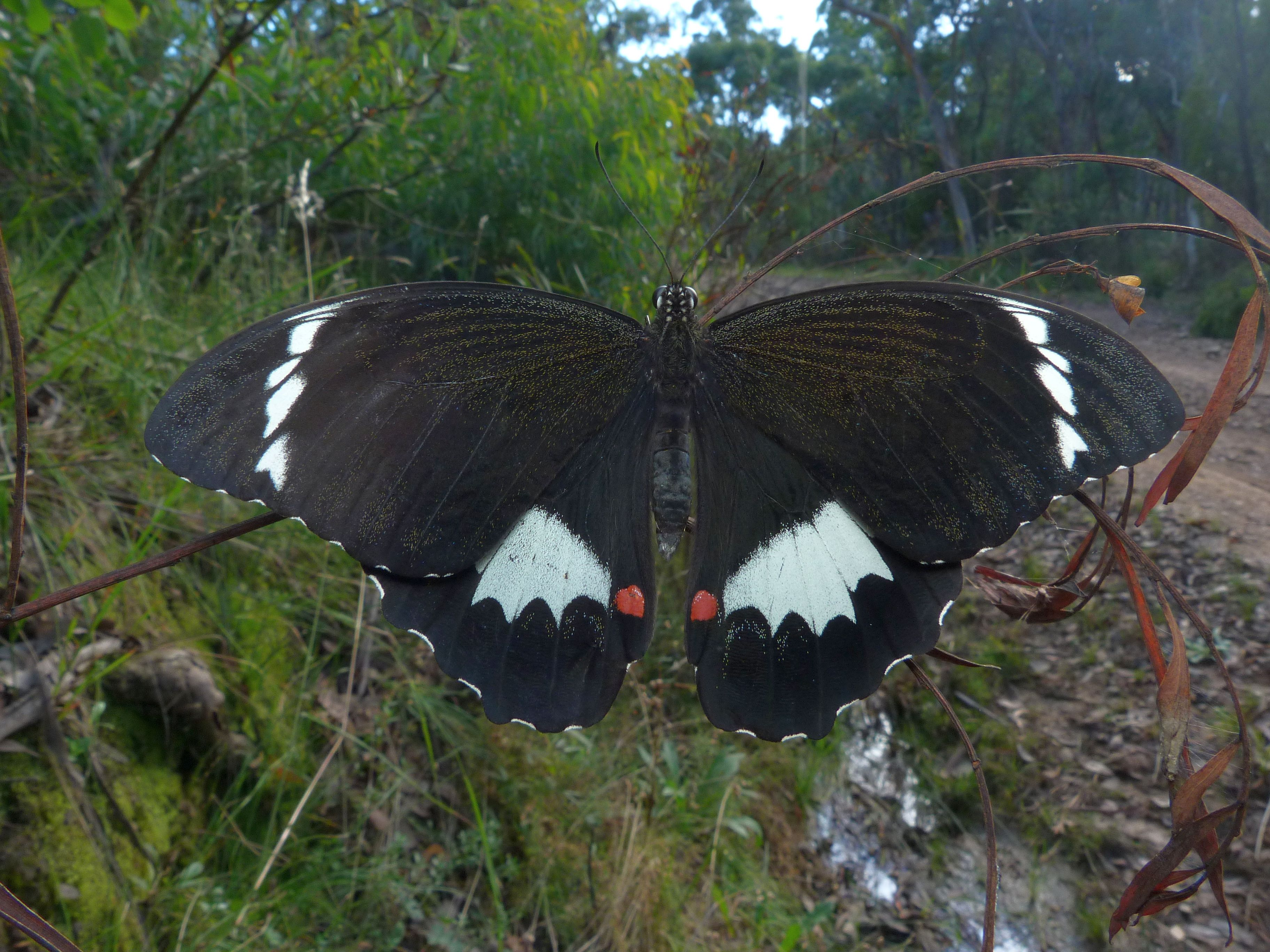
P. a. aegeus (male)

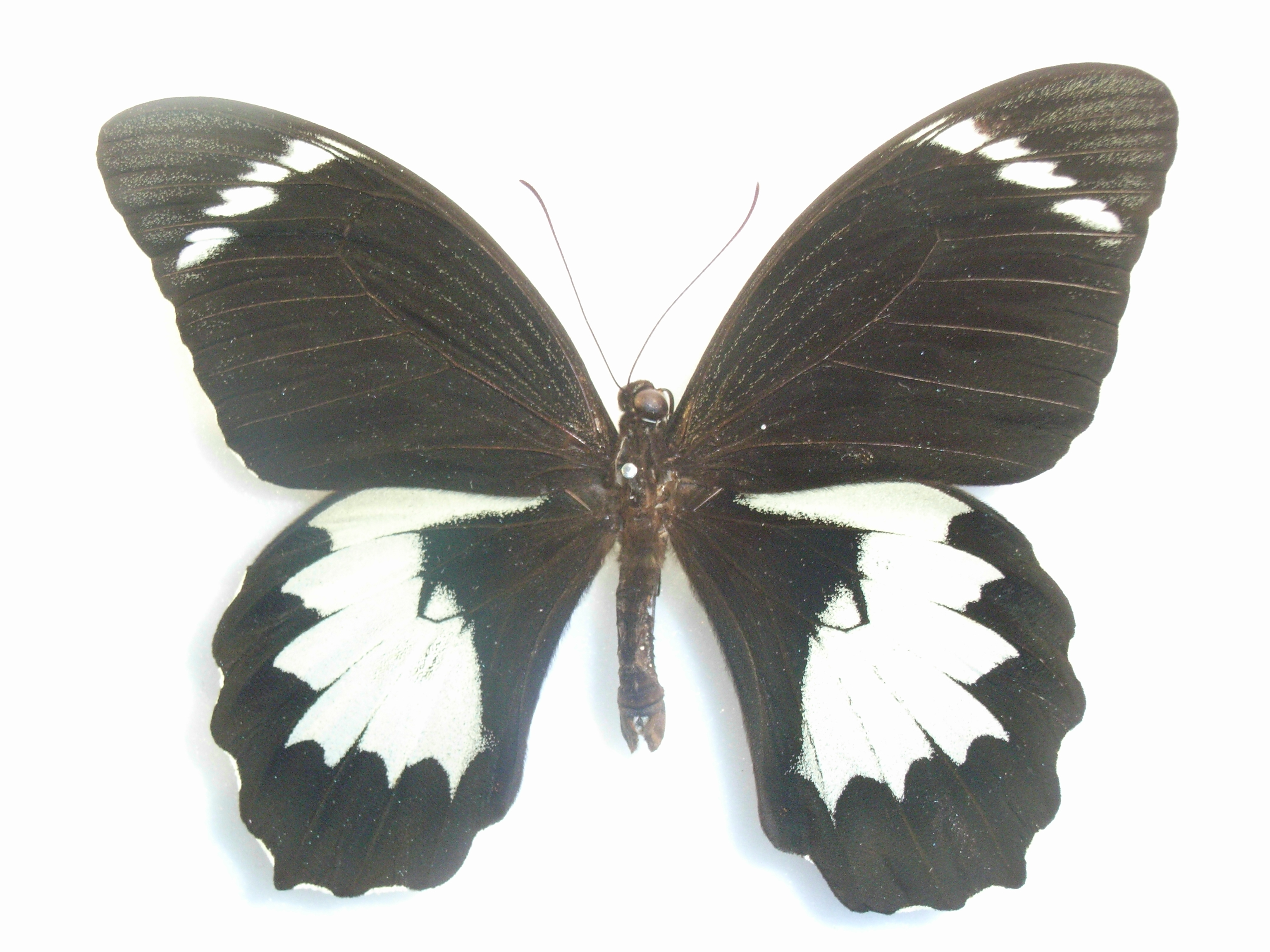
P. a. ormenus (male)

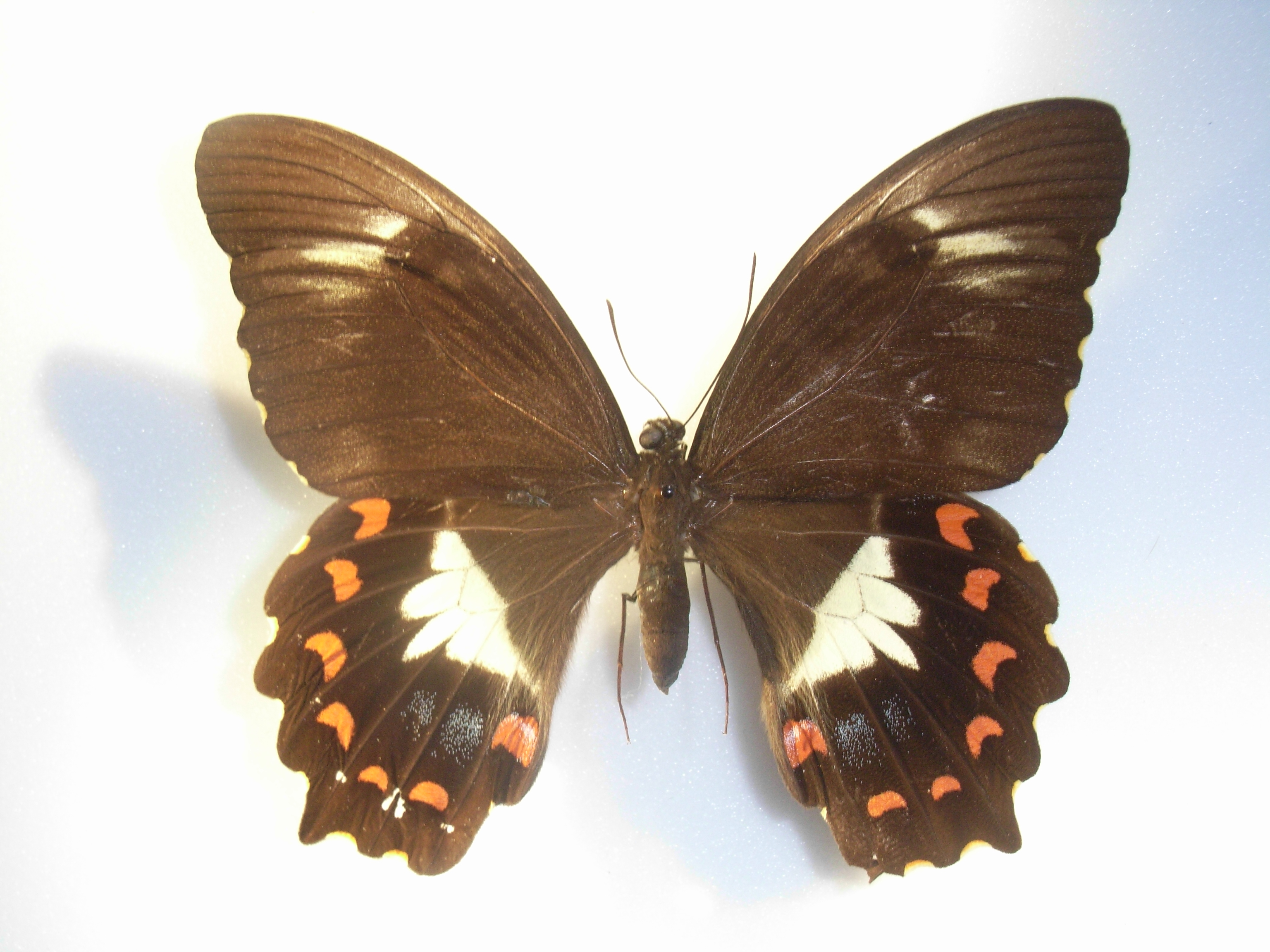
Dark form (female)

== Life cycle ==
=== Egg ===
The female lays creamy white, smooth, spherical eggs with an approximate diameter of 0.5 millimetres individually on the upper surface of the leaves and shoots of host plants, primarily tropical to subtropical members of the family Rutaceae, which includes introduced and native citrus. The eggs will hatch about one week later.

=== Larva ===
The early instars are brown with three white patches, one the: thorax, above the first pair of prolegs, and one on 8th and 9th segment of the abdomen. It is lined with black and white tubercles. The larva only feed on their food plants, citrus. Feeding usually takes place during the day and resting on the upperside of leaves during the night, resembling fresh bird droppings.

The later instars are green with irregular white, yellow or brown markings that run diagonally up/back from the bottom edge of the thorax to the 4th and 6th segments. After about four weeks, the larva may have reached a length of 60 millimetres (2.4 in) and be ready to pupate.

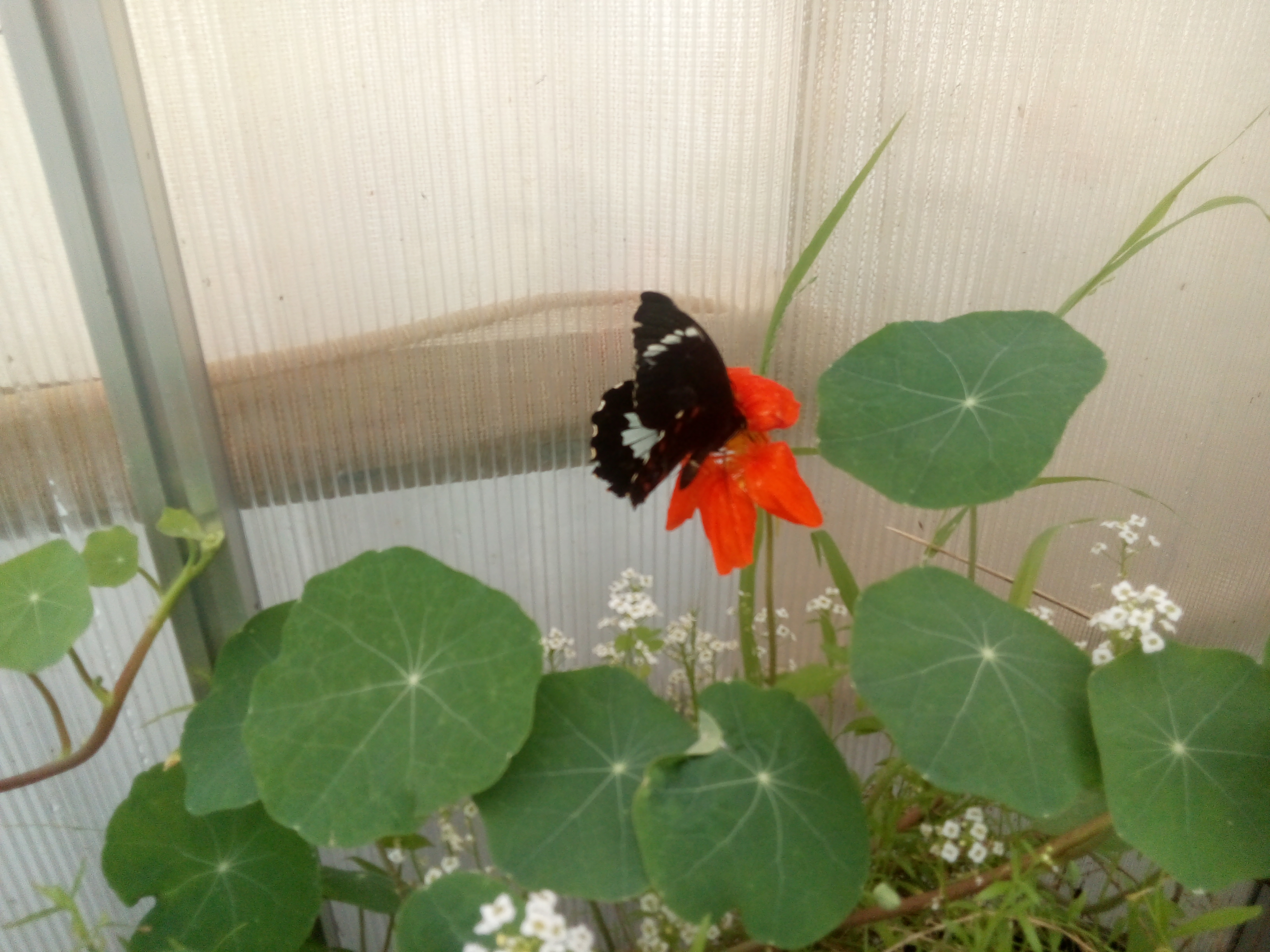
Male Orchard Swallowtail feeding from Nasturtium flowers.

The larvae are sometimes parasitised by other parasitic insects. Like other swallowtail butterflies, when disturbed, the caterpillar erects its bright red osmeterium from behind the head, releasing the smell of citrus, to drive predators away.

=== Pupa ===
The pupa is coloured in cryptic grey, green or brown, depending on the colour of the stem it is attached to. The chrysalis is fastened to a stem of the host plant by means of a cremaster. A thin girdle of silk keeps the head end of the chrysalis uppermost during pupation. Depending on the season, an imago will emerge from the chrysalis, approximately one to six months later.

=== Images of life cycle ===
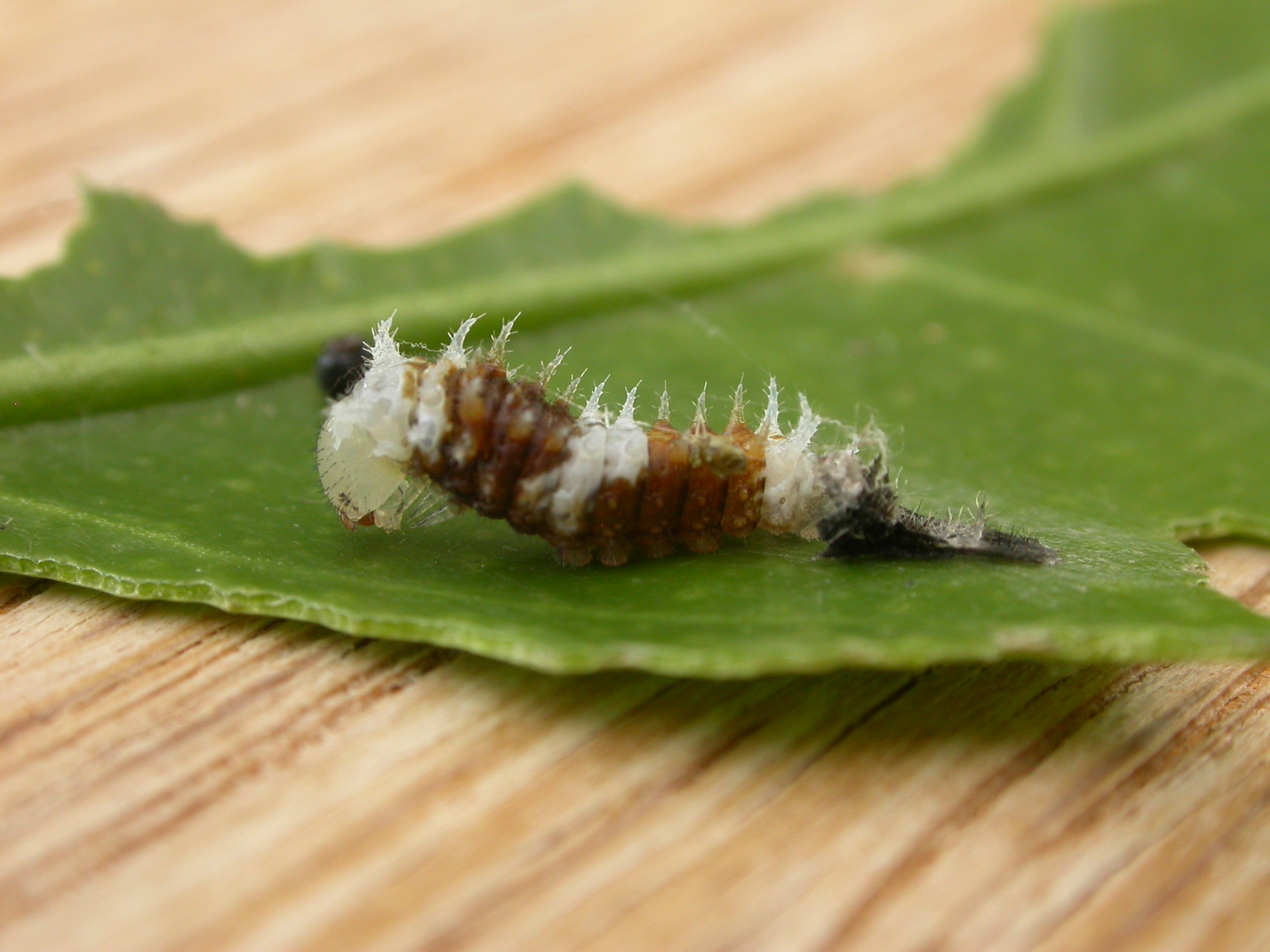
An early instar caterpillar

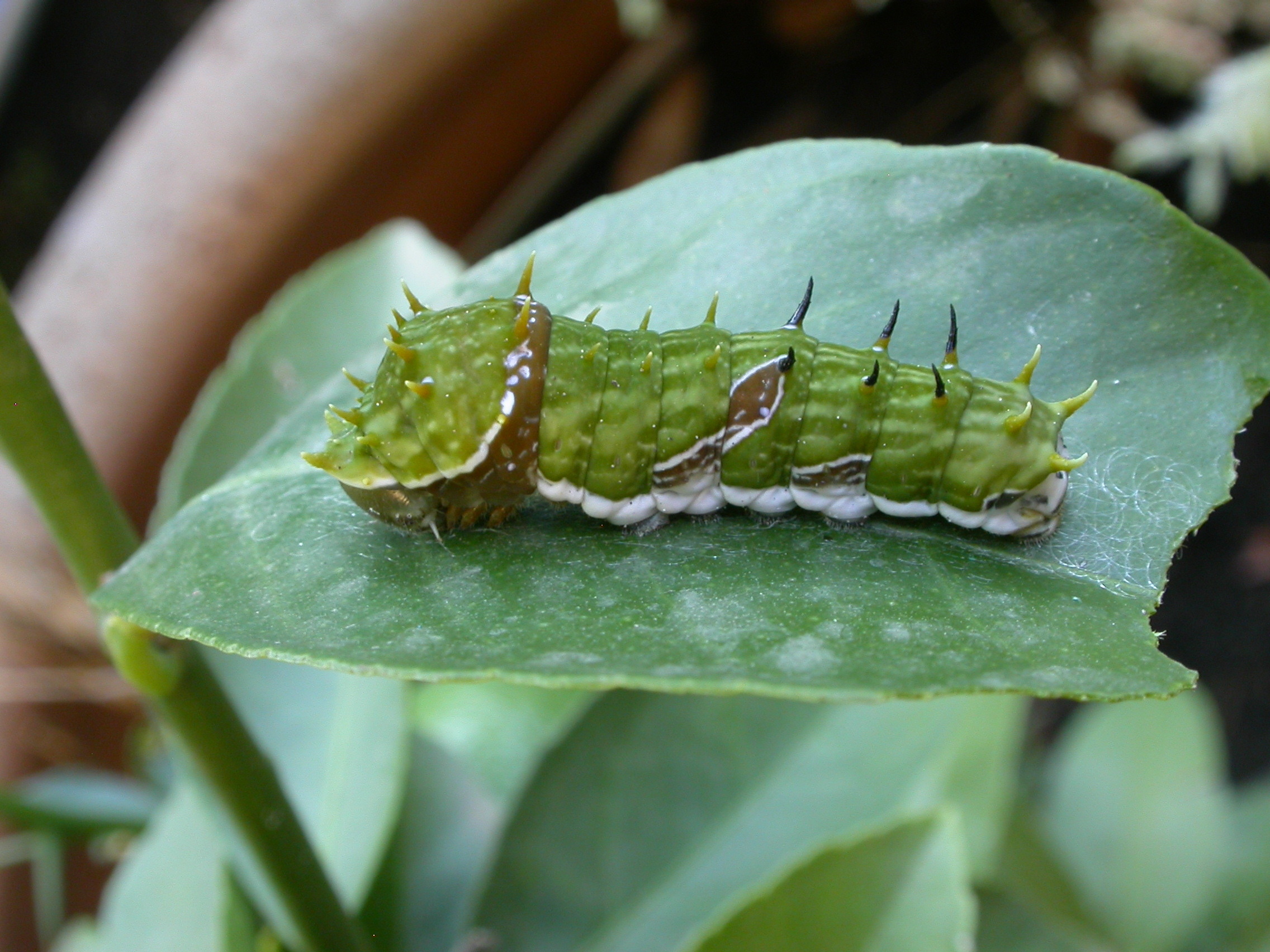
A later instar caterpillar

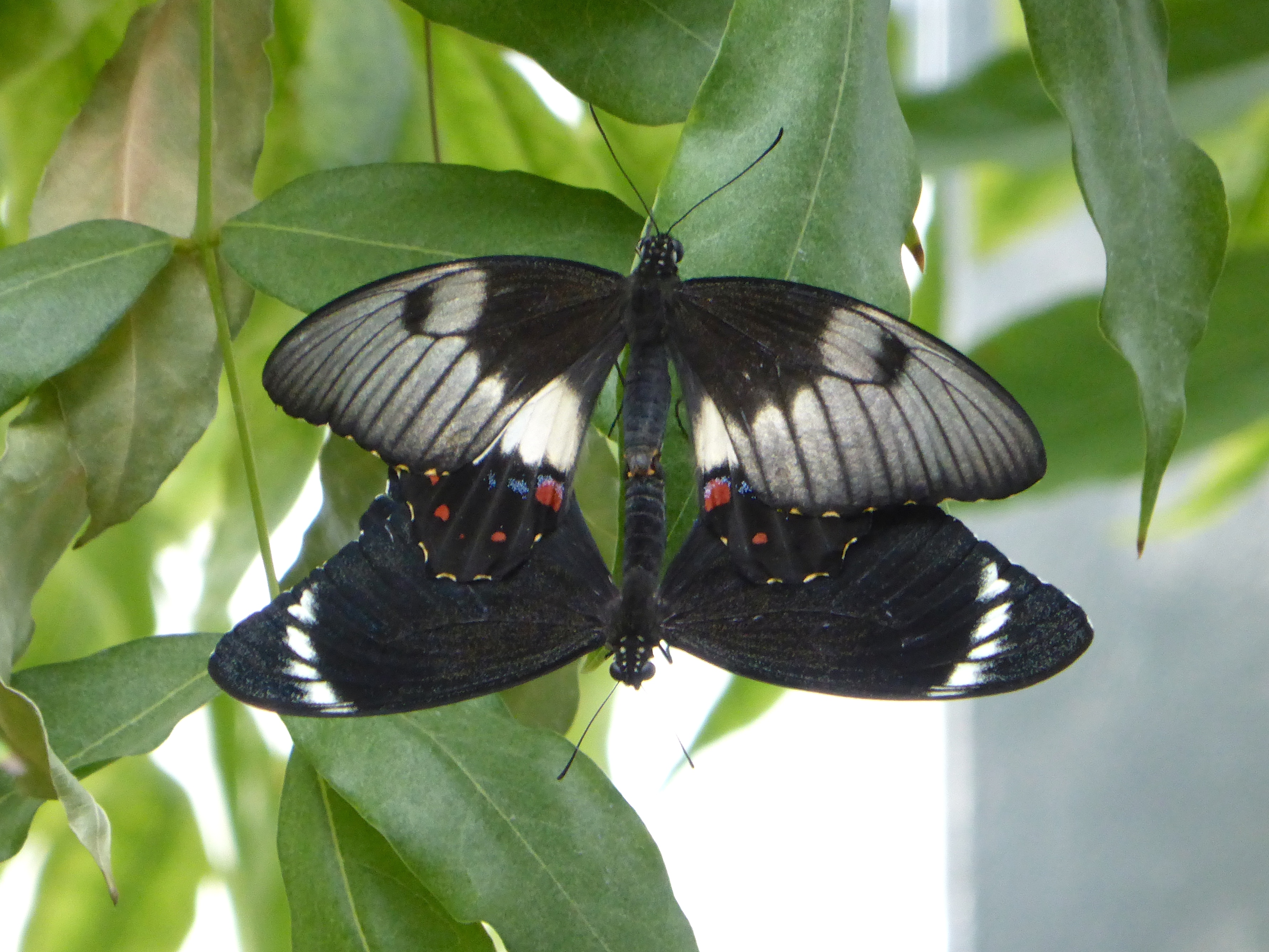
Copulating P. a. aegeus in Melbourne Zoo - female above, male below

== Larval food plants ==
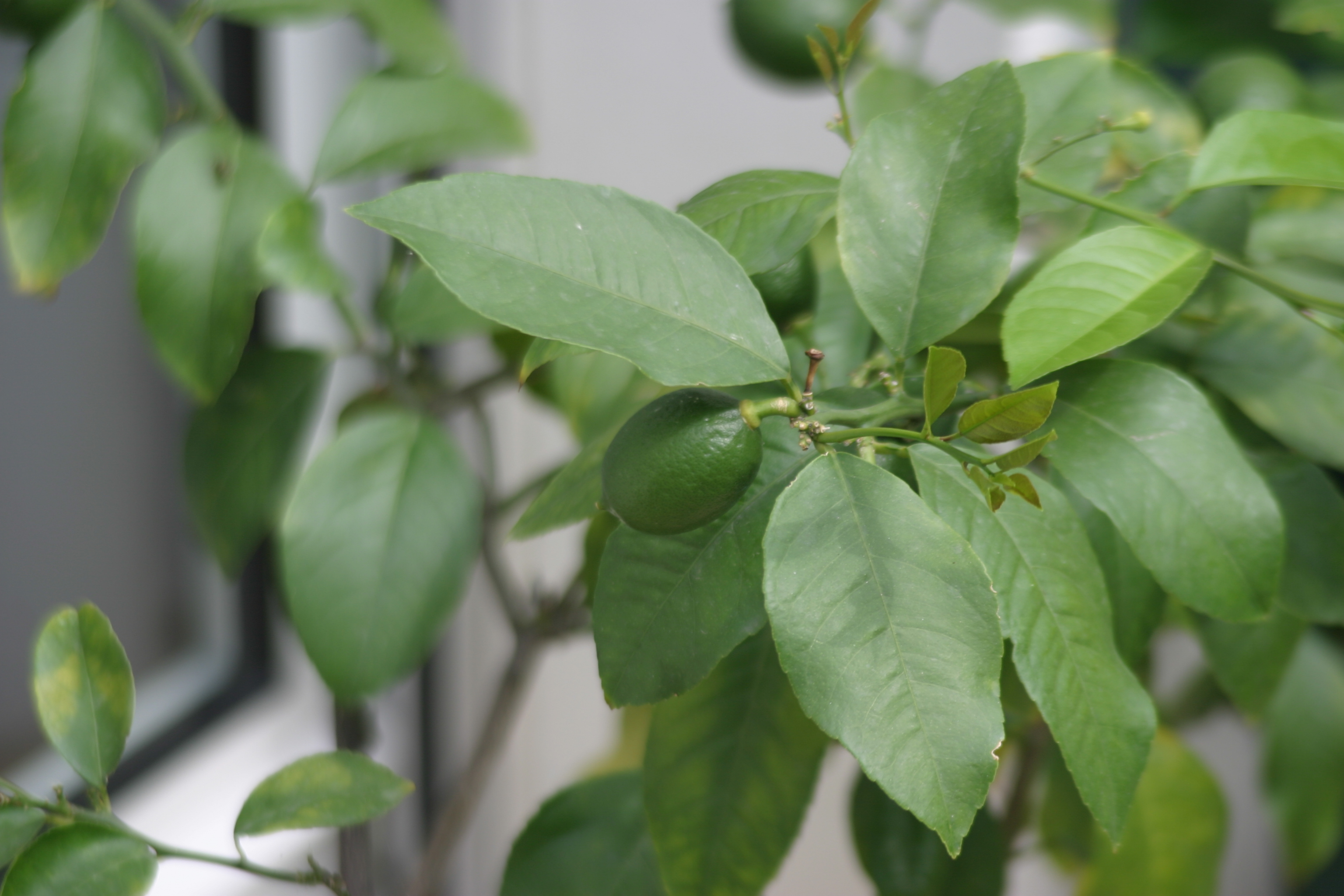
The larvae often feed on lemon leaves.

=== Native ===
The larvae are known to naturally use species the following Australian-native taxa as food plants: Boronia, Citrus, Clausena, Dinosperma, Eriostemon, Flindersia, Geijera, Halfordia, Leionema, Micromelum, Philotheca, Zanthoxylum and Zieria

=== Introduced ===
In addition, larvae have also been recorded using introduced species of the following taxa as food plants: Choisya, Citrus, Murraya, Poncirus and Zanthoxylum

Caterpillars also accept leaves from Parsley and Cryptocarya glauscens however female butterflies do not appear to lay eggs on these plants.

== Taxonomy ==
Papilio aegeus is the nominal member of the aegeus species group. The clade members are:

- Papilio aegeus Donovan, 1805
- Papilio bridgei Mathew, 1886
  - ? Papilio erskinei Mathew, 1886
- Papilio gambrisius Cramer, [1777]
- Papilio inopinatus Butler, 1883
- Papilio ptolychus Godman & Salvin, 1888
- Papilio tydeus C. & R. Felder, 1860
- Papilio weymeri Niepelt, 1914
- Papilio woodfordi Godman & Salvin, 1888
