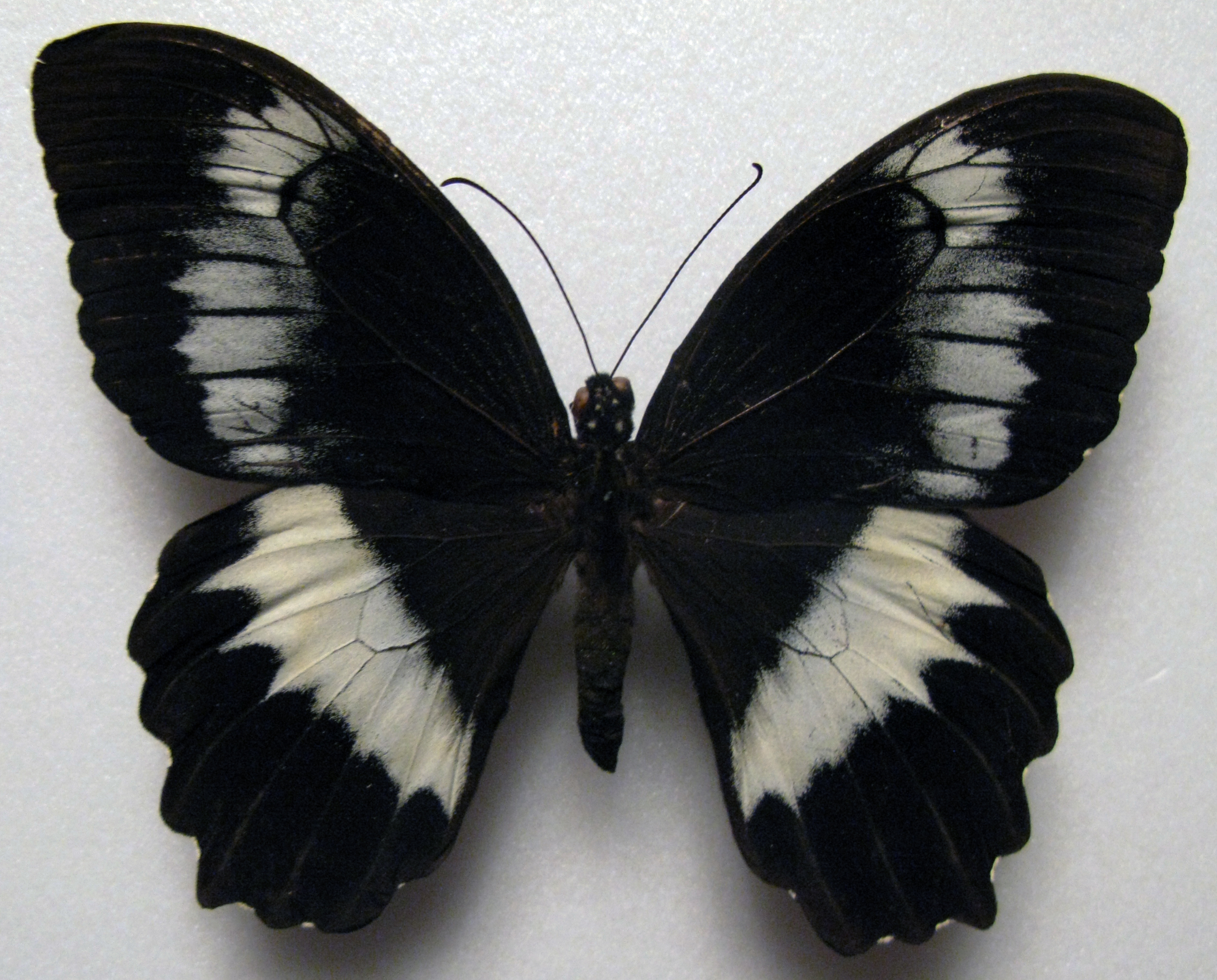

Scientific classification
- Kingdom: Animalia
- Phylum: Arthropoda
- Clade: Pancrustacea
- Class: Insecta
- Order: Lepidoptera
- Family: Papilionidae
- Genus: Papilio
- Species: P. woodfordi

Binomial name
- Papilio woodfordi Godman & Salvin, 1888

Synonyms
- Menelaides woodfordi; Papilio ariel Grose-Smith, 1889; Papilio laarchus Godman & Salvin, 1888

= Papilio woodfordi =

Species of butterfly

Papilio woodfordi, the Woodford's swallowtail, is a swallowtail butterfly of the Papilioninae subfamily. It is found on various islands in the Pacific Ocean (see Subspecies section).

== Description ==
The wingspan is 100–110 millimetres (3.9–4.3 in).Sexes similar, the female somewhat paler. Forewing above with complete broad white discal band or only with white spots between cell and apex. On the upper surface of the hindwing a white discal band which extends from the costal to the abdominal margin and is almost straight proximally, the 1.- patch of the band always smaller than the 2., commonly much shorter than the 7.; the marginal tooth of the 3.radial distinctly projecting. On the under surface of the forewing a subapical band, which is commonly reduced to some faint spots. The hindwing beneath with submarginal spots, of which above mostly only the anal spot (sometimes also a second one) is developed; on the disc blue spots and proximally to these frequently a grey macular band. Northern Solomon Islands. The larva on Citrus; green, the underside with the exception of the thorax grey-green, on the raised 4. segment a black belt, which laterally is produced into a point anteriorly; on the pronotum and the 11. segment a pair of pale spines. — woodfordi Godm. & Salv. (23 b). Forewing with a band running from the costal to the hindmargin, which is more or less interrupted below the 2. radial. with yellowish bands are ab. ochracea Ribbe. Bougainville and Shortland Islands (Alu, Fauro). — choiseuli Rothsch. (24 b). The band of the forewing only developed in the anterior part, which is placed close to the apex of the cell. Choiseul. — ariel Gr.-Sm. Forewing in the male with 2—-4, in the female with 3—5 spots, which are separated from the cell, posteriorly on the disc commonly traces of white spots; the band of the hindwing narrower than in the two preceding forms. Isabel. — laarchus Godm. & Salv. (23 b). Forewing with an oblique subapical band remote from the cell, terminating before the 2. radial half-way between cell and distal margin and appearing again before the hindmargin in theform of diffuse spots. The band of the hindwing almost twice as broad as in ariel. Rubiana Group: New Georgia, Kulambangra, Vella Lavella, Guizo, Rendova; common. The butterfly has a swift flight like all the allied species; it occurs principally in the open forest with much undergrowth, but also flies in the thick primeval forest.Karl Jordan in Seitz.

== Subspecies ==
- Papilio woodfordi woodfordi (Bougainville, Shortland Islands)
- Papilio woodfordi choiseuli Rothschild (Choiseul)
- Papilio woodfordi laarchus Godman & Salvin, 1888 (New Georgia Group)
- Papilio woodfordi ariel Grose-Smith, 1889 (Santa Isabel)

== Taxonomy ==
Papilio woodfordi is a member of the aegeus species group. The clade members are:

- Papilio aegeus Donovan, 1805
- Papilio bridgei Mathew, 1886
  - ? Papilio erskinei Mathew, 1886
- Papilio gambrisius Cramer, [1777]
- Papilio inopinatus Butler, 1883
- Papilio ptolychus Godman & Salvin, 1888
- Papilio tydeus C. & R. Felder, 1860
- Papilio weymeri Niepelt, 1914
- Papilio woodfordi Godman & Salvin, 1888

== Biology ==
The larvae feed on Citrus species.
