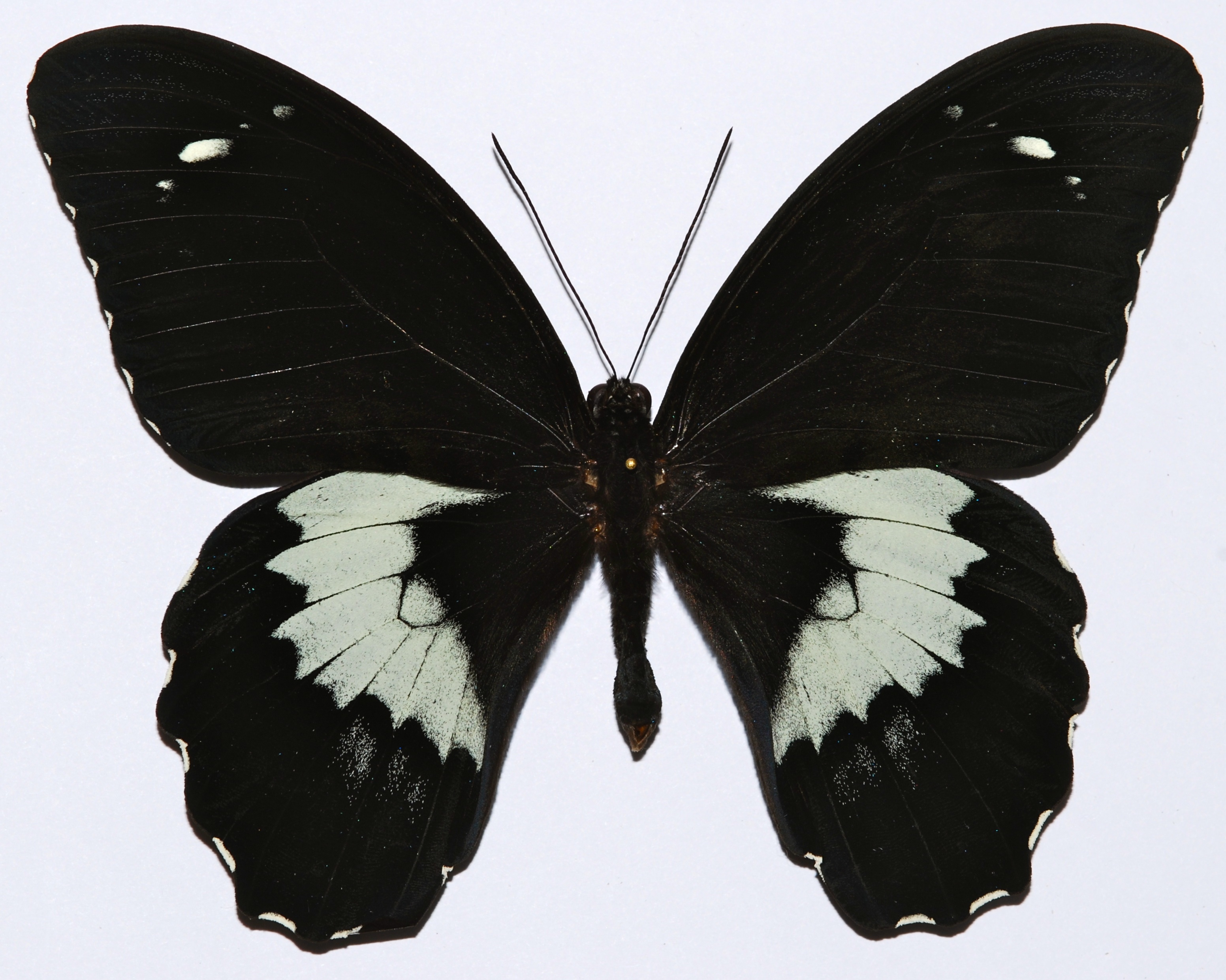

Scientific classification
- Kingdom: Animalia
- Phylum: Arthropoda
- Clade: Pancrustacea
- Class: Insecta
- Order: Lepidoptera
- Family: Papilionidae
- Genus: Papilio
- Species: P. gambrisius

Binomial name
- Papilio gambrisius Cramer, [1777]

Synonyms
- Papilio amphitrion Cramer, [1775]; Papilio drusius Cramer, [1779]; Papilio drimachus Godart, 1819; Papilio gambrisius ab. abbreviatus Rothschild, 1895

= Papilio gambrisius =

Species of butterfly

Papilio gambrisius is a species of swallowtail butterfly from the genus Papilio that is found in Serang, Moluccas, Ambon Island, Seram and Buru.

== Description ==
In Seitz (who also lists the forma) it is described "Perhaps not specifically different from P. aegeus. Palpi less white. Male: forewing with 4 subapical spots, the 1. and 2. small, sometimes absent, these spots beneath mostly much smaller than above. The band of the hindwing as in P. aegeus anteriorly widened basad, at the distal side of the 5. and 6. patches more or less strongly developed grey nebulous spots, the 5. patch at most half (usually only 1/3) as long as its distance from the distal margin; beneath the hindwing bears a row of blue discal patches and proximally to them grey spots. Female: monomorphic: forewing with large cell-patch and long discal patches. Hindwing with yellowish white, posteriorly ochre-yellow median band, which always reaches the costal and is broader posteriorly than between the costal and the cell; distally to the band large blue spots. The earlier stages not known, probably very similar to those of P. aegeus. A butterfly of the open woods with a profusion of undergrowth, among which it flies about with great rapidity; it drinks at puddles and the edges of brooks. Southern Moluccas.Karl Jordan in Seitz.

== Subspecies ==
- Papilio gambrisius gambrisius (Serang, Ambon)
- Papilio gambrisius colossus Fruhstorfer, 1899 (Ceram)
- Papilio gambrisius buruanus Rothschild, 1897 (Buru)

== Taxonomy ==
Papilio gambrisius is a member of the aegeus species-group. The clade members are

- Papilio aegeus Donovan, 1805
- Papilio bridgei Mathew, 1886
  - ? Papilio erskinei Mathew, 1886
- Papilio gambrisius Cramer, [1777]
- Papilio inopinatus Butler, 1883
- Papilio ptolychus Godman & Salvin, 1888
- Papilio tydeus C. & R. Felder, 1860
- Papilio weymeri Niepelt, 1914
- Papilio woodfordi Godman & Salvin, 1888
