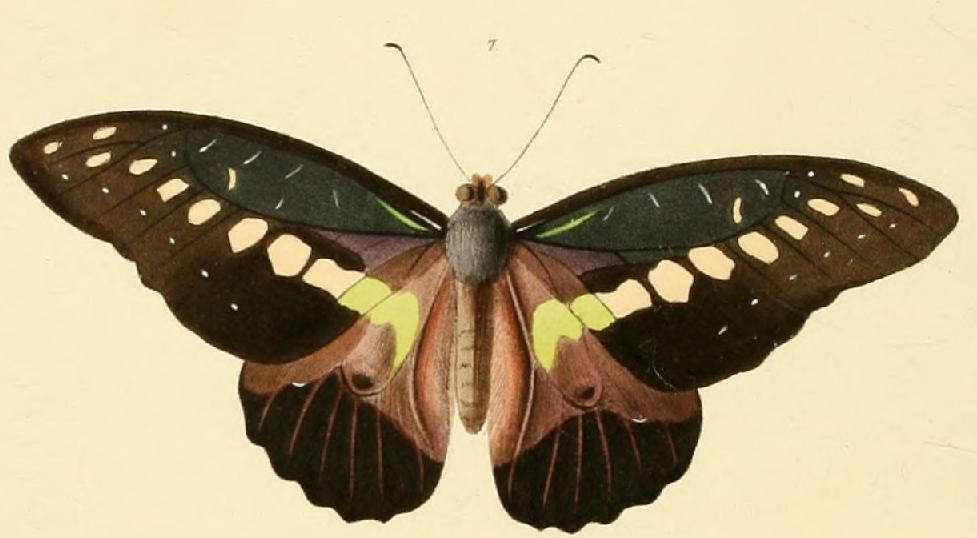

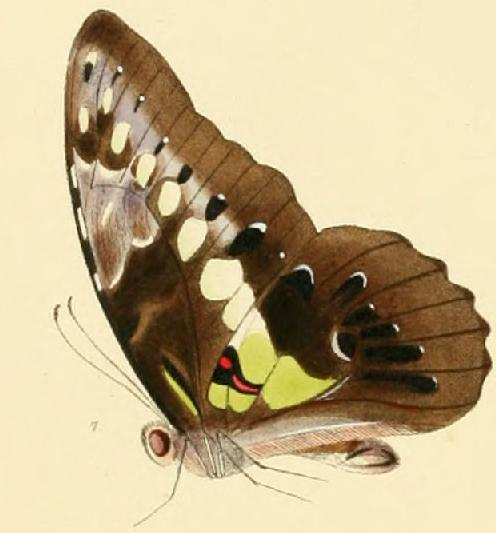

Scientific classification
- Kingdom: Animalia
- Phylum: Arthropoda
- Clade: Pancrustacea
- Class: Insecta
- Order: Lepidoptera
- Family: Papilionidae
- Genus: Graphium
- Species: G. wallacei

Binomial name
- Graphium wallacei (Hewitson, 1858)

Synonyms
- Papilio wallacei Hewitson, 1858; Papilio wallacei rubrosignatus Rothschild, 1895

= Graphium wallacei =

Species of butterfly

Graphium wallacei is a butterfly found in New Guinea and the Moluccas that belongs to the swallowtail family.

== Subspecies ==
- G. w. wallacei (Aru Islands, western Irian, New Guinea)
- G. w. rubrosignatus (Rothschild, 1895) (Halmahera, Bachan, Obi Islands)

== Taxonomy ==
Graphium wallacei belongs to the wallacei species group. This clade has four members:

- Graphium wallacei (Hewitson, 1858)
- Graphium hicetaon (Mathew, 1886)
- Graphium browni (Godman & Salvin, 1879)
- Graphium sandawanum Yamamoto, 1977
