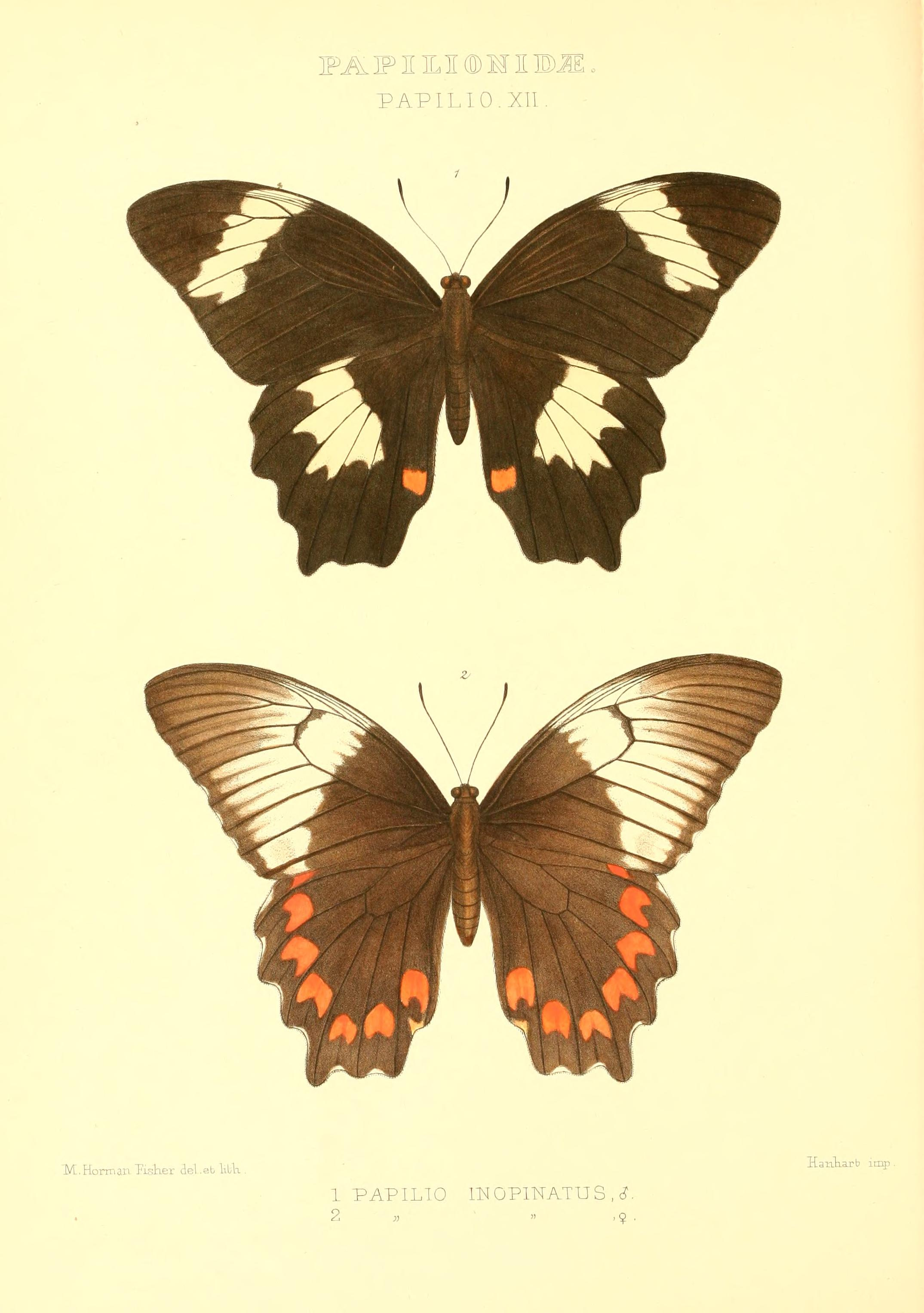
- Papilio inopinatus male and female

Scientific classification
- Kingdom: Animalia
- Phylum: Arthropoda
- Clade: Pancrustacea
- Class: Insecta
- Order: Lepidoptera
- Family: Papilionidae
- Genus: Papilio
- Species: P. inopinatus

Binomial name
- Papilio inopinatus Butler, 1883

Synonyms
- Papilio inopinatus kosmos Fruhstorfer, 1904; Papilio inopinatus inauris Fruhstorfer, 1904

= Papilio inopinatus =

Species of butterfly

Papilio inopinatus is a species of swallowtail butterfly from the genus Papilio that is found in Romang, Babar, Damar and Tanimbar.

== Description ==
The original description in Butler, 1883; Proc. zool. Soc. Lond. 1883 : 370, reads Allied to P. adrastus of Felder, from Ceram and New Guinea; but the male with a broad oblique subapical white belt, which does not quite reach the outer margin and is cut by the black nervures; the fascia on the secondaries narrower, formed more nearly as in the Australian P. aegeus, with zigzag outer edge, but of more uniform width throughout than in that species, and of a sordid cream-colour; a scarlet spot near the anal angle, well separated from the central fascia. The female differs in the whiter and oblique belt across the primaries, the inner edge of which is not so deeply zigzag, and therefore is not augulated as in the allied species, and the outer half toward apex suffused with grey so as greatly to reduce its width; secondaries with no trace of the central white patch, the submarginal scarlet spot large, oblong, and notched in front. Expanse of wings, Male 144 millimetres (5.7 in), female 153 millimetres (6.0 in).

Male var. "Wings shorter; the inner edge of the white band of primaries impinged upon by the discoidal cell, which also encloses a spot of the same colour as the band; the band of the secondaries broader, cutting across the end of the cell. Expanse of wings 132 mm. See also Karl Jordan in Seitz.

== Taxonomy ==
Papilio inopinatus is a member of the aegeus species-group. The clade members are

- Papilio aegeus Donovan, 1805
- Papilio bridgei Mathew, 1886
  - ? Papilio erskinei Mathew, 1886
- Papilio gambrisius Cramer, [1777]
- Papilio inopinatus Butler, 1883
- Papilio ptolychus Godman & Salvin, 1888
- Papilio tydeus C. & R. Felder, 1860
- Papilio weymeri Niepelt, 1914
- Papilio woodfordi Godman & Salvin, 1888
