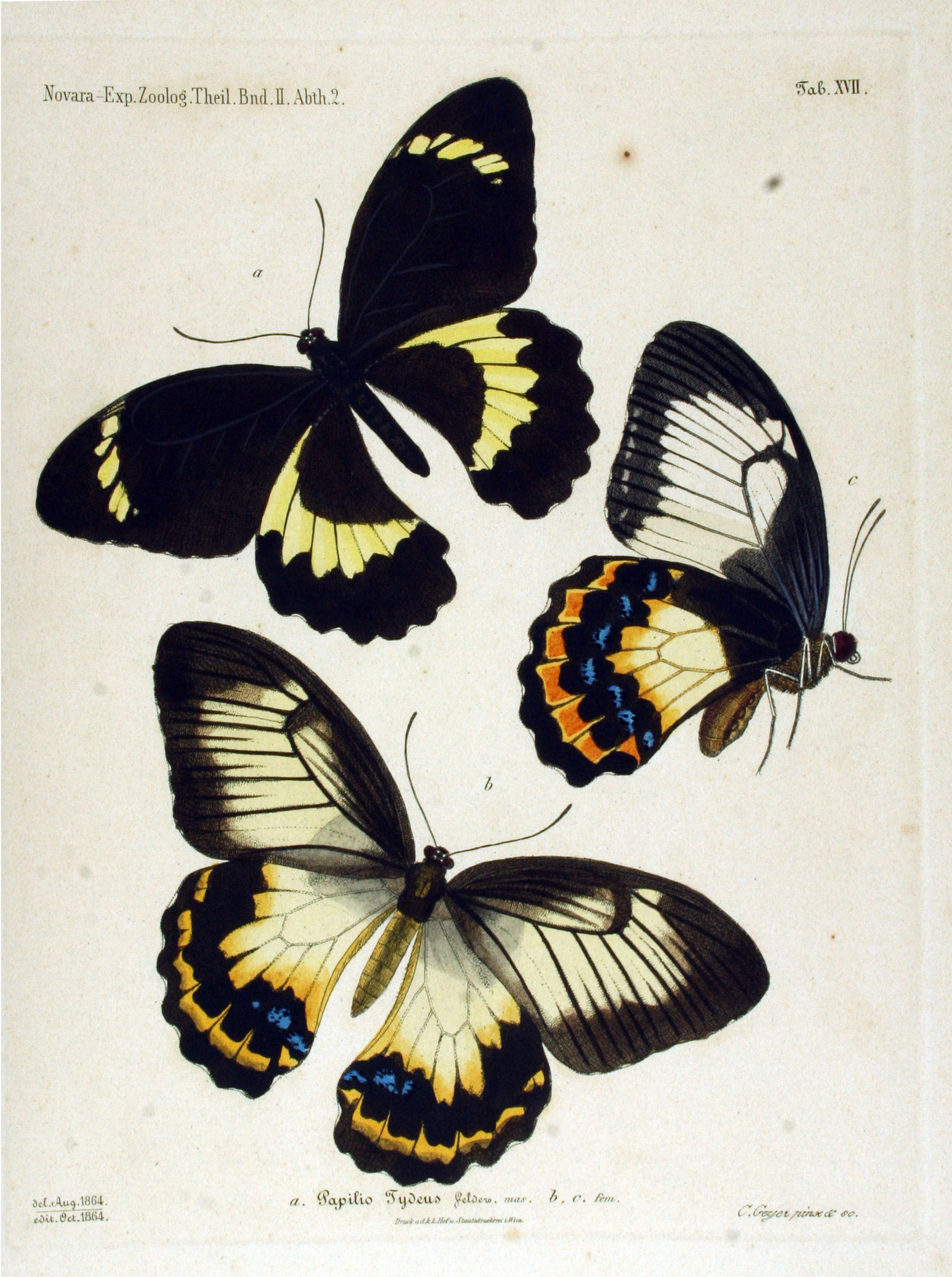
- The Felder plate accompanying the original description

Scientific classification
- Kingdom: Animalia
- Phylum: Arthropoda
- Clade: Pancrustacea
- Class: Insecta
- Order: Lepidoptera
- Family: Papilionidae
- Genus: Papilio
- Species: P. tydeus

Binomial name
- Papilio tydeus C. & R. Felder, 1860

= Papilio tydeus =

Species of butterfly

Papilio tydeus is a species of swallowtail butterfly from the genus Papilio that is found in the Moluccas (Batchian and Gilolo).

== Description ==
Differentiated from all the forms of P. aegeus by the large ochre-yellow submarginal spots of the hindwing, which are distally truncate or emarginate and proximally are produced along the veins into bracket-like projections. Male always with subapical oblique band of white spots; the band of the hindwing narrow, not touching the cell, the 1. patch prolonged almost to the base. The female appears only in the tenarides-form: forewing lighter in the centre; hindwing from the base to the disc yellowish white, at the proximal side of a broad discal band of large, black, connected patches ochre-yellow; the base of the costal margin beneath broadly black. Only on the Northern Moluccas. —tydeus Fldr. flies on Morty, Halmaheira, Ternate and Batjan. Male: the spot placed behind the subcostal fork on the forewing shorter than its distance from the cell. the cell-spot of the forewing beneath reaches the base of the lower median; at the innerside of the 1. black discal spot of the hindwing beneath is placed a thin, often very diffuse, yellowish transverse spot. — obiensis Rothsch., from Obi. Male: the subapical band of the forewing broader than in tydeus, the 4. spot longer than its distance from the cell. both wings more extended light; the cell spot of the forewing beneath extends to beyond the base of the 2. median; the transverse spot placed at the innerside of the 1. black discal spot of the hindwing beneath is produced basad along the subcostal.Karl Jordan in Seitz.

== Status ==
Common and not threatened.

== Subspecies ==
- Papilio tydeus tydeus (Bachan, Ternate, Halmahera, Morotai)
- Papilio tydeus obiensis Rothschild, 1898 (Obi)

== Taxonomy ==
Papilio tydeus is a member of the aegeus species-group. The clade members are

- Papilio aegeus Donovan, 1805
- Papilio bridgei Mathew, 1886
  - ? Papilio erskinei Mathew, 1886
- Papilio gambrisius Cramer, [1777]
- Papilio inopinatus Butler, 1883
- Papilio ptolychus Godman & Salvin, 1888
- Papilio tydeus C. & R. Felder, 1860
- Papilio weymeri Niepelt, 1914
- Papilio woodfordi Godman & Salvin, 1888

== See also ==
- Wallacea
