= Graphium sandawanum =

Apo swallowtail

Conservation status
- Endangered (IUCN 2.3)

Scientific classification
- Kingdom: Animalia
- Phylum: Arthropoda
- Clade: Pancrustacea
- Class: Insecta
- Order: Lepidoptera
- Family: Papilionidae
- Genus: Graphium
- Species: G. sandawanum

Binomial name
- Graphium sandawanum Yamamoto, 1977

Species of butterfly

Graphium sandawanum, the Apo swallowtail, is a species of butterfly in the family Papilionidae. It is endemic to the Philippines.

== Taxonomy ==
Graphium sandawanum belongs to the wallacei species group. This clade has four members:

- Graphium wallacei (Hewitson, 1858)
- Graphium hicetaon (Mathew, 1886)
- Graphium browni (Godman & Salvin, 1879)
- Graphium sandawanum Yamamoto, 1977

== Sources ==
- Page M. G.P & Treadaway, C. G. 2003 Schmetterlinge der Erde, Butterflies of the World Part XVII (17), Papilionidae IX Papilionidae of the Philippine Islands. Edited by Erich Bauer and Thomas Frankenbach Keltern: Goecke & Evers; Canterbury: Hillside Books. ISBN 978-3-931374-45-7
