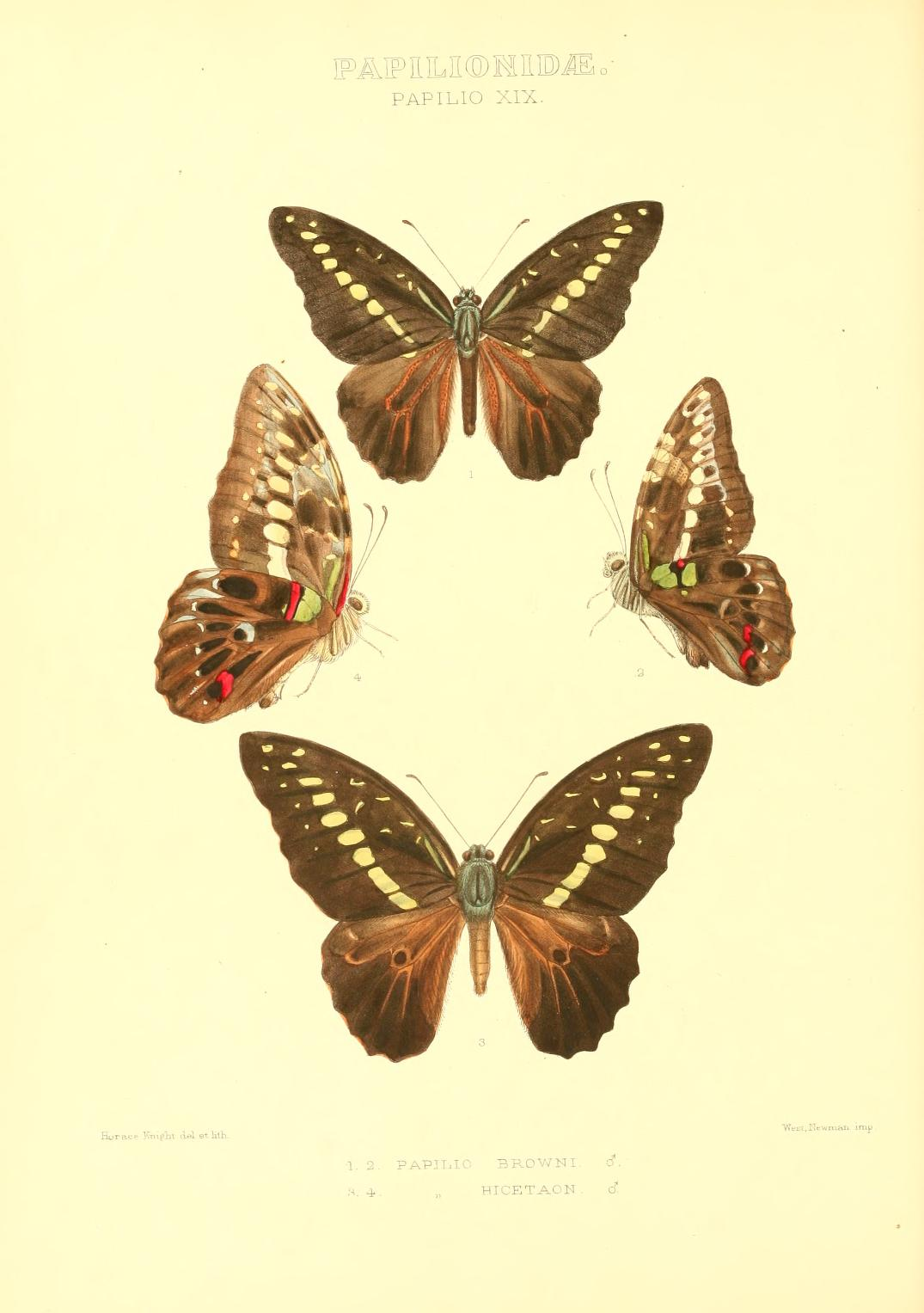
- Figures 1 and 2

Scientific classification
- Kingdom: Animalia
- Phylum: Arthropoda
- Clade: Pancrustacea
- Class: Insecta
- Order: Lepidoptera
- Family: Papilionidae
- Genus: Graphium
- Species: G. browni

Binomial name
- Graphium browni (Godman & Salvin, 1879)

Synonyms
- Papilio browni Godman & Salvin, 1879

= Graphium browni =

Species of butterfly

Graphium browni is a butterfly found in Oceania - New Britain, Duke of York Islands, New Hanover Island and St Matthias Islands - that belongs to the swallowtail family.

== Description ==
The discal band of the hindwing narrow and linear before the hind margin, the green costal patch on the under surface of the hindwing divided in the middle, with red spot before the costal vein, the part of the green patch placed in the cell is very small or entirely absent, two red spots between the apex of the cell and abdominal margin In the woods, where the butterflies fly round the tops of trees.

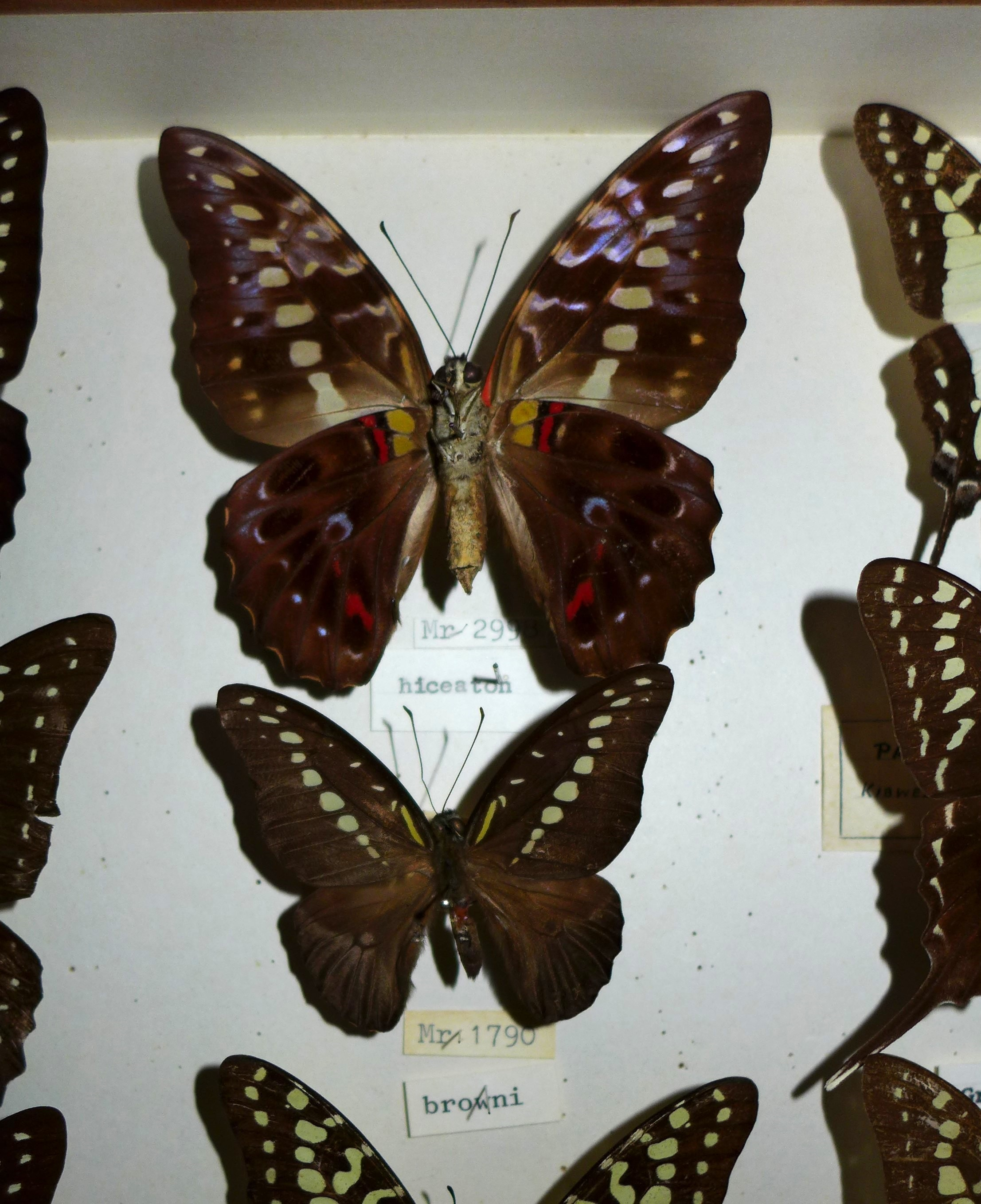

The larva feeds on Annona mercuriana.

== Taxonomy ==
Graphium browni belongs to the wallacei species group. This clade has four members:

- Graphium wallacei (Hewitson, 1858)
- Graphium hicetaon (Mathew, 1886)
- Graphium browni (Godman & Salvin, 1879)
- Graphium sandawanum Yamamoto, 1977
