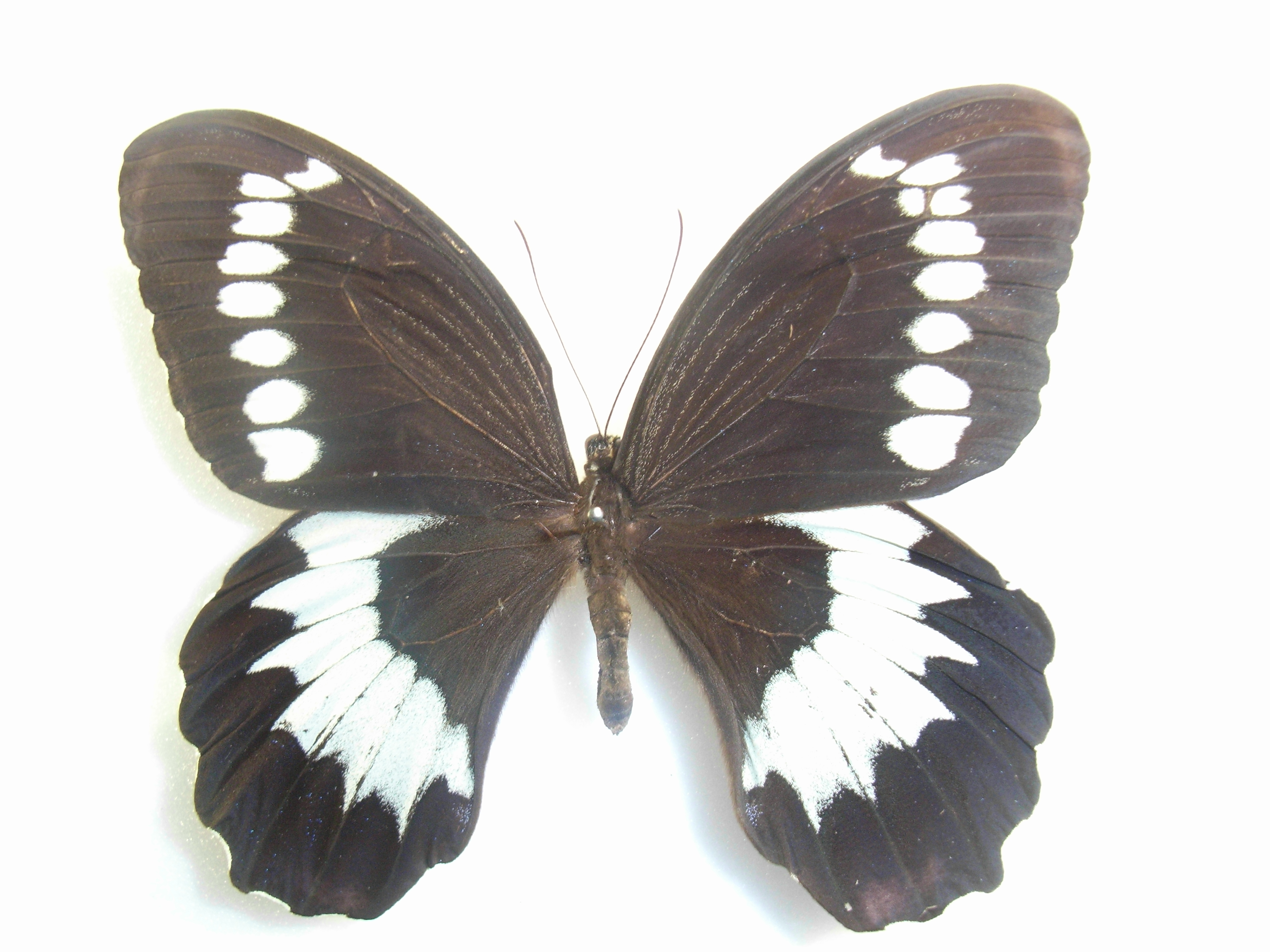

Conservation status
- Least Concern (IUCN 3.1)

Scientific classification
- Kingdom: Animalia
- Phylum: Arthropoda
- Clade: Pancrustacea
- Class: Insecta
- Order: Lepidoptera
- Family: Papilionidae
- Genus: Papilio
- Species: P. weymeri

Binomial name
- Papilio weymeri Niepelt, 1914

= Papilio weymeri =

Species of butterfly

Papilio weymeri is a species of swallowtail butterfly in the Papilioninae subfamily that is endemic to Papua New Guinea where it is found on Los Negros and Manus Islands.

== Description ==
The species' males are 70 millimetres (2.8 in) long and are black in colour while females are 75 millimetres (3.0 in) and are brownish-black coloured. Both sexes have cream fringe spots but only females have orange-red eyespot and dark coloured scales.

Technical description

In the male the wings are black on the obverse, the forewings bear a series of white postdiscal macules and the hindwings a large white macule whose shape varies depending on the individual. On the reverse the wings are dark brown, the forewings bear a series of white postdiscal macules, the hindwings bear a row of white macules, a few blue lunulae and an orange eyespot in the anal angle.

In the female the wings are dark brown on the obverse, the forewings have a lighter, rather fuzzy band and submarginal yellow macules. The hindwings bear yellow submarginal lunules, large iridescent blue postdiscal macules and an orange eyespot in the anal angle. The reverse is similar but the blue macules are less large and there is an orange macule on the upper edge of the wing

== Taxonomy ==
Papilio weymeri is a member of the aegeus species group. The clade members are

- Papilio aegeus Donovan, 1805
- Papilio bridgei Mathew, 1886
  - ? Papilio erskinei Mathew, 1886
- Papilio gambrisius Cramer, [1777]
- Papilio inopinatus Butler, 1883
- Papilio ptolychus Godman & Salvin, 1888
- Papilio tydeus C. & R. Felder, 1860
- Papilio weymeri Niepelt, 1914
- Papilio woodfordi Godman & Salvin, 1888
