= Gervase Frederick Mathew =

British naval officer and entomologist (1842–1928)

Gervase Frederick Mathew (11 February 1842 – 10 February 1928) was an English naval officer and entomologist.

Gervase Mathew was born in Barnstaple and educated at Barnstaple Grammar School and Blundell's School. He entered the Royal Navy as an assistant clerk on 12 December 1860, was promoted to assistant paymaster on 15 February 1865, then to paymaster on 9 February 1879, and retired as paymaster-in-chief on 11 February 1902. One of his early appointments was to the Warrior, the first British ironclad.

He was based in the Mediterranean, then at Sydney, and in Fiji and travelled extensively in the central Pacific. He introduced Edward Meyrick to the fauna of the central Pacific islands. Gervase Mathew was a fellow of the Entomological Society of London the Zoological Society of London and the Linnean Society.

His collection and types were sold to Godman and are now in the collection of the Natural History Museum, London.

His works include:

- "List of Lepidoptera forwarded to Edward Newman". Entomologist. 7 (127): 62-66 (1874).
- "Life history of Papilio archidamas". Entomologist's Monthly Magazine. 14 (163): 152-153 (1877).
- "List of Lepidoptera observed in the neighbourhood of Gallipoli Turkey, in 1878". Entomologist's Monthly Magazine. 18: 10-13, 29-32, 92- (1881).
- "Life history of Callidryas drya, Boisd. Entomologist's Monthly Magazine. 18 (214): 219-220 (1882).
- "Remarks on some Central American species of Pyrrhopyge, Hubn". Entomologist's Monthly Magazine. 19 (217): 18-19 (1882).
- "An afternoon among the butterflies of Thursday Island". Entomologist. 19: 33-36, 84-97 9 (1885).
- Life history of three species of Western Pacific Rhopalocera.Trans.Ent. Soc. Lond. 1885: 357-67, pl. X. (1885)
- Descriptions of some new species of Rhopalocera from the Solomon Islands. Proc. zool. Soc. Lond. 1886(3): 343-350, illustrations.
- Life-histories of Rhopalocera from the Australian region, Trans. Ent. Soc. Lond. (1888), pp. 137–188 (1888)
- Notes on the Lepidoptera from the Mediterranean Entomologist, 31: 77-84, 108-116,. 141 (1898)
- Descriptions and life-histories of new species of Rhopalocera from the Western Pacific Trans. ent. Soc. Lond. 37(2): 311-315 (1889)
- Butterflies attracted by human perspiration Entomologist 55(708):112-113 (1922)
