= Lorquin Entomological Society =

The Lorquin Entomological Society is a century-old association of professional and amateur entomologists, biologists and naturalists that meet regularly to study and promote entomology and natural history, especially about wildlife in and near Southern California.

== History ==
The Lorquin Natural History Club was started in June 1913 by Fordyce Grinnell Jr. A constitution committee was formed in July, and a constitution adopted at the August meeting. It was named after French entomologist Pierre Joseph Michel Lorquin, who collected specimens in California during the California Gold Rush. Early members included not only entomologists like Grinnell, but herpetologists, botanists, an ornithologist, a conchologist, a geologist, and seismologist Charles F. Richter, whose specialty at the time was astronomy. Monthly meetings were held in private homes.

The group was renamed the Lorquin Entomological Club in 1917 and its meetings moved to the Los Angeles Public Library. In 1919 the club began meeting in the Southwest Museum in Highland Park. Early club activities included field trips into the hills and canyons beyond the termini of the Red Cars of the Pacific Electric and the Yellow Cars of the Los Angeles Railway. It was an era when a butterfly collector could net over 500 in a single day and take over 100 species in the Los Angeles area. The club held their first Butterfly Show February 24–26, 1921, at the Southwest Museum. Among other things it featured a lecture on butterfly hunting, illustrated by stereopticon slides, by museum director John Adams Comstock.

The Butterfly Show became an annual, month-long event, sponsored by the Museum of History, Science, and Art. In 1926, the Southwest Museum narrowed its scope. Natural history exhibits and specimens were transferred to the Museum of History, Science, and Art. In January 1927, the club moved its meetings there as well, and changed its name to the Lorquin Entomological Society. Comstock, who had been director of the Southwest Museum from 1921 to 1926, published his landmark Butterflies of California in 1927. Early in 1928 he became Acting Director of the Museum of History, Science, and Art. He served several terms as president of the society. Under his influence, and that of his colleague Charles Montagu Dammers, the society's emphasis evolved from collecting to life history studies. Members in the late 1920s and early 1930s included biologists John Shrader Garth, Jeane Daniel Gunder, Lloyd M. Martin, and Don Meadows.

In 1929, the society decided that California should name a state insect. They prepared ballots listing three butterfly candidates and sent them to entomologists throughout the state. The nominees were the Lorquin's admiral (Limenitis lorquini), the California sister (Heterochroa californica), and the California dog head or Flying pansy (Zerene eurydice). The California dog head won handily, with 77 votes out of 88 cast. The state legislature took note, and the Bureau of Entomology in the California Department of Agriculture began to use a likeness of the California dog head, labeled "California State Insect" on its documents. No further action took place, however, until 1972, when Assemblyman Kenneth L. Maddy introduced Assembly Bill No. 1843 to make what was by then known as the California dogface the official state insect. Governor Ronald Reagan signed the bill into law on July 28, 1972, making California the first in the nation to have a state insect.

In 1986, Steven R. Kutcher, a member of the society, organized the first annual Insect Fair at the Los Angeles County Arboretum and Botanic Garden. It featured exhibits by the society and others, demonstrations, and lectures. When the fair outgrew the Arboretum, it was moved in 1989 to the Natural History Museum of Los Angeles County (the erstwhile Museum of History, Science, and Art). Eventually the Natural History Museum took over organizing the fair and has done so since. What is now known as Bug Fair, and bills itself as "the biggest bug festival in North America", draws 20,000 visitors to its interactive exhibits, vendor tables, and insect menus.

The society has counted as members many academics, authors, and museum curators in the field of entomology, such as brothers John F. and Thomas C. Emmel, Cristopher Henne, Charles L. Hogue and son James N. 'Jim' Hogue, Noel McFarland, and Rudolf H. T. Mattioni. Members are active in research, environmental protection, habitat restoration, species surveys, entomological outreach, and natural history education. As of 2013, membership stood at just over 100. Regular meetings with speakers are held on the fourth Friday of every month, at BioQuip (a biological supply house in Rancho Dominguez) since remodeling ousted the society from the Natural History Museum in 2009.

== Publications ==
The club published eighteen monthly issues of Lorquinia between August 1916 and January 1919. They contained botanical and entomological papers and notes. Since about 1955, it has published a newsletter (10 issues per year), most recently called NetWork. In 1999, it published a book by Robert Lee Allen, Stalking the wild arthropod: The Lorquin Entomological Society's guide to photographing arthropods.
