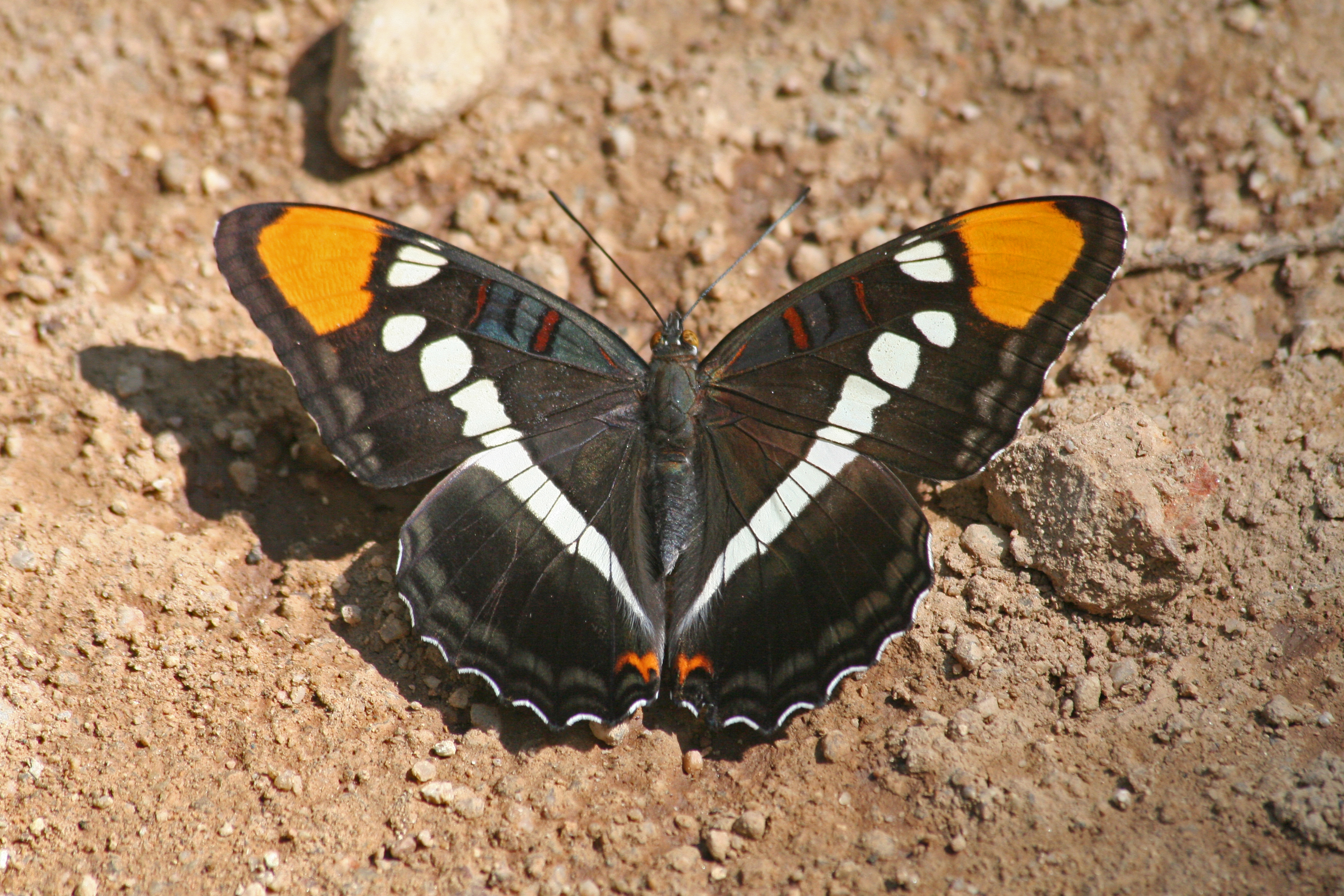
- In Fort Huachuca, Arizona
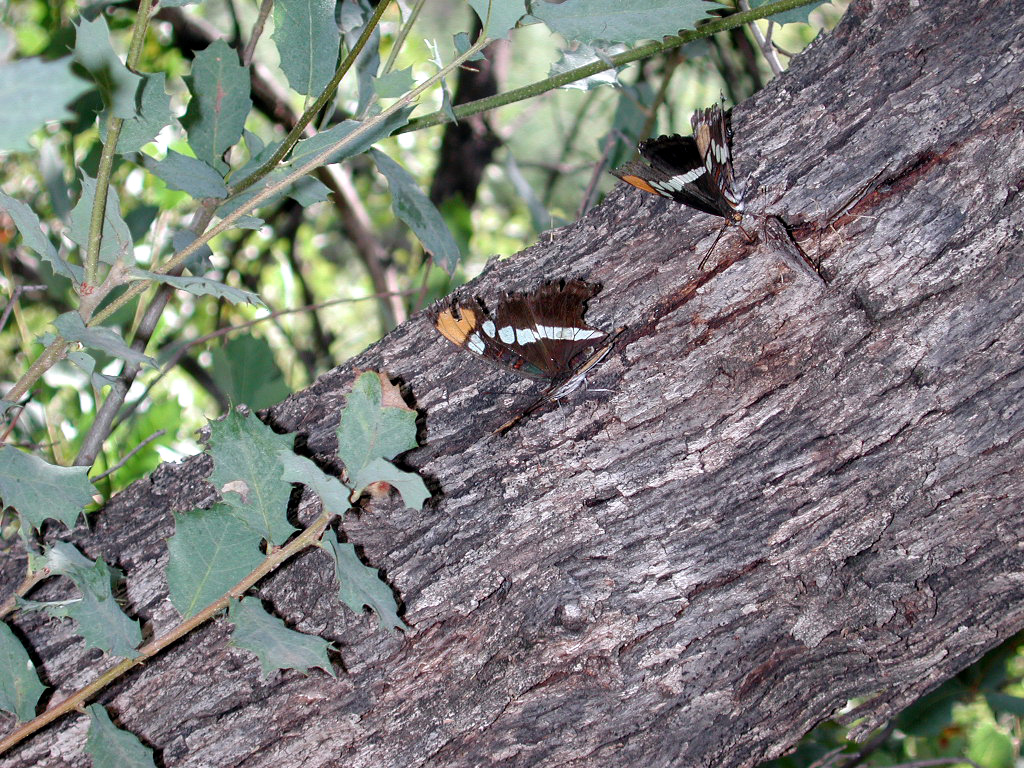
- Drinking sap from a wound in the trunk of the Quercus emoryii oak, which is also a host plant for the larval form of the butterfly

Scientific classification
- Kingdom: Animalia
- Phylum: Arthropoda
- Clade: Pancrustacea
- Class: Insecta
- Order: Lepidoptera
- Family: Nymphalidae
- Genus: Adelpha
- Species: A. eulalia

Binomial name
- Adelpha eulalia (Doubleday, [1848])

Synonyms
- Adelpha bredowii eulalia (Doubleday, [1848]); Limenitis eulalia Doubleday, [1848]; Limenitis bredowii guatemalensis Carpenter & Hobby, 1944

= Adelpha eulalia =

Arizona sister

Species of butterfly

Adelpha eulalia, the Arizona sister, is a species of butterfly in the family Nymphalidae. It occurs from at least Guatemala and Mexico to the southwestern United States, including southeastern California, Arizona, New Mexico, and southern Texas. They can also sometimes be found in Oklahoma, Kansas, Colorado, Utah, and Nevada.

Adelpha eulalia belongs to the serpa species group in the genus Adelpha (sisters). It was previously treated as a subspecies of Bredow's sister (Adelpha bredowii). Recent phylogenetic studies, however, conclude that morphological, geographical, and genetic evidence make it clear that it is a separate species.

== See also ==
- Adelpha californica, the California sister
