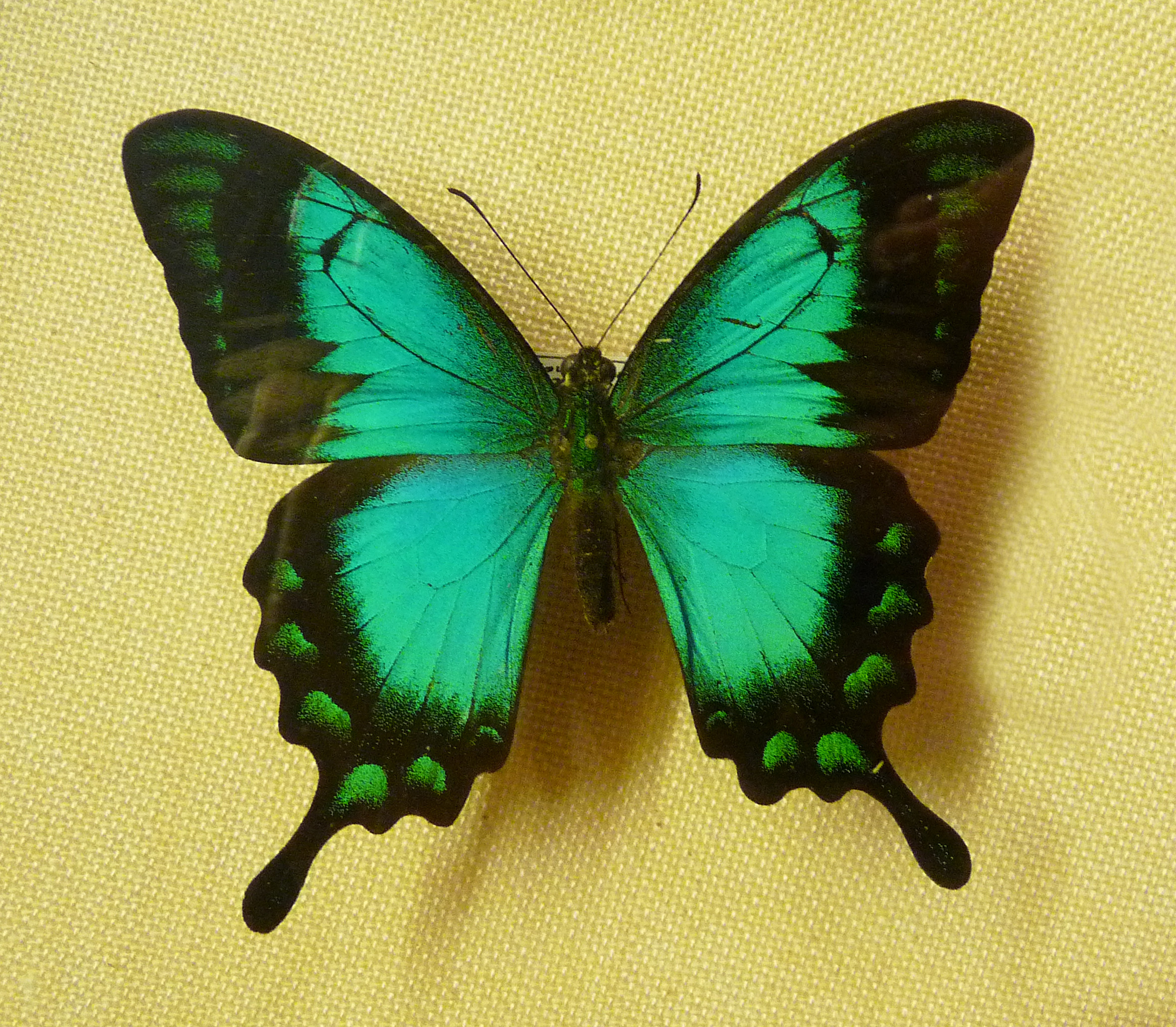

Scientific classification
- Domain: Eukaryota
- Kingdom: Animalia
- Phylum: Arthropoda
- Class: Insecta
- Order: Lepidoptera
- Family: Papilionidae
- Genus: Papilio
- Species: P. lorquinianus

Binomial name
- Papilio lorquinianus C. & R. Felder, 1865

Synonyms
- Papilio philippus Wallace, 1865; Papilio d'albertisi Oberthür, 1879

= Papilio lorquinianus =

Species of butterfly

Papilio lorquinianus, the sea green swallowtail, is a butterfly of the family Papilionidae. It is found in the Moluccas (Morotai, Ternate, Halmahera, Bacan and Seram) and in western Irian Jaya.

== Description ==
The imago has a wingspan of between 7 and 10 cm. On the obverse the forewings are iridescent blue-green with black margins sprinkled with green scales at the apex, the hindwings are of the same colour with black margins, six green lunulae in the marginal part and tails. On the reverse side the forewings are brown and are lighter in the marginal part, the hindwings are brown with a lighter marginal part, and bear six black and blue ocelli in the intravenous spaces. The body is brown and sprinkled with iridescent green scales on top. There is no sexual dimorphism.

Seitz- P. lorquinianus. Very nearly allied to P. peranthus male: the metallic area of the forewing much less straight distally than in P. peranthus, posteriorly broader, extending between the pilose stripes, forewing with blue or green submarginal band, hindwing from the subcostal with distinct submarginal spots of the same colour,the basal area of the hindwing always extends, beyond the apex of the cell. Under surface similar to that of P. peranthus. In the female the metallic area of the forewing is more uniformly rounded than in the male, also the sub¬ marginal spots of the hindwing above are larger and the under surface is paler. Earlier stages unknown. In the genitalia P. lorquinianus agress almost entirely with P. peranthus. As in the other Gloss-Papilios the metallic area assumes a deeper blue tone when the light falls obliquely from the front or side. Moluccas and Dutch New Guinea. — lorquinianus Fldr. (= philippus Wall, partim, ? apollodorus Fruhst.) (37 b). Greenish blue, the metallic area of the forewing does not quite reach the apex of the cell, but there are always a few metallic spots distally to the upper angle of the cell. Halmaheira, Ternate. — gelia subsp. nov. The black apical area of the cell of the forewing about twice as large as in the preceding form, the metallic area reaching at most to the 3. radial, also no metallic spots are placed at the distal side of the apex of the cell. Batjan. — philippus Wall. The metallic spots are more extended in both sexes than in lorquinianus and more greenish, the green submarginal macular band on the upperside of the forewing and the grey band on the underside are narrower. Ceram, very rare. From Obi, Burn and Amboina no form of lorquinianus is yet known. — albertisi Oberth. (37 a). Golden green, appearing blue when looked at sideways or from the front; the metallic area even larger than in philippus; the under surface very uniform dark brown, the light discal band of the forewing mostly only indicated. The pilose stripes are usually separated, except that the thin stripe of the submedian fold, if present, is always confluent with the lower median stripe. The female not known. Dutch New Guinea: Andai and Ivapaur. Karl Jordan in Seitz.

== Subspecies ==
Subspecies include:

- Papilio lorquinianus albertisi (Oberthür, 1880) (Kapaur, Andai, West Irian)
- Papilio lorquinianus esmeae (Parrott, 1985) (Morotai)
- Papilio lorquinianus gelia (Jordan, 1909) (Bachan)
- Papilio lorquinianus philippus (Wallace, 1865) (Serang)
- Papilio lorquinianus boanoensis (Kariya, 1992) (Boano)

== Taxonomy ==
Papilio lorquinianus is in a species group which includes

- Papilio lorquinianus C. Felder & R. Felder, 1865
- Papilio neumoegeni Honrath, 1890
- Papilio peranthus Fabricius, 1787
- Papilio pericles Wallace, 1865

== Etymology ==
The name honors Pierre Joseph Michel Lorquin, a French naturalist.
