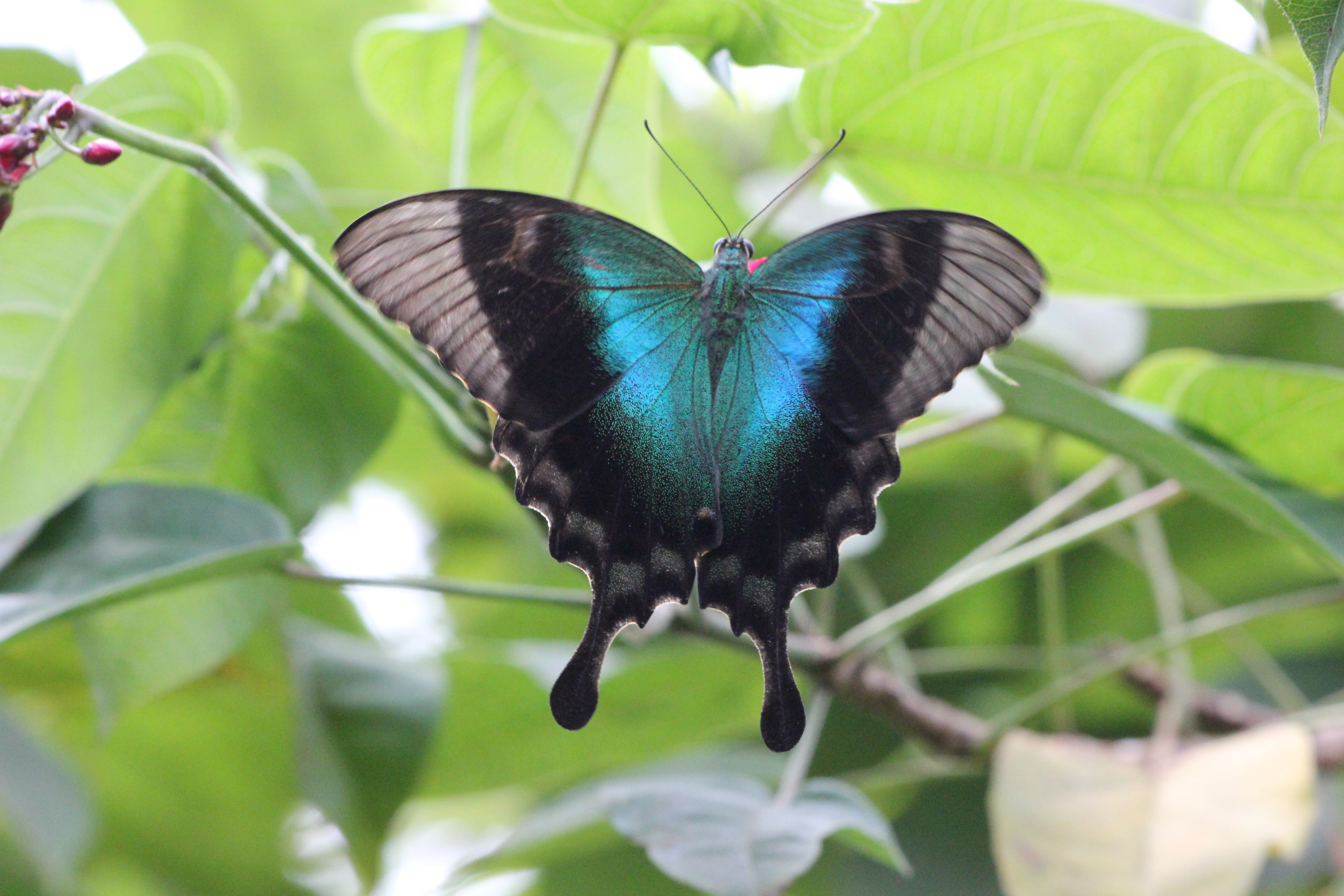

Scientific classification
- Kingdom: Animalia
- Phylum: Arthropoda
- Clade: Pancrustacea
- Class: Insecta
- Order: Lepidoptera
- Family: Papilionidae
- Genus: Papilio
- Species: P. peranthus

Binomial name
- Papilio peranthus Fabricius, 1787

Synonyms
- Princeps peranthus; Papilio adamantius C. & R. Felder, 1864; Papilio macedon Wallace, 1865

= Papilio peranthus =

Species of butterfly

Papilio peranthus, the Indonesian swallowtail is a butterfly of the family Papilionidae. It is found in Indonesia (including Java, Sulawesi and the Lesser Sunda Islands).

== Description ==
Papilio peranthus is a very large butterfly with a wingspan of 70 mm to 90 mm, with a scalloped outer edge to the wings and a large club-like tail on each hindwing. The upperside is black with a green distal portion and a green sheen on the body. The reverse is beige with a brown basal part and a line of chevrons on the hindwings between the beige part and the brown part.

Seitz- P. peranthus. About a third or the half of both wings bluish green, this metallic area never reaching beyond the apex of the cell of the forewing, before the distal margin of the forewing a green band, which is very broad anteriorly and strongly narrowed posteriorly. The pilose stripes of the male mostly confluent, never all completely separated, as at least the stripe placed on the submedian fold is united with the lower median. The female paler than the especially in the distal part of the under surface, the metallic area mostly somewhat darker blue. The peranthus. earlier stages are not known. In habits the butterfly resembles P. 'palinurus. —-peranthus F. (37a). male: the green submarginal band of the forewing anteriorly as broad as the black discal band or broader; the green basal area reaches to or nearly to the anterior angle of the cell. In the female the green scaling of the submarginal area of the forewing above is very sparse. The inner margin of the pale submarginal area of the forewing beneath is mostly placed basally to the subcostal fork. Java. — transiensFruhst. (= kinesias Fruhst., fannius Fruhst., phoebus Fruhst.). The green area somewhat less extended than in peranthus, hence the black discal band of the forewing broader; as in Javan specimens the green submarginal band of the male reaches only to the 1. median, rarely a green sub- marginal spot is indicated below this vein. The light distal band of the forewing beneath is placed distally to the fork of the subcostal. Bali to Alor; specimens are before me from Bali, Lombok, Sumbawa, Flores, Larentula, intermedius. Adonara, Pantar, Alor. —intermedius Snell. (= fulgens Rob.). The basal area somewhat more densely scaled and bluer than in transiens and peranthus; the submarginal band of the forewing in the female distinctly green to the submedian and in the male continued to the 2. median or even to the submedian; anteriorly this band is usually broader than in transiens. Bonerate, Djampea and Kalao. — baweana Hag. I [Jordan] have before me only the two females described by Hagen; in these the blue-green basal area only reaches to the anterior angle of the cell of the fore¬wing; the green submarginal band is much narrower anteriorly than the black discal band and its green scaling does not extend below 7 the lower median; the costal and anal spots of the hindwing beneath are large and pale yellow, and, in the only well preserved specimen, appear also on the upper surface; the very light inner margin of the pale distal area of the forewing beneath is placed outside the furcation of the subcostal and before the middle is still more distinctly curved basad than in females from Java. Bawean. —insulicola Rothsch. (37 b), from Saleyer, connects the preceding forms with adamantius, but most nearly approaches the latter. The costal margin of the forewing more curved and the distal margin more strongly emarginate than in the preceding forms. In the male the green-blue basal area reaches on the forewing not quite to the upper median and on the hindwing to the apex of the cell and in the female it is even somewhat more reduced, the pilose stripes broadly confluent, the green sub¬ marginal band narrower than the black discal band; the upper surface of the hindwing almost entirely without green submarginal spots, especially in the especially in the male. The grey discal band on the underside of the forewing is approximated to the cell, its inner margin crosses the stalk of the subcostal fork about halfway between fork and cell - adamantius Fldr. (= macedon Wall.). A large form with long, falcate forewing and long, broad-tailed hindwing. The greenish blue basal area reaches on the forewing about to the lower median and does not quite fill up the cell of the hindwing, the green submarginal band is very broad and in many examples from North Celebes broader than in most of the specimens from the south of the island; the grey discal band of the forewing beneath is - broad and extends nearly to the cell. The pilose stripe on the 1. median is mostly isolated and in many specimens the stripe on the submedian is absent. The female is very similar to the male the basal area somewhat less densely scaled and the under surface paler. From North, Central and South Celebes; common, especially in the hills. From the Sulla Islands no Gloss-Papilio is yet known.Karl Jordan in Seitz.

== Subspecies ==
- Papilio peranthus peranthus (Java)
- Papilio peranthus adamantius C. & R. Felder, 1865 (Celebes)
- Papilio peranthus intermedius Snellen, 1890 (Tanadjampea, Bonerate, Kalaotoa)
- Papilio peranthus fulgens Röber, 1891 (Bonerate, Lombok, Sambawa, Flores, Pura, Adonara)
- Papilio peranthus baweanus Hagen, 1896 (Bawean)
- Papilio peranthus transiens Fruhstorfer, 1897 (Lesser Sunda Islands)
- Papilio peranthus insulicola Rothschild, 1896 (Saleyer)

== Taxonomy ==
Papilio peranthus is in a species group which includes

- Papilio lorquinianus C. Felder & R. Felder, 1865
- Papilio neumoegeni Honrath, 1890
- Papilio peranthus Fabricius, 1787
- Papilio pericles Wallace, 1865

== Gallery ==
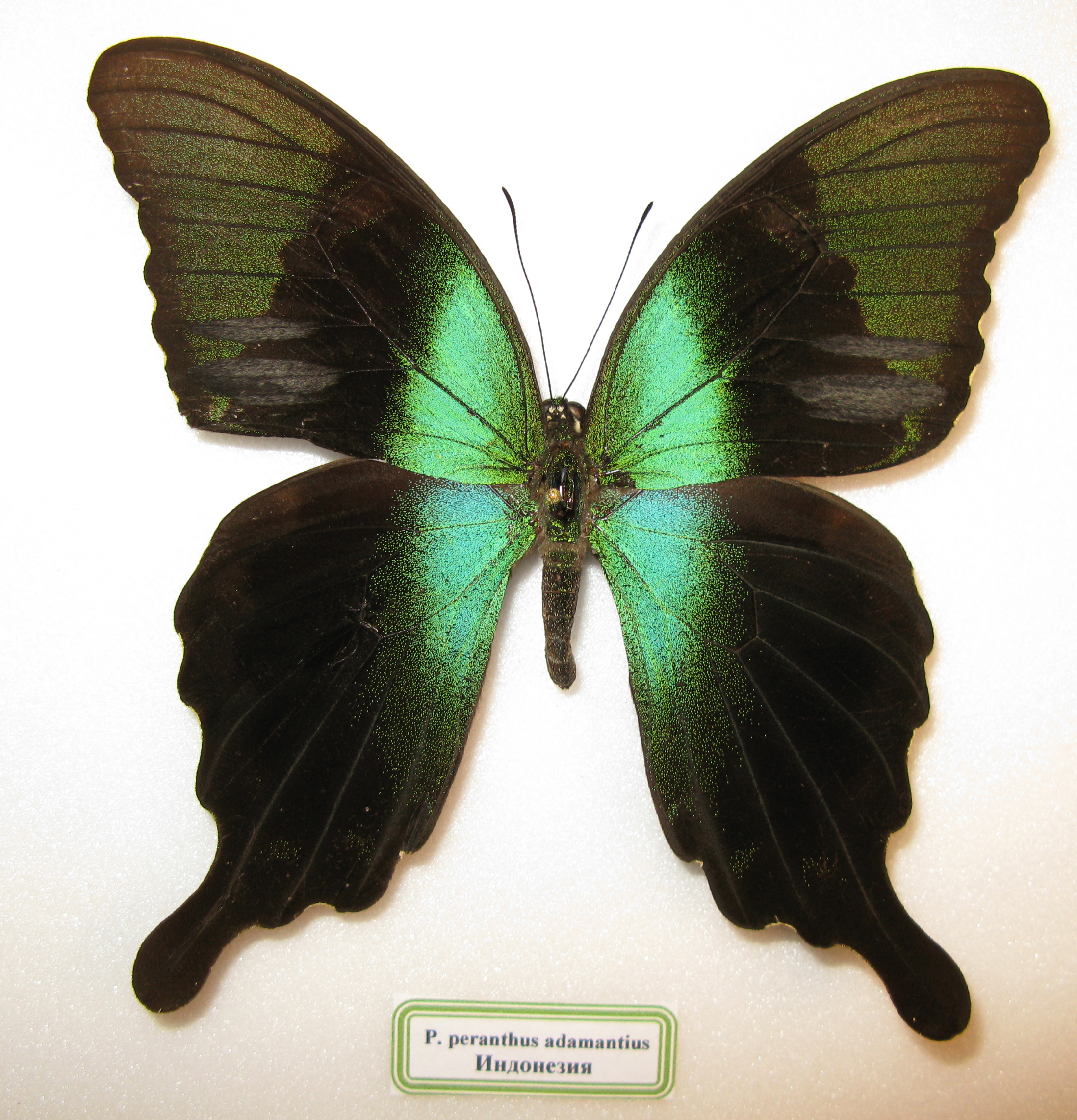
''Papilio peranthus'' ♂

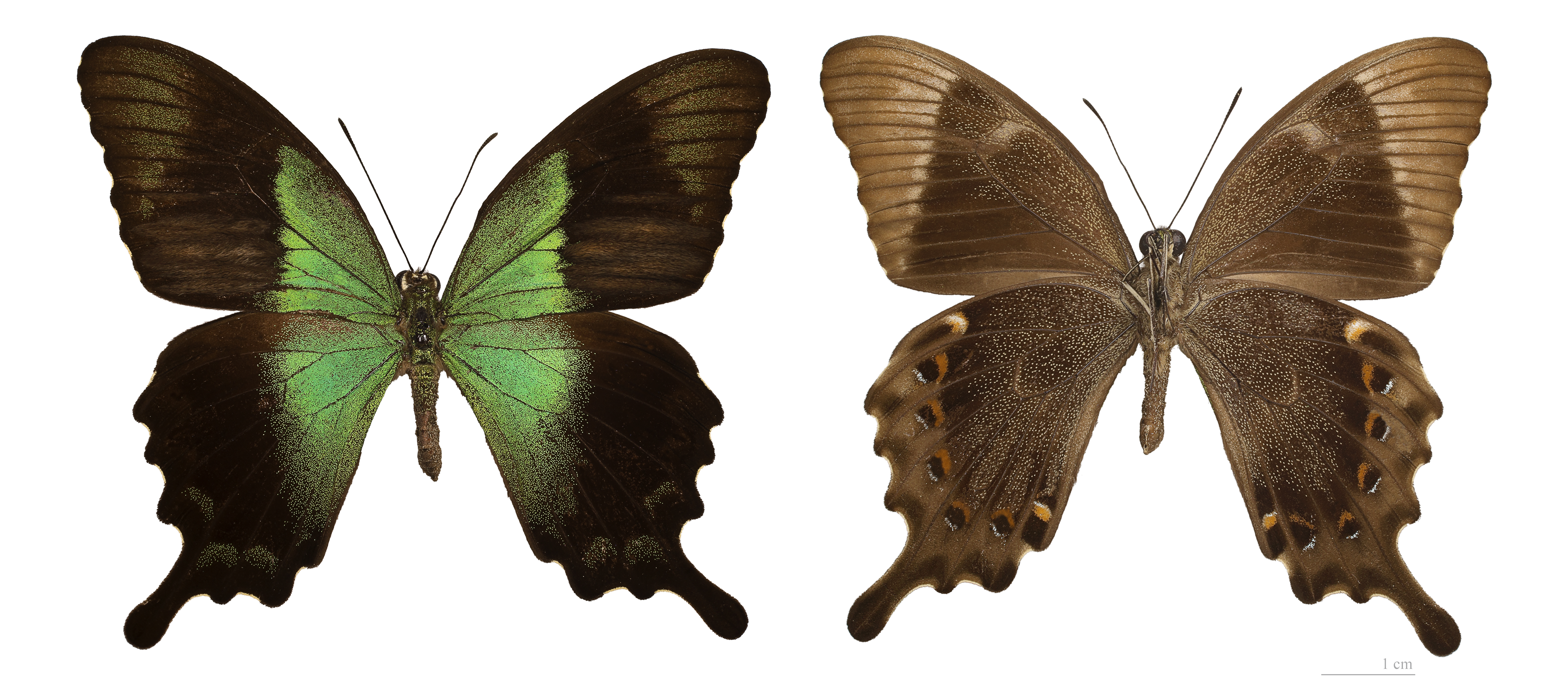
''Papilio peranthus'' ♀

== Other reading ==
- Erich Bauer and Thomas Frankenbach, 1998 Schmetterlinge der Erde, Butterflies of the world Part I (1), Papilionidae Papilionidae I: Papilio, Subgenus Achillides, Bhutanitis, Teinopalpus. Edited by Erich Bauer and Thomas Frankenbach. Keltern : Goecke & Evers; Canterbury : Hillside Books ISBN 9783931374624
