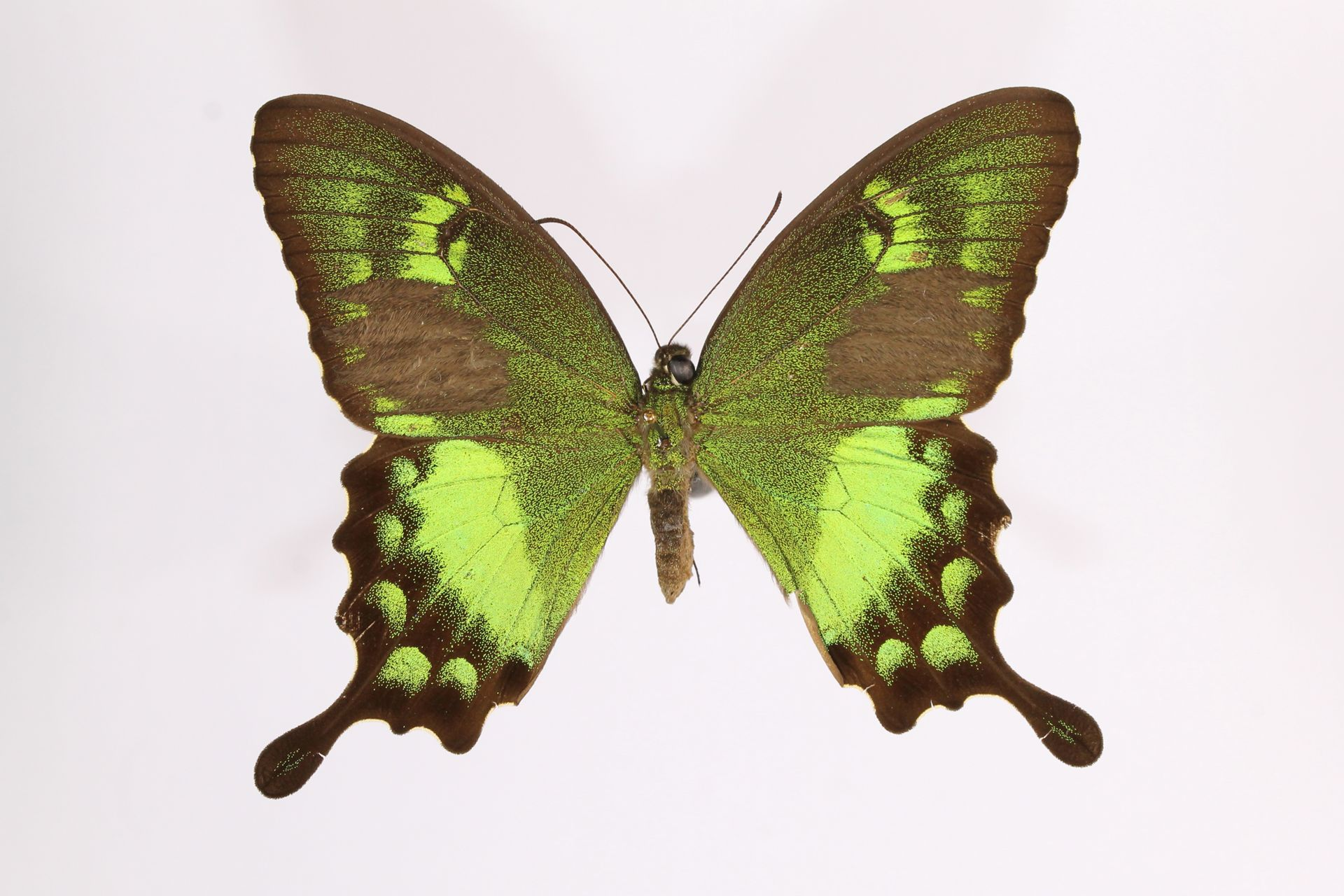

Conservation status
- Vulnerable (IUCN 2.3)

Scientific classification
- Kingdom: Animalia
- Phylum: Arthropoda
- Clade: Pancrustacea
- Class: Insecta
- Order: Lepidoptera
- Family: Papilionidae
- Genus: Papilio
- Species: P. neumoegeni

Binomial name
- Papilio neumoegeni Honrath, 1890

= Papilio neumoegeni =

Species of butterfly

Papilio neumoegeni is a species of butterfly in the family Papilionidae. It is endemic to the islands of Sumba in Indonesia.

== Description ==
Papilio neumoegeni has a forewing length of 43–48 mm.

Male: The upperside forewing is black with metallic, golden-green scales scattered over most of the wing excluding the outer and costal margins. A metallic, golden-green median band starting from the costa passes outside the cell to just inside the tornus. It is interrupted in the lower part by a large brown-black sex brand. The upperside hindwing has a scalloped outer edge and a long, spatulate tail which may bear green scaling over the tips. The ground colour black has metallic golden-green scales which are scattered over the basal third of the wing. A broad emerald-green discal band extends inwards over the cell apex (not over the black hindwing apex), and a series of large emerald-green lunules or spots sometimes merge into the band subapically.

The underside is brownish black with a few golden scales scattered over all but the lighter coloured distal part. The underside of the forewing has an oblique, pale grey postdiscal band tapering towards the tornus. The discal region of the under hindwing has a border of black lunules and a black eyespot. These are all edged with orange and pale blue.

Female: Slightly larger than the male, differing in the lack of a sex brand on the upperside of the forewing. She may be browner and have an ochrous subapical spot on the upper hindwing.

Seitz- P. neumoegeni Honr. (= maremba Doh.) (36 c). upper surface with the exception of the distal margin scaled with green; forewing with lighter green, densely scaled discal band, which is interrupted by a very large pilose patch, the green scaling sparse distally to the anterior part of the green band which is placed at the apex of the cell; hindwing with broad, light green discal band and submarginal spots of the same colour.Female recalling P. palinurus; not quite so densely scaled with green as in the male: forewing with green oblique band and feebly marked submarginal spots; the discal band of the hindwing narrower and anteriorly shorter than in the male. — Sumba, especially in the interior of the island

== Distribution ==
Papilio neumoegeni is found only on the island of Sumba.

== Habitat and ecology ==
Males are known to fly all year round along paths or in forest glades. They rest in bushes during the afternoon Associated species are Papilio polytes and Atrophaneura oreon. The female flies slowly and generally high up in the forest canopy. The larval food plant is not known.

== Taxonomy ==
Papilio neumoegeni is in a species group which includes

- Papilio lorquinianus C. Felder & R. Felder, 1865
- Papilio neumoegeni Honrath, 1890
- Papilio peranthus Fabricius, 1787
- Papilio pericles Wallace, 1865

== Sources ==
- Gimenez Dixon, M. (1996). "Papilio neumoegeni". IUCN Red List of Threatened Species. 1996 e.T16002A5350408. doi:10.2305/IUCN.UK.1996.RLTS.T16002A5350408.en.

== Other reading ==
- Erich Bauer and Thomas Frankenbach, 1998 Schmetterlinge der Erde, Butterflies of the World Part I (1), Papilionidae Papilionidae I: Papilio, Subgenus Achillides, Bhutanitis, Teinopalpus. Edited by Erich Bauer and Thomas Frankenbach. Keltern: Goecke & Evers; Canterbury: Hillside Books, ISBN 9783931374624 plate 6, figures 5–6
