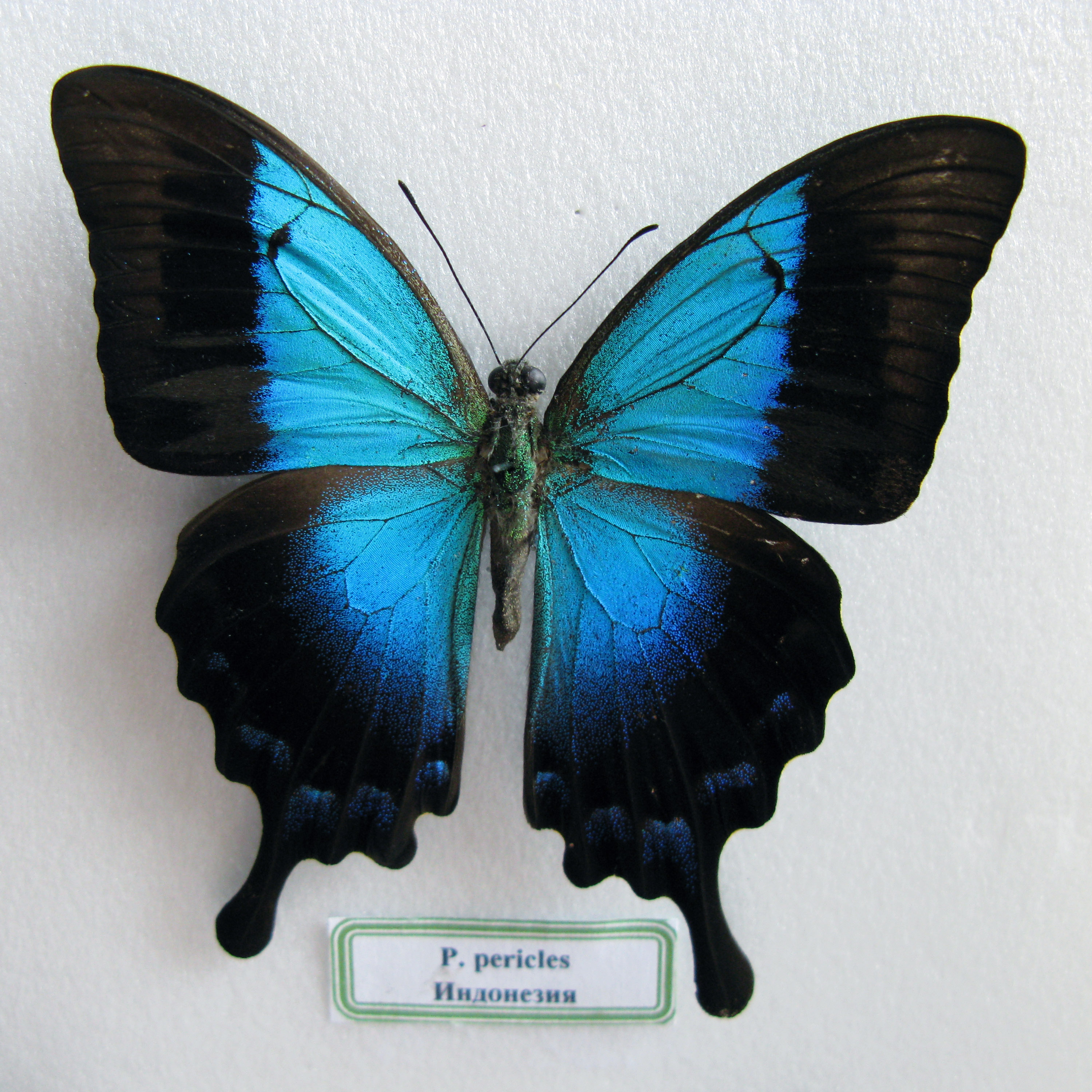

Scientific classification
- Kingdom: Animalia
- Phylum: Arthropoda
- Clade: Pancrustacea
- Class: Insecta
- Order: Lepidoptera
- Family: Papilionidae
- Genus: Papilio
- Species: P. pericles

Binomial name
- Papilio pericles Wallace, 1865

Synonyms
- Princeps pericles

= Papilio pericles =

Species of butterfly

Papilio pericles, the Timor blue swallowtail is a butterfly of the family Papilionidae. it is found on Timor and the surrounding islands eastward to the Tanimbar archipelago.

The wingspan is 70–90 mm. P. pericles Wall. (= hekaton Fruhst., hermogenes Fruhst., olympiodorus Fruhst.) (37 b). The blue metallic area always reaches beyond the apex of the cell of the forewing and is distally cut off straight as in P. peranthus, only in the female the lower angle of the cell sometimes remains black. Upper surface of the hindwing with 5 or 6 blue submarginal spots, on the other hand the submarginal band of the forewing is only indicated by a very few blue and yellowish scales, whilst the deep black discal band is distinct. The pale discal band of the forewing beneath is placed distally to the subcostal fork and is proximally somewhat yellowish and almost entirely straight; the yellow lunules of the hindwing are deeper yellow than in P. peranthus, also the costal lunule is almost entirely orange-yellow. The pilose stripes are very variable; they are sometimes all very narrow and in that case are isolated. The genitalia are strikingly different from those of the preceding species [in the species group]. — The earlier stages not known. Distributed from Timor and Wetter to the Tenimber Islands: Dutch and Portuguese Timor, Wetter, Moa, Letti, Roma, Dammer, Babber and Tenimber (Selaru and Sjerra), probably also on the other islands of this group. Karl Jordan in Seitz.

== Taxonomy ==
Papilio pericles is in a species group which includes

- Papilio lorquinianus C. Felder & R. Felder, 1865
- Papilio neumoegeni Honrath, 1890
- Papilio peranthus Fabricius, 1787
- Papilio pericles Wallace, 1865

== Other reading ==
- Erich Bauer and Thomas Frankenbach, 1998 Schmetterlinge der Erde, Butterflies of the world Part I (1), Papilionidae Papilionidae I: Papilio, Subgenus Achillides, Bhutanitis, Teinopalpus. Edited by Erich Bauer and Thomas Frankenbach. Keltern : Goecke & Evers; Canterbury : Hillside Books ISBN 9783931374624
