= Pierre Joseph Michel Lorquin =

French entomologist (1797–1873)

Pierre Joseph Michel Lorquin (2 July 1797, Valenciennes – 8 February 1873, Paris) was a French entomologist who specialised in Coleoptera and Lepidoptera.

In 1847/48 he collected for Charles Oberthur and Jean Baptiste Boisduval in Andalusia and Algeria, between 1849 and 1858 in California and Oregon, from 1859–1860 in China and the Philippines and from 1860–1865 in Celebes, Moluccas, Aru and New Guinea. Finally from 1866–1869 he collected in Colombia and again in California.

He is honoured in the butterfly names Lorquin's admiral and Papilio lorquinianus. The Lorquin Entomological Society founded in Southern California is named after him.
