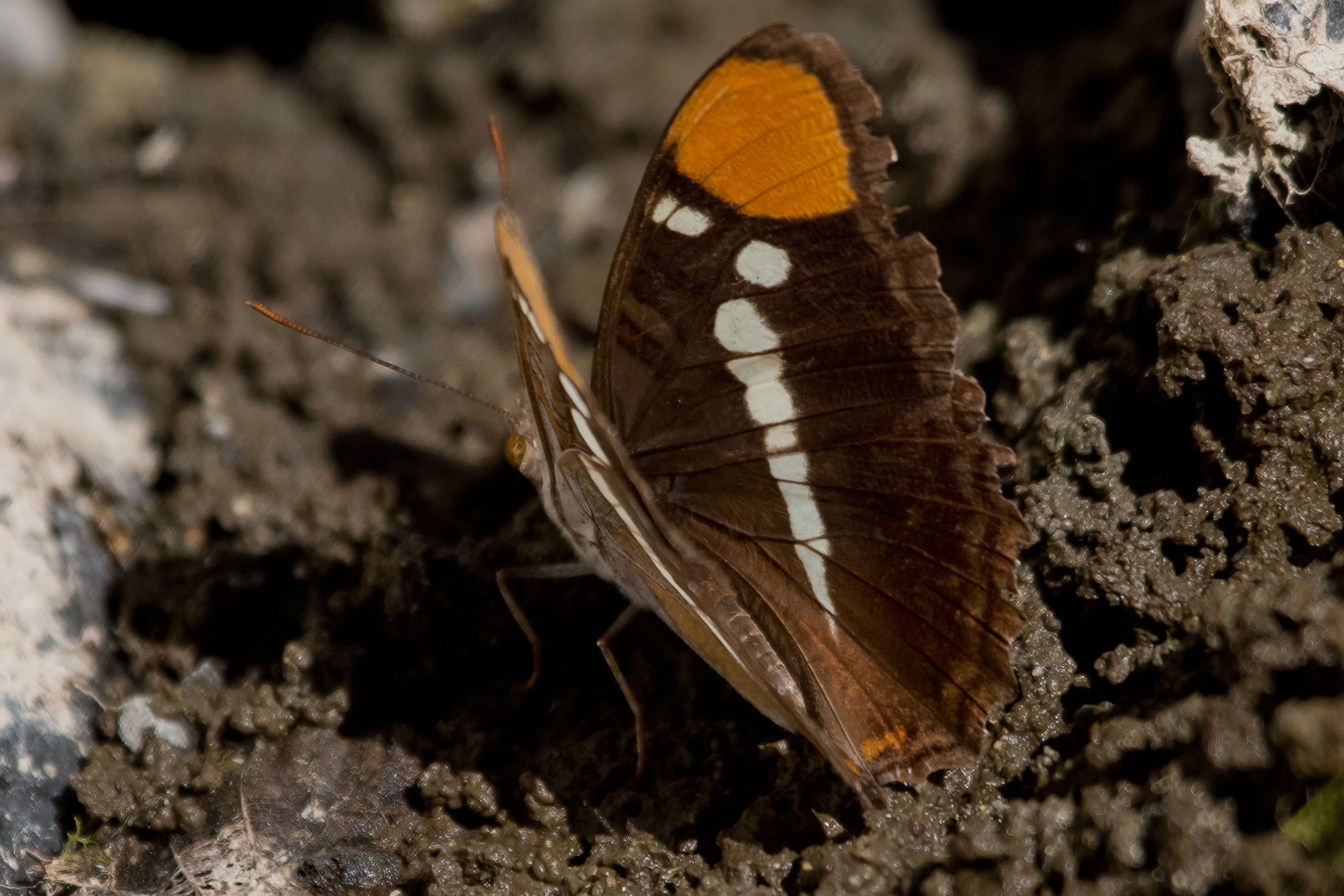
- California sister (Adelpha bredowii)

Scientific classification
- Kingdom: Animalia
- Phylum: Arthropoda
- Clade: Pancrustacea
- Class: Insecta
- Order: Lepidoptera
- Family: Nymphalidae
- Genus: Adelpha
- Species: A. bredowii

Binomial name
- Adelpha bredowii Geyer, 1837

Synonyms
- Adelpha bredowii bredowii Geyer, 1837

= Adelpha bredowii =

Bredow's sister

Species of butterfly

Adelpha bredowii, the Bredow's sister, is a species of butterfly in the family Nymphalidae. It is endemic to western, central, and southern Mexico. It belongs to the serpa species group in the genus Adelpha (sisters). The species previously included two subspecies, the California sister (Adelpha bredowii californica) and the Arizona sister (Adelpha bredowii eulalia). Recent phylogenetic studies, however, conclude that morphological, geographical, and genetic evidence support their classification as separate species. They have been reclassified as the species Adelpha californica and Adelpha eulalia, respectively.
