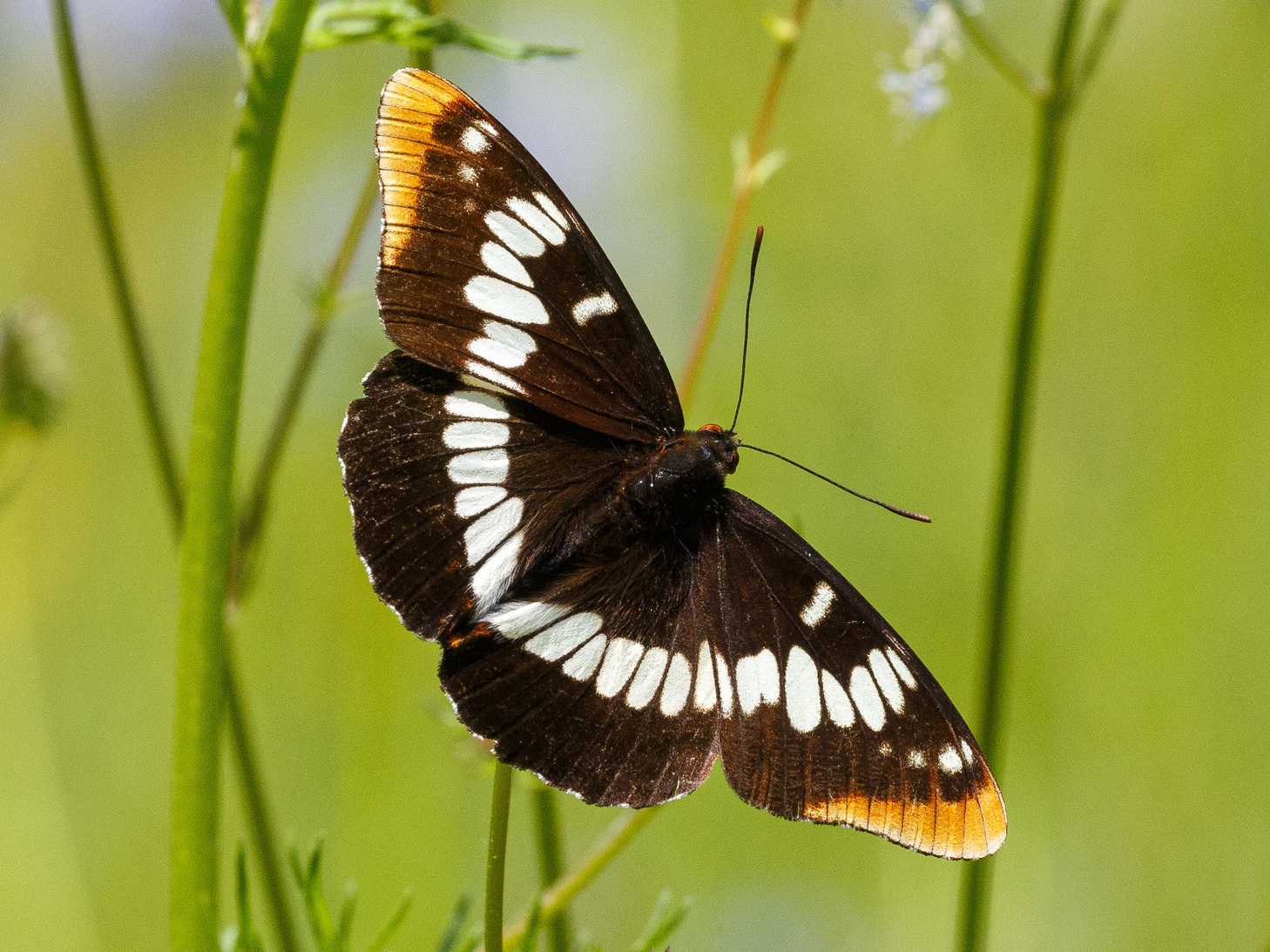

Scientific classification
- Kingdom: Animalia
- Phylum: Arthropoda
- Clade: Pancrustacea
- Class: Insecta
- Order: Lepidoptera
- Family: Nymphalidae
- Genus: Limenitis
- Species: L. lorquini

Binomial name
- Limenitis lorquini (Boisduval, 1852)

Synonyms
- Basilarchia lorquini

= Lorquin's admiral =

Species of butterfly

Lorquin's admiral (Limenitis lorquini) is a butterfly in the Nymphalinae subfamily. The butterfly is named after Pierre Joseph Michel Lorquin, a French naturalist who came to California from France during the Gold Rush, and made important discoveries on the natural history of the terrain.

== Distribution ==
The Lorquin's admiral can mostly be found across the Upper Sonoran to the Canadian Zone, east to western Montana and Idaho. Known areas include southern British Columbia (including Vancouver Island, north of Emerald Lake), and Cypress Hills in southwestern Saskatchewan as well as southwestern Alberta.

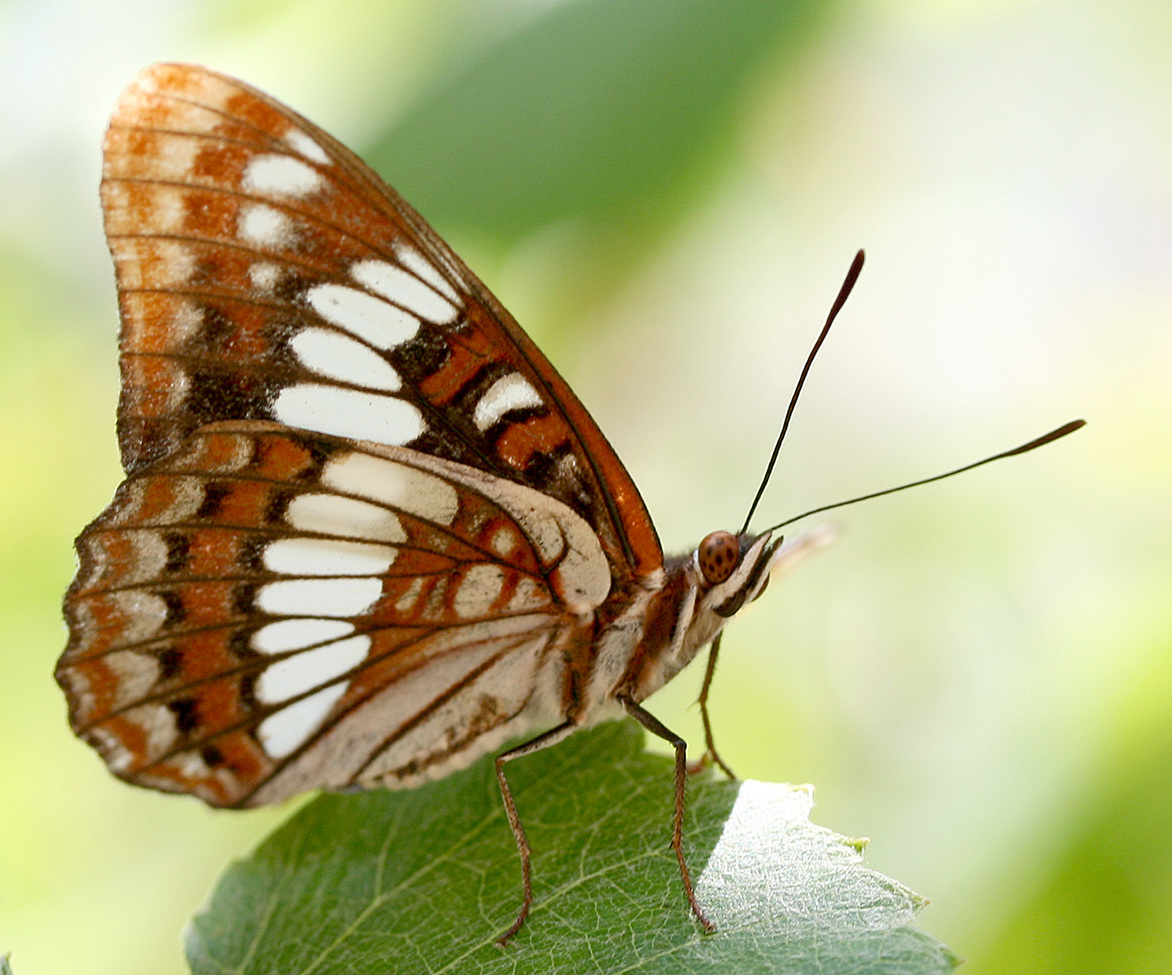
In California

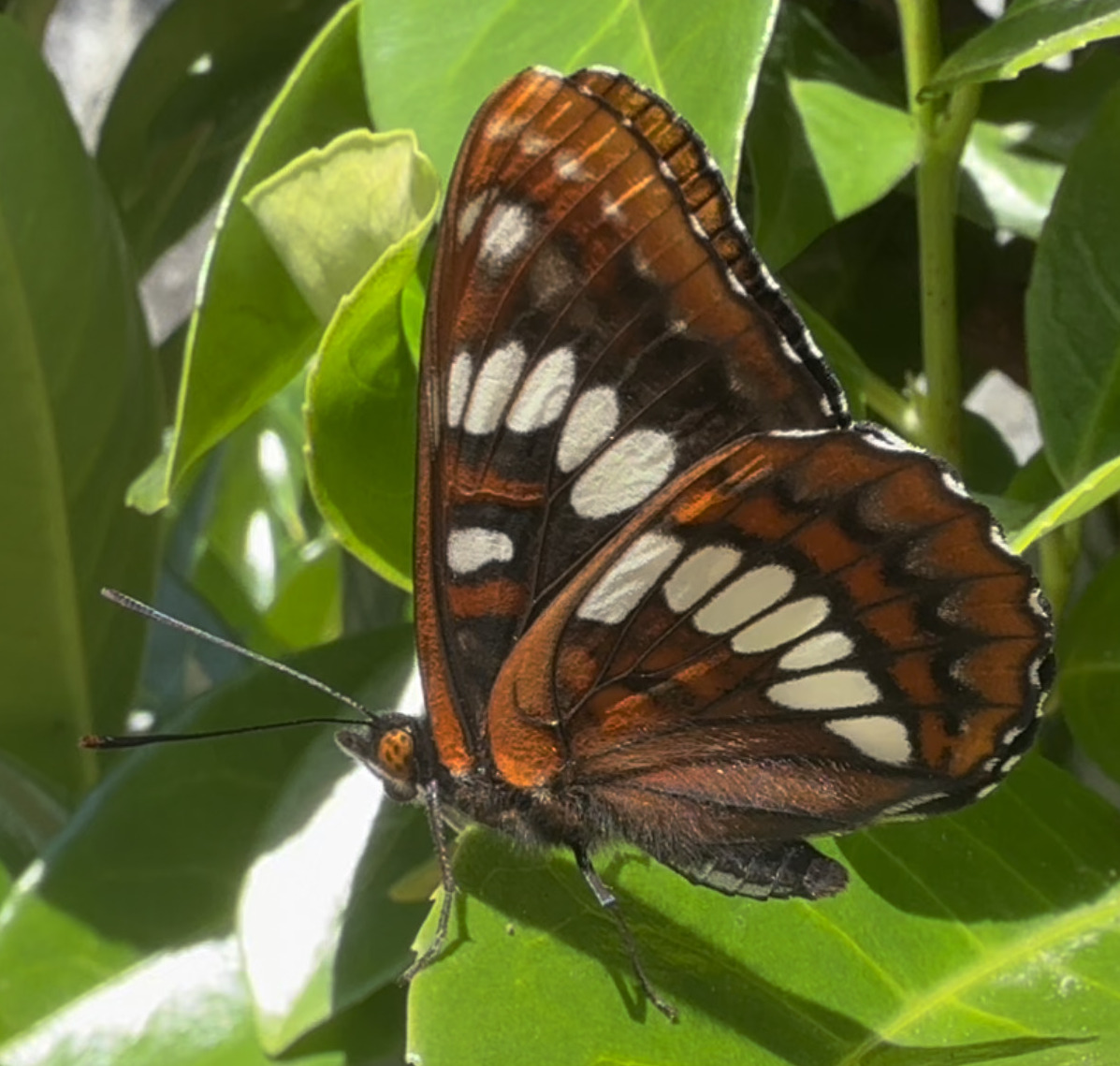
In British Columbia

== Habitat ==
The butterfly resides mostly in forest edges, mountain canyons, parks, streamsides, fencerows, orchards, and groves of cottonwood and poplar. Usually the butterflies feed on California buckeye, yerba santa, privet, bird droppings, and dung. They are extremely territorial and will attack any intruders into their habitat, including large birds.

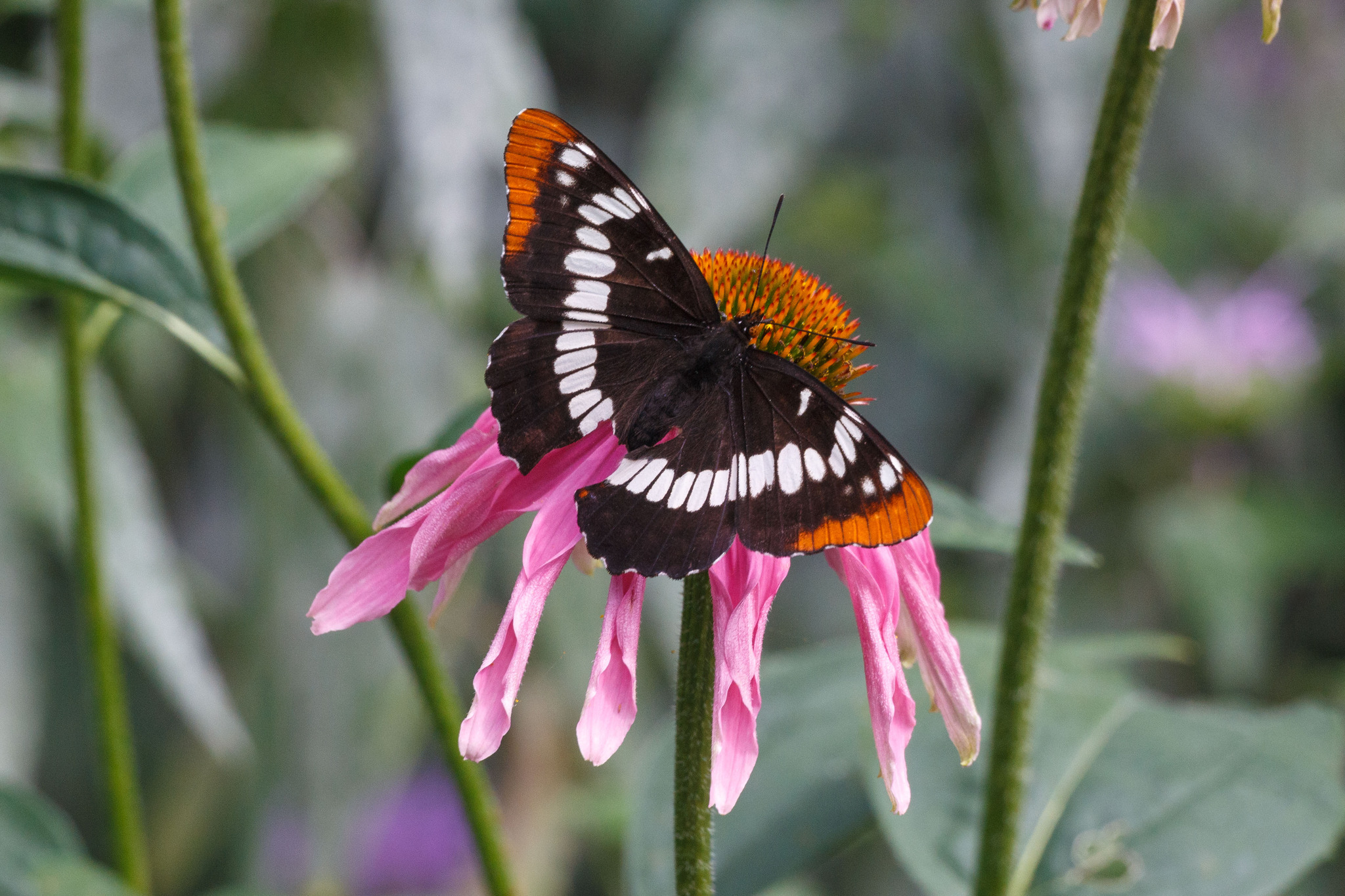
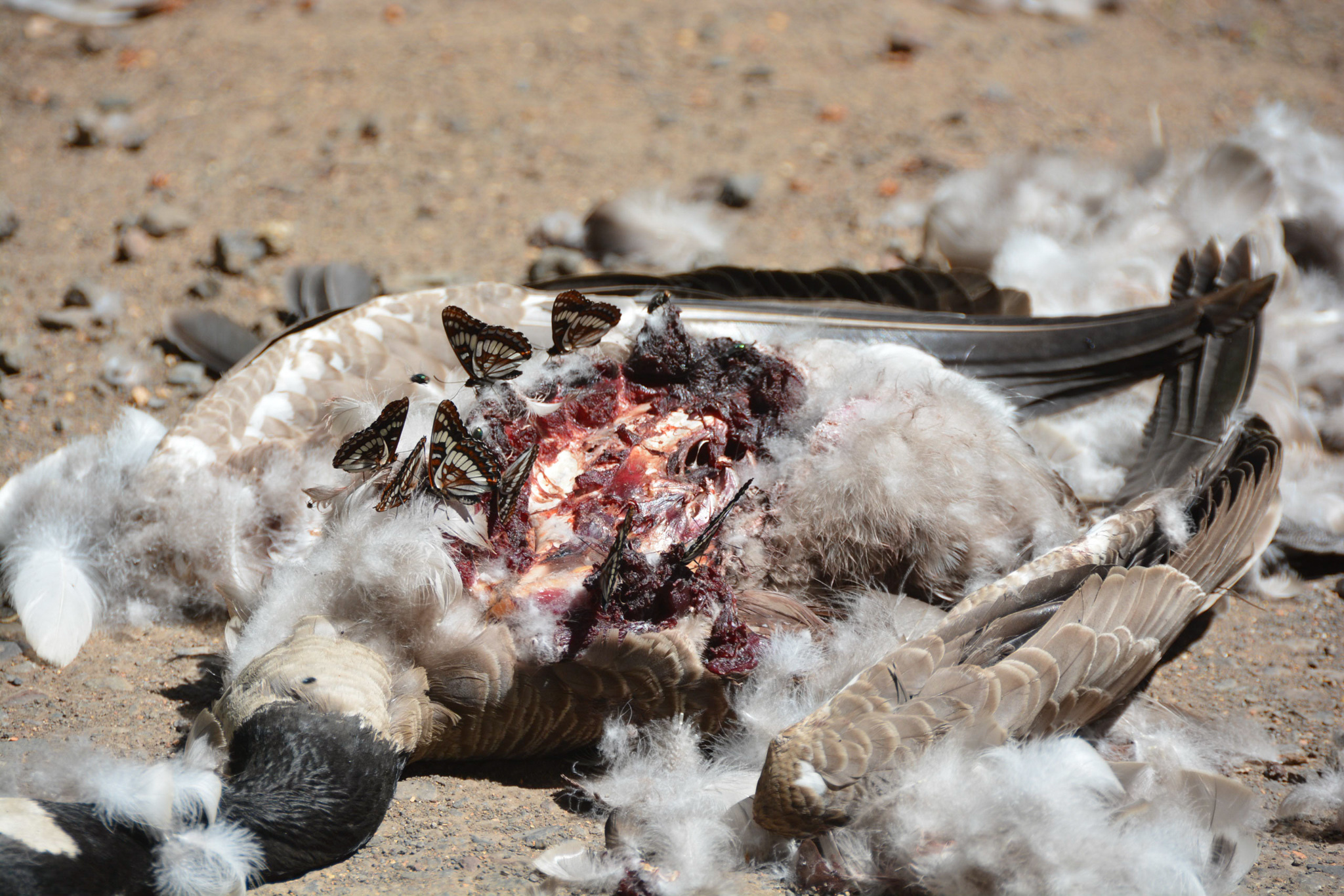
Feeding on coneflower nectar (top) and puddling on carrion from a Canada goose carcass (bottom)

== Description ==
The Lorquin's admiral has brown-black wings, each with a row of white spots across it. Its forewings have orange tips. Wingspan: 47 to 71 mm; females are generally larger than males.

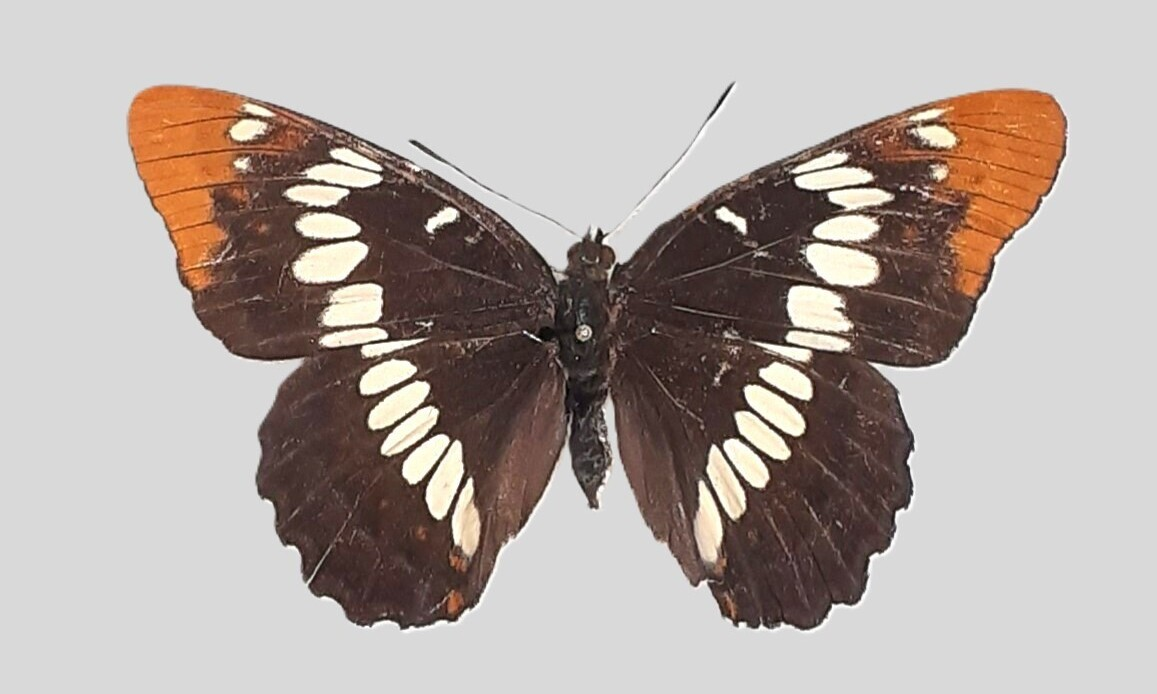
Dorsal

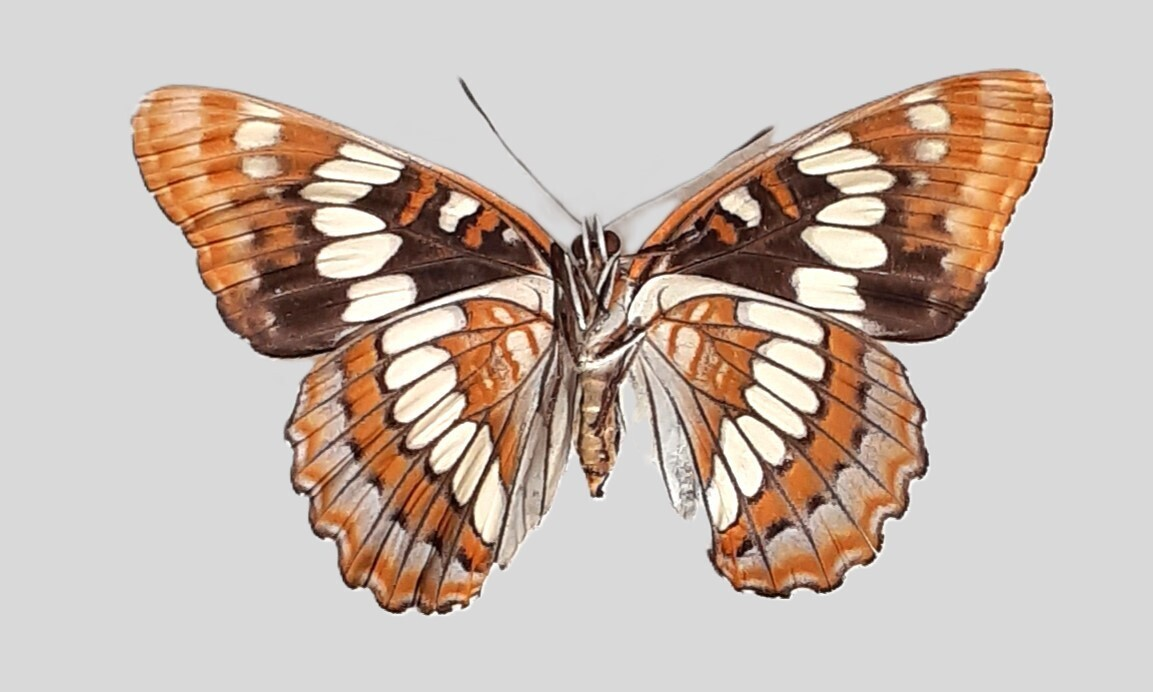
Ventral

== Larvae ==
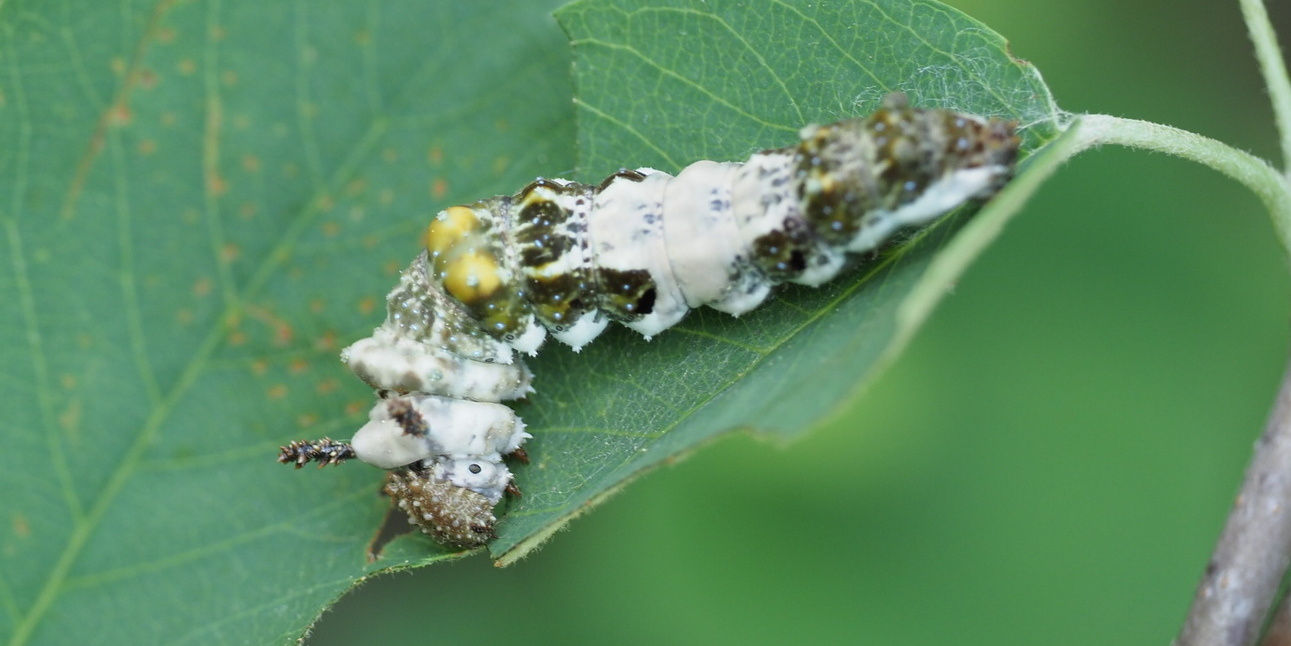
Larva

Larvae are usually yellow with a patch of white on the back. Eggs are laid near or on the tips of leaves. Common trees that the larvae feed on include willow (Salix), poplar, cherry (Prunus), cottonwood (Populus), and an assortment of orchard trees, including cherry, apple, and plum.

== Flight season ==
Lorquin's admiral usually flies around April to October, though it depends on the region. Butterflies in northern areas tend to have one brood a year (usually between June and August) whereas southern butterflies (mainly in California) tend to have multiple broods.

== Gallery ==
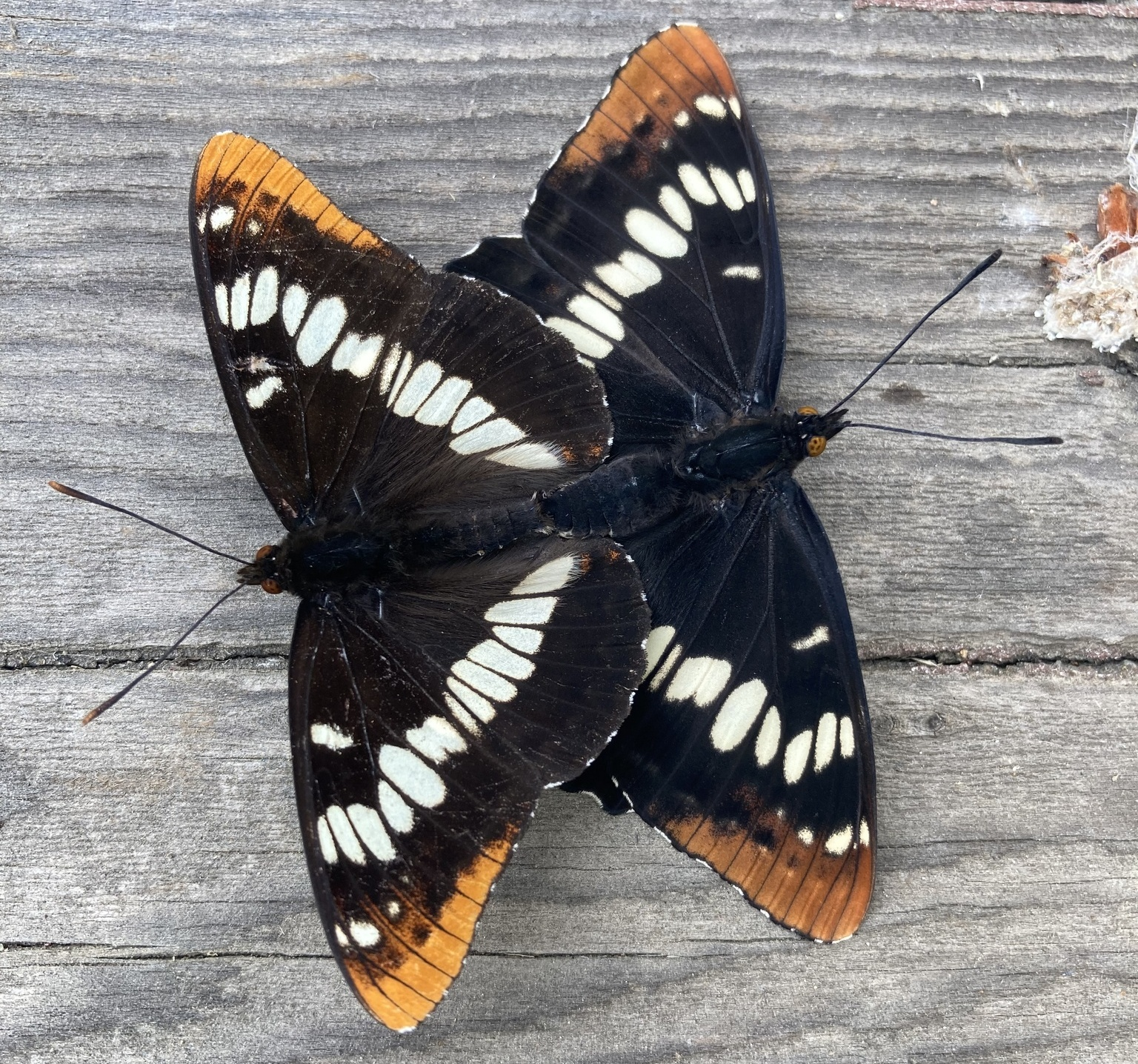
Male (left) and female (right) mating.

In Victoria, British Columbia

== Similar species ==
- California sister butterfly (Adelpha bredowii californica)
- Weidemeyer's admiral (L. weidemeyerii)
- White admiral (L. arthemis)
