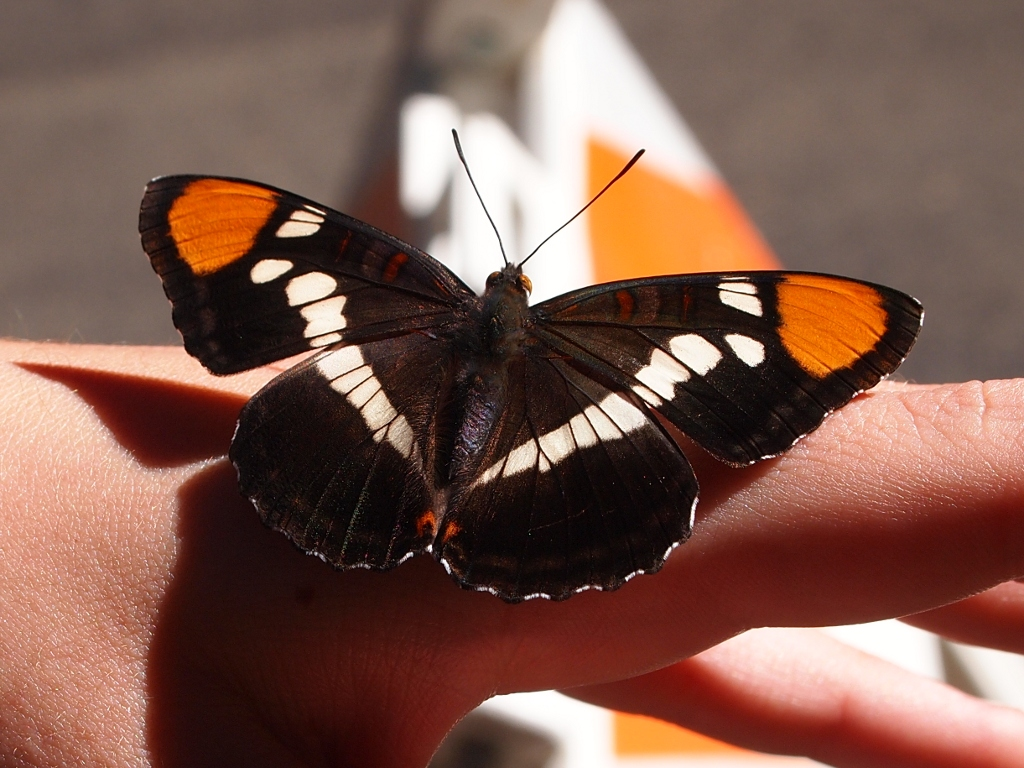

Conservation status
- Secure (NatureServe)

Scientific classification
- Kingdom: Animalia
- Phylum: Arthropoda
- Clade: Pancrustacea
- Class: Insecta
- Order: Lepidoptera
- Family: Nymphalidae
- Genus: Adelpha
- Species: A. californica

Binomial name
- Adelpha californica (Butler, 1865)

Synonyms
- Adelpha bredowii californica (Butler, 1865); Heterochroa californica Butler, 1865; Heterochroa bredowii californica Butler, 1865; Limenitis bredowii californica (Butler, 1865); Limenitis californica (Butler, 1865)

= Adelpha californica =

California sister

Species of butterfly

Adelpha californica, the California sister, is a species of butterfly in the family Nymphalidae. They are common in California, but can also be found in western Nevada and Oregon, as well as in northern Baja California. The upper surfaces of their wings are dark brown to black with wide cream white bands dissecting both wings and two orange patches near the tips of the forewings. The underside is variously colored with browns, blue, orange, and white. A. californica is unpalatable to predators and is part of a large mimicry complex.

== Taxonomy ==
Adelpha californica is classified under the genus Adelpha (sisters) in the tribe Limenitidini of the subfamily Limenitidinae (admirals and relatives) of the brush-footed butterfly family Nymphalidae. It belongs to the serpa species group of the genus. The species was first described by the British entomologist Arthur Gardiner Butler in 1865 as Heterochroa californica. The type specimen was recovered from California.

It was treated generally as a species (though it included Adelpha eulalia as a synonym) until 1944, when the entomologists Geoffrey Douglas Hale Carpenter and Bertram Maurice Hobby reclassified it as a subspecies of Adelpha bredowii. Recent phylogenetic studies, however, conclude that morphological, geographical, and genetic evidence make it clear that it is a separate species.

A. californica was also sometimes included in the genus Limenitis (admirals), but most modern lepidopterists classify it under the genus Adelpha.

== Distribution and habitat ==
A. californica is found in the extreme western North America, from northern Baja California of Mexico, most of California, western Nevada, western Oregon of the United States. It may also sometimes be found in southwestern Washington, though these are believed to be vagrant individuals. They are abundant in oak woodlands.

== Description ==
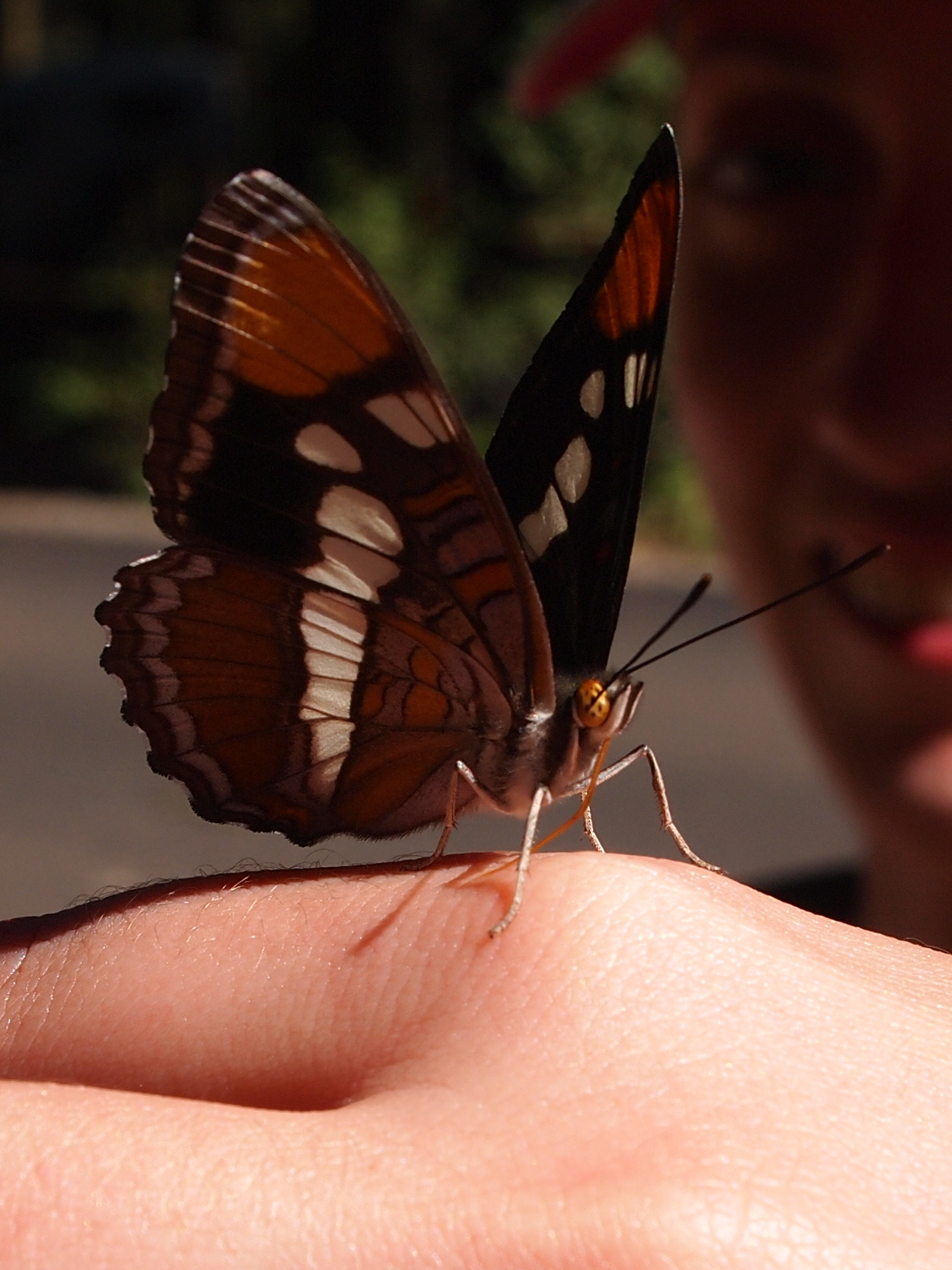
Underside of wings

The upper surfaces of the wings of A. californica are a dark brown to black. It has two large orange patches near the tip of the forewings and wide postdiscal creamy-white bands on both wings. The ventral surfaces of the wings are generally similar but with blue bands along the edges of both wings, as well as blue and orange patterns on the corners near the body. Like other members of the genus, the butterfly is named "sister" for its black and white markings on the forewing that resemble a nun's habit.

A. californica closely resembles A. bredowii and A. eulalia. However it generally does not share the same distribution range as the other two. A. bredowii is only found in southern and western Mexico. A. eulalia is found in Arizona and the surrounding areas, though it may sometimes be found in southeastern California. They also differ morphologically from A. eulalia in usually being smaller and in the presence of a second orange bar in the upper proximal corner of the hindwings. A. californica also closely resembles the females of some species in the genus Doxocopa. Though their distribution range also do not overlap, as Doxocopa are primarily found in Mexico, Central America, the Caribbean, and South America.

Other species which resemble A. californica (though not as closely) includes other members of the genus Adelpha, and the Lorquin's admiral (Limenitis lorquini).

== Ecology and life cycle ==
The eggs of A. californica are green. They are laid singly on tips of leaves of oak plants (genus Quercus), on the upper surface. There are five larval instars. The first instar hatches from the egg after eleven days. It is olive green with pale flecks and a mottled light and dark brown head. It builds leaf perches from the leaf midrib, like the larvae of other members of the genus. After nine days, it molts into the second instar which is green with various shades of brown and a light brown head. After eight days it molts again into the third instar which is a pale brownish yellow covered densely in yellowish conical tubercles. It also has developing scoli (horn-like protrusions) each tipped with four to five black spines. The head is a pale green with four vertical brown stripes and also covered with tubercles. The fourth instar develops after four days and is a light reddish brown with greenish sides, yellowish tubercles, and fully developed scoli as well as new developing ones. It molts after nine days into the last instar which is olive green with brown undersides and legs, it is densely covered with yellowish tubercles (particularly at the bottom surfaces). All segments now possess scoli, some bearing white thick conical spines with black tips. The head is brown to pale brown, flattened and smooth, with a double row of long yellowish-white spines at the sides and a pair of black dorsal spines. The second to fifth instars all adopt a front-arched-rear-up posture when resting. After fourteen days, the final instar will pupate. The pupa is pale brown to pale golden yellow with streaks and patches of dark brown and metallic gold. It is attached to tree trunks by a large silken web. The adults emerge after 10 days. The total development time from egg to adult is sixty-five days.

The usual host plants for the larvae are the canyon live oak (Quercus chrysolepis) and the coast live oak (Quercus agrifolia), as well as other species of oaks. This diet makes A. californica unpalatable to predators, which might explain why so many other species have formed a mimicry complex around it.

The adults are commonly found flying near the upper branches of oak trees or perching near small streams and canyons. Males are commonly seen engaging in mud-puddling in moist ground, typically in mid-morning. Both sexes also feed on nectar from flowers (though this is rare), as well as drink from rotting fruit, sap, and animal droppings. Depending on seasonal conditions and elevation, the species produces one to three generations annually, with the adults usually flying from March through November. Adults may sometimes last through the winter months.

== Conservation ==
The species is not considered threatened and is classified as G5 by NatureServe. It is abundant throughout its range.
