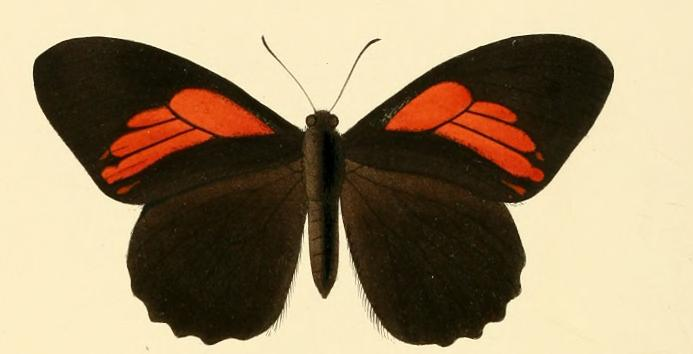

Scientific classification
- Kingdom: Animalia
- Phylum: Arthropoda
- Clade: Pancrustacea
- Class: Insecta
- Order: Lepidoptera
- Family: Papilionidae
- Genus: Papilio
- Species: P. euterpinus

Binomial name
- Papilio euterpinus Salvin & Godman, 1868

Synonyms
- Papilio euterpinus var. eburneus Fassl, 1912

= Papilio euterpinus =

Species of butterfly

Papilio euterpinus is a species of Neotropical swallowtail butterfly from the genus Papilio that is found in Colombia, Ecuador and Peru.

== Description ==
P. euterpinus Godm. & Salv. (12c). Tailless; markings of the upper surface yellowish red. The female similar to the male, is somewhat paler and larger. — From West Colombia to North Peru. The butterfly is an enlarged copy of the Pierid genus Pereute. The insect is usually considered as nearly allied to zagreus, but according to the structure and markings it belongs to the homerus-group near to cacicus. The butterfly is still very rare in collections.

== Taxonomy ==
Papilio euterpinus is a member of the homerus species-group. The members of this clade are

- Papilio cacicus Lucas, 1852
- Papilio euterpinus Salvin & Godman, 1868
- Papilio garamas (Geyer, [1829])
- Papilio homerus Fabricius, 1793
- Papilio menatius (Hübner, [1819])
- Papilio warscewiczii Hopffer, 1865

Papilio euterpinus is in the subgenus Pterourus Scopoli, 1777 which also includes the species-groups:- troilus species-group, glaucus species-group, the zagreus species-group and the scamander species-group.
