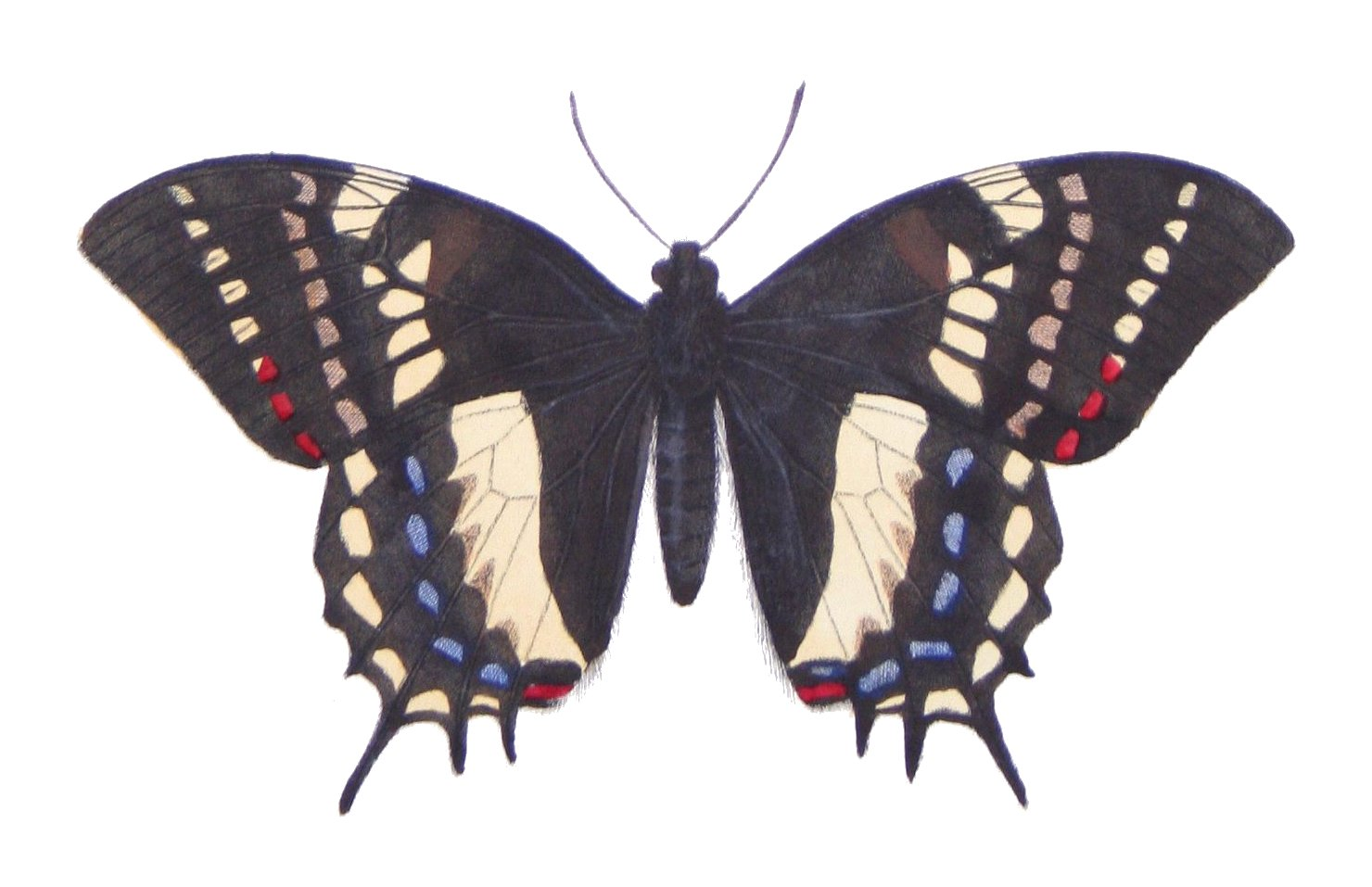

Scientific classification
- Kingdom: Animalia
- Phylum: Arthropoda
- Clade: Pancrustacea
- Class: Insecta
- Order: Lepidoptera
- Family: Papilionidae
- Genus: Papilio
- Species: P. cacicus

Binomial name
- Papilio cacicus H. Lucas, 1852

Synonyms
- Pyrrhosticta cacicus (H. Lucas, 1852); Pterourus cacicus (H. Lucas, 1852); Papilio zaddachii Dewitz, 1877; Papilio apollinaris Oberthür, 1915

= Papilio cacicus =

Species of butterfly

Papilio cacicus is a Neotropical butterfly of the family Papilionidae first described by Hippolyte Lucas in 1852. It is found in Colombia, Venezuela, Ecuador and Peru.

== Description ==
P. cacicus. Forewing with interrupted discal band, a variable cell-spot, rarely absent, a row of bluish grey postdiscal spots and a row of yellowish white submarginal ones, the last or the last few of the submarginal spots more or less orange: on the hindwing a yellowish white median band, a postdiscal row of blue spots and a submarginal row of yellowish white ones. The female occurs in 3 forms. Venezuela, Colombia, Ecuador and East Peru. — cacicus Luc. (12c). male: the cell-spot of the forewing, if present, more or less transverse. The 3 forms of the female are: female-f cacicus Luc., similar to the male; female f. zaddachi Dewitz, discal band of the forewing not interrupted and like the large cell-spot brownish orange, hindwing without discal band on the upper surface: female-f. nais R. & J. like female-f. zaddachi, but the markings of the forewing white. Mérida in Venezuela, Colombia and Ecuador. — inca R. & J. The cell-spot of the forewing much more oblique than in the preceding subspecies, forming with the median vein an acute angle; discal band of the hindwing convex distally, posteriorly strongly narrowed; the tail narrow, non-spatulate. Chanchamayo.

== Subspecies ==
- Papilio cacicus cacicus (Colombia, Venezuela)
- Papilio cacicus nesrinae Koçak, 1983 (western Colombia)
- Papilio cacicus inca Rothschild & Jordan, 1906 (Peru)
- Papilio cacicus upanensis Talbot, 1929 (Ecuador)
- Papilio cacicus mendozaensis Bollino & Sala, 1994 (Peru)

== Habitat ==
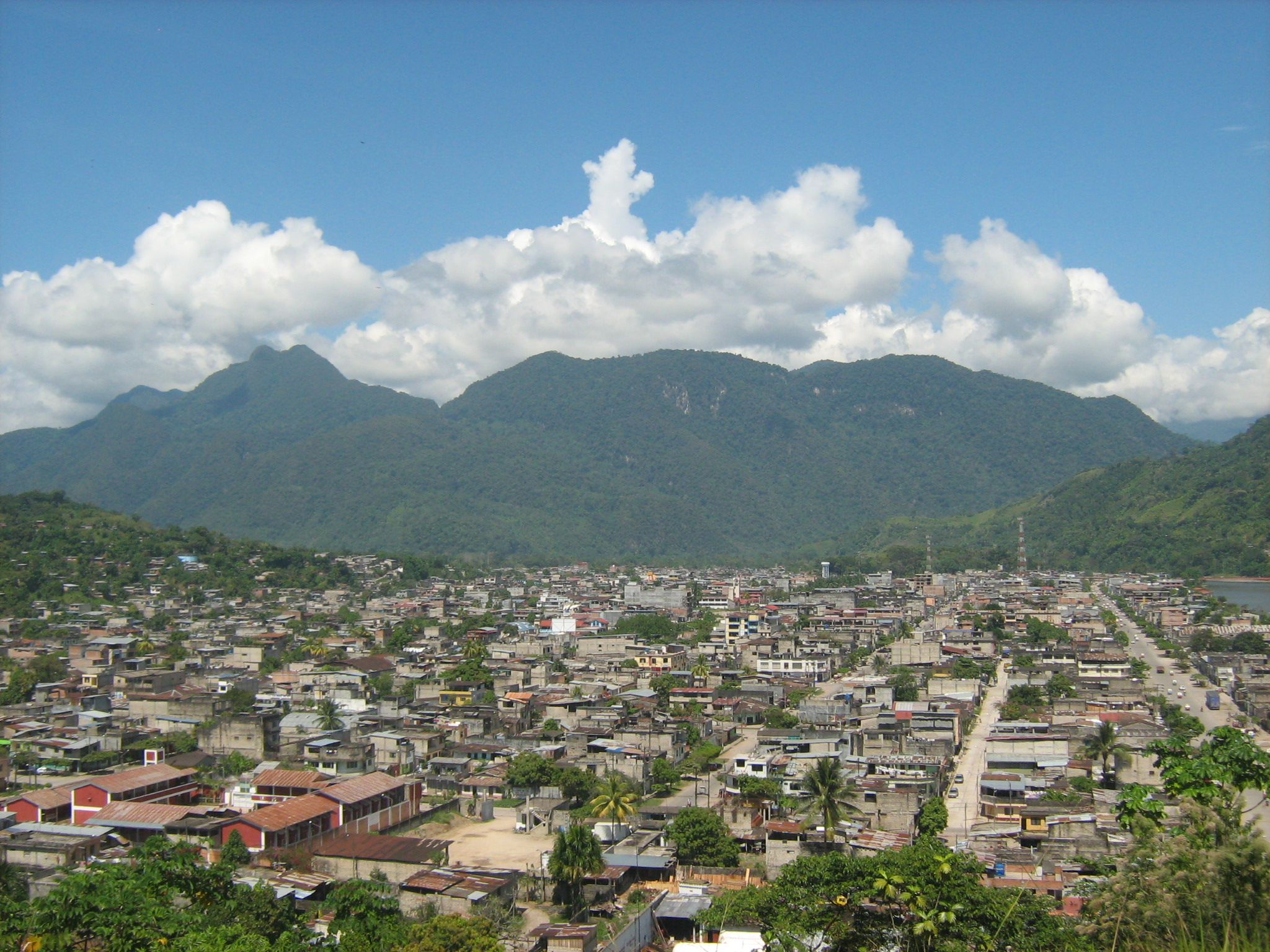
Montane forest in Tingo María, Peru

Papilio cacicus is an indicator species of primary mountain forest for instance in the Cordillera de la Costa montane forests in Venezuela and more generally in the tropical Andes.

== Taxonomy ==
Papilio cacicus is a member of the homerus species group. The members of this clade are

- Papilio cacicus H. Lucas, 1852
- Papilio euterpinus Salvin & Godman, 1868
- Papilio garamas (Geyer, [1829])
- Papilio homerus Fabricius, 1793
- Papilio menatius (Hübner, [1819])
- Papilio warscewiczii Hopffer, 1865

Papilio cacicus is in the subgenus Pterourus Scopoli, 1777 which also includes the species groups: troilus species group, glaucus species group, the zagreus species group and the scamander species group.

== Sources ==
- Collins, N. Mark; Morris, Michael G. (1985). Threatened Swallowtail Butterflies of the World: The IUCN Red Data Book. Gland & Cambridge: IUCN. ISBN 978-2-88032-603-6 – via Biodiversity Heritage Library.
- Lewis, H. L., 1974 Butterflies of the World ISBN 0-245-52097-X Page 24, figure 15 (underside).
