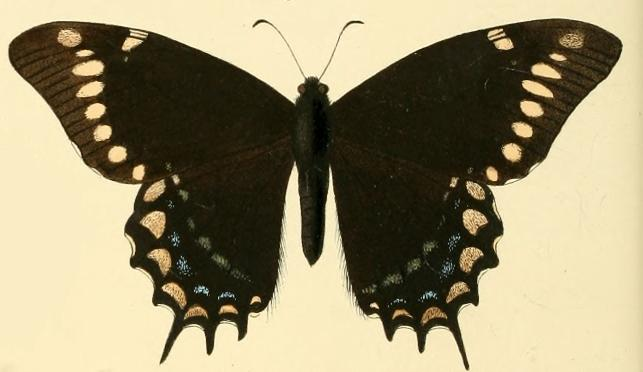

Scientific classification
- Kingdom: Animalia
- Phylum: Arthropoda
- Clade: Pancrustacea
- Class: Insecta
- Order: Lepidoptera
- Family: Papilionidae
- Genus: Papilio
- Species: P. warscewiczii

Binomial name
- Papilio warscewiczii Hopffer, 1866

Synonyms
- Papilio soratensis Salvin & Godman, 1868; Papilio jelskii Oberthür, 1881

= Papilio warscewiczii =

Species of butterfly

Papilio warscewiczii is a Neotropical species of swallowtail butterfly from the genus Papilio that is found in Peru, Bolivia and Ecuador.

== Habitat ==
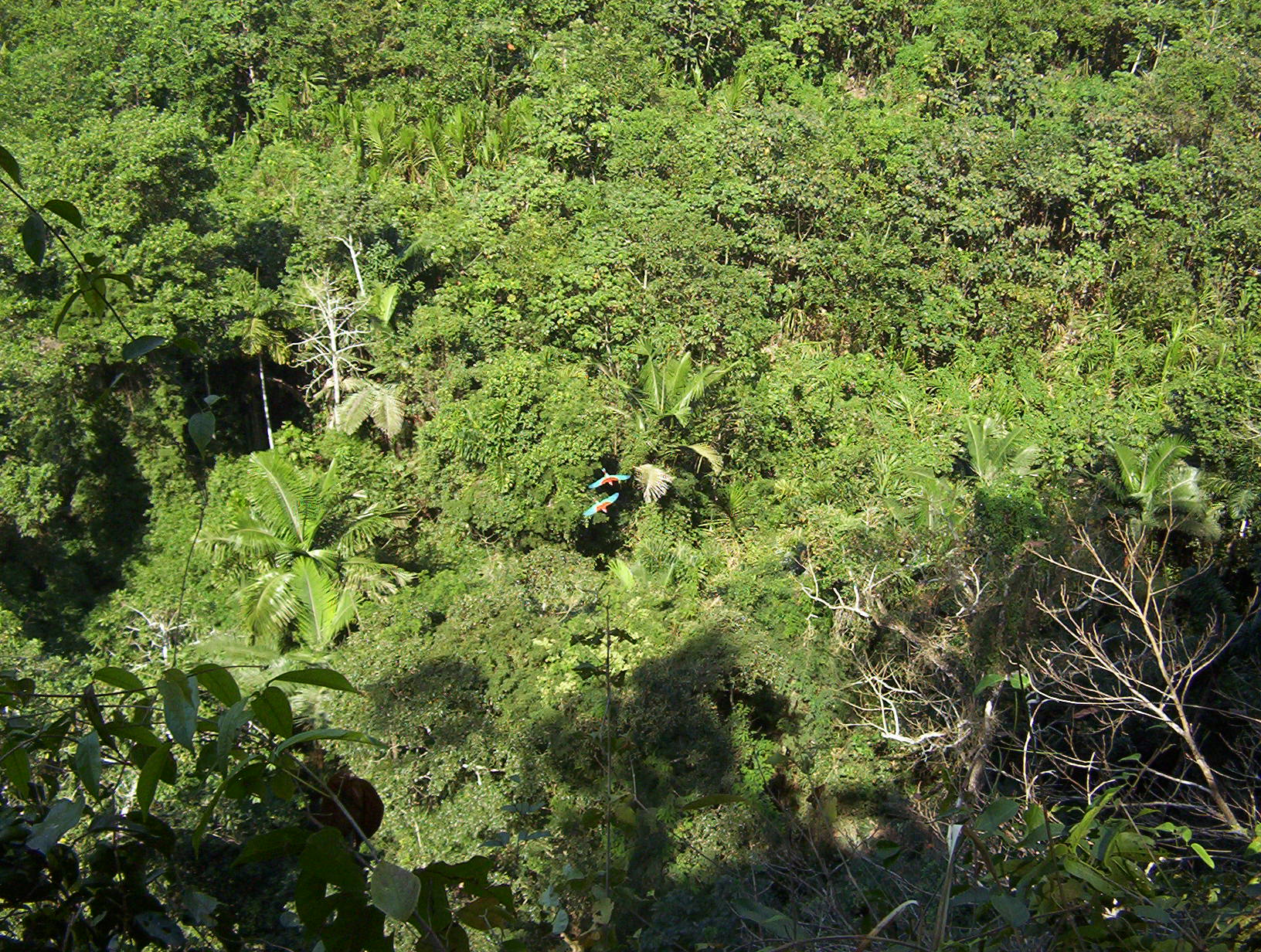
Moist rainforest in Madidi National Park, Bolivia

Montane forest in the Bolivian Yungas ecoregion. The larval food plant is not recorded .

== Subspecies ==
- Papilio warscewiczii warscewiczii (south-eastern Peru, Bolivia)
- Papilio warscewiczii mercedes Rothschild & Jordan, 1906 (eastern Peru)
- Papilio warscewiczii jelskii Oberthür, 1881 (south-eastern Ecuador, north-western Peru)

== Taxonomy ==
Papilio warscewiczii is a member of the homerus species group. The members of this clade are

- Papilio cacicus Lucas, 1852
- Papilio euterpinus Salvin & Godman, 1868
- Papilio garamas (Geyer, [1829])
- Papilio homerus Fabricius, 1793
- Papilio menatius (Hübner, [1819])
- Papilio warscewiczii Hopffer, 1865

and the enigmatic Papilio judicael known only from a handful of specimens and either a valid species from the Andean region, or a hybrid P. menatius × P. warscewiczii.

Papilio warscewiczii is in the subgenus Pterourus Scopoli, 1777 which also includes the species groups: troilus species group, glaucus species group, the zagreus species group and the scamander species group.

== Etymology ==
Named for the collector Józef Warszewicz
