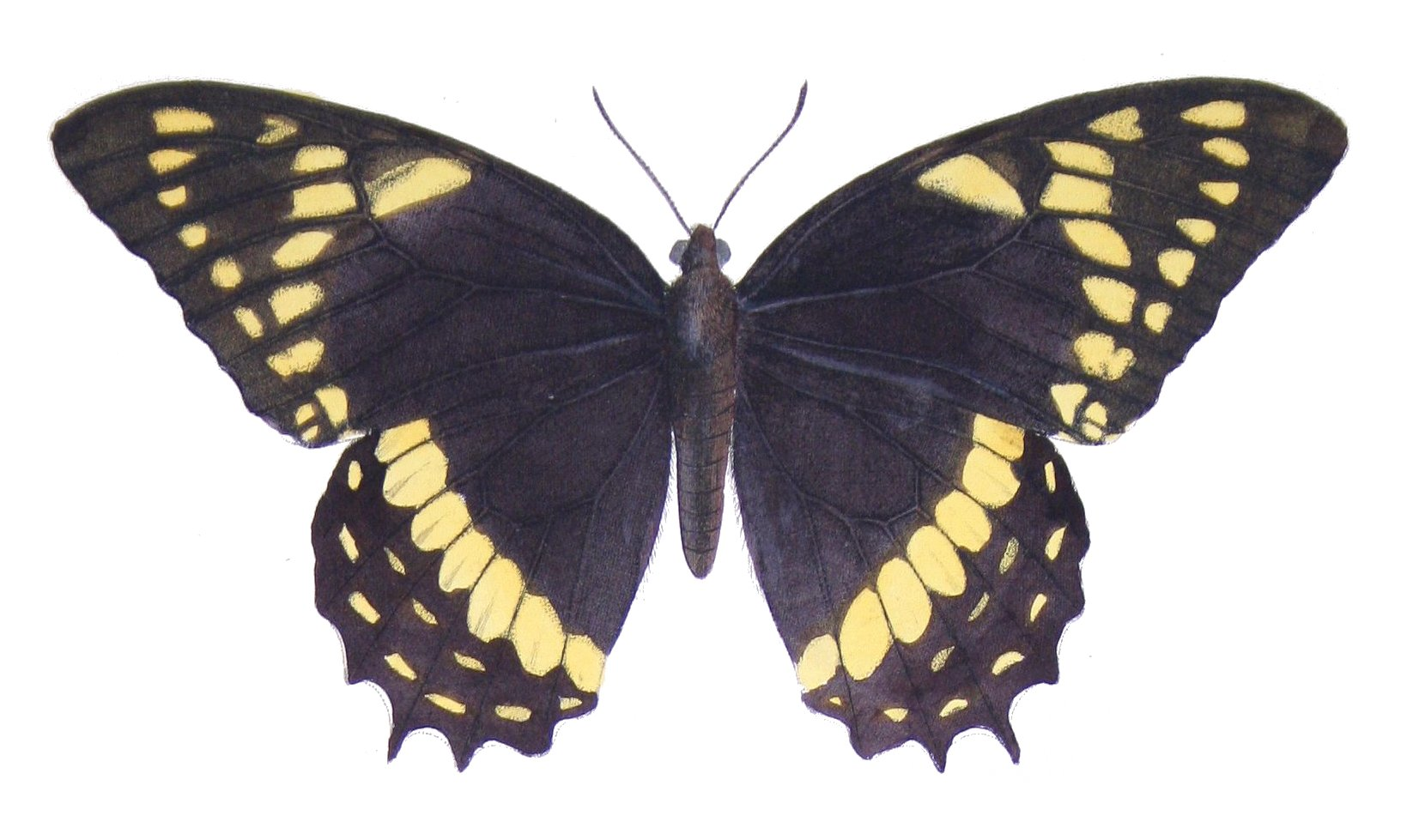
- P. m. syndemis
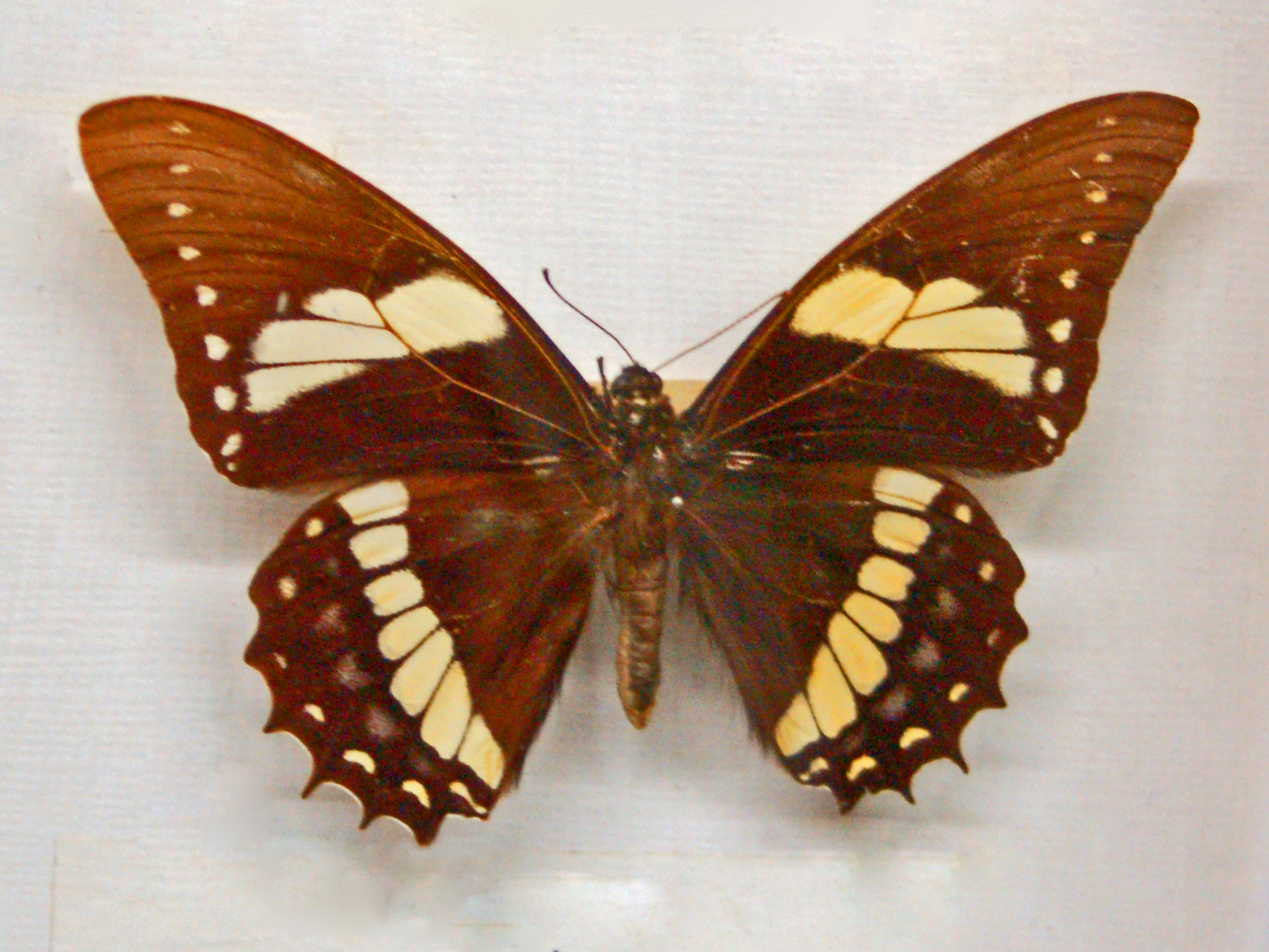
- P. m. lenaeus, at the National Museum in Prague

Scientific classification
- Kingdom: Animalia
- Phylum: Arthropoda
- Clade: Pancrustacea
- Class: Insecta
- Order: Lepidoptera
- Family: Papilionidae
- Genus: Papilio
- Species: P. menatius

Binomial name
- Papilio menatius (Hübner, [1819])

Synonyms
- Calaides menatius Hübner, [1819]; Pyrrhosticta menatius; Pterourus menatius; Papilio aristeus Stoll, [1781] (preocc. Stoll, 1780); Papilio coristheus Boisduval, 1836; Papilio felicis Strand, 1930; Papilio cleotas Gray, 1832; Papilio lycorta C. Felder & R. Felder, 1861; Papilio coroebus C. Felder & R. Felder, 1861; Papilio clearchus C. Felder & R. Felder, 1865; Papilio philocleon C. Felder & R. Felder, 1865; Pterourus coroebus; Papilio eurotas C. Felder & R. Felder, 1862; Papilio bitias Godart, 1819 (preocc. Cramer, 1777); Papilio ctesias C. Felder & R. Felder, 1865; Papilio lacordairei Borre, 1884; Papilio laetitia Butler, 1872; Papilio archytas Hopffer, 1866; Papilio phaëton Doubleday, [1845]; Papilio phaeton Lucas, [1859]; Papilio victorinus Doubleday, 1844; Papilio helleri C. Felder & R. Felder, 1864; Papilio amphissus Hopffer, 1866; Papilio vulneratus Butler, 1872

= Papilio menatius =

Species of butterfly

Papilio menatius is a butterfly of the family Papilionidae.

== Description ==
Papilio menatius is a large butterfly with a wingspan of about 95–110 millimetres (3.7–4.3 in). The uppersides of the wings are black with yellowish bands and yellowish submarginal lines of spots.

The subspecies P. m. menatius present in Guyana is black with white spots at the center of the forewings. On the hindwings there are a submarginal row of red lines and a line of spots partly red and partly white. Subspecies P. m. victorinus is treated as a species by some authors.

The larvae of P. m. victorinus feed on Persea americana. Adults feed on flower nectar of various plants, including Lantana and Impatiens species.

== Taxonomy ==
Papilio menatius is in the subgenus Pterourus Scopoli, 1777 which also includes the species groups: troilus species group, glaucus species group, the zagreus species group and the scamander species group. Papilio menatius is a member of the homerus species group. The members of this clade are:

- Papilio cacicus Lucas, 1852
- Papilio euterpinus Salvin & Godman, 1868
- Papilio garamas (Geyer, [1829])
- Papilio homerus Fabricius, 1793
- Papilio menatius (Hübner, [1819])
- Papilio warscewiczii Hopffer, 1865

and the enigmatic Papilio judicael known only from a handful of specimens and either a valid species from the Andean region, or a hybrid P. menatius × P. warscewiczii.

=== Subspecies ===
The following subspecies of Papilio menatius are recognised:

- P. m. menatius (Surinam, French Guiana)
- P. m. cleotas Gray, 1832 (Brazil (Santa Catarina, Rio de Janeiro) to Argentina)
- P. m. coelebs Rothschild & Jordan, 1906 (Peru)
- P. m. coroebus C. Felder & R. Felder, 1861 (Colombia, Venezuela)
- P. m. ctesiades Rothschild & Jordan, 1906 (Peru, Brazil (Amazonas, São Paulo))
- P. m. eurotas C. Felder & R. Felder, 1862 (Ecuador, Peru)
- P. m. laetitia Butler, 1872 (Costa Rica, Panama)
- P. m. lemoulti Rousseau-Decelle, 1933 (Venezuela)
- P. m. lenaeus Doubleday, 1846 (Bolivia, Peru)
- P. m. morelius Rothschild & Jordan, 1906 (western Mexico)
- P. m. syndemis (Tyler, Brown & Wilson, 1994) (Colombia)
- P. m. victorinus Doubleday, 1844 (eastern Mexico to Nicaragua) - victorine swallowtail
- P. m. vulneratus Butler, 1872 (Costa Rica)

== Distribution ==
This species can be found in southern North America and in most of South America (Mexico, Nicaragua, Costa Rica, Panama, Ecuador, Suriname, Guyana, Colombia, Bolivia, Venezuela, Argentina, Brazil and Peru).

== Gallery ==
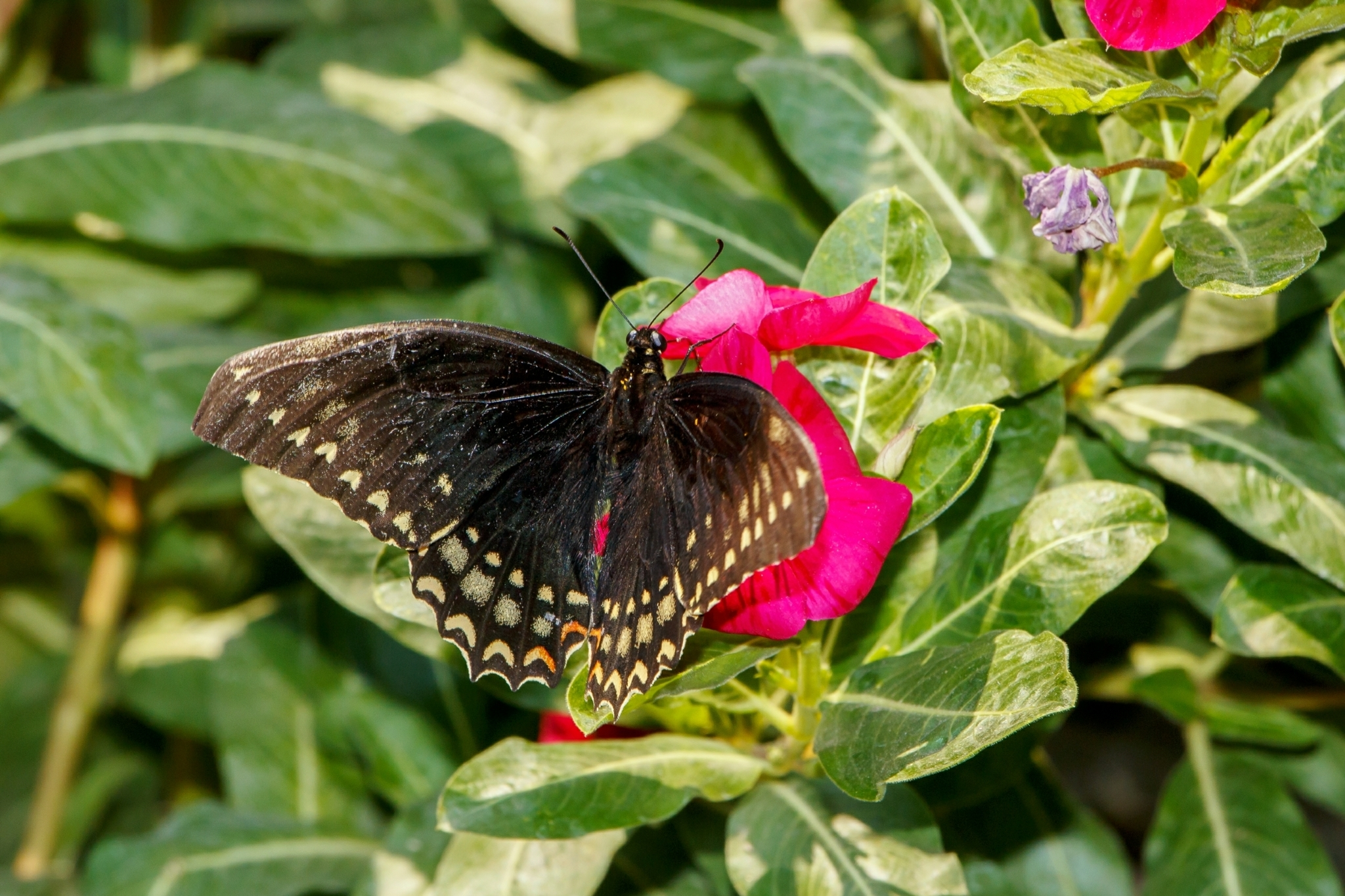
Papilio menatius ssp. morelius

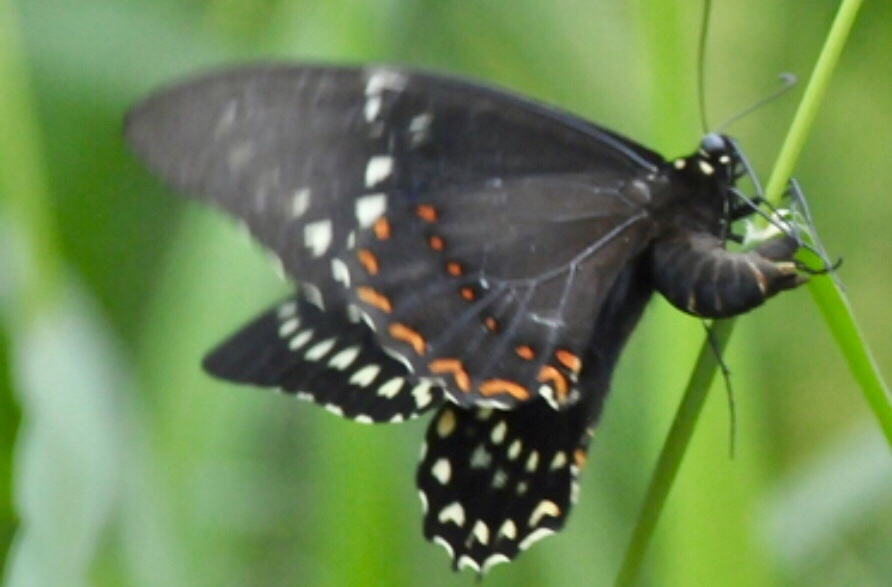
Papilio menatius ssp. victorinus
