= Papilio judicael =

Scientific classification (disputed)
- Kingdom: Animalia
- Phylum: Arthropoda
- Clade: Pancrustacea
- Class: Insecta
- Order: Lepidoptera
- Family: Papilionidae
- Genus: Papilio
- Species: P. judicael

Binomial name
- Papilio judicael Oberthür, 1888

Possible species or subspecies of butterfly

Papilio judicael is a South American disputed species or subspecies of butterfly in the genus Papilio. The species is very rare and not much information has been found on it. It is believed to be either a scarce and unique subspecies of Papilio menatius, or a hybrid of Papilio menatius lenaeus or Papilio menatius eurotas with Papilio warscewiczii. However, the most popular theory is it is a hybrid of Papilio menatius eurotas and Papilio warscewiczii mercedes. It is found in Peru and Bolivia.
