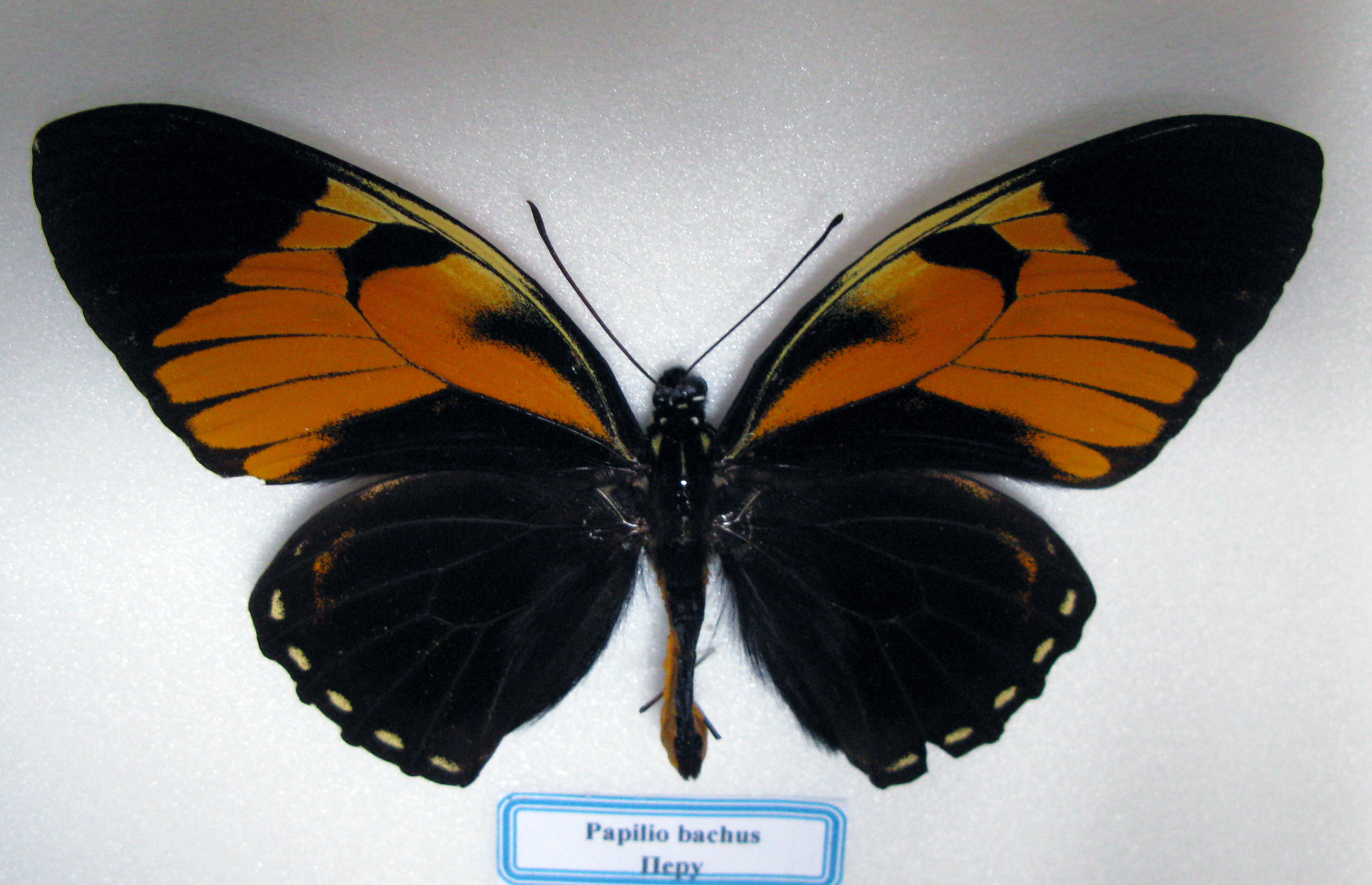

Scientific classification
- Kingdom: Animalia
- Phylum: Arthropoda
- Clade: Pancrustacea
- Class: Insecta
- Order: Lepidoptera
- Family: Papilionidae
- Genus: Papilio
- Species: P. bachus

Binomial name
- Papilio bachus C. & R. Felder, 1865

Synonyms
- Papilio oberthuri Apolinar, 1916; Pyrrhosticta bachus

= Papilio bachus =

Species of butterfly

Papilio bachus is a butterfly of the family Papilionidae. It is found in South America, including Colombia, Ecuador, Peru, and Bolivia.

Some authors consider it to be a subspecies of Papilio zagreus.

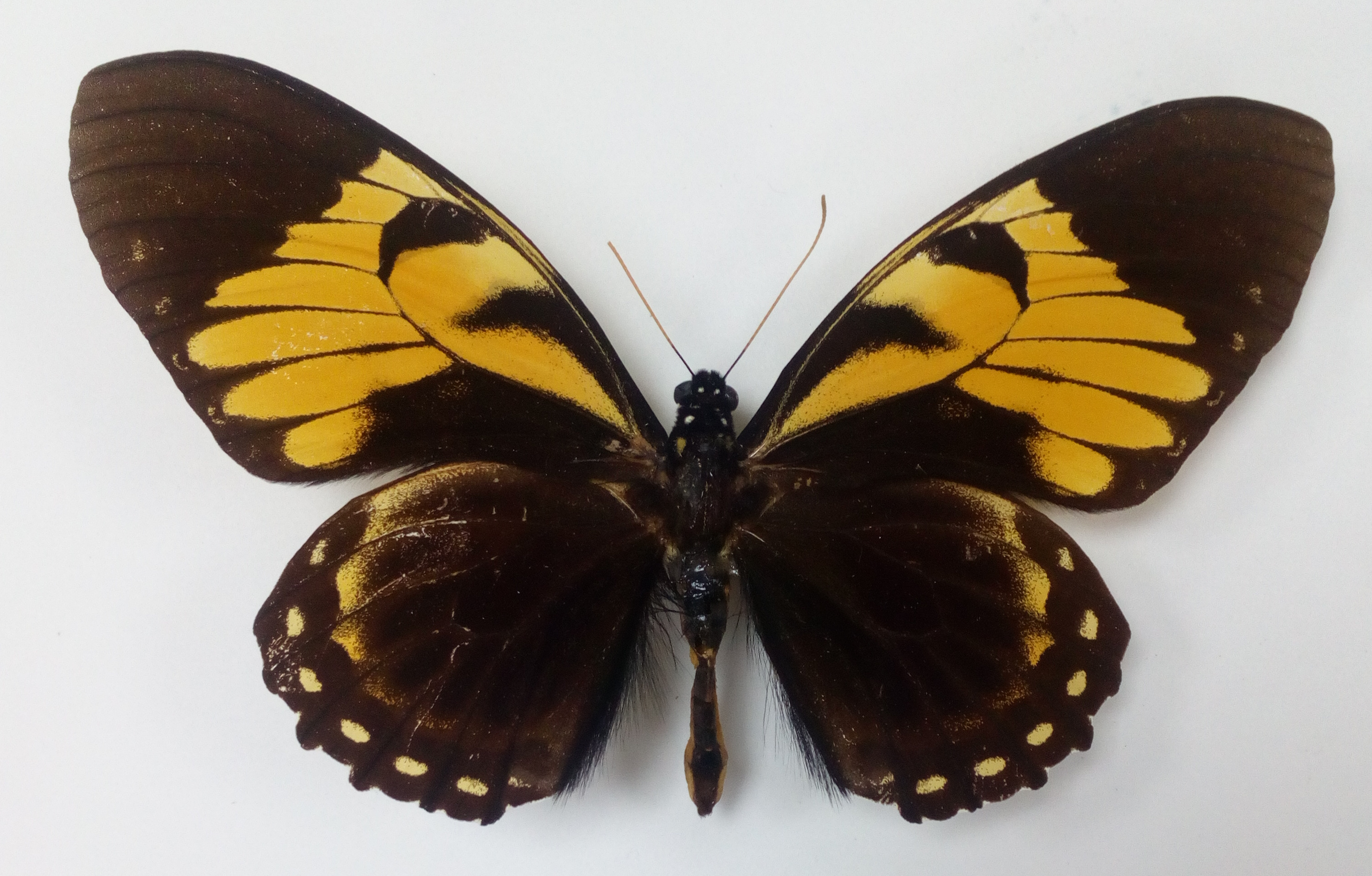

== Description in Seitz ==
P. bachus. The orange area of the hindwing of the preceding species [ascolius (zagreus) ssp.] is here only represented by a narrow variable band; however, the veins are often more or less yellowish on the underside. The female is not known. Colombia to Bolivia. Two subspecies. — bachus Fldr. (11c). The yellow spots of the forewing above and beneath quite pale, only the proximal cell-spot and the posterior discal spots somewhat orange. Colombia: found by Dr. Burger at the beginning of the rainy season in the Cordillera of Bogota; rare in collections. — chrysomelus R & J. The forewing orange above and beneath from the base to the disc, at the costal margin more or less pale yellow. Peru and Bolivia, not rare. From Ecuador no specimen of bachus has become known to us.

The wingspan is 110–130 mm.

== Subspecies ==
There are two recognised subspecies:

- Papilio bachus belsazar Niepelt, 1908
- Papilio bachus chrysomelus Rothschild & Jordan, 1906
