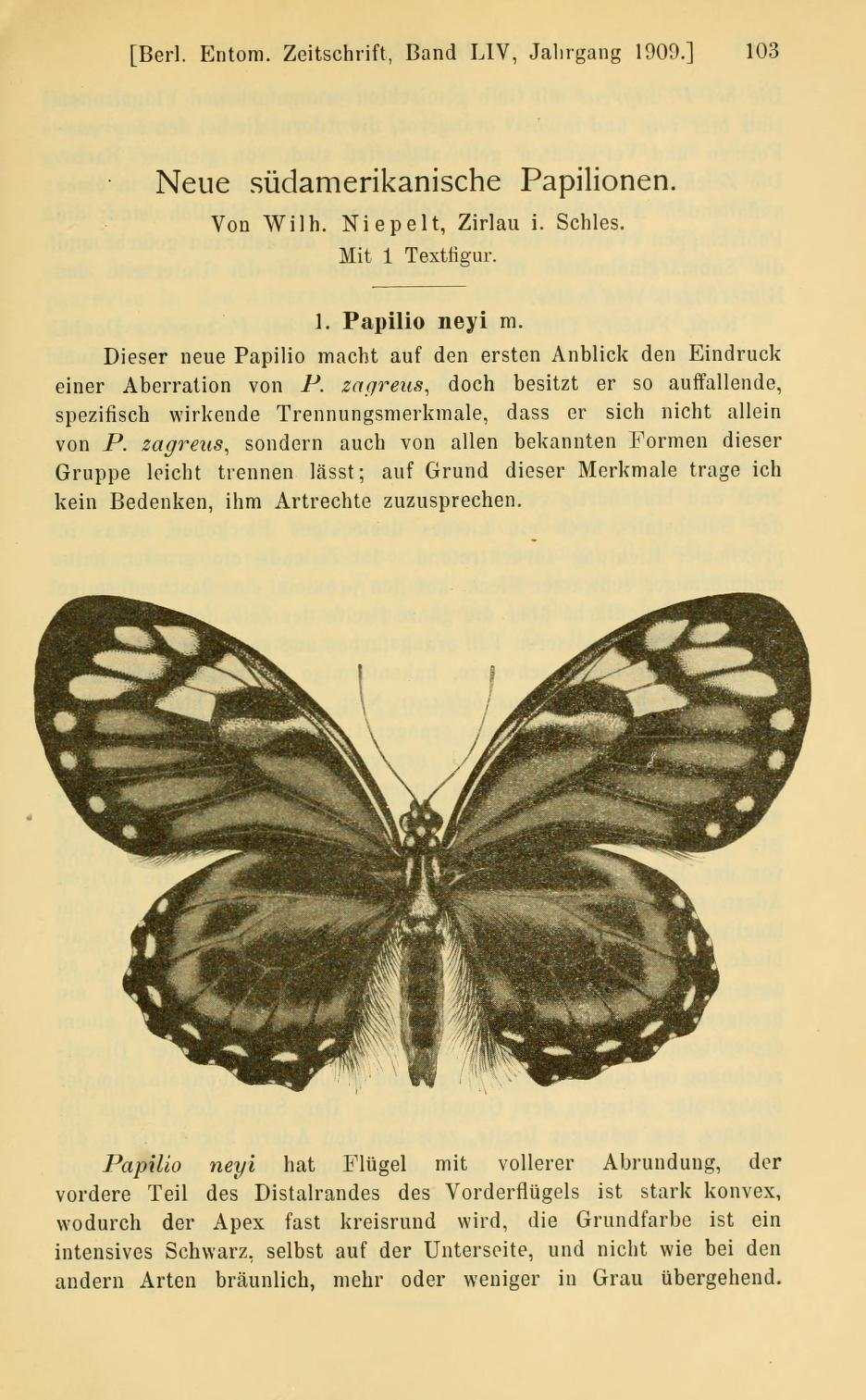
- Original description by Niepelt

Scientific classification
- Kingdom: Animalia
- Phylum: Arthropoda
- Clade: Pancrustacea
- Class: Insecta
- Order: Lepidoptera
- Family: Papilionidae
- Genus: Papilio
- Species: P. neyi

Binomial name
- Papilio neyi Niepelt, 1909

= Papilio neyi =

Species of butterfly

Papilio neyi is a species of swallowtail butterfly from the genus Papilio that is found in Ecuador, French Guiana, Peru and Brazil.

== Description ==
Papilio neyi is a large, brown butterfly with extensive orange markings and a submarginal line of creamy white spots and dots. The fore wings are adorned with large orange spots from the basal part to the submarginal line of cream spots which reserves the brown apex and the hind wings have a brown border marked or not with a submarginal line of cream dots and covered with confluent orange spots.

== Subspecies ==
- Papilio neyi neyi (Ecuador)
- Papilio neyi bedoci Le Cerf, 1925 (French Guiana)
- Papilio neyi josianae (Möhn, 2001) (Peru)

== Taxonomy ==
Papilio neyi is in the Papilio zagreus species group. This clade has two members.

- Papilio zagreus
- Papilio neyi (may be a form or subspecies of zagreus)
