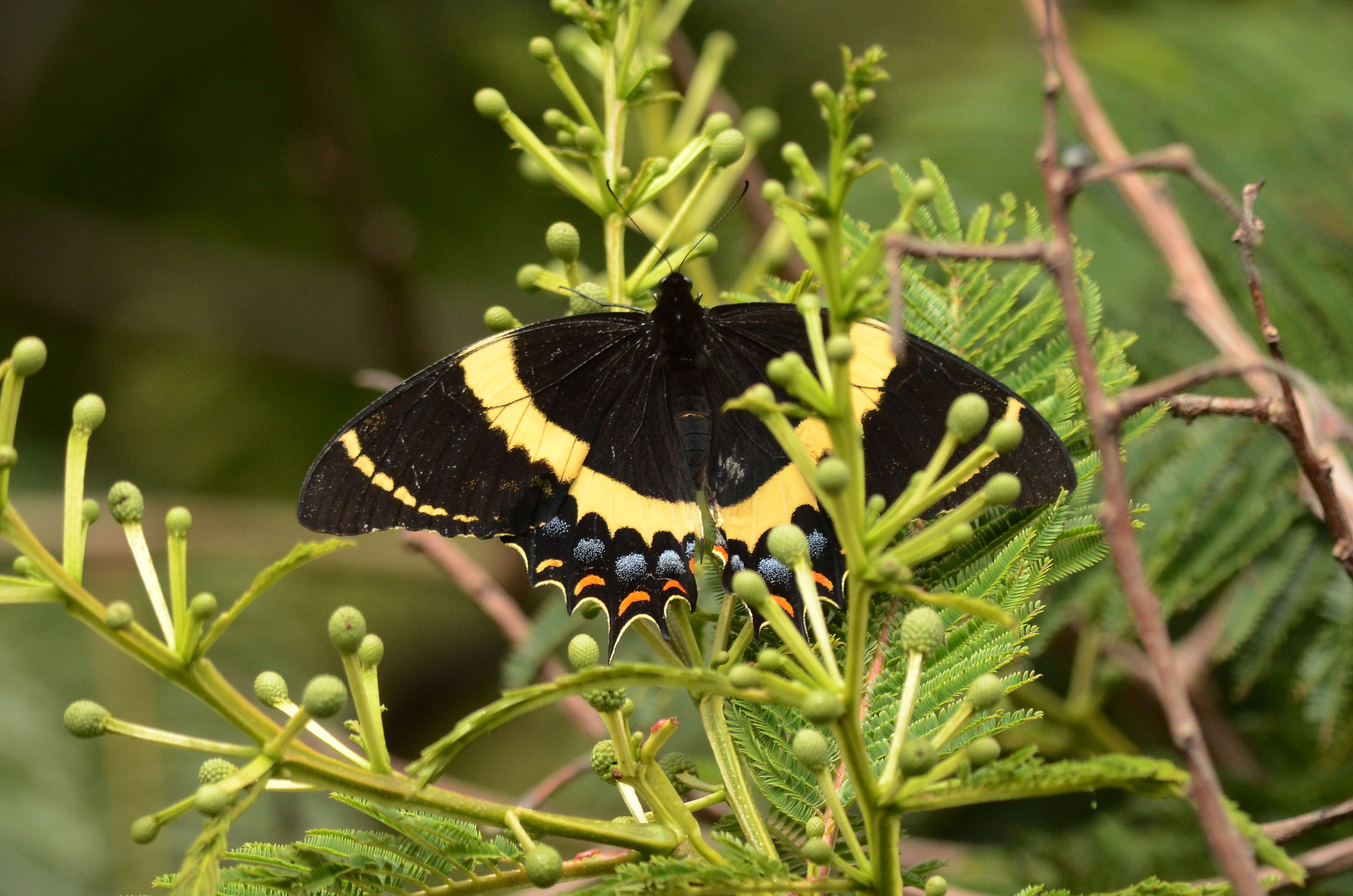
- P. g. garamas

Scientific classification
- Kingdom: Animalia
- Phylum: Arthropoda
- Clade: Pancrustacea
- Class: Insecta
- Order: Lepidoptera
- Family: Papilionidae
- Genus: Papilio
- Species: P. garamas

Binomial name
- Papilio garamas (Geyer, [1829])

Synonyms
- Euphoeades garamas Geyer, [1829]; Heraclides asclepius Geyer, [1829]; Papilio cincinnatus Boisduval, 1836; Papilio garamas garamas f. amisa Rothschild & Jordan, 1906; Papilio garamas ab. homeroides Draudt, 1931; Papilio garamas f. splendida Beutelspacher, 1976; Papilio garamas f. ampliata Beutelspacher, 1976; Papilio garamas ab. diazi Beutelspacher, 1976; Papilio abderus Hopffer, 1856; Papilio abderus f. amerias Rothschild & Jordan, 1906; Papilio electryon Bates, 1864; Papilio syedra Godman & Salvin, 1878; Papilio abderus baroni f. morenoi de la Maza, 1977

= Papilio garamas =

Magnificent swallowtail

Species of butterfly

Papilio garamas, commonly known as the mexico phoenix or magnificent swallowtail, is a species of Neotropical swallowtail butterfly found in Mexico, Guatemala, Honduras, Panama and Costa Rica.

== Description ==
A large butterfly with a wingspan of 80 to 110 millimetres. The females are dimorphic, either resembling the male or dark forms lacking the cream median and postdiscal bands, contrasting with deep black ground colour.

== Subspecies ==
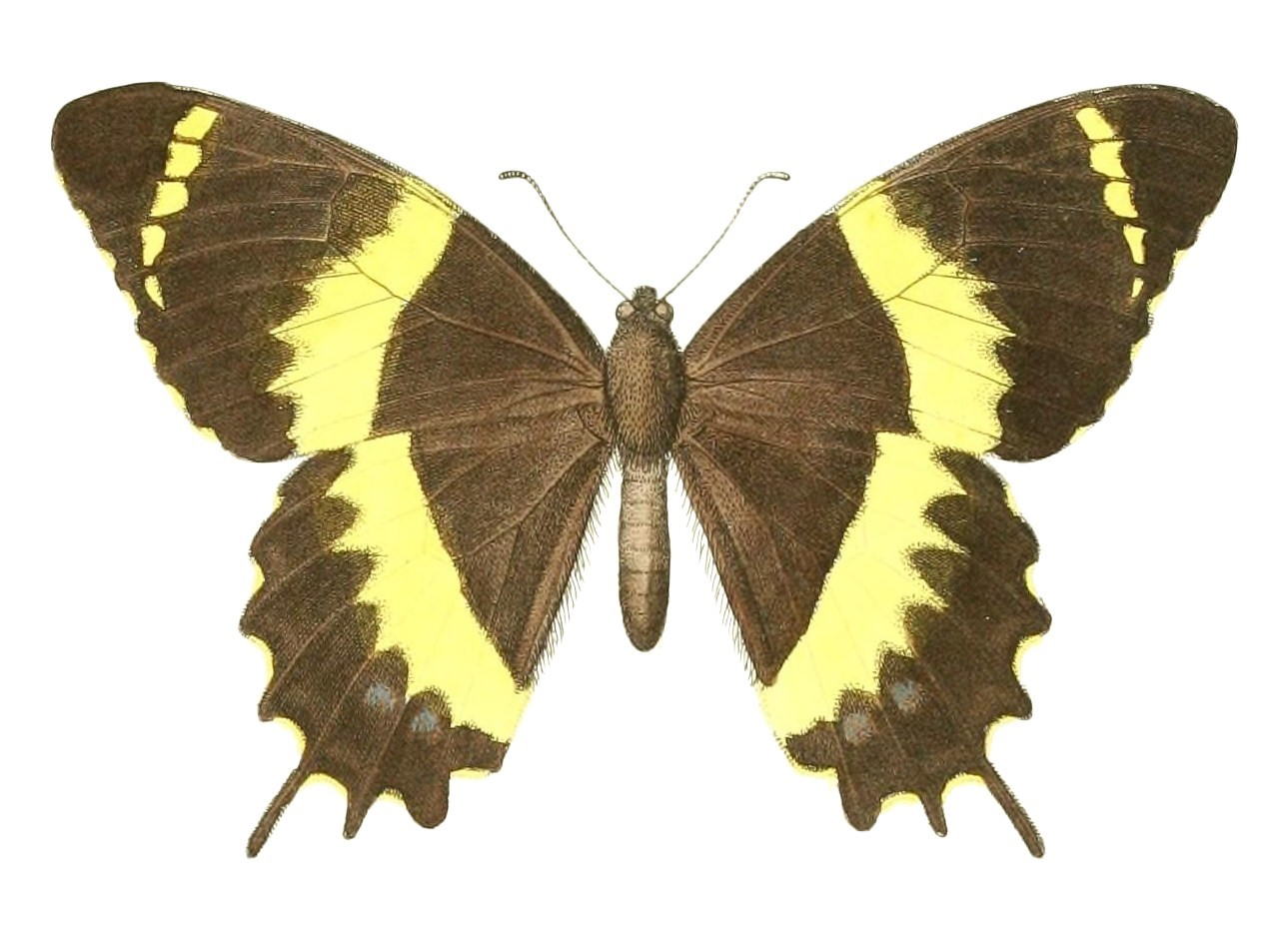
Papilio garamas abderus

- Papilio garamas garamas Geyer, 1829 (central Mexico)
- Papilio garamas tapatio De la Maza, 2023 (western Mexico)
- Papilio garamas abderus Hopffer, 1856 (eastern Mexico) generally seen as conspecific with P. garamas but sometimes treated as a distinct species (Collins & Morris 1985:87, Hancock 1983, Llorente-Bousquets et al. 1997).
- Papilio garamas electryon Bates, 1864 (Guatemala to Honduras) may be placed in abderus
- Papilio garamas syedra Godman & Salvin, 1878 (Panama, Costa Rica) may be placed in abderus
- Papilio garamas baroni Rothschild & Jordan, 1906 (southwestern Mexico) may be placed in abderus

== Taxonomy ==
Papilio garamas is a member of the homerus species group. The members of this clade are:

- Papilio cacicus Lucas, 1852
- Papilio euterpinus Salvin & Godman, 1868
- Papilio garamas (Geyer, [1829])
- Papilio homerus Fabricius, 1793
- Papilio menatius (Hübner, [1819])
- Papilio warscewiczii Hopffer, 1865

Papilio garamas is in the subgenus Pterourus Scopoli, 1777 which also includes the species groups: troilus species group, glaucus species group, the zagreus species group and the scamander species group.

== Status ==
Not uncommon and not regarded as threatened. If the garamas subspecies other than garamas garamas are subspecies of abderus then garamas is a Mexican endemic, but a taxonomic clarification is required.

== Etymology ==
Garamas was the son of Acacallis (Greek: Ἀκακαλλίς) in Greek mythology.
