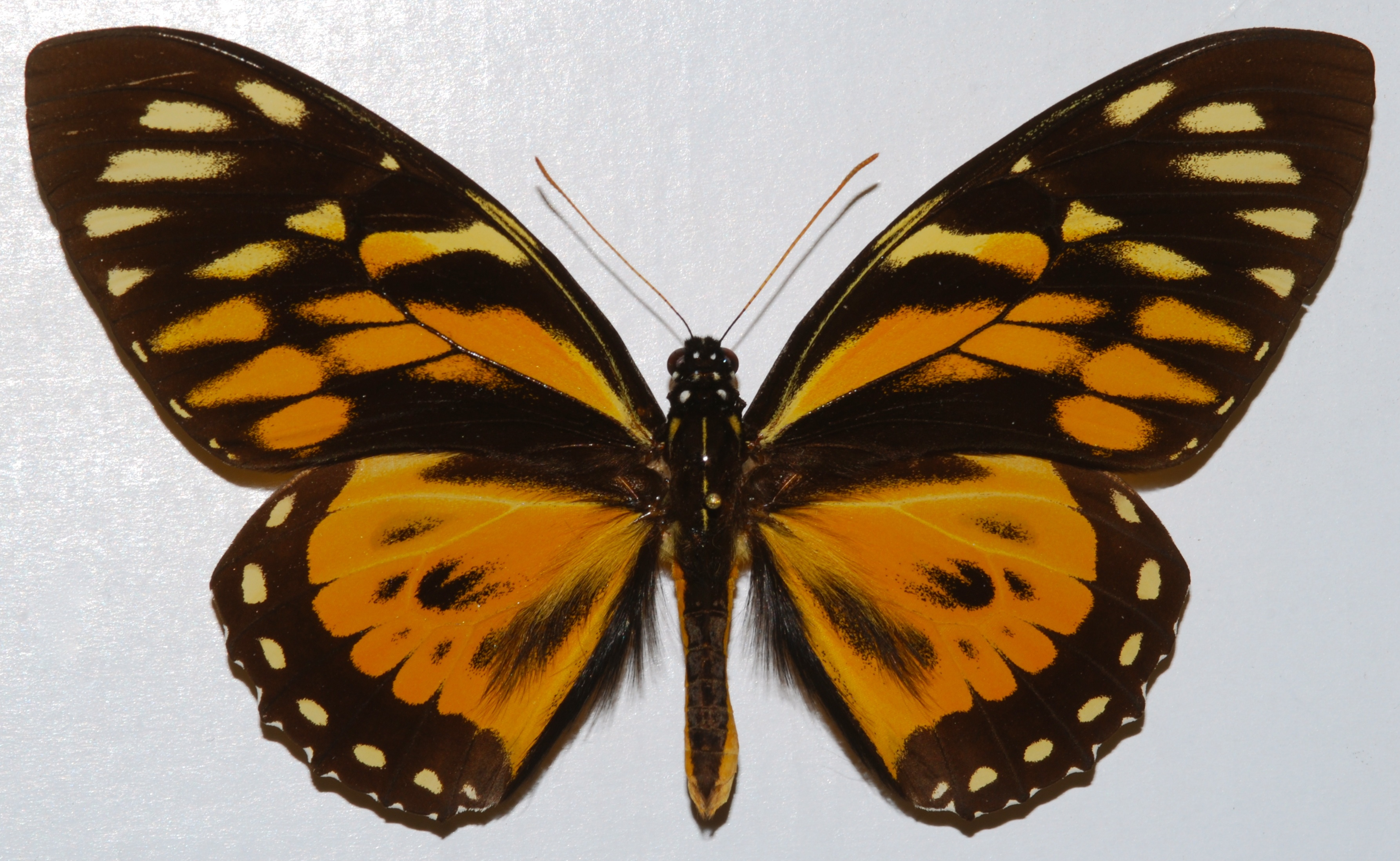

Scientific classification
- Kingdom: Animalia
- Phylum: Arthropoda
- Clade: Pancrustacea
- Class: Insecta
- Order: Lepidoptera
- Family: Papilionidae
- Genus: Papilio
- Species: P. zagreus

Binomial name
- Papilio zagreus Doubleday, 1847

Synonyms
- Papilio zagreus; Pyrrhosticta zagreus; Pterourus zagreus; Papilio ascolius C. & R. Felder, 1865 Ranked as a species in Collins and Morris (1985); Pyrrhosticta ascolius; Papilio zalates Godman & Salvin, [1890]; Papilio zimmermanni Ehrmann, 1921

= Papilio zagreus =

Species of butterfly

Papilio zagreus is a butterfly of the family Papilionidae (swallowtails). It is found in South America, including Venezuela, Colombia, Ecuador, Peru, Bolivia and western Brazil.

== Description ==
A powerfully built insect with strong neuration in the forewing. The frons is either quite black or bears a yellow mesial line, never a yellow lateral streak along the eye. The antennae are long, yellow, with thin club; the frons has a yellow mesial stripe, the breast is diagonally streaked with yellow, the abdomen is for the most part yellow, the costal margin of the forewing is not dentate, the cell of the forewing is broad and the hindwing is rounded, without a tail. The spots of the forewing orange, the marginal ones yellow; hindwing orange, a marginal band enclosing a yellow submarginal spot, a basal subcostal area, a patch in the extremity of the cell, as well as several spots on the disc, black.

The wingspan is 110–130 mm.

== Biology ==
Papilio zagreus is a palatable Batesian mimic of various Heliconius butterfly species.

== Subspecies ==
- Papilio zagreus zagreus (Colombia, Venezuela, Amazonas to Bolivia)
- Papilio zagreus ascolius C. & R. Felder, 1864 (Ecuador, Colombia, Panama) Hindwing without black spots in the cell and on the disc, basal area of the cell of the forewing always pure pale yellow, between the 3. radial and 1. median two spots touching the cell: cell of the hindwing and the adjoining parts of the disc orange. Batesian mimic of various Ithomiini.
- Papilio zagreus bachus C. & R. Felder, 1865 (Colombia, Ecuador) The orange area of the hindwing of the preceding subspecies is here only represented by a narrow variable band: however, the veins are often more or less yellowish on the underside.
- Papilio zagreus zalates Godman & Salvin, 1890 (Panama, Nicaragua, Costa Rica) The most northern form. The cell area of the forewing is dusted with black, the subapical cell-spot is narrow, the discal spots are short, the marginal area of the hindwing narrower than in the other forms and the hindwing beneath deeper orange.
- Papilio zagreus rosenbergi Druce, 1903 (Ecuador) The subapical cell-spot of the forewing large, the discal spot between the 1. and 2. radial usually small, sometimes absent, rarely large, the following discal spots on the whole larger than in the preceding forms, whilst the posterior submarginal spots are smaller. Named for the London-based insect dealer W.F.M. Rosenberg.
- Papilio zagreus chrysomelus Rothschild & Jordan, 1906 (Peru, Bolivia, Ecuador) The forewing orange above and beneath from the base to the disc, at the costal margin more or less pale yellow.
- Papilio zagreus daguanus Rothschild & Jordan, 1906 (Colombia) The cell-spot of the forewing as in zalates, the discal spots on the contrary as in ascolius, the discal spot between the 1. and 2. radial much shorter than the one placed behind it; hindwing pale, much less orange than in ascolius, the black basal streak broad, entering the cell, behind this streak a large black spot on the disc.
- Papilio zagreus batesi (Racheli & Racheli, 1996) (northern Peru)
- Papilio zagreus chrysoxanthus Fruhstorfer, 1915 (central Peru, southern Peru to Bolivia)
- Papilio zagreus nigroapicalis (Bollino & Sala, 1998) (Peru)
- Papilio zagreus baueri (Möhn, 2001) (Amazonas)

== Taxonomy ==
Papilio zagreus is in the Papilio zagreus species group. This clade has two members.

- Papilio zagreus
- Papilio neyi (may be a form of zagreus)

P.ascolius is ranked as a species in earlier works. The status was changed to subspecies by Racheli and Parise in 1992 and this was accepted by Tyler, Brown and Wilson in 1994.
