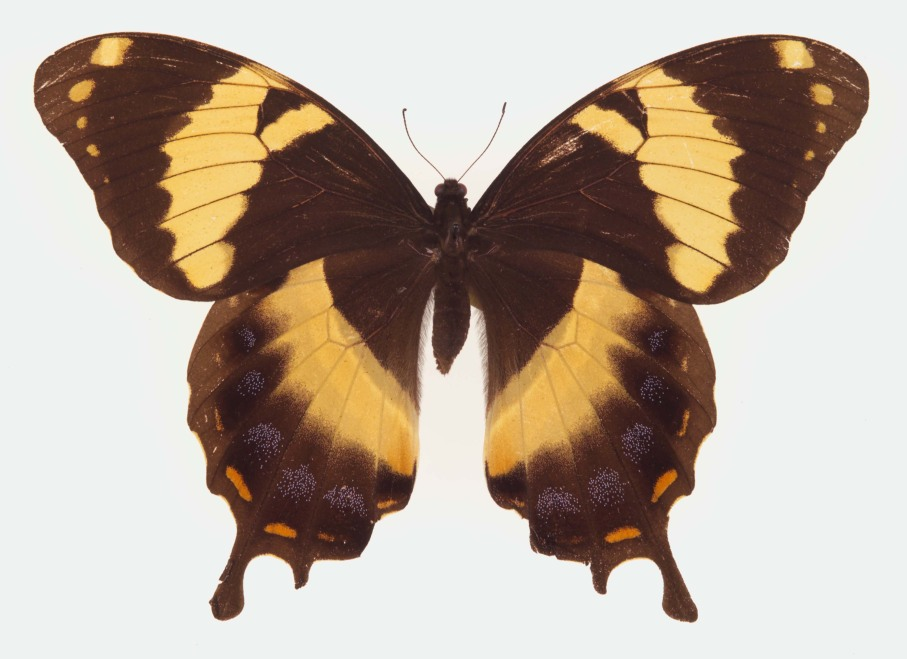

Conservation status
- Endangered (IUCN 3.1)
- CITES Appendix I

Scientific classification
- Kingdom: Animalia
- Phylum: Arthropoda
- Clade: Pancrustacea
- Class: Insecta
- Order: Lepidoptera
- Family: Papilionidae
- Genus: Papilio
- Species: P. homerus

Binomial name
- Papilio homerus Fabricius, 1793

= Papilio homerus =

Homerus swallowtail

Species of butterfly

Papilio homerus, commonly known as the Homerus swallowtail or Jamaican swallowtail, is the largest butterfly species in the Western Hemisphere. The species is endangered and faces a potentially bleak future. Only two small populations of the Homerus swallowtail remain in a fraction of their original environment. It is endemic to Jamaica where the butterfly simultaneously serves as an icon of national pride and a need for conservation efforts. Over the past half century, the Jamaican swallowtail has been featured on various postal stamps and the Jamaican $1000 bill. In the face of rapid habitat destruction from human disruption and illegal collecting, the Jamaican swallowtail is listed on the Threatened Swallowtail Butterflies of the World by the International Union for Conservation of Nature (Red List) and is protected under international and national level legislation.

The butterfly is named in honor of the Greek poet Homer. The adult butterfly has been described by researchers as "gigantic and magnificent." Females are larger than males and can have a wingspan of 15 cm (6 in). Adults can be seen from morning to afternoon soaring among the canopy of the Neotropical Jamaican rainforests. Its brown-black wings feature a large yellow band and blue and red spotting, making the butterfly easy to spot from far away.

Given the low population and the intense terrain in its forested habitats, few studies of the Jamaican swallowtails have aided to construct a basic biological and ecological understanding of the species. Additionally, very little is known about the swallowtail's behavior. Researchers who study the species all agree that further study is needed to inform and promote an effective conservation strategy for the survival of the butterfly.

== Taxonomy and phylogeny ==
The family Papiliondae has the greatest diversity in the tropics, where P. homerus is found. Morphological analysis reveals that P. garamas (a smaller swallowtail endemic to Central America) and P. homerus share a recent common ancestor. The butterflies may have island-hopped between Honduras and Jamaica during the Last Glacial Maximum of the Late Pleistocene when sea levels were lowest, Jamaica closer to the mainland, and more islands existed between them.

P. homerus is the largest butterfly in the genus Papilio, a heavily lumped taxon which contains four subgenera, most of which themselves consist of a number of species groups that have at various times been given their own generic status.

Within Papilio, P. homerus and P. garamas are sister species within the Neotropical Homerus species group of the mostly New World Pterourus subgenus. Other member of Pterourus are the mostly Nearctic North American Troilus and Glaucus clades, and the exclusively South American Zagreus and Scamander clades. Only Homerus contains species within Central America and the Greater Antilles, as well as being the only group with distribution in both North and South America.

== Geographic range and habitat ==
P. homerus is endemic to Jamaica, which is located in the Neotropical realm. It previously occupied half of the 14 parishes of Jamaica but can only be found as two or three small populations today. While many researchers have previously claimed that there are only two remaining strongholds, one author argues that there are three distinct populations: a central, eastern, and western population.

=== Central population ===
The Central population has most likely disappeared. The last observation of P. homerus in this region was in 1925. This is also the least understood of the three populations. The region that they had inhabited consists of plateaus at an elevation of 600 to 1,000 m (2,000–3,300 ft). The population was located centrally around Mt. Diablo, which is located 70 km from both of the other populations. Thus, this population likely served as a key means of allowing gene flow between the three populations to prevent genetic bottlenecking, the genetic isolation of a subset of any given population.

The population has been lost to anthropogenic habitat disruption. With deforestation and the expansion of developments bordering much of the remaining forest land, the climate of the region is more arid. This less than 100% humidity results in developmental defects in pupae reared in the lab. The disappearance of this population poses an ecological threat to the stability of the remaining two populations.

=== Western population ===
Located in the mountainous and cave-filled Cockpit Country, this population is in less danger of human interference due to difficulty of the terrain. The geography, coupled with the privatization of land by marijuana farmers has made the population more difficult to access and thus study. There is known less precipitation here than compared to the geography occupied by the Eastern population. A small population can be found on Pitfour Boulevard, outside the Nyahbinghi Rastafarian Centre in Pitfour just outside Montego Bay.

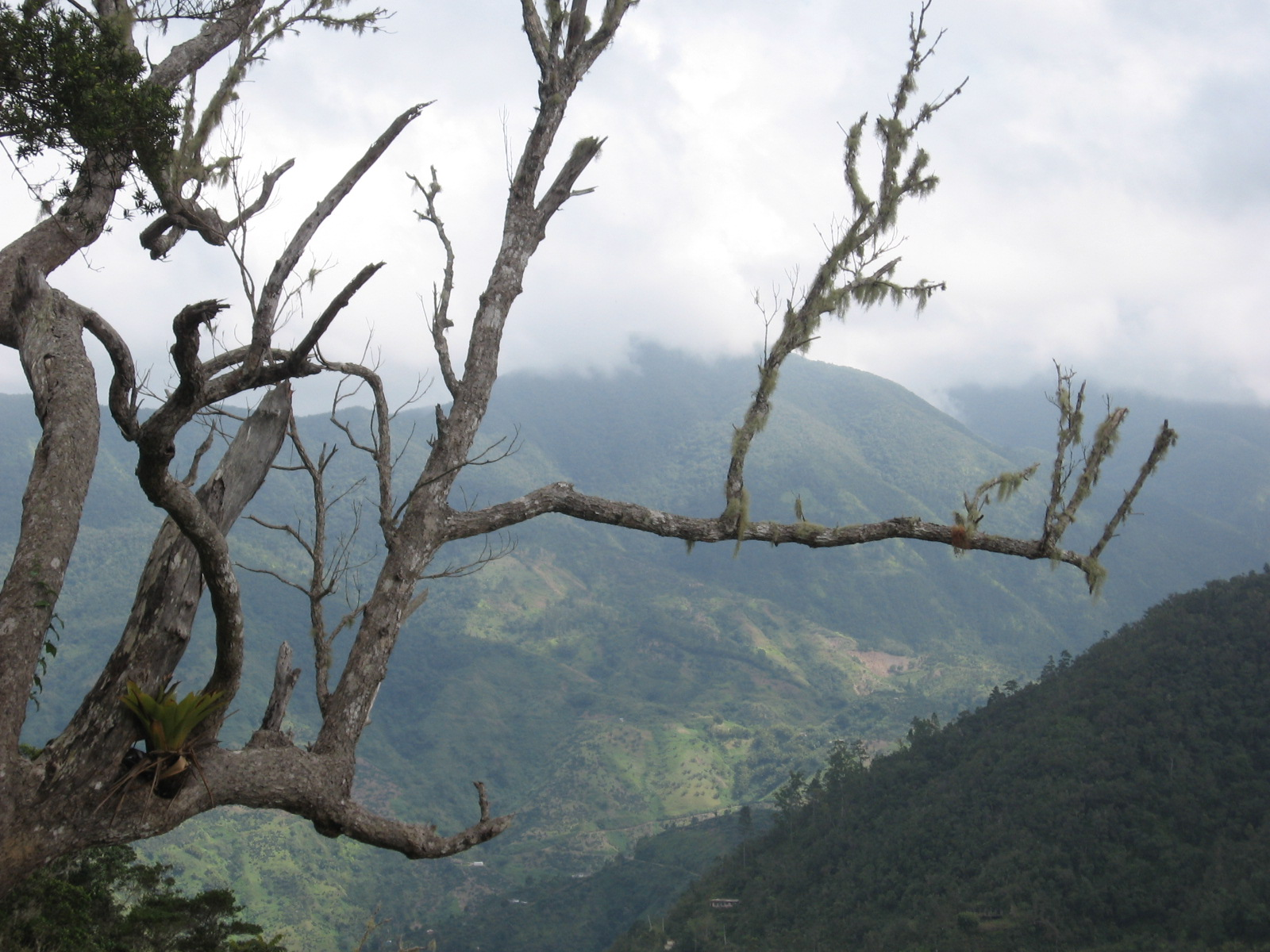
Blue Mountains

=== Eastern population ===
This is the most well-studied of the three populations. This population occupies the region where the Blue Mountains and the John Crow Mountains meet. The area is ideal of Papilio homerus, with abundant host plants and high levels of rain, leading to a regular high humidity.

== Life cycle ==
=== Eggs ===
Upon oviposition, the eggs of P. homerus are smooth, spherical, and white measuring 1.5-2.0 mm in diameter. The eggs are deposited onto the leaves of a host plant where they turn from light green to yellow and eventually to dark brown before hatching.

=== Larvae ===
The first and second instar of the larvae resemble bird droppings, with a dark brown body and a white lower abdominal region. This is thought to provide a selective advantage as to avoid predation. Lasting five days, the first instar is 9mm in length and has bristles along the body. The second instar has diminished bristles and grows to 15mm in length. This second instar also develops an enlarged thoracic region. The second instar lasts five days. The third instar displays eyespots on the thoracic segment and reaches a length of 26mm. The third instar lasts 9 days. The larvae take on a green appearance in the fourth instar. In this stage, the thoracic segments are swollen and display colored eyespots. This instar grows to 40mm and lasts ten days. The fifth instar resembles the fourth but has more intense coloration. The green color and the eyespots may also reduce predation.

All larvae have osmeteria, appearing pink in the first three instars and a brighter red in the last two instars. This defensive organ, found in all papilionid larvae, resembles the forked tongue of a snake and may serve to scare off potential predators. They are only displayed when the larvae are provoked, which lead previous researchers to report that the larvae do not have osmeteria when they do in fact have them.

=== Pupae ===
Pupae appear to be dark gray, brown and green, or brown. All forms of pupae also display several white spots. Pupae measure upwards of 40mm in length and 18.5mm in maximum width. Pupae have been observed on the branches of the Hernandia plant and on the branch of a fern in the field. The pupal stage lasts from 10 to 14 days.

=== Adults ===
The dorsal side of the adult wing is dark brown with a bright yellow band on both wings. The large broad, rounded hind wing also has powder-blue spots on it. The ventral surface is also dark brown and has a less intense band of yellow.

Male and female adults generally have the same coloration and patterning, but differ in key aspects. Females are larger than males. Females also have brighter coloration of the blue and yellow features. Adults are estimated to only live a few weeks in the field and have been able to survive six days in the laboratory setting.

== Host plants ==
Adults are known to feed on various nectar sources such as L. camara, H. rosasinensis, including endemic Jamaican species such as Hernandia catalpaefolia and H. jamaicensis. Both sexes have been observed feeding on nectar, suggesting that P. homerus are opportunistic flower feeders. There are no reports of the species feeding on other food sources.

=== Larval food plant ===
Although, H. catalpaefolia and H. jamaicensis have been known to be the host-plants, the access to these plants now seem to be restricted. Currently, there is no confirmed larval food plant species known. However, oviposition has been observed on Ocotea species plants that are found in all three geographies known to have recently been occupied by the populations of Jamaican swallowtail.

== Larval behavior ==
New larvae hatch from the egg, consume the chorion, and feed on the leaf of oviposition. They are typically found alone, but can share the same leaf with upwards of five other larvae. When the larvae reach the fourth instar, they move onto other, younger leaves to feed. Larvae have also been observed drinking water droplets after heavy rains.

== Adult behavior ==
The Jamaican swallowtail can be spotted during the daylight hours of nine in the morning to two in the afternoon. In the morning, the butterfly can be seen basking in the sunlight atop trees and shrubs. They can also be observed feeding on nectars of various flowers. Adult Jamaican swallowtails can soar at high elevations (up to 550m) rapidly gliding along wind current. Adults are observably active during all months, but with lowest activity from November to March.

Females can be seen gliding closer to the leaves, searching for food and places for oviposition. Females lay eggs on the upper surface of young leaves and do not lay clutches, but rather single eggs. Upwards of four eggs on a single leaf have been observed, with eggs being most commonly observed on leaves that are one to three meters off the forest floor.

Males can be seen soaring along the canopy engaging in territorial behavior.

=== Migration ===
Adult butterflies may be found soaring and gliding from the hours of 8am to 4pm daily. While the occurrence of a daily migration pattern is still not fully understood by researchers, one report of daily migration exists. Lehnert reports that there is a daily vertical migration in which adults descend from the mountain tops to just above the river beds. This migration occurs from 1pm to 3pm. However, daily migration has not been observed or recorded since the initial observation in the literature.

Lehnert also notes the seasonal migration that was observed during his field visits. Adults can be found in the cooler mountain tops from April to August of every year. When the temperature falls below 67 °F, adults descend into the lower regions of the mountains where food sources are more abundant and temperature is generally higher. The seasonal vertical migration is about 1000 feet in altitude.

=== Male-male competition ===
Male Jamaican swallowtails engage in territorial conflict encounters. A territory consists of a clearing in the forest with an abundance of nectar-providing plants. Adult males typically surveil the area by circling the territory along the canopy every 15 minutes. In this species, males engage in physical encounters when challenged to a territorial dispute. During these flights, the resident male would begin to pursue an invading male. Disputing Lepedoptera have displayed three distinct behaviors; the P. homerus engages more commonly in a horizontal spiraling pursuit. The encounter between competing males would last an average of 20 minutes. The resident male prevails as the victor of these disputes in 78% of observations. Substantial wing damage may occur in males due to these aggressive interactions.

== Mating ==
Only one observation of mating in the wild has been recorded to date. The instance, recorded by Garraway, involved a male and female pair rested in tandem to one another. They remained in the position for 25 minutes before taking off in flight, with the male following the female into the foliage of the rainforest. The pair was spotted resting on the leaf of a common bamboo tree. The duration of the actual mating activity remains unknown as no start time was observed or recorded for the mating. Further, no recorded observation of courtship behavior exists in the literature.

== Parasitoids and predators ==
A parasitoid is an organism that spends a considerable period of its life history within a host organism. Parasitoid infection leads to host death due to the exploitation of the host body for the growth and development of the parasitoid.

A study in 1992 found the parasitoid infection rate of eggs was 77%. This poses a major threat to the stability of the remaining populations. The two most common parasitoid species are an encyrtid (Ooencytrus sp.) and a eulophid (Chrysonotomyta sp.). However, other forms of egg mortality exist, including predation by ants and fungal infections.

Bacterial pathogenesis, detrimental bacterial infection, is the leading cause of death of larvae. Predation from birds, insects, and lizards has also been observed among larvae and adults.

Due to the size and beauty of the butterfly, poaching has also threatened the remaining populations of the Jamaican swallowtail. However, increased awareness and legal protection have significantly reduced the amount of illegal collection.

== Conservation ==
=== Population estimates ===
Lehnert estimated the size of the eastern population at less than 50 adult individuals. This estimation was done using a mark and recapture procedure. There has been no attempted size estimate of the other populations.

A regressive analysis of historical data of the observation of P. homerus indicates that there is no decline in the number of adults found in the wild. However, population size is still facing the great threat of habitat loss, destruction, and climate change.

The sex ratio developed from field observations indicate a male bias. However, laboratory reared P. homerus indicate that the sex ratio is most likely 1:1. The bias seen in the field is likely due to sample bias, as it is easier for males to be spotted and captured due to their behavior of soaring above and patrolling territories.

=== Species status ===
Given the small number of adults left and the dwindling habitat, the species is considered and protected as a threatened species in various ways. The species is listed in the IUCN Red Data Book. Further, it is legally protected under Appendix I of the Convention on International Trade in Endangered Species (CITES) and the Jamaican Wildlife Act of 1998.

=== Conservation efforts ===
Along with the legal protections by the regulatory entities mentioned previously, conservation efforts are being promoted by biologists to protect the remaining population of the species. Jamaica has expanded the National Park system to include the habitats of the two populations, further protecting the habitat from destruction by human developments.

Lehnert outlines a substantial conservation plan. Components of the conservation efforts include further research to develop more comprehensive population size estimates and population dynamics. Lehnert advocates for further study of the habitat and ecological threats in order to understand how to provide adequate space and protection for the species. Finally, Lehnert advocates for the establishment of a refugium population of the butterfly that could be reared in a controlled environment and reintroduced into the field. This, paired with continued efforts to boost local awareness of the species and its status, may help in creating more stable and present population of P. homerus in its native land.

=== Habitat loss and destruction ===
Habitat loss is a major concern due to rapid changes that have occurred in the Jamaican landscape. While the deforestation rate is at 0.1%, presents as an imminent threat as the Jamaican government has planted monocrops of fast growing pines while uprooting native, pre-existing rainforests to meet the fuel demands of the region.

Habitat destruction has occurred most dramatically among the central population of the Jamaican swallowtail. Human development leads to a change in the local atmosphere, including a decrease in humidity. Deforestation paired with construction and development bordering the rainforest has contributed to the eradication of the population.

In the Eastern and Western populations, habitat destruction is not presenting as direct of a threat to the stability of the populations. The Eastern population has little human development and the few developments are not withstanding, with heavy rains destroying recently established farms. The Western population is protected by marijuana farmers illegally disallowing local traffic and the difficulty of the terrain in which it is located.
