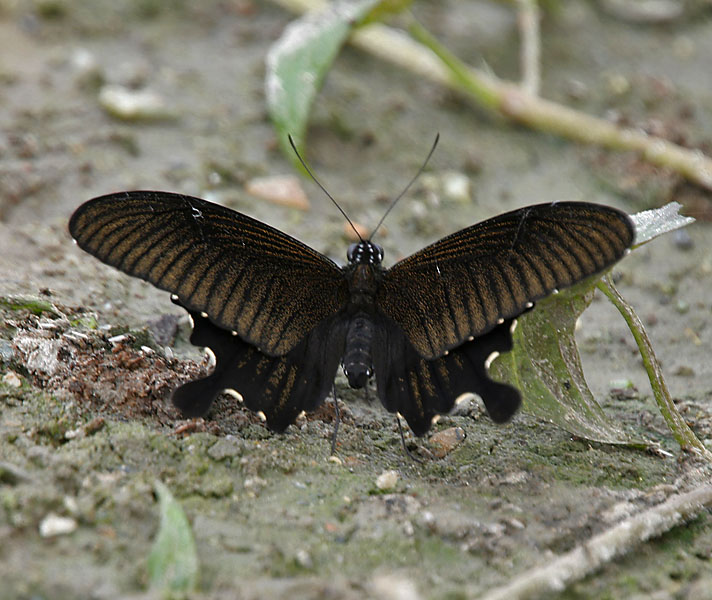
- P. n. chaon at Jayanti in Buxa Tiger Reserve in Jalpaiguri district of West Bengal, India
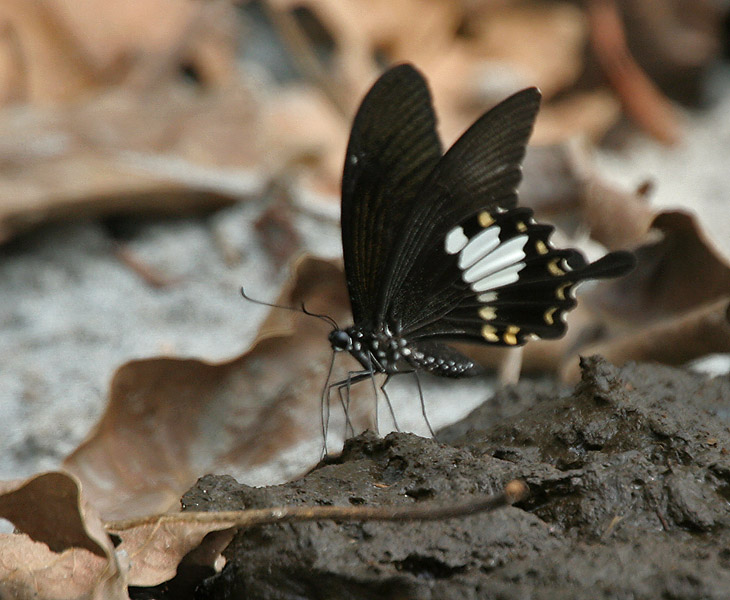
- Yellow Helen (P. n. chaon)

Scientific classification
- Kingdom: Animalia
- Phylum: Arthropoda
- Clade: Pancrustacea
- Class: Insecta
- Order: Lepidoptera
- Family: Papilionidae
- Genus: Papilio
- Species: P. nephelus

Binomial name
- Papilio nephelus Boisduval, 1836

Subspecies
- 10, see text

Synonyms
- Princeps nephelus Papilio chaon Westwood, 1845

= Papilio nephelus =

Species of butterfly

Papilio nephelus is a species of swallowtail butterfly belonging to the family Papilionidae. Subspecies include P. n. chaon, the yellow Helen, and P. n. sunatus, the black and white Helen.

== Description ==
Papilio nephelus has a wingspan reaching about 10–12 centimetres (3.9–4.7 in). The basic colour of the wings is black, with a chain of white spots on the forewing and a large white or yellow area on the hindwing. The underside and the upperside of the wings in this species are very similar. The hindwings have wavy margins, with long tails. The thorax and the abdomen are black.

Papilio nephelus superficially closely resembles P. helenus. The differences are, however, both of structure and of colour. Male forewing upperside: entirely without the thick coating of short hairs on the outer half. Upperside: black with a sprinkling of yellowish-brown scales on the forewing, that form four longitudinal streaks on the cell and internervular streaks on the outer half. Hindwing: the upper discal white patch larger, formed of elongate broad streaks in interspaces 4 to 7 (not 5 to 7): no tornal nor subterminal markings. Underside ground colour duller brownish black; forewing with the diffuse scaling so disposed as to form grey cellular and internervular streaks, the streaks in interspaces 1a and 1 generally white, not diffuse. Hindwing: basal area sprinkled with yellow scales that form three longitudinal slender lines in the cell: the upper white discal patch as on the upperside, but the elongate white markings that compose it well divided by the black veins; below the discal white patch there is a small series of white spots in interspaces 1 to 3, the spot in 1 generally, in 2 very often, tinged with ochraceous yellow; a subterminal complete series of ochraceous-yellow lunules followed by admarginal narrow white spots. Antennae, head, thorax, and abdomen black; beneath: a line of white on the palpi, the thorax with some linear white markings.

Female similar. Upperside ground colour browner; forewing: cellular and internervular streaks more prominent; in many specimens an obscure diffuse whitish subcostal shading just beyond apex of coll. Underside paler. Forewing with the cellular and internervular streaks and subcostal postcellular whitish patch more prominent; the posterior three internervular short streaks on the outer half of the wing white, not diffuse; in a few specimens there is a series of more or less conspicuous admarginal white spots, one in the middle of each interspace. Hindwing markings similar to those in the male, but larger and more prominent. Antennae, head, thorax, and abdomen as in the male, but the abdomen beneath with lateral white markings.

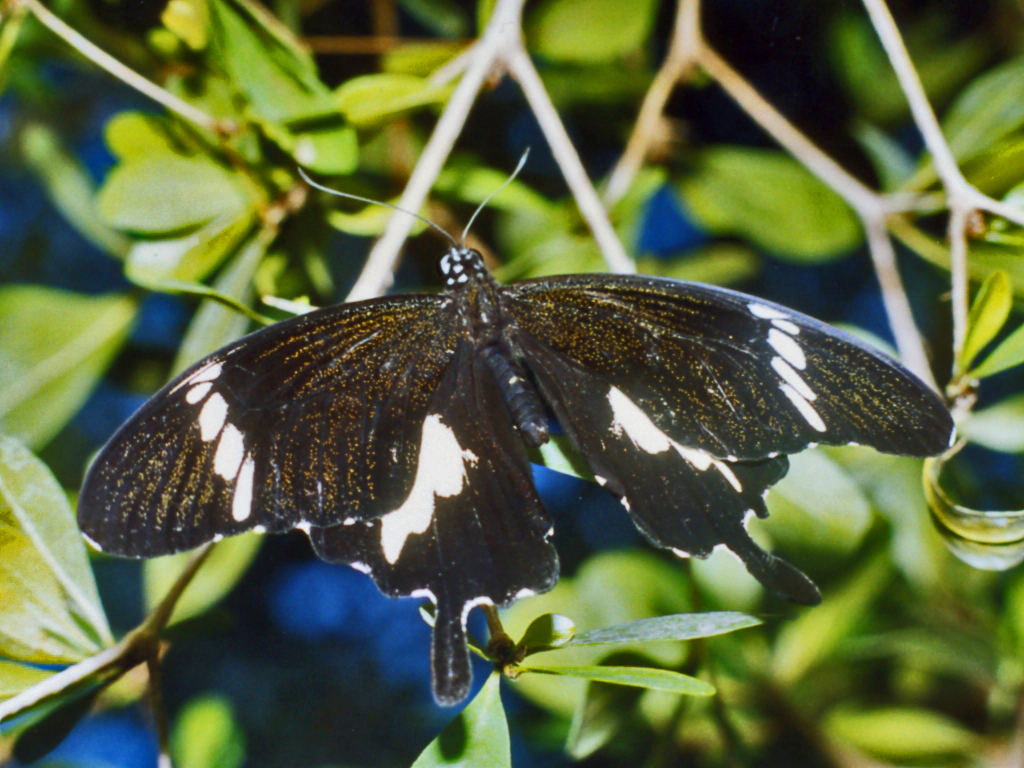
Black and white Helen (P. n. sunatus)

Larvae feed on Toddalia asiatica, Euodia meliifolia, Fagra rhetsa, Citrus species and Zanthoxylum rhetsa.

== Range ==
This species can be found in the Asian part of the Palaearctic realm and partially in the Australasian realm and in the Indomalayan realm, from Nepal, Sikkim, Assam, to the south of China, and from Myanmar to Thailand, Cambodia and Indonesia.

== Habitat ==
These butterflies are mainly present in the lowlands in the primary forests.

== Gallery ==
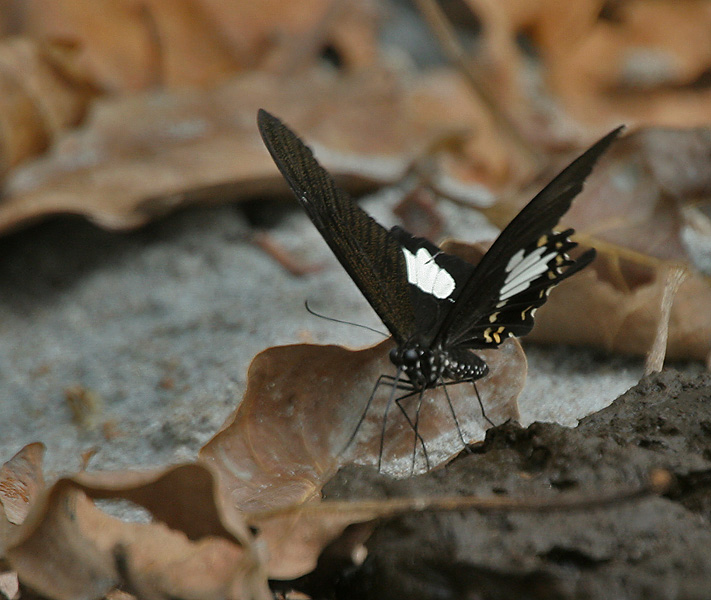
Yellow Helen at Jayanti in Buxa Tiger Reserve in Jalpaiguri district of West Bengal, India

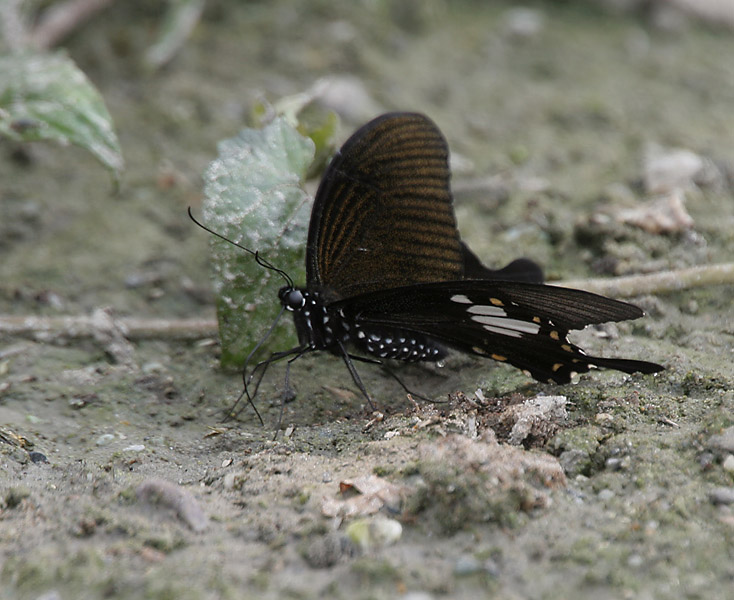
Yellow Helen also at Jayanti

== Subspecies ==
Listed alphabetically:

- Papilio nephelus albolineatus Forbes, 1885 – (Sumatra, Borneo)
- Papilio nephelus annulus Pendlebury, 1936 – (Peninsular Malaya)
- Papilio nephelus chaon Westwood, 1845 – yellow Helen (Orissa, Nepal - Assam, northern Burma, southern Yunnan)
- Papilio nephelus chaonulus Fruhstorfer, 1902 – (southern China, Haina, Taiwan)
- Papilio nephelus ducenarius Fruhstorfer, 1908 – (southern Burma, Tenasserim)
- Papilio nephelus nephelus – (Java)
- Papilio nephelus siporanus Hagen, 1898 – (Mentawej Island)
- Papilio nephelus sunatus Corbet, 1940 – black and white Helen (Peninsular Malaya)
- Papilio nephelus tellonus Fruhstorfer, 1906 – (Batu Islands)
- Papilio nephelus uranus Weymer, 1885 – (Nias)

== Taxonomy ==
Papilio nephelus is a member of the helenus species group. The members of this clade are:

- Papilio helenus Linnaeus, 1758
- Papilio iswara White, 1842
- Papilio iswaroides Fruhstorfer, 1898
- Papilio nephelus Boisduval, 1836
- Papilio nubilus Staudinger, 1895
- Papilio sataspes C. & R. Felder, 1865

== See also ==
- Papilionidae
- List of butterflies of India
- List of butterflies of India (Papilionidae)

== Other reading ==
- Collins, N. Mark; Morris, Michael G. (1985). Threatened Swallowtail Butterflies of the World: The IUCN Red Data Book. Gland & Cambridge: IUCN. ISBN 978-2-88032-603-6 – via Biodiversity Heritage Library.
- Evans, W.H. (1932). The Identification of Indian Butterflies (2nd ed.). Mumbai, India: Bombay Natural History Society.
- Wynter-Blyth, Mark Alexander (1957). Butterflies of the Indian Region. Bombay, India: Bombay Natural History Society. ISBN 978-8170192329.
