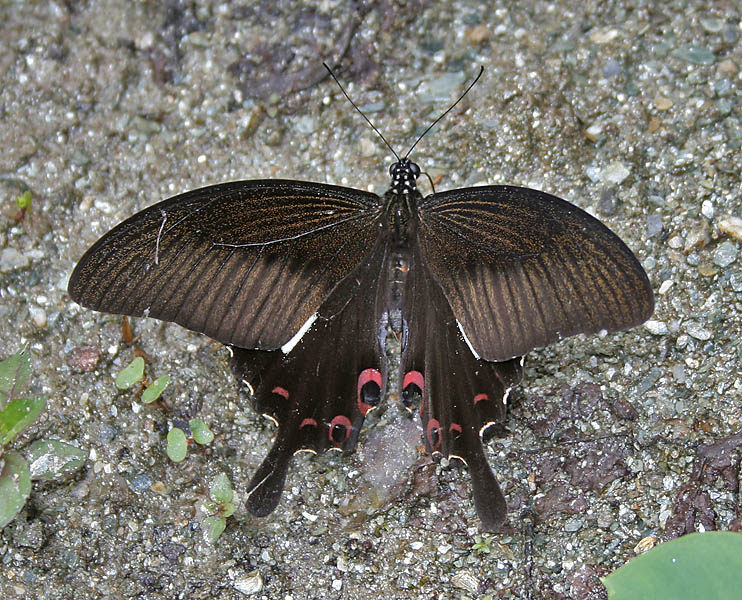

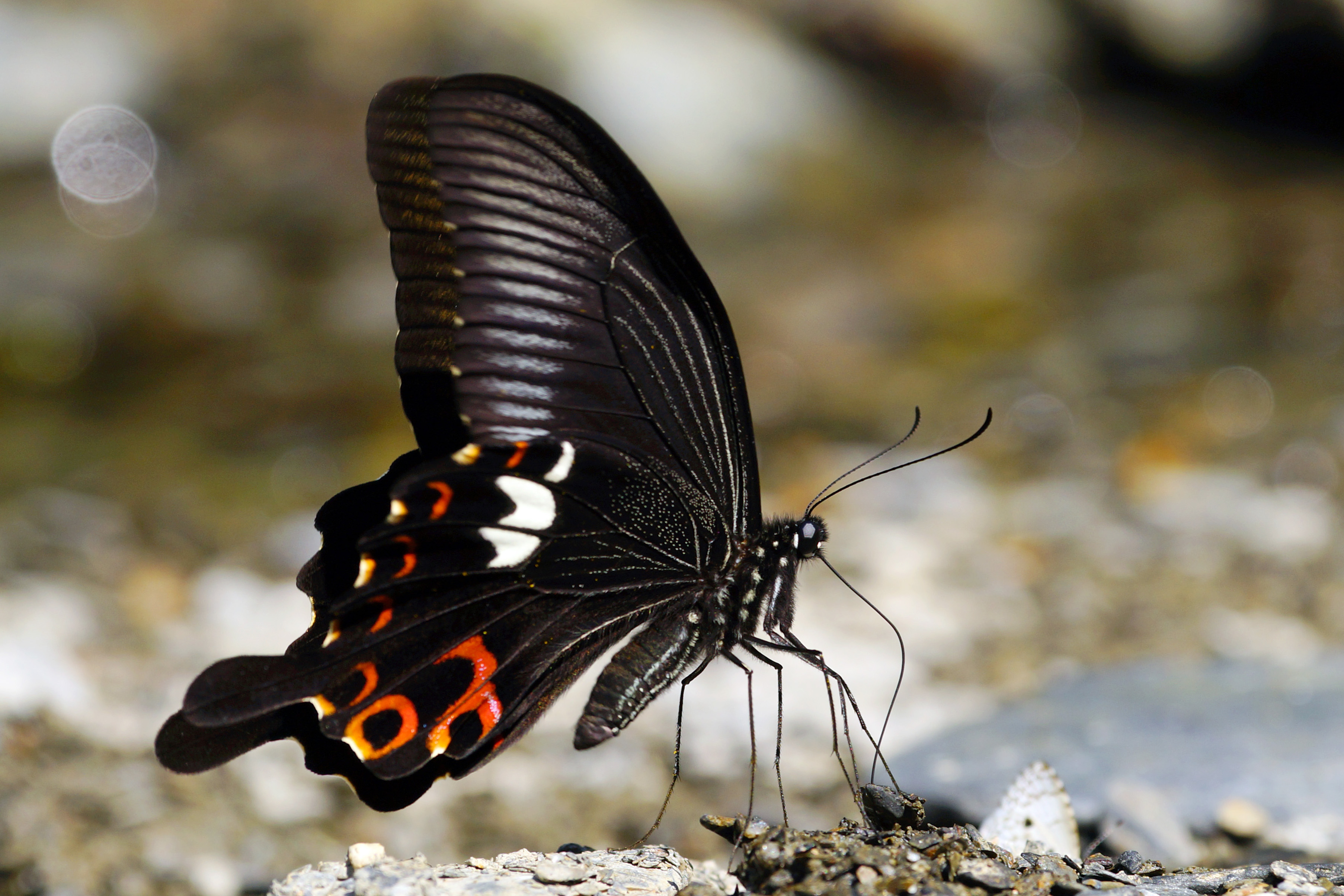
- P. h. fortunius

Scientific classification
- Kingdom: Animalia
- Phylum: Arthropoda
- Clade: Pancrustacea
- Class: Insecta
- Order: Lepidoptera
- Family: Papilionidae
- Genus: Papilio
- Species: P. helenus

Binomial name
- Papilio helenus Linnaeus, 1758

= Papilio helenus =

Red Helen

Species of butterfly

Papilio helenus, the red Helen, is a large swallowtail butterfly found in forests of southern India and parts of southeast Asia.

== Range ==
Papilio helenus is rarely found in Sri Lanka, southern and north-east India, Nepal, Bhutan, Bangladesh, Myanmar, Thailand, Laos, Kampuchea, Vietnam, southern China (including Hainan, Guangdong province), Taiwan, southern Japan, South Korea, Ryukyu Islands, peninsular and eastern Malaysia, Brunei, Philippines, and Indonesia (Sumatra, Java, Bangka, Kalimantan, the Lesser Sunda Islands except Tanimbar).

In India it occurs along the Western Ghats from Kerala to Gujarat, also Palnis and Shevaroys, in the north from Mussoorie eastwards, to north-east India and onto Myanmar.

== Description ==
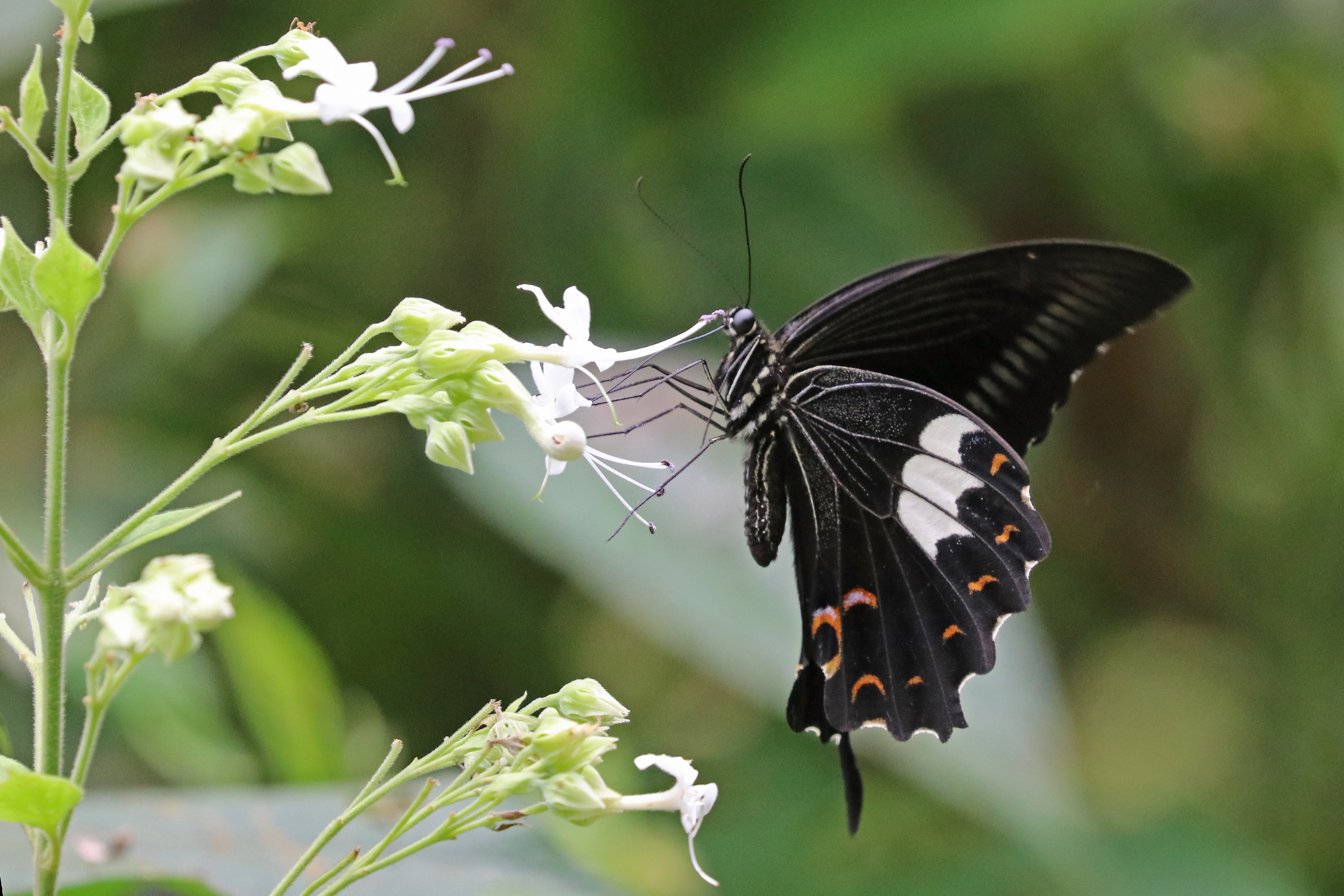
P. h. daksha, Kerala, India

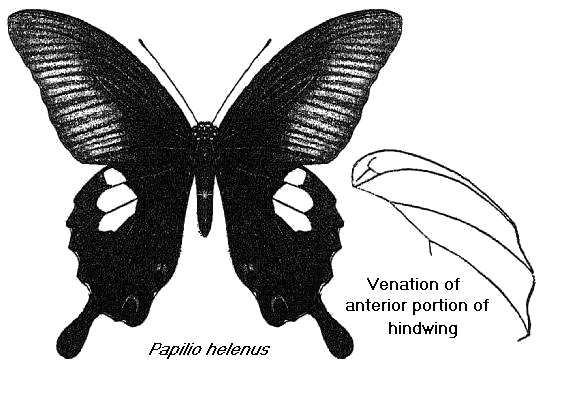
Woodcut from The Fauna of British India, Including Ceylon and Burma

Male. Upper-side rich brownish-black; cilia alternated with white. Fore-wing with slender longitudinal streaks of golden-yellow scales within the cell, and hairy-scaled broad streaks between the outer veins; lower base of the wing also sparsely speckled with golden-yellow scales. Hind-wing with a cream- white upper discal patch composed of three portions, a short almost quadrate portion in the costal interspace, and two lower large elongate portions in the subcostal interspaces, a few white or grey scales also being present below the lower portion; at the anal angle is a dark purple-red circlet which generally partly encloses a round black spot, followed by a lower submarginal series of three, sometimes four, more or less apparent purple-red incurved lunules, the first or lower one sometimes forming a circle round a black spot; in some specimens the lower lunule is obsolescent, in others all the latter are obsolete. Underside paler. Fore-wing with prominent greyish-white scaled slender cell-streaks and bread outer vein-streaks. Hind-wing with the upper basal area speckled with greyish-white scale.*, and three similar scaled slender longitudinal streaks within the cell, the base of the median and sub median vein also being white scaled; upper discal white patch composed of three smaller portions than on the upper-side; anal ocellus and a complete series of submarginal lunules dark red; an inner sub anal confluent lunles also present in the lower median interspace; the anal and sub anal lunules being speckled with violet-blue scales; beyond is a marginal row of more or less defined red-and-white scaled lunules.

Female. Upper-side and underside similar to the male, except that the base of the hind-wing is paler.

Body brownish-black; collar, front of head and palpi white-spotted; tegulae white fringed; legs and antenna black.

— Frederic Moore, Lepidoptera Indica. Vol. V

== Status ==
Papilio helenus is generally uncommon and slightly threatened (in certain places). It is very commonly found Maharashtra, but also rarely in Gujarat and parts of Kerala. Its history can be traced back to Assam and Western Ghats, where it is currently endemic.

== Taxonomy ==
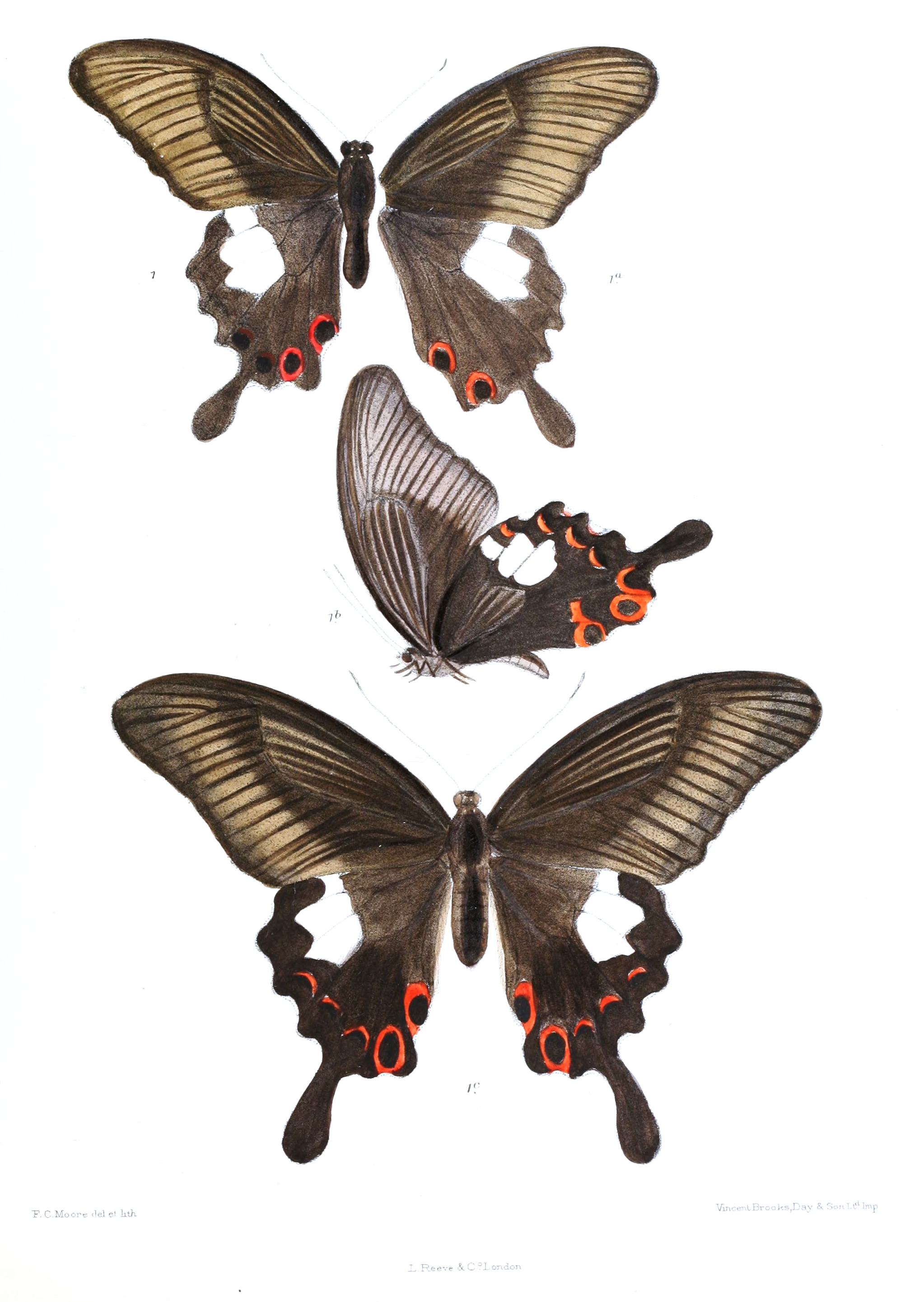
Illustration

=== Species group ===
Papilio helenus is the nominate member of the helenus species group. The members of this clade are:

- Papilio helenus Linnaeus, 1758
- Papilio iswara White, 1842
- Papilio iswaroides Fruhstorfer, 1898
- Papilio nephelus Boisduval, 1836
- Papilio nubilus Staudinger, 1895
- Papilio sataspes C. & R. Felder, 1865

=== Subspecies ===
There are up to thirteen different subspecies, two of which occur in India:

- P. h. daksha Moore - South India. Not rare
- P. h. helenus Linnaeus - Mussoorie to Myanmar. Common

and one in Taiwan:

- P. h. fortunius Fruhstorfer, 1908

== Life cycle ==
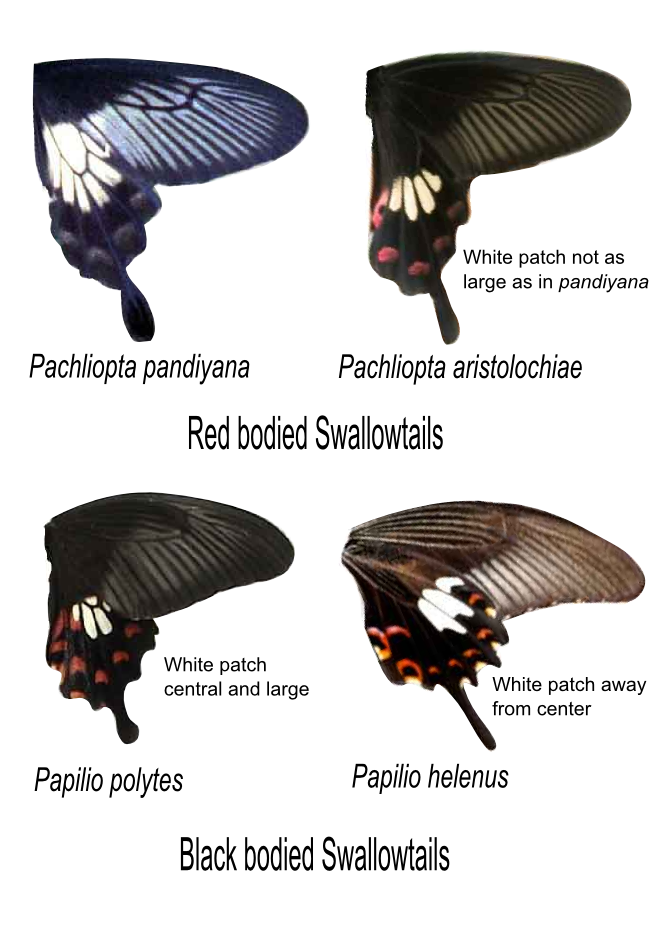
Similar species

This butterfly flies throughout the year in southern India.

=== Eggs ===
The egg is pale apricot-yellow in colour when freshly deposited, spherical in shape and has a slightly roughened exterior which looks like the skin of an orange when seen through a microscope. The diameter of an egg is 1.2 mm.

The eggs are deposited singly on the tips of very young leaves and shoots in shady parts of thick jungle. Before hatching, the eggs appear to be marked by chocolate coloured lines and flecks. The egg hatches in 4 to 7 days.

=== Caterpillar ===
The freshly emerged larva is about 3 mm long. Throughout the caterpillar stage, if it is agitated it can evert a yellow-to-red osmeterium from the first segment, just behind the head. Each of the other segments bears, on the back, a pair of tufts of stiff hairs, each tuft arising from a small, yellowish conical process. The overall colour is brown, but there is a whitish saddle-like patch about the middle and the tail segments are also whitish in colour.

Like other Papilio species the larva can evert a two-pronged horn-like osmeterium when it is irritated. The osmeterium secretes an repugnatorial|unpleasant-smelling liquid which is believed to repel predators and parasites.

After the first moult the caterpillar has the appearance of a shiny bird dropping. The larva is grass green in colour, mottled black and white and smoky grey. The osmeterium, when everted, is generally yellow to red.

While inactive, mainly during daylight hours, the young larva lies along the midrib of the underside of the leaf. Later on, when it is largely fully grown, it is greener and lies on the centre of the upperside of the leaf, on a stem or a twig. The fifth instar larva is about 5 cm long.

== See also ==
- Papilionidae
- List of butterflies of India
- List of butterflies of India (Papilionidae)
