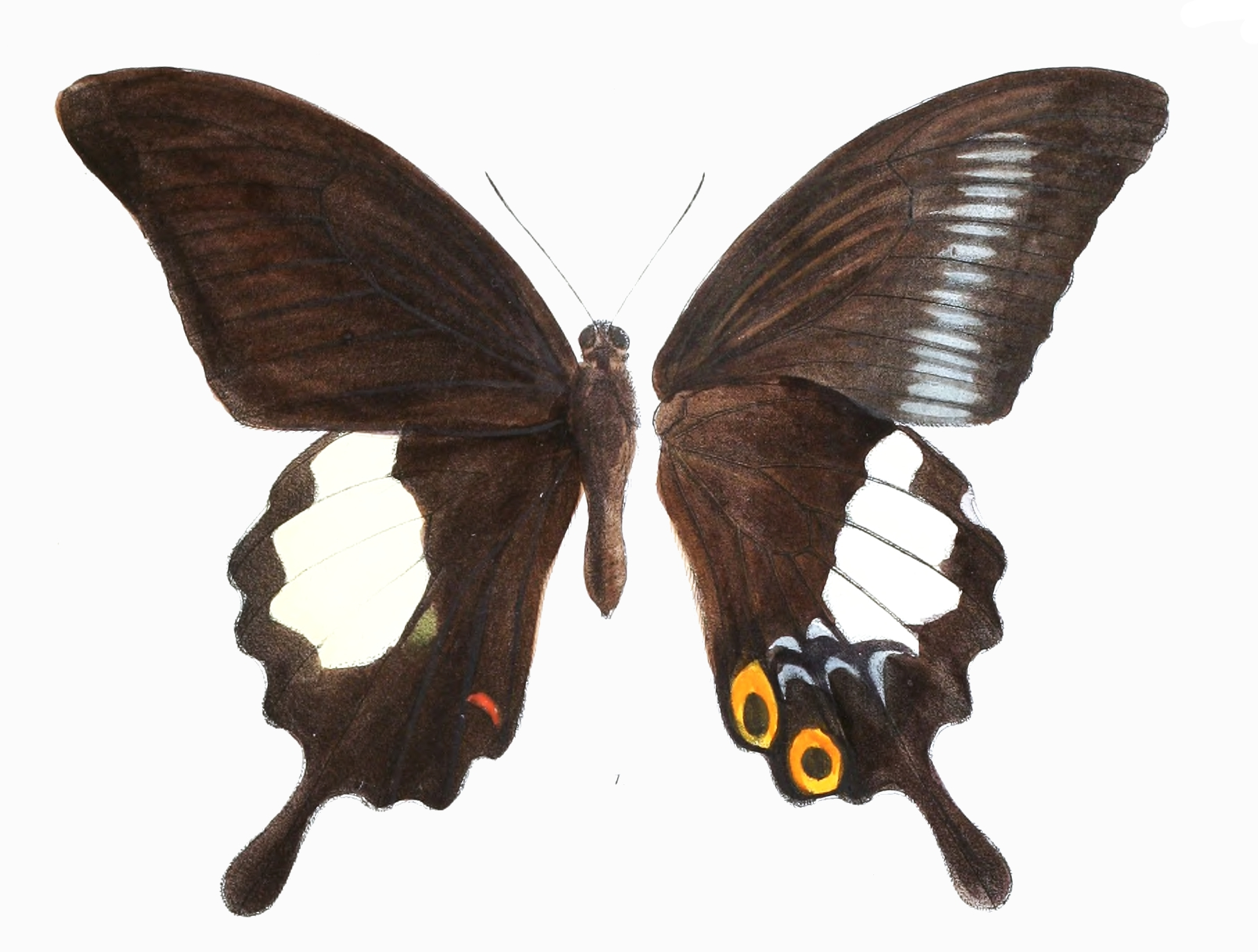
- Male
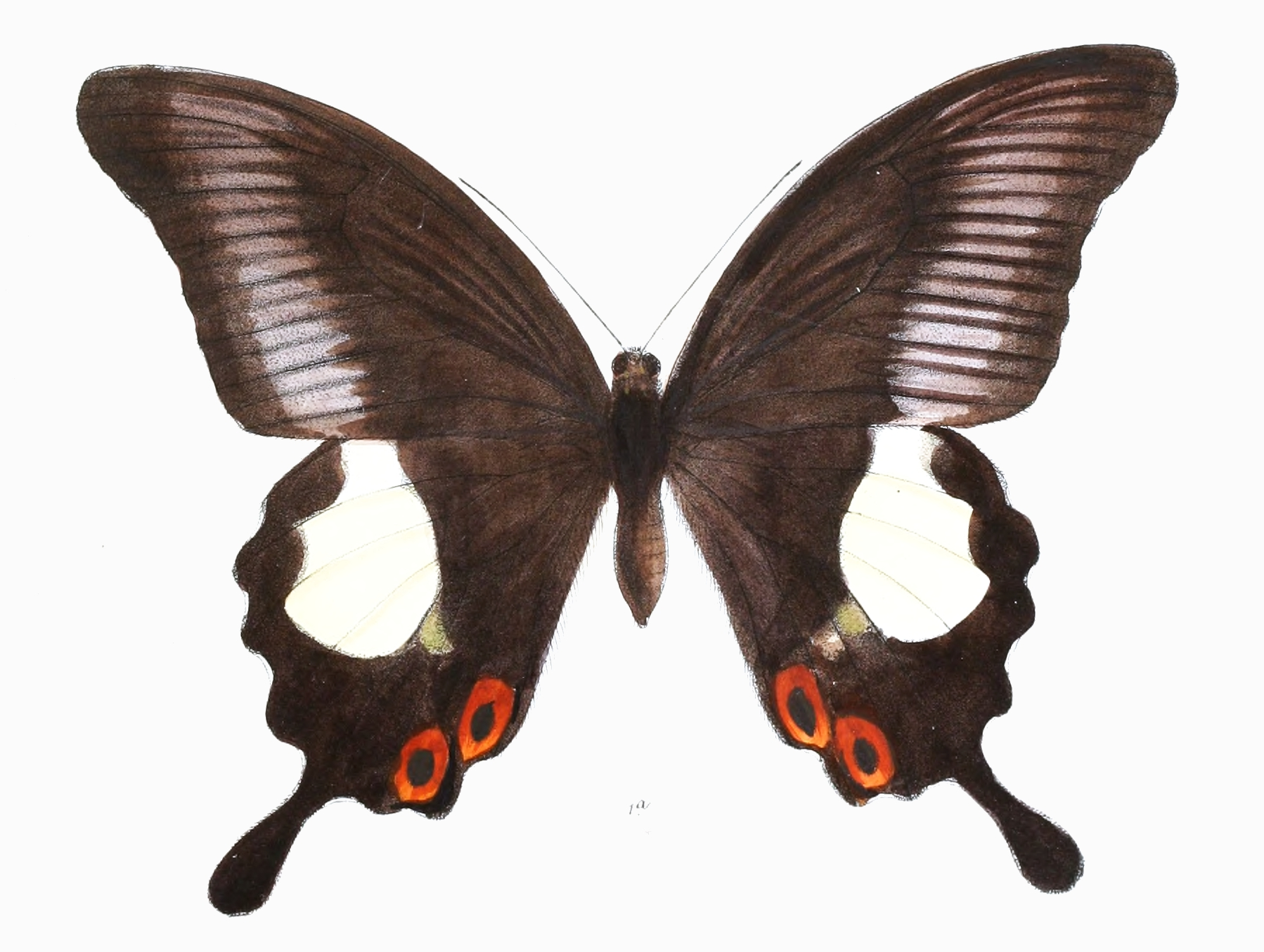
- Female

Scientific classification
- Kingdom: Animalia
- Phylum: Arthropoda
- Clade: Pancrustacea
- Class: Insecta
- Order: Lepidoptera
- Family: Papilionidae
- Genus: Papilio
- Species: P. iswara

Binomial name
- Papilio iswara White, 1842

Synonyms
- Papilio araspes C. & R. Felder, 1859

= Papilio iswara =

Species of butterfly

Papilio iswara, the great Helen, is a species of large swallowtail butterfly found in parts of Southeast Asia.

== Description ==
P. iswara. Very similar to P. helenus. Palpi entirely white; the white area of the hindwing consists of 4 patches, of which the 3rd is the largest; the area in the male smaller beneath than above, with the exception of the 4th spot, which is larger beneath, between it and the red anal eye-spot in the female two more white spots, of which at least the upper one is also distinct in the mostly only 2 red submarginal spots present, both large, usually forming a ring-spot with the marginal spots, before the anal submarginal spot no red discal spot as in P. helenus, but always 3 blue lunules. The disc of the upper surface of the forewing in the with pilose hairs. The female paler than the male, the red submarginal spots larger on both surfaces. The genitalia similar to those of P. helenus, the harpe of the more spoon-shaped and the infra-anal processes shorter. Like P. helenus occurring in wooded districts, principally in the hills. The early stages not known. Distributed from South Tenasserim to Sumatra and Borneo; only locally plentiful. -— iswara White (21 c). The white area of the hindwing posteriorly broad; the yellow-red spots of the underside of the hindwing large, the anterior ring-spot also in the male entire, the black pupils of both the eye-spots in the female small. Lower Tenasserim, Malay Peninsula, Penang, Sumatra, Banka. The specimens from the last two islands approximate to the next form. —araspes Fldr. On an average smaller than iswara, but the largest specimens much larger than the smallest iswara. The white area of the hindwing mostly not so broad as in iswara, posteriorly more pointed; the red spots of the hindwing beneath and the 4th white discal patch smaller. One of the two females in the Tring Museum from Lawas, North Borneo, on the underside of the hindwing anteriorly 3 thin red submarginal lunules, before the 1. median a fine red longitudinal curved mark and before the tail traces of another submarginal spot, so that the complete row of submarginal lunules is at least indicated. Borneo and Natuna Islands; our two specimens from Bungaran, Natuna, approximate a little to iswar- Karl Jordan in Seitz.

== Status ==
Papilio iswara is not uncommon and not threatened.

== Subspecies ==
- Papilio iswara iswara (southern Burma to Singapore, Sumatra, Bangka)
- Papilio iswara araspes C. & R. Felder, 1859 (northern Borneo, Natuna Island)

== Taxonomy ==
Papilio iswara is a member of the helenus species group. The members of this clade are:

- Papilio helenus Linnaeus, 1758
- Papilio iswara White, 1842
- Papilio iswaroides Fruhstorfer, 1898
- Papilio nephelus Boisduval, 1836
- Papilio nubilus Staudinger, 1895
- Papilio sataspes C. & R. Felder, 1865

== Type material ==
The holotype is conserved in the Natural History Museum, London.
