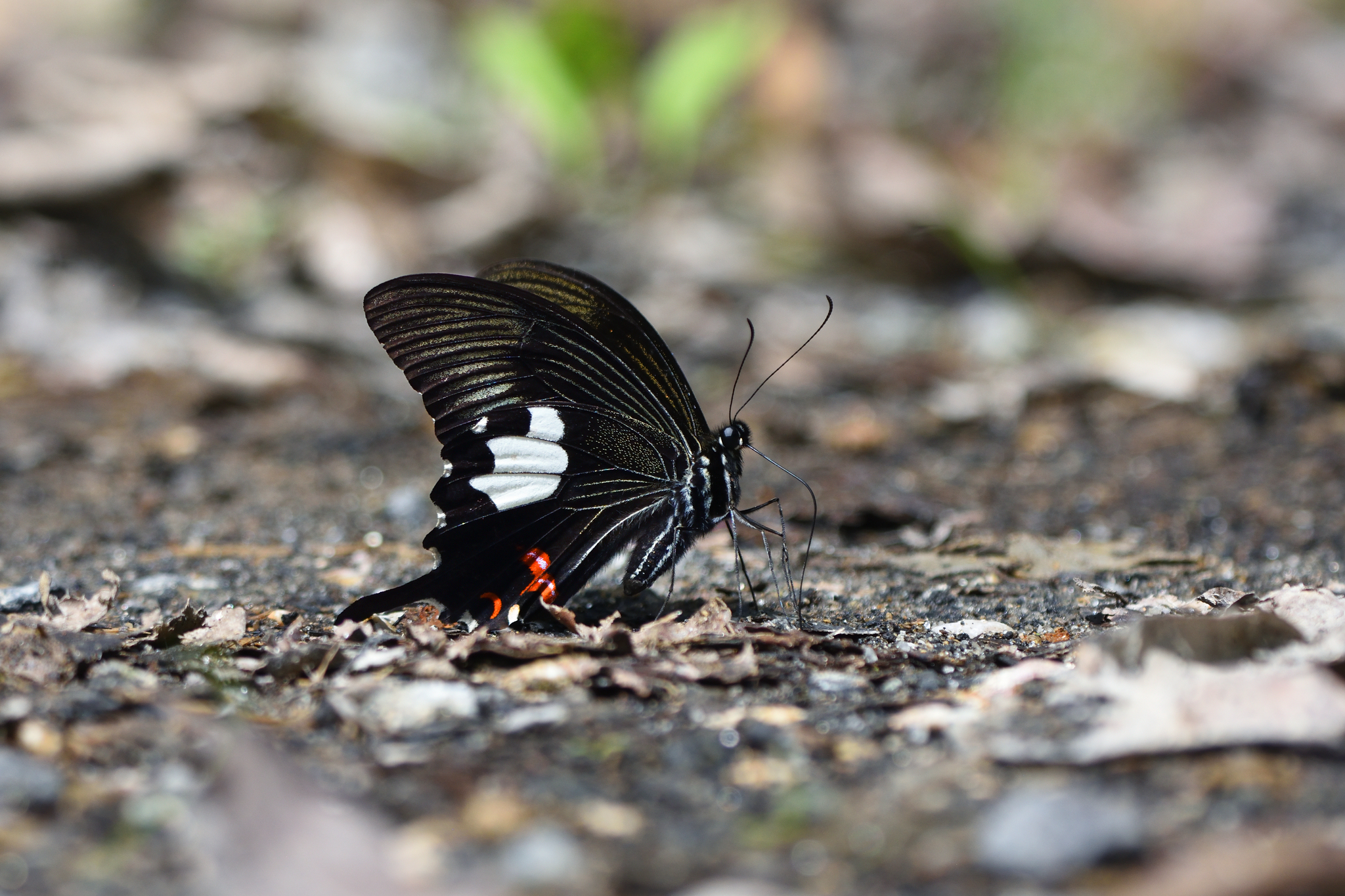

Scientific classification
- Kingdom: Animalia
- Phylum: Arthropoda
- Clade: Pancrustacea
- Class: Insecta
- Order: Lepidoptera
- Family: Papilionidae
- Genus: Papilio
- Species: P. iswaroides

Binomial name
- Papilio iswaroides Fruhstorfer, 1898

Synonyms
- Papilio helenus iswaroides Fruhstorfer, 1898; Papilio curtisi Jordan, 1909

= Papilio iswaroides =

Species of butterfly

Papilio iswaroides is a species of swallowtail butterfly from the genus Papilio that is found in Malaysia and Sumatra. It was first described by German entomologist Hans Fruhstorfer in 1898.

== Description ==
P. iswaroides Male confusingly similar to Papilio helenus. Forewing above with yellowish discal stripes, beneath the posterior discal stripes are broader and purer white than in helenus. Hindwing beneath with larger marginal spots than inhelenus and with only 2 red submarginal lunules, as the 5 anterior lunules are wanting. Genitalia: the two infra-anal processes of the last (= 10.) segment pointed, but obtuse; the harpe, which in helenus is twisted somewhat like a corkscrew, is placed in iswaroides before the middle of the anal clasper, is much narrower than in helenus and its free part is simply curved inwards away from the clasper, without being twisted half round. The female is not known. Sumatra and Malacca, probably more widely distributed, but mistaken for helenus. — curtisi subsp. nov., from Selangore, Malay Peninsula; only 1 male known to me. The discal stripes placed between the 8. radial and the 2. median on the under surface of the forewing only as long as the black marginal area is broad; the white area of the hindwing narrower than in the next form. — iswaroides Fruhst. (21 c) flies all the year round in the mountains of Sumatra, where Dr. Martin's collectors captured a rather large number.All the discal stripes of the forewing beneath at least twice as long as the black distal margin is broad; the 2.white patch of the hindwing about twice as long as its distance from the distal margin. Karl Jordan in Seitz.

== Subspecies ==
- Papilio iswaroides iswaroides (Sumatra)
- Papilio iswaroides curtisi Jordan, 1909 (Peninsular Malaya)

== Taxonomy ==
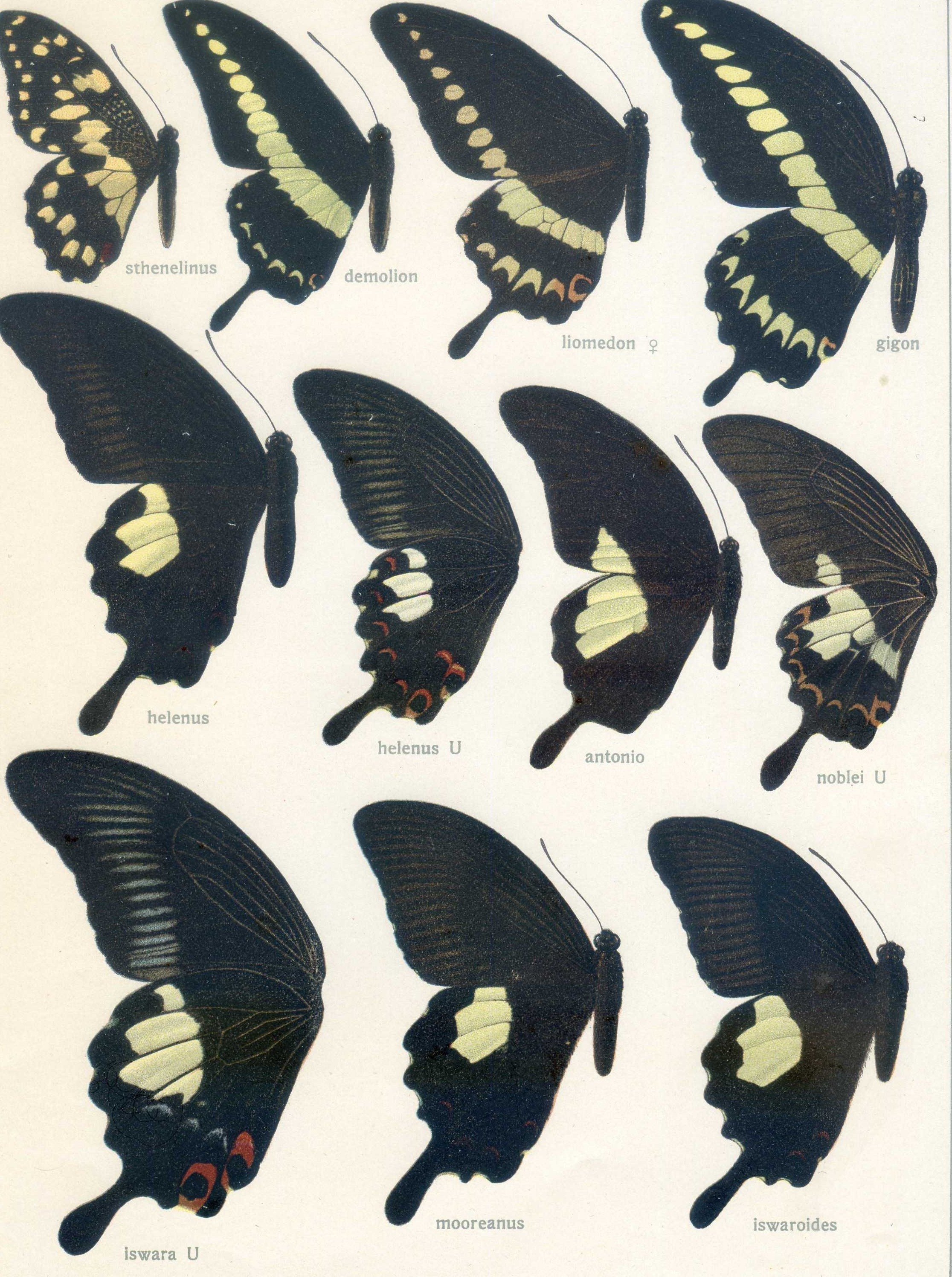
Papilio iswaroides in Adalbert Seitz Fauna Indoaustralica

Papilio iswaroides is a member of the helenus species-group. The members of this clade are

- Papilio helenus Linnaeus, 1758
- Papilio iswara White, 1842
- Papilio iswaroides Fruhstorfer, 1898
- Papilio nephelus Boisduval, 1836
- Papilio nubilus Staudinger, 1895
- Papilio sataspes C. & R. Felder, 1865
