= Papilio nubilus =

Scientific classification
- Kingdom: Animalia
- Phylum: Arthropoda
- Clade: Pancrustacea
- Class: Insecta
- Order: Lepidoptera
- Family: Papilionidae
- Genus: Papilio
- Species: P. nubilus

Binomial name
- Papilio nubilus Staudinger, 1895

Species of butterfly

Papilio nubilus is a rare species of swallowtail butterfly from the genus Papilio that can be found in Borneo.

Previously listed as a distinct species ( D'Abrera 1982, Munroe 1961), but now regarded (by Collins & Morris 1985, Tsukada & Nishiyama 1982: 307) as an interspecific hybrid between Papilio nephelus and Papilio polytes.

== Description ==
Similar to Papilio nephelus; Male small, the subapical spots of the forewing not sharply defined eitherabove or beneath, more or less dusted with black, the 3. and 4. spots placed much nearer to the cell than in P. nephelus, the 4. far removed from the distal margin; hindwing above with white discal band consisting of 7 patches, of which the 3. and 4. are the longest, no submarginal spots above, beneath a complete row, all white, smaller than in P. nephelus, especially the 4., 5. and 6. The female not known. Borneo and Sumatra.

== Subspecies ==
- Papilio nubilus nubilus (northern Borneo)
- Papilio nubilus musianus Rothschild, 1899 Forewing above with 3 subapical spots, below which a fourth is indicated, beneath with an anal spot, before which a second, very small one is placed; the 4. and 5. submarginal spots of the hindwing beneath extremely small.1 male in the Tring Museum, from the hills west of Palembang South-East Sumatra (Upper Palembang district)Karl Jordan in Seitz.

== Taxonomy ==
Papilio nubilus is a member of the helenus species-group. Other members of this clade are

- Papilio helenus Linnaeus, 1758
- Papilio iswara White, 1842
- Papilio iswaroides Fruhstorfer, 1898
- Papilio nephelus Boisduval, 1836
- Papilio nubilus Staudinger, 1895
- Papilio sataspes C. & R. Felder, 1865
