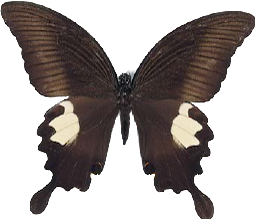
- a female specimen of Papilio sataspes sataspes

Scientific classification
- Kingdom: Animalia
- Phylum: Arthropoda
- Clade: Pancrustacea
- Class: Insecta
- Order: Lepidoptera
- Family: Papilionidae
- Genus: Papilio
- Species: P. sataspes

Binomial name
- Papilio sataspes C. & R. Felder, 1865

Synonyms
- Papilio hecuba Wallace, 1865; Papilio helenus var. artaphernes Honrath, 1886; Papilio artaphernes var. ahasverus Staudinger, 1895

= Papilio sataspes =

Species of butterfly

Papilio sataspes is a species of swallowtail butterfly from the genus Papilio that is found in Sulawesi and Banggai.

== Description ==
Similar to Papilio iswara, but the 2. segment of the palpus black, the white area of the hindwing smaller, in two of the three sataspes-forms very much reduced above and entirely or almost entirely absent beneath; the submarginal spots of the hindwing yellow, the 5. rarely indicated, commonly also the 3. and 4. suppressed.Celebes, Bangkai and Sulla Islands, not rare in the hills. — sataspes Fldr. (22 a) is distributed over the whole of Celebes. The white area of the hindwing above and beneath consists of 3 large patches, to which in the female is added a 4. spot, which is especially distinct beneath. — artaphernes Honr. The very much reduced white area of the hindwing only extends above to the 2. radial and is almost suppressed beneath. Bangkai; not known to me in nature. — ahasverus Stgr. (22 a), which is perhaps identical with the preceding, flies on the Sulla Islands, where the male is not rare; the area of the hindwing even smaller than in artaphernes, never reaching the 2. radial, beneath only the 2. spot indicated by a very thin line. In the female the area of the hindwing above is still narrower than in the and beneath there are 2 thin lunules in its place. Only known to me from Sulla-Mangoli.Karl Jordan in Seitz.

== Subspecies ==
- Papilio sataspes sataspes (Sulawesi)
- Papilio sataspes artaphernes Honrath, 1886 (Bangkai Island)

== Taxonomy ==
Papilio sataspes is a member of the helenus species-group. The members of this clade are

- Papilio helenus Linnaeus, 1758
- Papilio iswara White, 1842
- Papilio iswaroides Fruhstorfer, 1898
- Papilio nephelus Boisduval, 1836
- Papilio nubilus Staudinger, 1895
- Papilio sataspes C. & R. Felder, 1865

== Protection ==
Protected in Bantimurung – Bulusaraung National Park.
