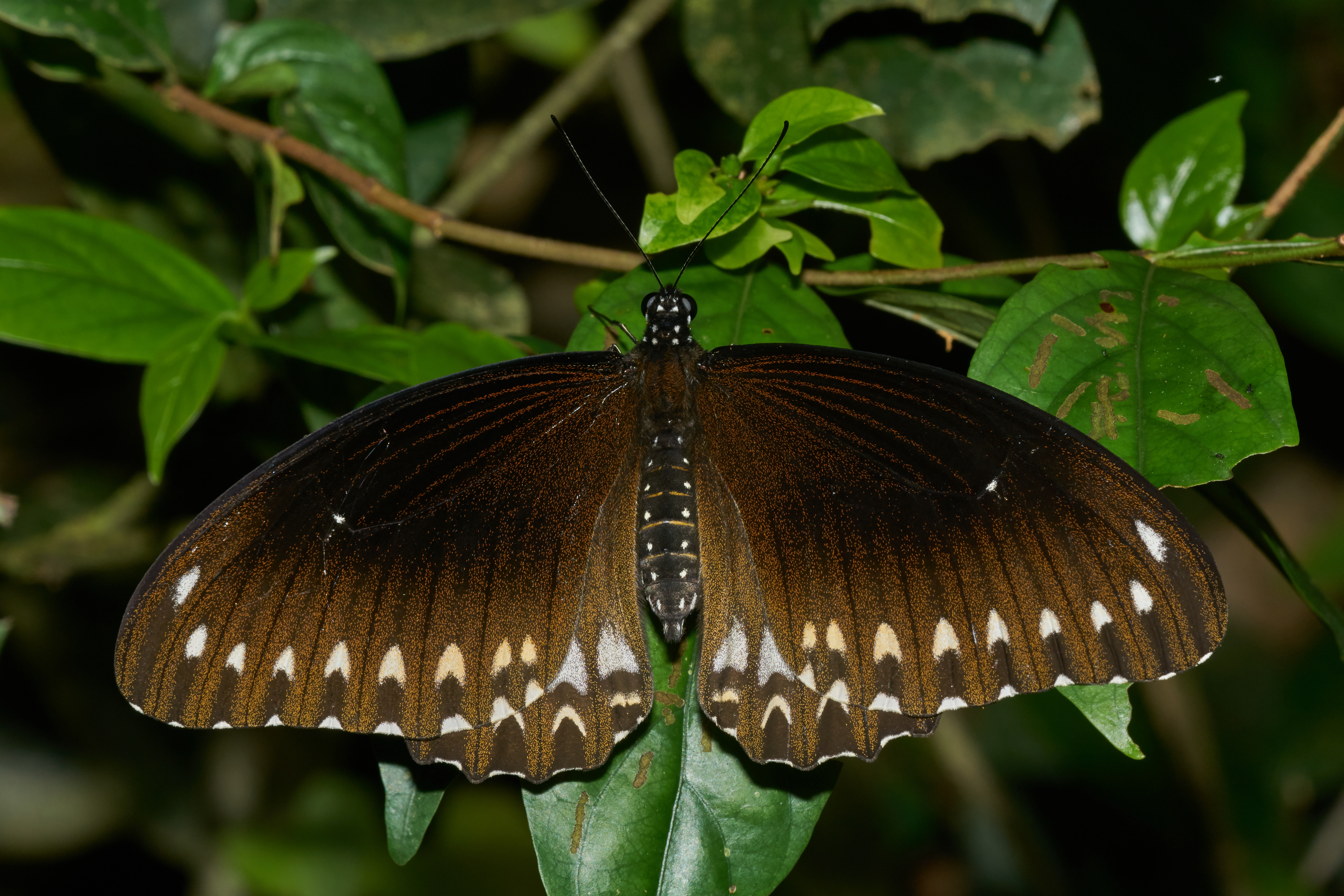
- Dorsal view
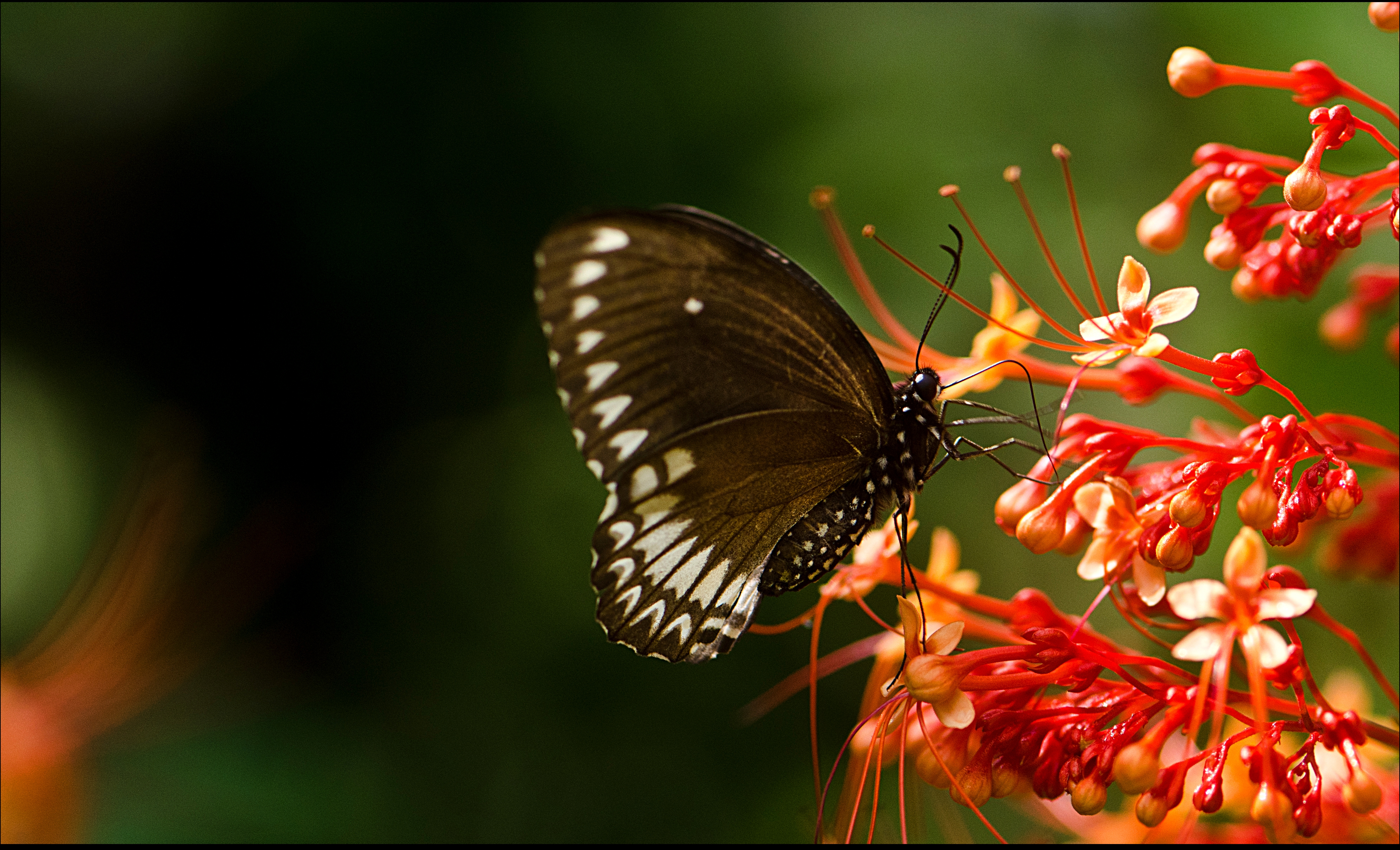
- Ventral view

Scientific classification
- Kingdom: Animalia
- Phylum: Arthropoda
- Class: Insecta
- Order: Lepidoptera
- Family: Papilionidae
- Genus: Papilio
- Species: P. dravidarum

Binomial name
- Papilio dravidarum Wood-Mason, 1880
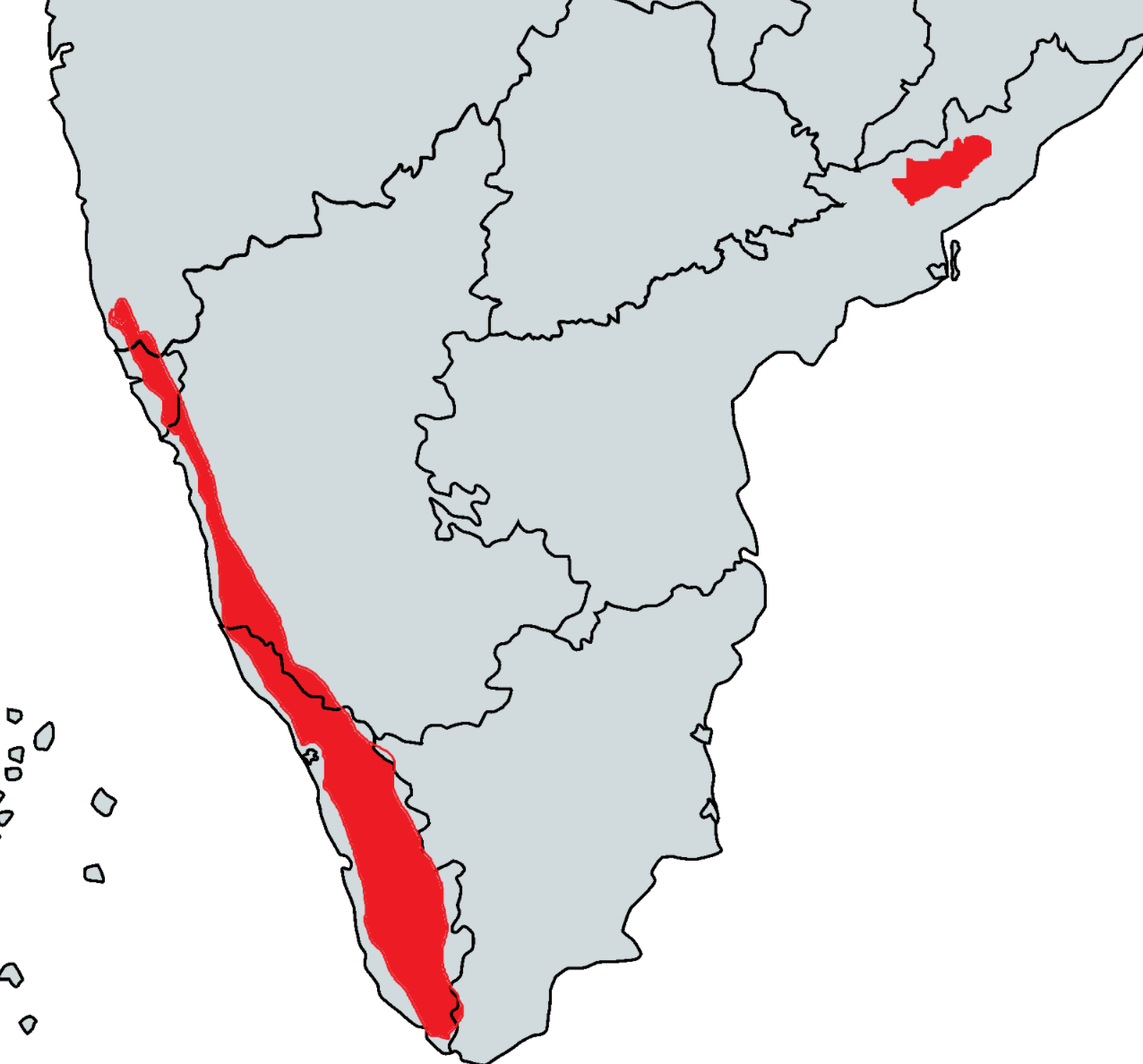

Synonyms
- Princeps dravidarum

= Papilio dravidarum =

Malabar raven

Species of butterfly

Papilio dravidarum, the Malabar raven, is a species of swallowtail butterfly. It is endemic to the Western Ghats and Visakhapatnam district of India.

== Description ==
The Malabar raven is a blackish-brown tailless swallowtail butterfly, about 80 to 100 mm in size. Both the sexes are similar and are mimics of the unpalatable common crow (Euploea core). The upper forewing has a small white spot at the end of the cell, a complete series of equal sized marginal white spots in regular row and a terminal series of spots decreasing in size towards the apex. The upper hindwing has a discal series of arrow shaped white spots. It also has a submarginal series of elongated white crescent shaped markings. There is a white fringe between the veins. The outer halves of wings have a dusting of yellowish brown scales.

== Range ==
It is found in South India where it occurs in the states of Kerala, Tamil Nadu, Karnataka, Goa and Andhra Pradesh.

== Status ==
The butterfly is uncommon but not known to be threatened. It was commonest in Wynaad and Coorg in the past and rarer towards the extremities of its range.

== Habitat ==
This butterfly frequents heavy jungles of the Western Ghats between 1,000 and 3,000 feet (300 and 910 m). It has been recorded in January and from March to October.

== Habits ==
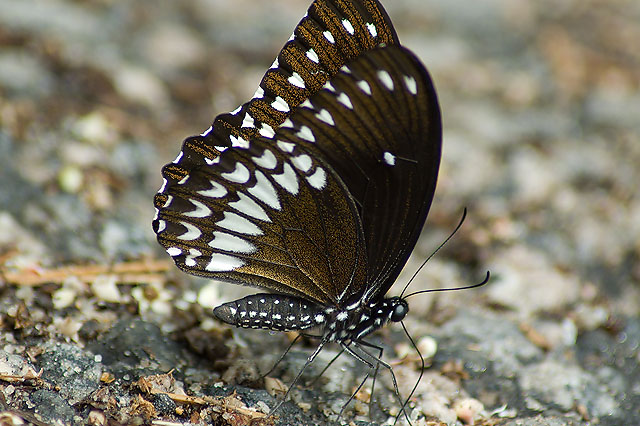
Mud-puddling specimen, Pollachi

The Malabar raven resembles the model common crow in habits and flight, but is faster than the other mimic, the common mime. It prefers shady patches. The males drink at wet patches especially in the hot dry pre-monsoon days.

== Life cycle ==
There are two to three broods a year. It is recorded in Coorg as having broods from September to October, November to December, and, from April to May. It has been recorded in Karnataka in July and in September. Males appear to outnumber the females.

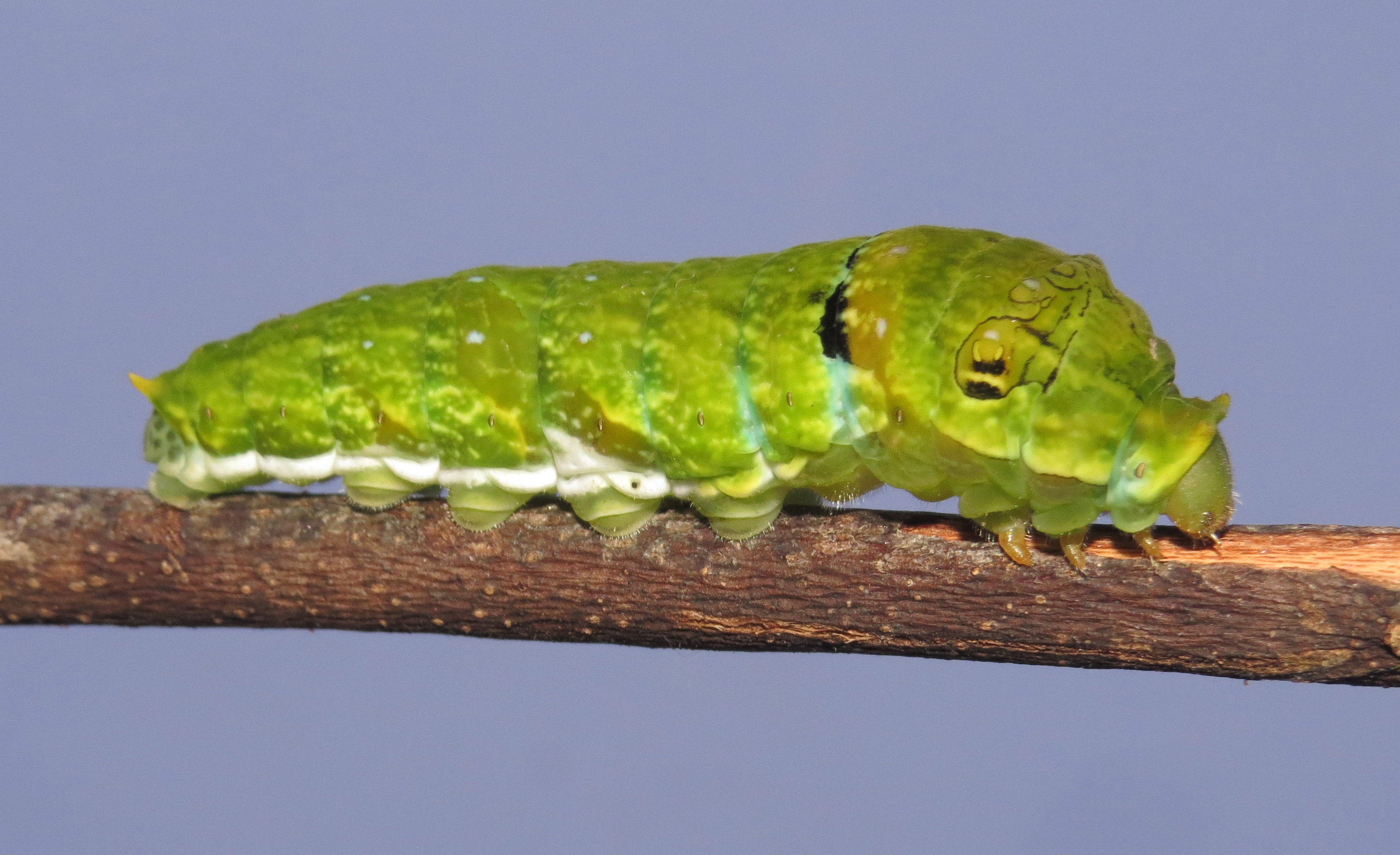
Caterpillar

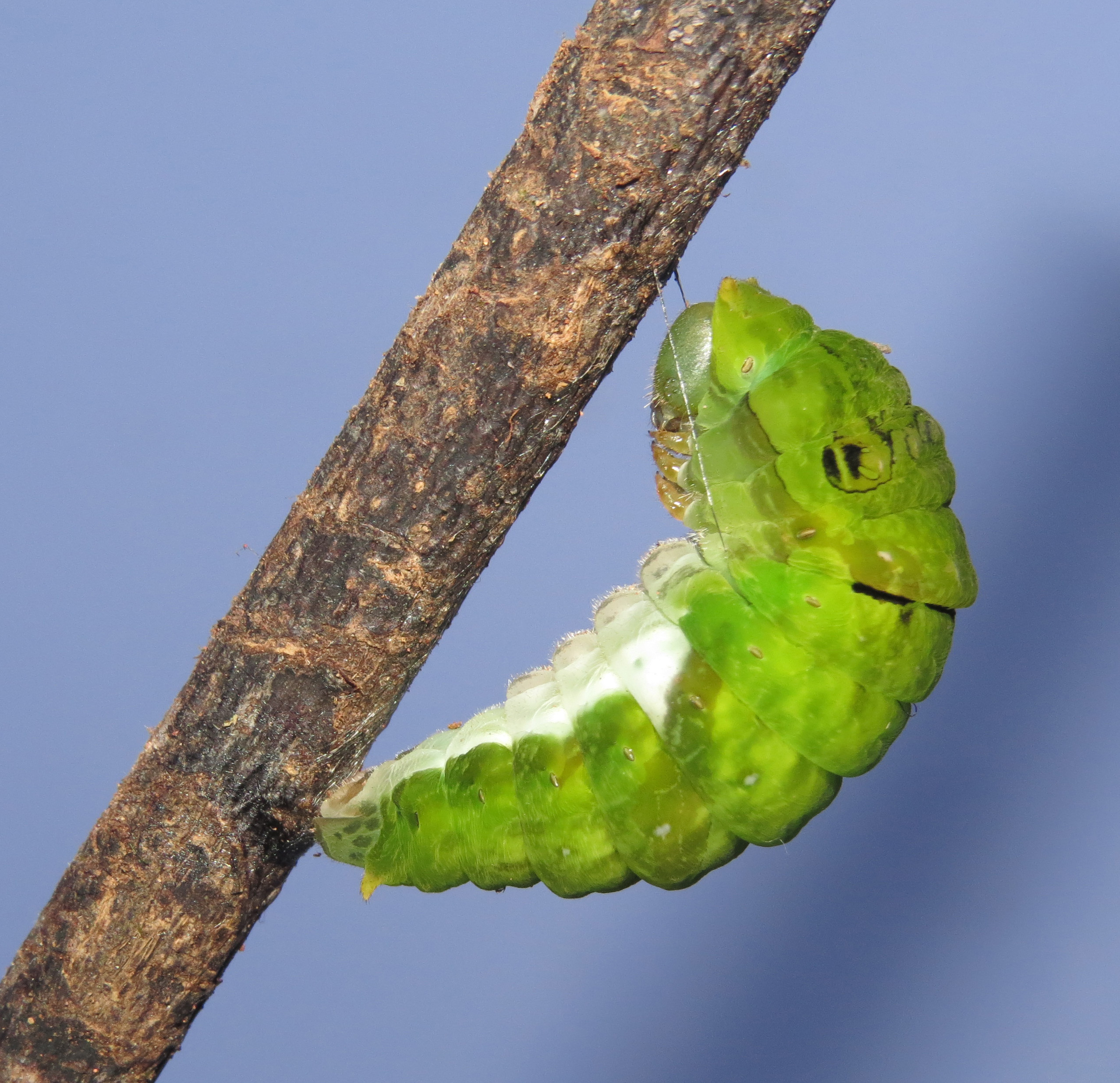
Caterpillar pupating

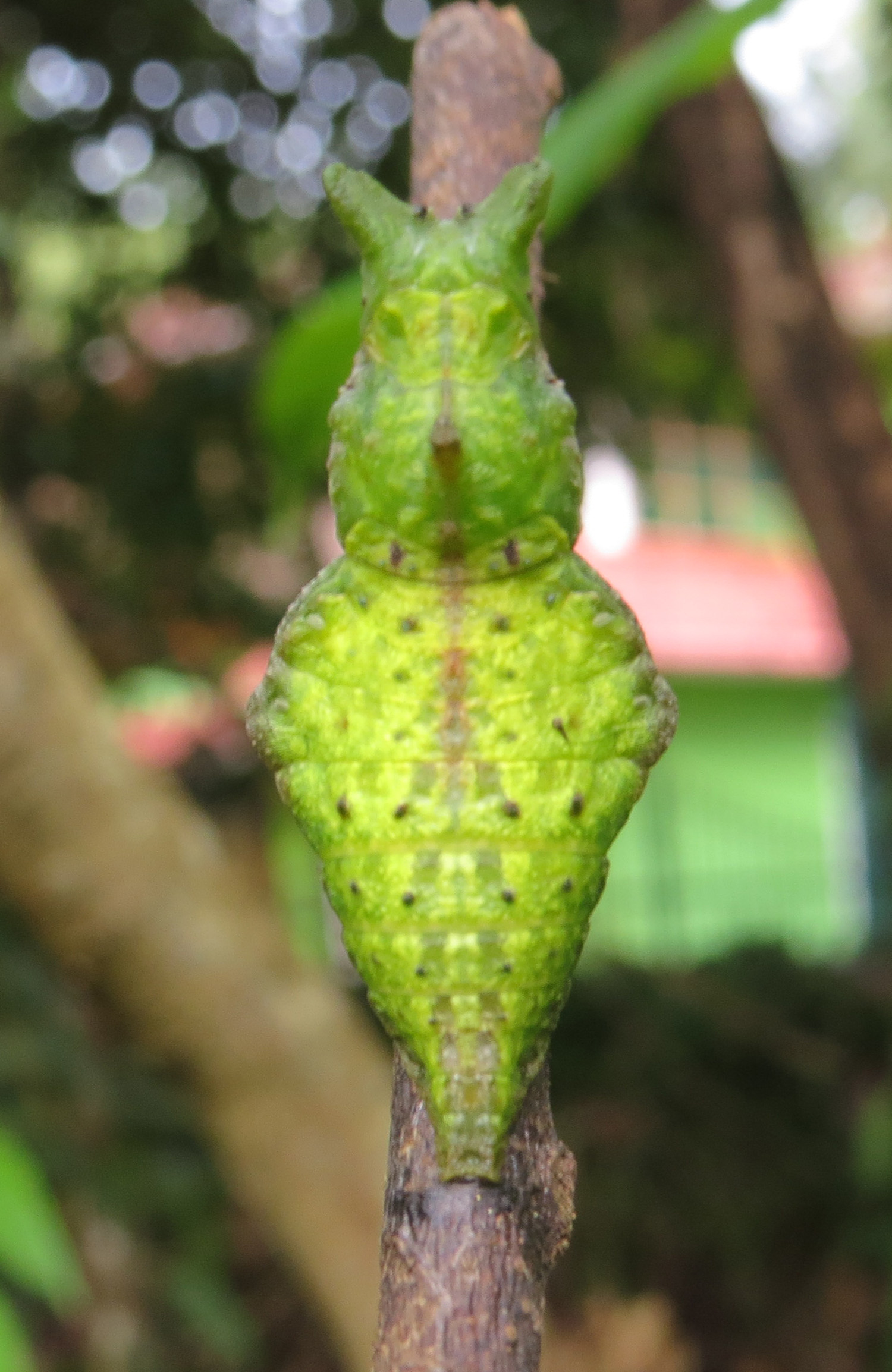
Pupa

== Food plants ==
- Glycosmis pentaphylla of the family Rutaceae. Others that have been noted include Clausena heptaphylla.

== Systematics ==
Papilio dravidarum is a member of the castor species group. The clade members are:

- Papilio castor Westwood, 1842
- Papilio dravidarum Wood-Mason, 1880
- Papilio mahadeva Moore, [1879]

== See also ==
- Papilionidae
- List of butterflies of India (Papilionidae)

== Other sources ==
- Collins, N. Mark; Morris, Michael G. (1985). Threatened Swallowtail Butterflies of the World: The IUCN Red Data Book. Gland & Cambridge: IUCN. ISBN 978-2-88032-603-6 – via Biodiversity Heritage Library.
- Evans, W.H. (1932). The Identification of Indian Butterflies (2nd ed.). Mumbai, India: Bombay Natural History Society.
- Gaonkar, Harish (1996). Butterflies of the Western Ghats, India (including Sri Lanka) - A Biodiversity Assessment of a Threatened Mountain System. Bangalore, India: Centre for Ecological Sciences.
- Gay, Thomas; Kehimkar, Isaac David; Punetha, Jagdish Chandra (1992). Common Butterflies of India. Nature Guides. Bombay, India: World Wide Fund for Nature-India by Oxford University Press. ISBN 978-0195631647.
- Kunte, Krushnamegh (2000). Butterflies of Peninsular India. India, A Lifescape. Hyderabad, India: Universities Press. ISBN 978-8173713545.
- Wynter-Blyth, Mark Alexander (1957). Butterflies of the Indian Region. Bombay, India: Bombay Natural History Society. ISBN 978-8170192329.
