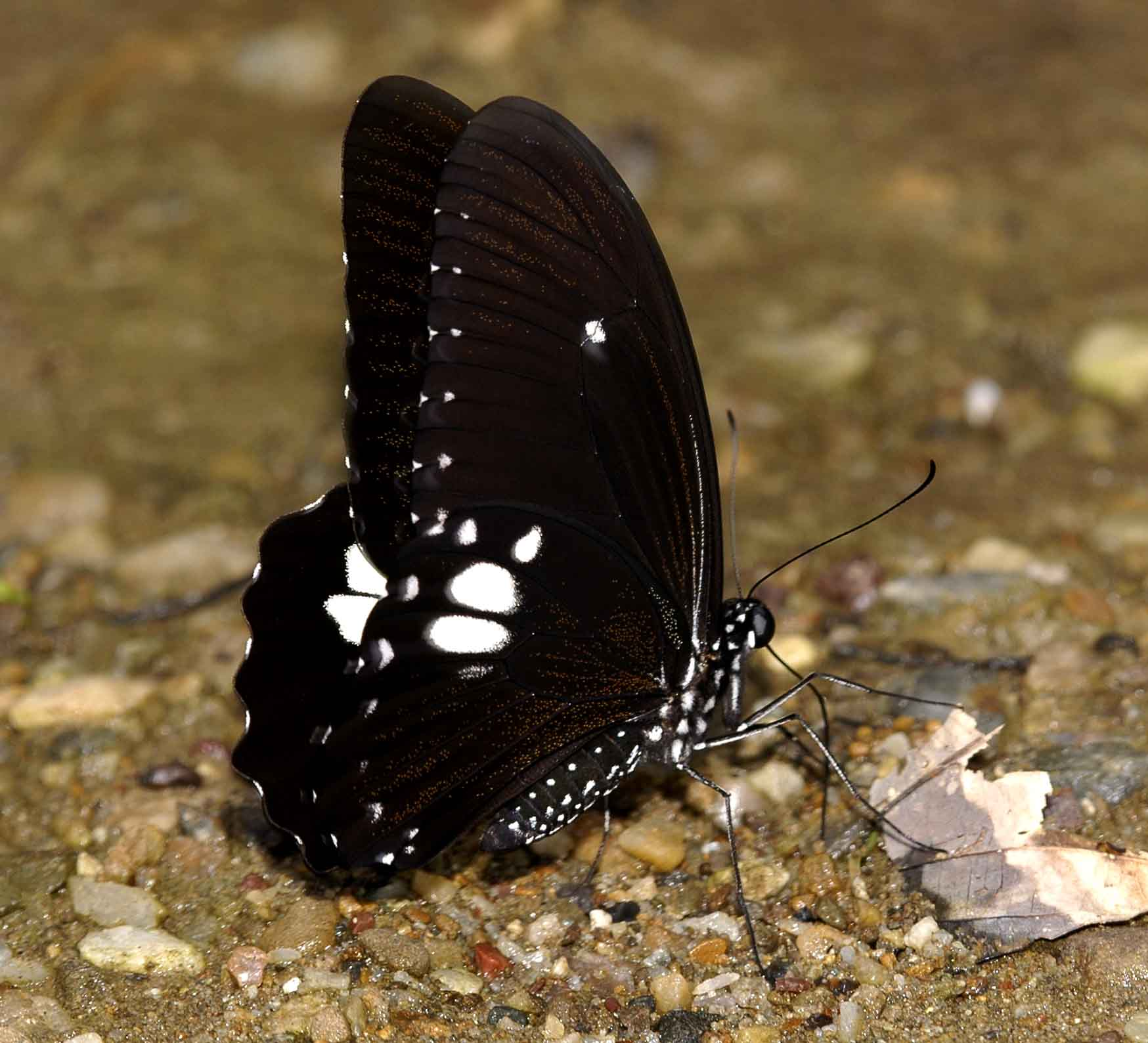

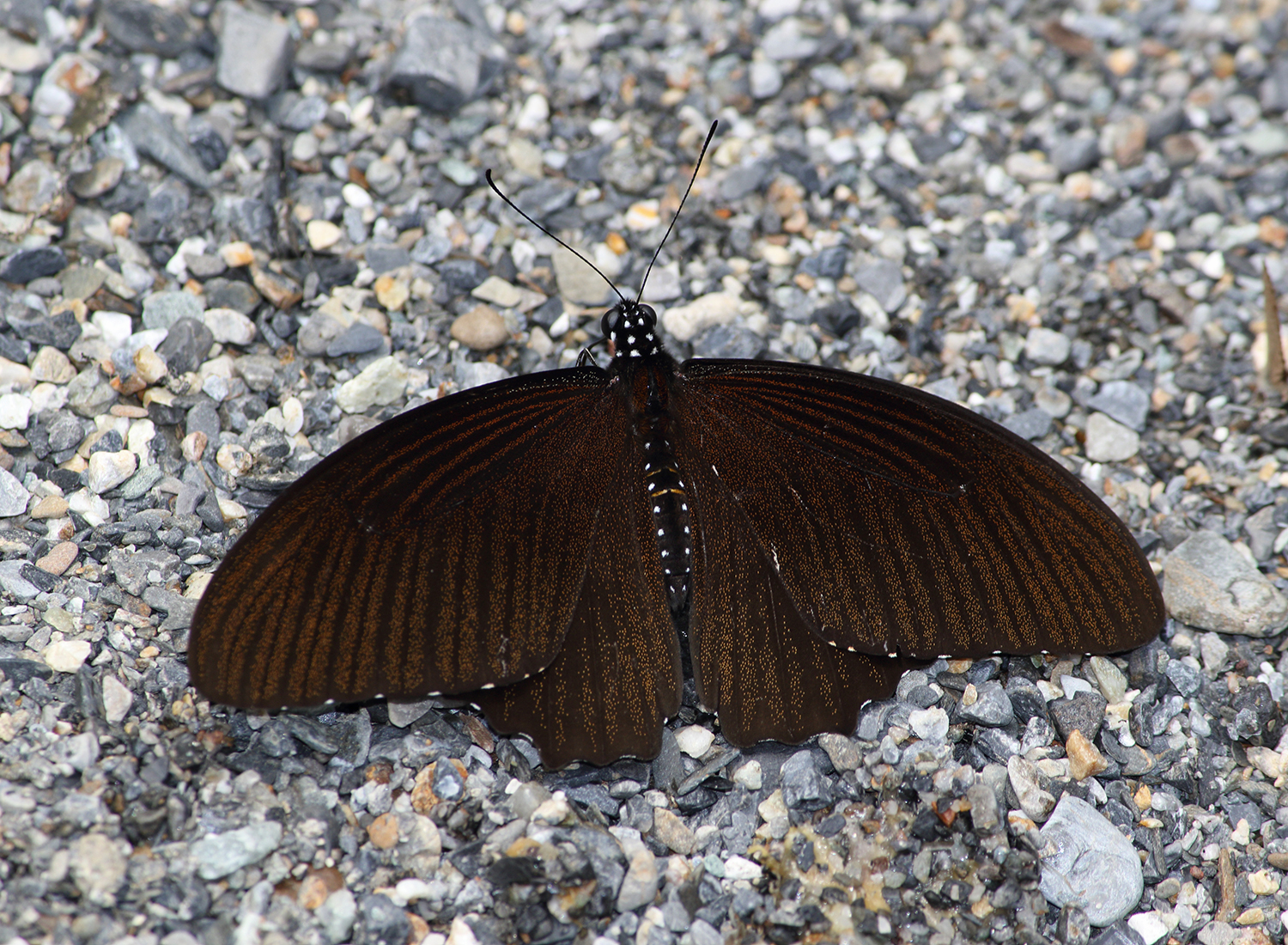

Scientific classification
- Kingdom: Animalia
- Phylum: Arthropoda
- Class: Insecta
- Order: Lepidoptera
- Family: Papilionidae
- Genus: Papilio
- Species: P. castor

Binomial name
- Papilio castor Westwood, 1842

= Papilio castor =

Common raven

Species of butterfly

Papilio castor, the common raven, is a species of swallowtail butterfly found in Cambodia and South Asia.

== Description ==
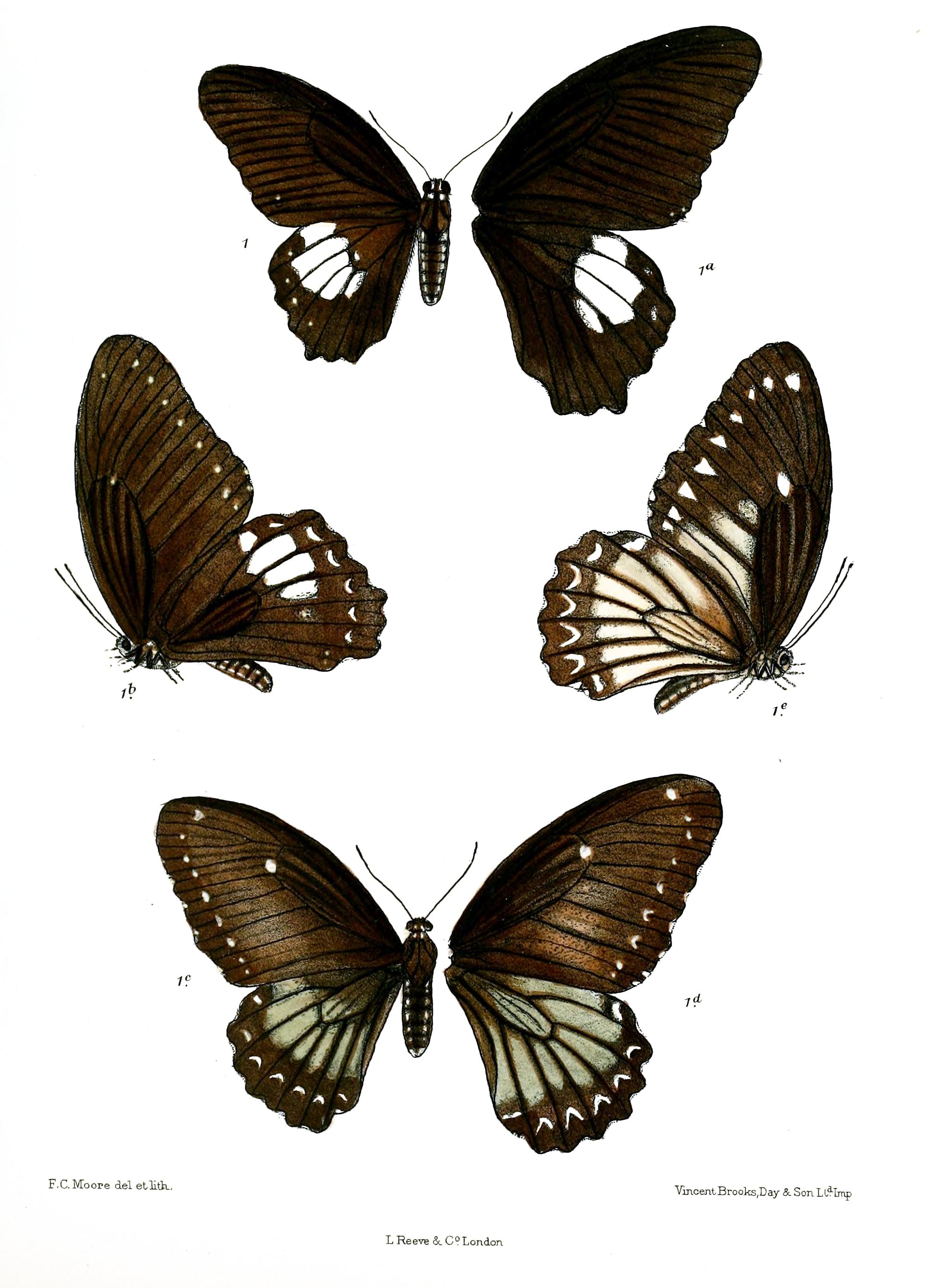

The male Papilio castor has black upper wings, more or less irrorated (sprinkled) with yellowish-brown scales that on the forewing form somewhat indistinct longitudinal cell-lines and internervular streaks. The hind wing has an upper discal cream-coloured patch composed of an oval spot in interspace 4, a more elongate mark broadened outwardly in interspace 5, a similar elongate mark in interspace 6, and a much smaller broadly oval spot above it in 7; these markings are not coalescent but are distinctly divided by the black veins. The cilia on the forewings and hind wings are black alternated with white.

The underside of the male is duller and more opaque than the upper side. Whereas, the brownish-black apical area of the forewing and base of the hind wing are thinly sprinkled with yellowish-brown scales. The underside of the forewings has a small white spot on the middle discocellular and a subterminal and terminal row of small white specks that do not extend to the costa. The markings on the hind wing are similar to those on the upper side, but smaller and more widely divided from each other by the veins which are edged with black; a subterminal, more or less well-defined series of small white lunules and a terminal series of white specks. The antenna, head, thorax and abdomen are black; the underside of the body has a spot behind the eyes and white spots and specks on the thorax and abdomen.

The upper side of the female is a duller, more opaque black than in the male and more densely irrorated with yellowish or reddish-brown scales. The forewing markings are as in the male, in addition having postdiscal and terminal series of small white spots that generally do not extend to the costal margin. The hind wing has a discal series of diffuse broad whitish streaks in the interspaces that extend into the apex of the cell, followed by a complete transverse curved subterminal series of white lunules; the ground colour beyond each lunule is devoid of the irroration of yellowish-brown scales; this gives the appearance of a row of terminal black spots impressed on the wing. The cilia are black alternated with white. The underside is similar, with the white markings being larger and more prominent. The forewing has diffuse whitish streaks in interspaces la, 1 and 2, and the subterminal and terminal series of white spots complete. The hind wing has diffuse whitish streaks that extend up to the base of the wing. The antennae are black; the head, thorax and abdomen are dull brown spotted with white.

=== Race mehala, Grose-Smith ===
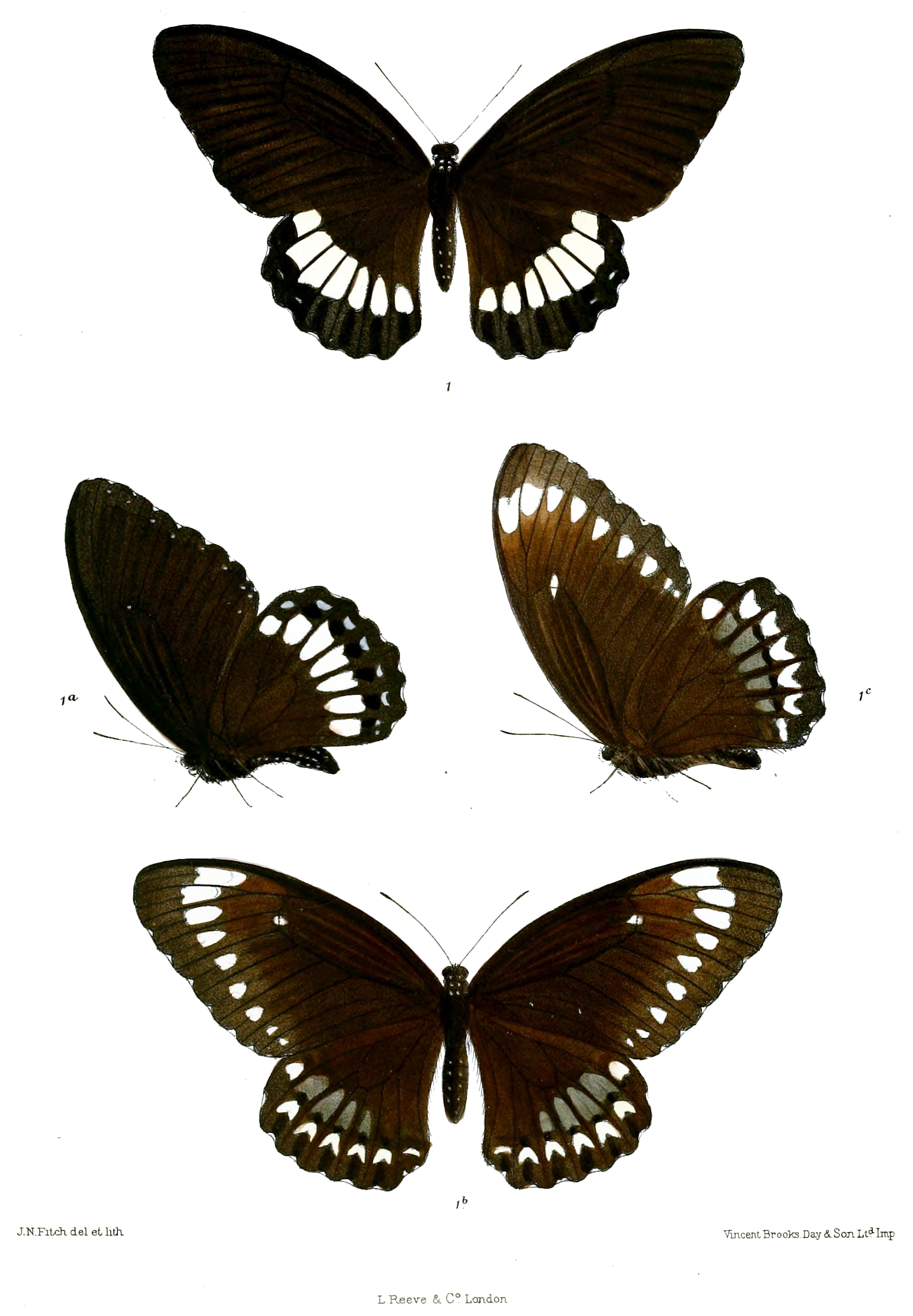
mehala

The upper side of the male is a velvety dark brown; there is a minute white spot on the middle discocellular and a series of terminal white specks in each interspace. The hind wing has a discal series of seven elongate, more or less inwardly conical, outwardly emarginate cream-coloured spots, followed by a subterminal series of lunular small white spots. The cilia are black, alternated with white in the interspaces. The underside is brownish-black, with similar markings. The forewing has a terminal series of white specks elongated inwards. The markings on the hind wing are somewhat larger. The antennae, head, thorax, and abdomen are brownish black; the head, thorax and abdomen are speckled with white.

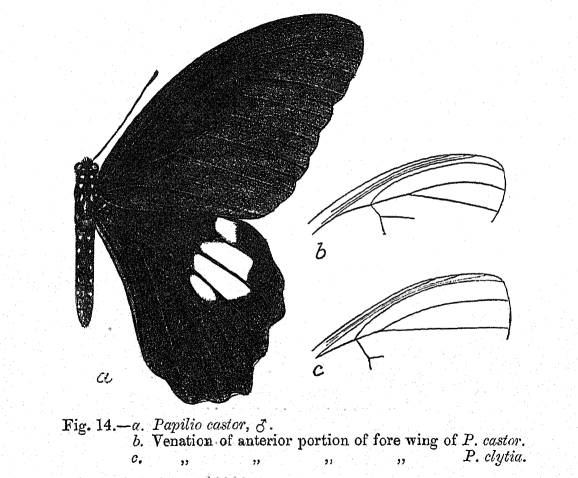

The female is similar to the male but has a subterminal series of white spots on the upper side of the forewing, sometimes with the anterior ones enlarged, sometimes with the series incomplete. The hind wing is as in the male.

== Distribution ==
Northeast India and into Myanmar, Bangladesh and Southeast Asia.

== Systematics ==
Papilio castor is the nominate member of the castor species group. The clade members are:

- Papilio castor Westwood, 1842
- Papilio dravidarum Wood-Mason, 1880
- Papilio mahadeva Moore, [1879]

== See also ==
- Papilionidae
- List of butterflies of India (Papilionidae)

== Other reading ==
- Collins, N. Mark; Morris, Michael G. (1985). Threatened Swallowtail Butterflies of the World: The IUCN Red Data Book. Gland & Cambridge: IUCN. ISBN 978-2-88032-603-6 – via Biodiversity Heritage Library.
- Evans, W.H. (1932). The Identification of Indian Butterflies (2nd ed.). Mumbai, India: Bombay Natural History Society.
- Haribal, Meena (1992). The Butterflies of Sikkim Himalaya and Their Natural History. Gangtok, Sikkim, India: Sikkim Nature Conservation Foundation.
- Wynter-Blyth, Mark Alexander (1957). Butterflies of the Indian Region. Bombay, India: Bombay Natural History Society. ISBN 978-8170192329.
