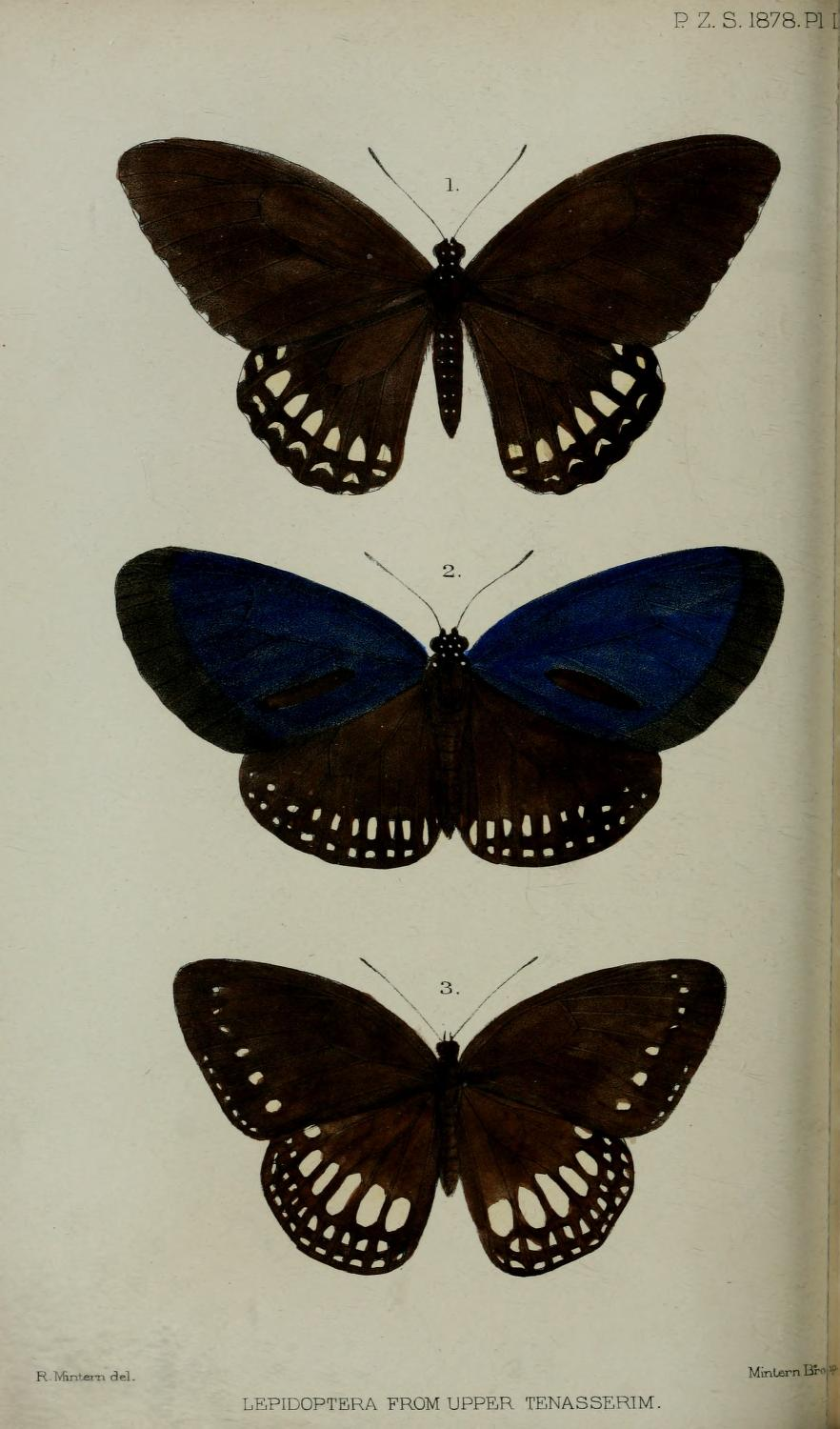
- Moore's figure in Proceedings of the Zoological Society - Papilio mahadeva is figure 1

Scientific classification
- Kingdom: Animalia
- Phylum: Arthropoda
- Clade: Pancrustacea
- Class: Insecta
- Order: Lepidoptera
- Family: Papilionidae
- Genus: Papilio
- Species: P. mahadeva

Binomial name
- Papilio mahadeva Moore, [1879]

Synonyms
- Papilio mahadevus; Papilio mahadeva maheswara Jordan, 1909; Papilio mehala Grose-Smith, 1886; Papilio selangoranus Fruhstorfer, 1901

= Papilio mahadeva =

Burmese raven

Species of butterfly

Papilio mahadeva, the Burmese raven, is a species of swallowtail butterfly from the genus Papilio that is found in Thailand, Burma and Guangxi.

mahadeva Moore (= maheswara Fruhst.) (31 d). Nominate.Male: the hindwing always with a complete row of discal patches, of which the anterior ones are less enlarged than in mehala [now subspecies] and castor, the submarginal spots likewise all developed. The female marked similarly to the male the forewing the discocellular spot and the submarginal spots larger, on the hindwing the discal spots shaded with brown. Upper Tenasserim, Shan States, Siam and the east side of the Malay Peninsula. Very similar to P. dravidarum, but easy to distinguish by the small submarginal spots of the forewing.

== Subspecies ==
- Papilio mahadeva mahadeva (Thailand)
- Papilio mahadeva mehala Grose-Smith, 1886 (Burma) Male without distinctly projecting tooth at the 3. radial of the hindwing; the submarginal spots of this wing well developed also above; the 2.—4. discal patches larger than the following ones, the latter often absent. Female on the forewing with a complete row of submarginal spots, of which the anterior ones are the largest; on the hindwing a row of grey, somewhat diffuse discal patches and a row of large white submarginal lunules. Lower Burma and the adjoining districts of Tenasserim.
- Papilio mahadeva selangoranus Fruhstorfer, 1901 (northern Peninsular Malaya) "In the Museum at Singapore are 2 specimens from Selangore which have no submarginal spots on the upperside of the hindwing and have been named selangoranus by Fruhstorfer"
- Papilio mahadeva choui Li, 1994 (Guangxi)

== Biology ==
Papilio mahadeva is a mimic of Euploea core. Recorded larval food plants are species of Glycosmis including Glycosmis pentaphylla and Glycosmis citrifolia.

== Habitat ==
It lives in lowland dipterocarp forests and forest edges at up to 500 m.

== Systematics ==
Papilio mahadeva is a member of the castor species group. The clade members are:

- Papilio castor Westwood, 1842
- Papilio dravidarum Wood-Mason, 1880
- Papilio mahadeva Moore, [1879]
