= Leichhardt pine =

Leichhardt pine can refer to two species of trees:

- Neolamarckia cadamba, the kadam tree
- Nauclea orientalis, the Leichhardt tree or the yellow cheesewood
