= Opepe =

Opepe mey refer to:

- Bilinga (wood), an African tropical hardwood that is also called Opepe
- Opepe, New Zealand, a former settlement, site of a clash between European militia and rebels in 1869
