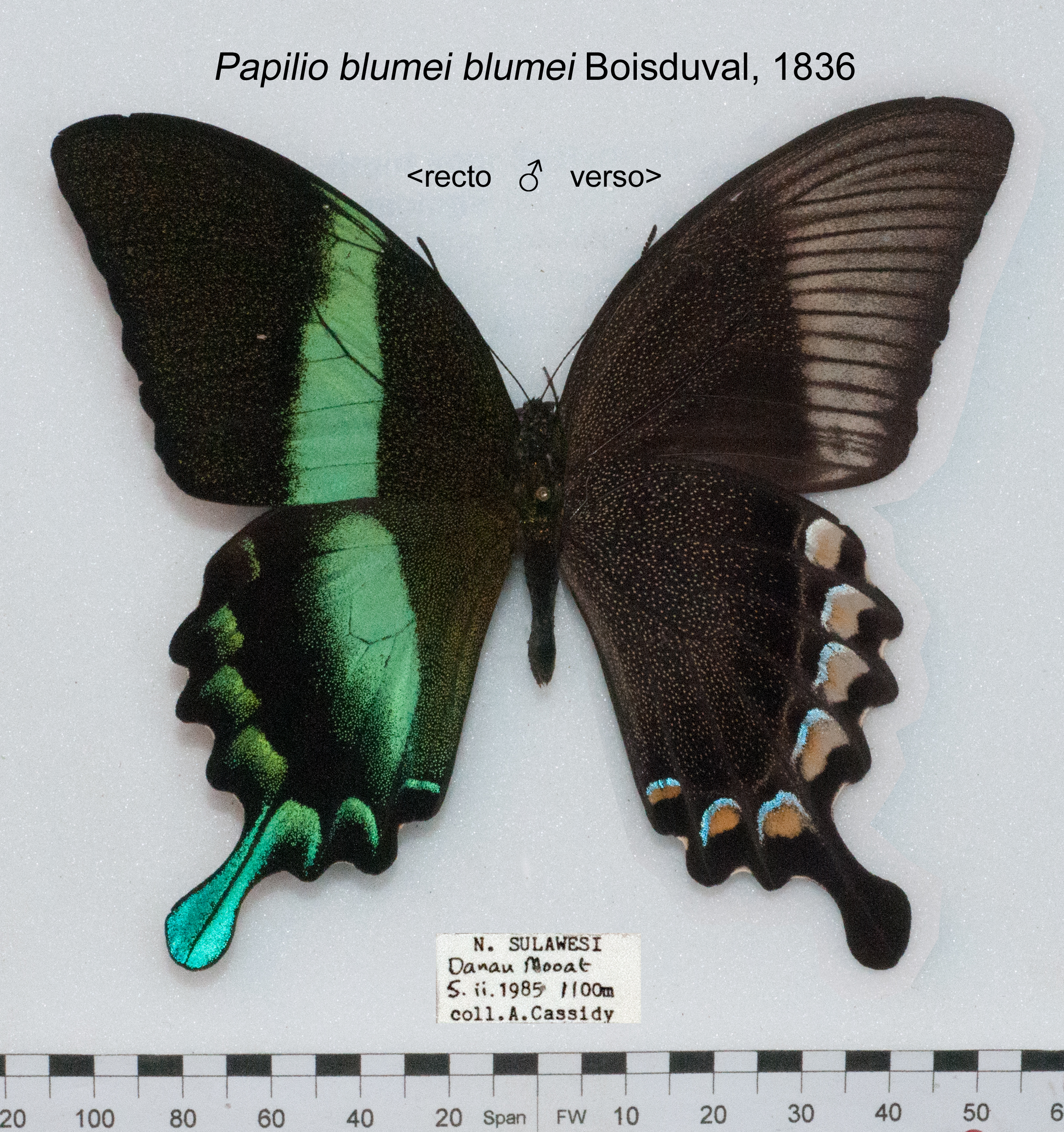

Scientific classification
- Kingdom: Animalia
- Phylum: Arthropoda
- Clade: Pancrustacea
- Class: Insecta
- Order: Lepidoptera
- Family: Papilionidae
- Genus: Papilio
- Species: P. blumei

Binomial name
- Papilio blumei Boisduval, 1836

Synonyms
- Papilio fruhstorferi Röber, 1897

= Papilio blumei =

Species of butterfly

Papilio blumei, the green peacock or green swallowtail, is a butterfly of the family Papilionidae. It is found only on the Indonesian island of Sulawesi.

== Description ==
The wingspan of P. blumei is 120–140 mm (4.7–5.5 in). The imago has a wingspan of 10 to 12 cm[1]. On the obverse, the wings have a black background colour. The forewings have a broad, iridescent transverse stripe, which appears emerald green when viewed from the front and blue when viewed from the side. The base and the submarginal part of the wing are sprinkled with green scales. The hindwings have a spatula-shaped tail, which appears turquoise blue when viewed from the front and purplish blue when viewed from the side, with a black line in the middle. The hindwings also have a band of the same colour as the forewings, a series of submarginal lunulae, also of the same colour, and are sprinkled with green scales in the basal part. On the reverse the wings are black. The forewings have lighter scales in the intervenous spaces of the submarginal part. The rest of the wing is sprinkled with lighter scales. The hindwings have a series of pale orange submarginal macules surmounted by iridescent blue lunulae and are sprinkled with lighter scales in the basal part. The tail is black. In females, the bands of the forewings and hindwings of the obverse may be narrower than in males. In both sexes the body is black, sprinkled with iridescent green scales on top.

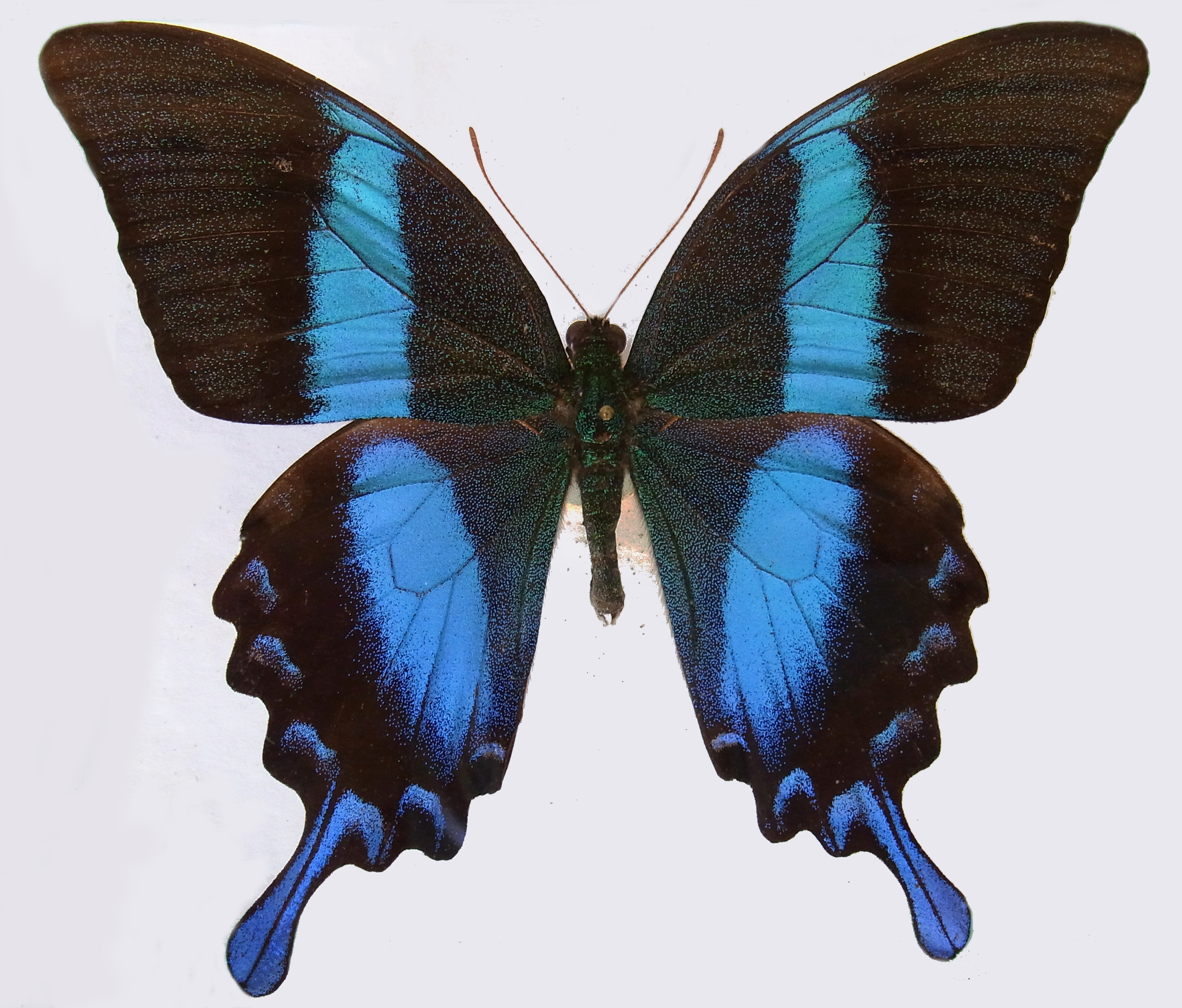
male

== Description in Seitz ==
P. blumei. One of the most beautiful Papilios. Larger than Papilio palinurus daedalus, the upper surface similarly marked, but the band green-blue and the tail with the exception of the vein and the margins likewise blue. The yellowish grey distal band of the forewing beneath very broad, proximally straight or slightly curved; the yellow submarginal spots of the hindwing all very large, proximally margined with blue. Many males have one or several very narrow pilose stripes on the upperside of the forewing. The ground-colour of the female is paler than in the male and usually the blue band is narrower. Only known from Celebes; rare in the south of the island. commoner in the north. — blumei Bdv. (36 a) is the northerly form. In the male the band of the forewing entirely or almost entirely fills up the apex of the cell and in the female the part of the apex of the cell which is not blue is much narrower than the band. — In fruhstorferi Rob., from South Celebes, the band of the forewing is placed at some distance from the apex of the cell, so that basally to the lower radial its distal margin enters the cell and the black apical part of the cell is at least half as broad as the band; moreover in both sexes the light distal area of the forewing beneath is broader and the basal area of both wings more thickly dusted with yellowish. Karl Jordan in Seitz.

== Biology ==
The female lays her eggs on the host plant. The host plants used are probably plants of the genera Euodia and Toddalia. Adults feed on the nectar of flowers. They have been observed feeding mainly on the flowers of Nauclea latifolia and various species of the genus Eugenia

== Distribution and habitat ==
Papilio blumei is endemic to Sulawesi in the Australasian realm inhabiting forest.

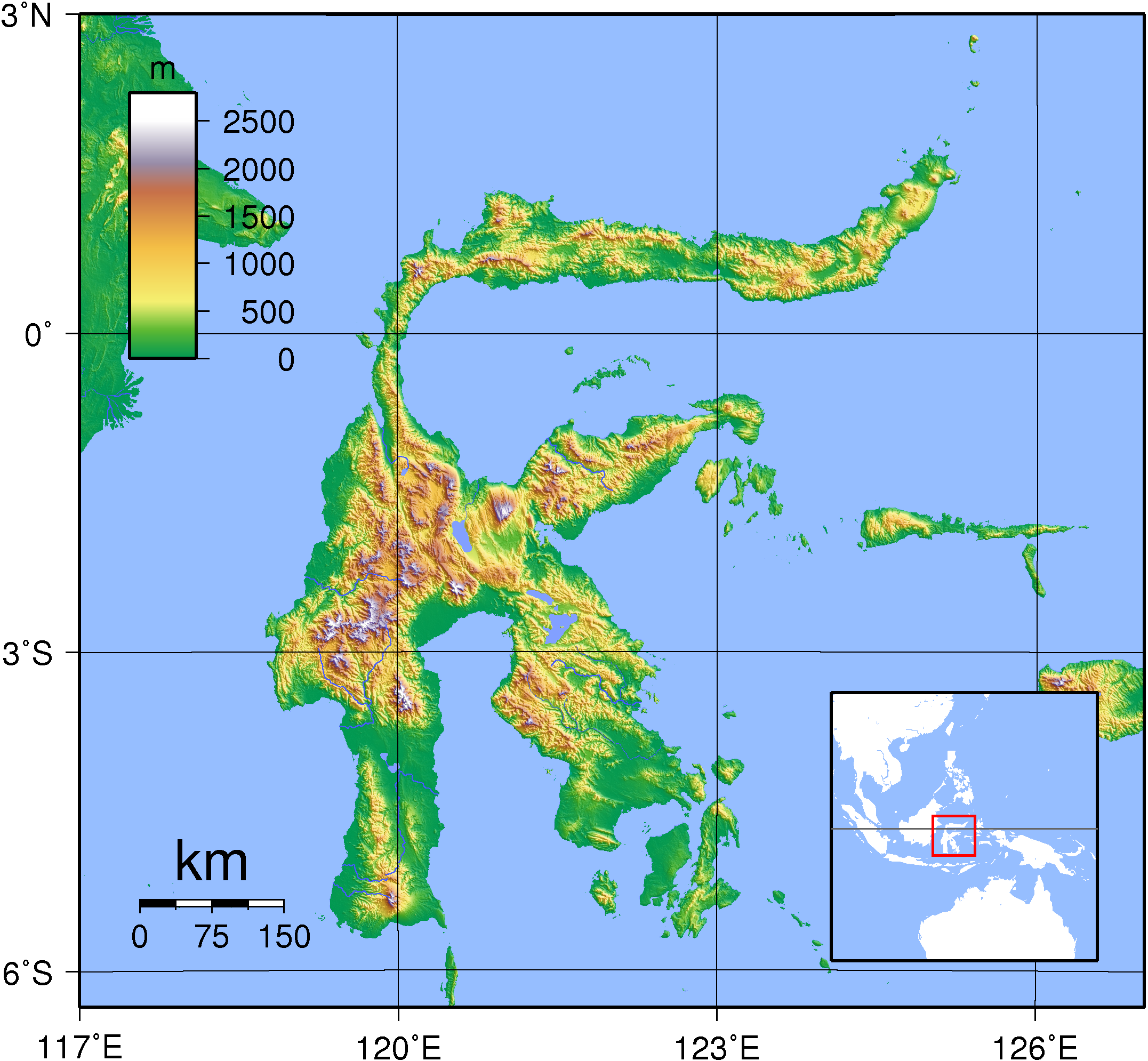
Topography and placement

== Subspecies ==
There are two recognised subspecies:

- Papilio blumei blumei (northern Sulawesi)
- Papilio blumei fruhstorferi Röber, 1897 (southern Sulawesi)

== Protection ==
It is protected in Bantimurung – Bulusaraung National Park.

== Taxonomy ==
Papilio blumei was first described by Boisduval in 1836 in his Histoire naturelle des insectes (Natural History of Insects), from a male specimen supposed, wrongly, to come from Ambon. The species is named in honour of Carl Ludwig Blume. It is a member of species group palinurus

== Philately ==
This butterfly appears on several stamps, including on a 1963 Indonesian issue (face value: 1.75 + 0.50 r), on another Indonesian issue from 1993 and on a Moldovan stamp from 2013.

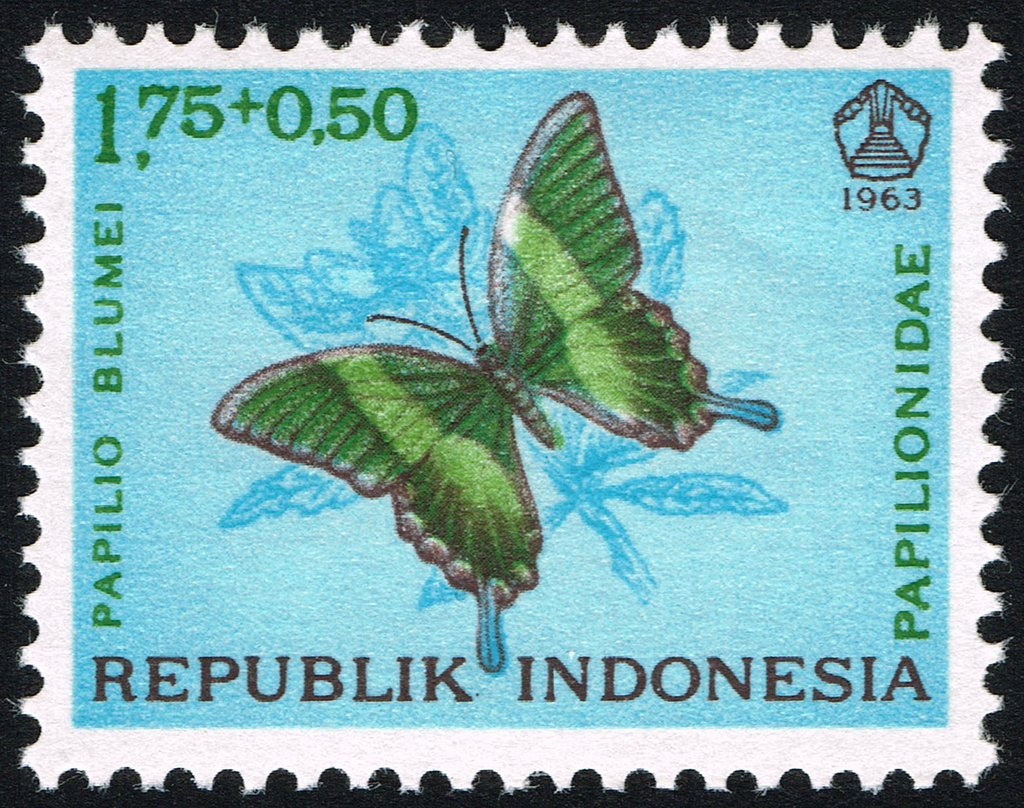
Stamp of Indonesia 1963

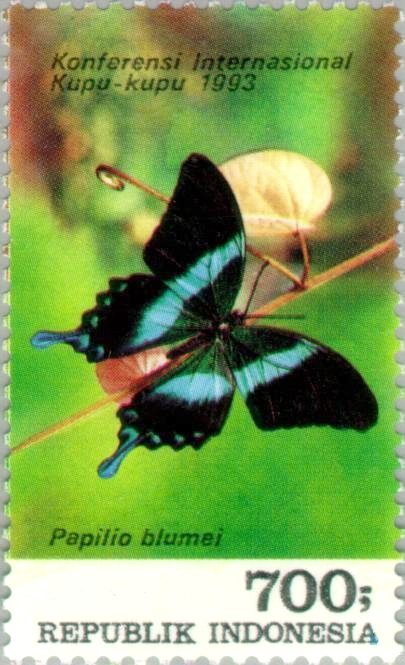
Stamp of Indonesia 1993

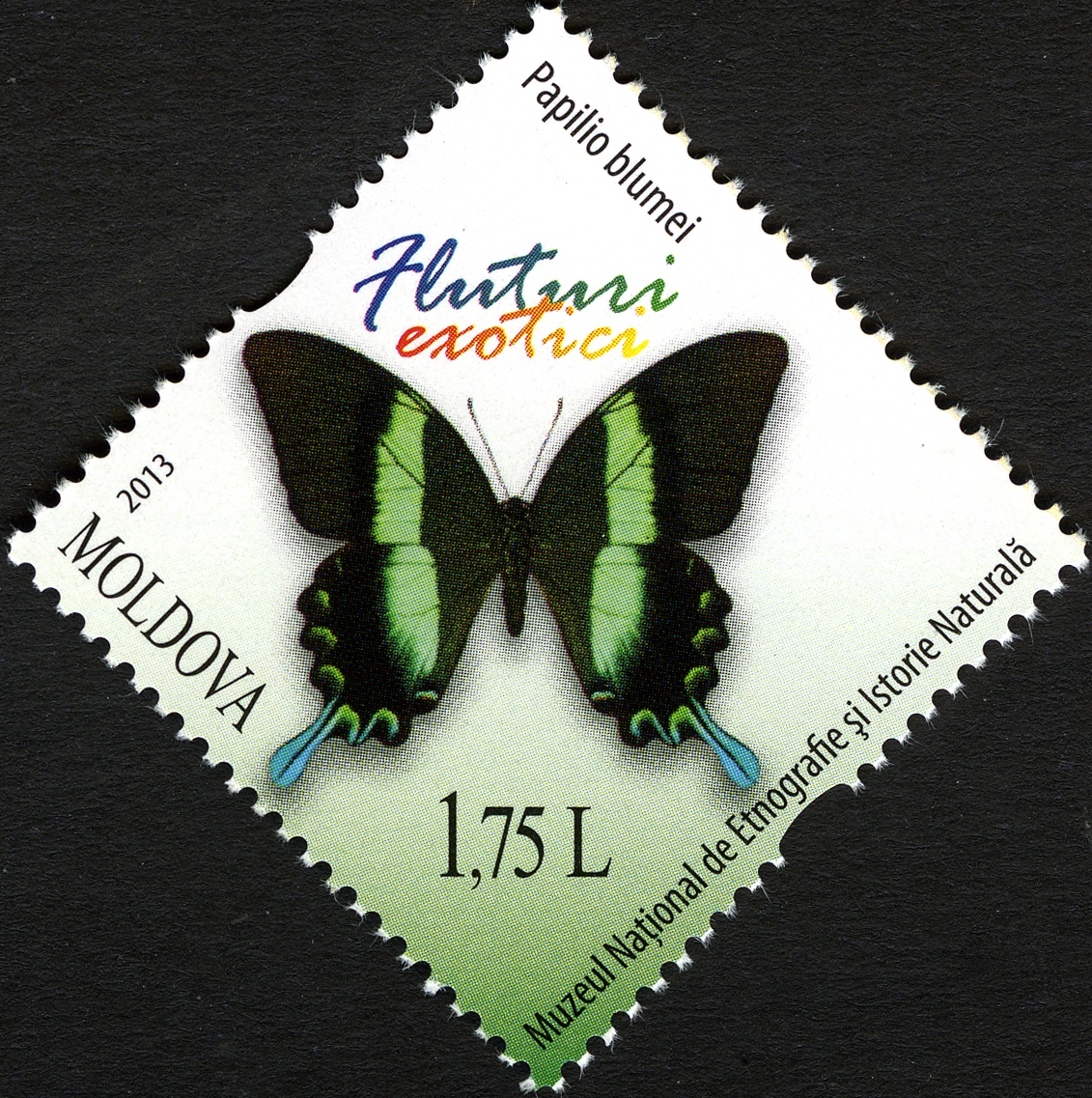
Stamps of Moldova 2013

== Color ==
The colors on the wings of these butterflies are metallic and are eye catching especially when viewed from a particular angle. The remarkable feature of this butterfly's wing is that it contains rows of very small concave surfaces that reflect light in many ways. For instance, the center of the concave surface reflects a yellow-green light and the edges reflect a blue light. At the center of the concavity, light is reflected directly but when light hits the edges, it bounces off into forming many layers, which amplifies and rotates the waves of light. The final blend is known as structural colour due to the complexity by which it is produced.

== Technological inspiration ==
Researchers have taken about ten years to recreate a simplified replica of the surface of the butterfly's wing. They hope that such technology will result in bank notes and credit cards that are difficult to forge and also that it will lead to solar cells being more efficient at gathering energy from the sun.

Yet it is challenging to duplicate the surface of a butterfly's wing. Professor Ullrich Steiner of Cambridge University's Nanoscience Centre states that, "Despite the detailed scientific understanding of optics, the astonishingly varied colour palette found in nature often surpasses the optical effects that can be generated by technological means".

== Other reading ==
- Erich Bauer and Thomas Frankenbach, 1998 Schmetterlinge der Erde, Butterflies of the world Part I (1), Papilionidae Papilionidae I: Papilio, Subgenus Achillides, Bhutanitis, Teinopalpus. Edited by Erich Bauer and Thomas Frankenbach. Keltern: Goecke & Evers; Canterbury: Hillside Books ISBN 9783931374624
