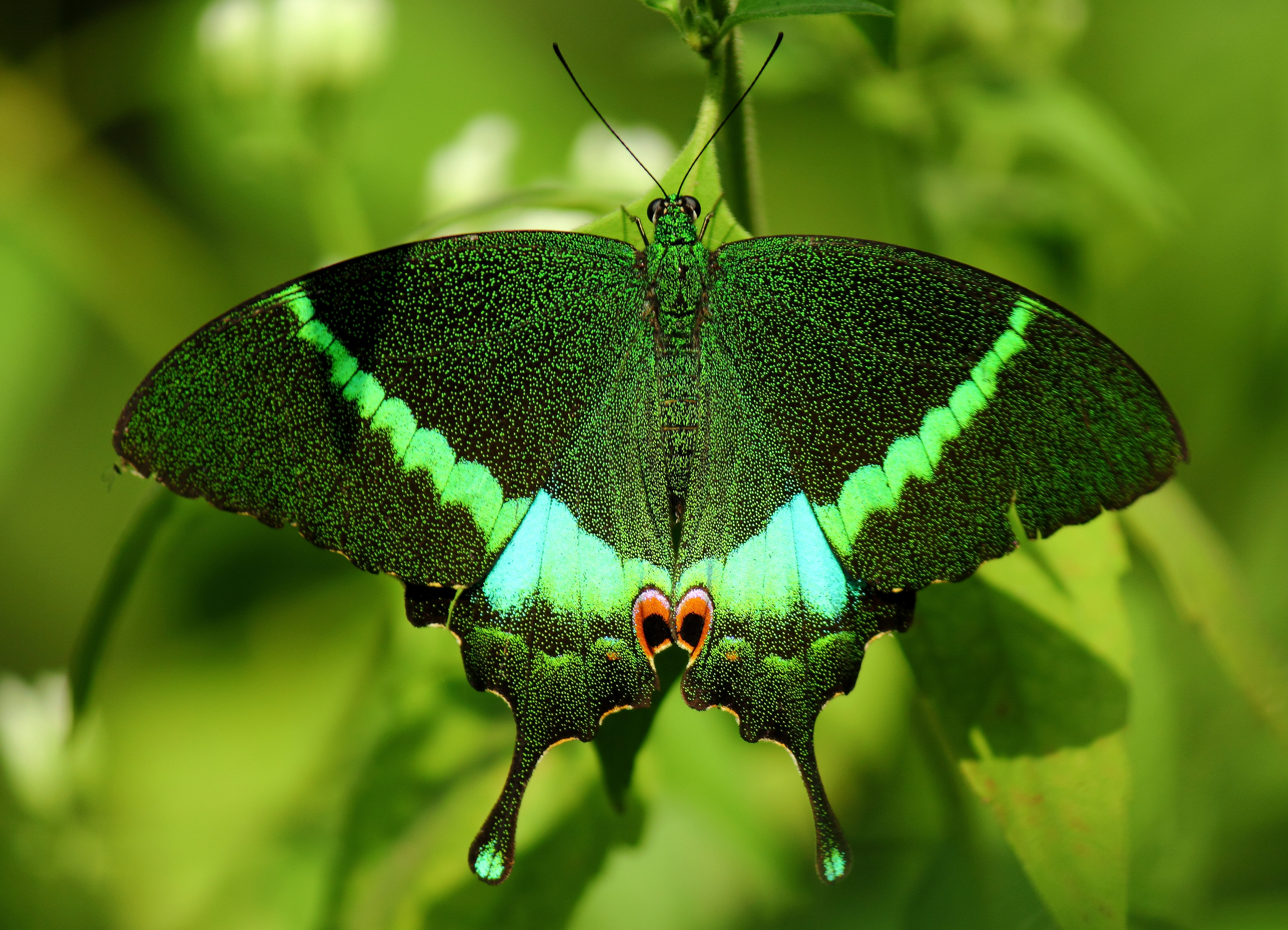
- in Burdwan, West Bengal
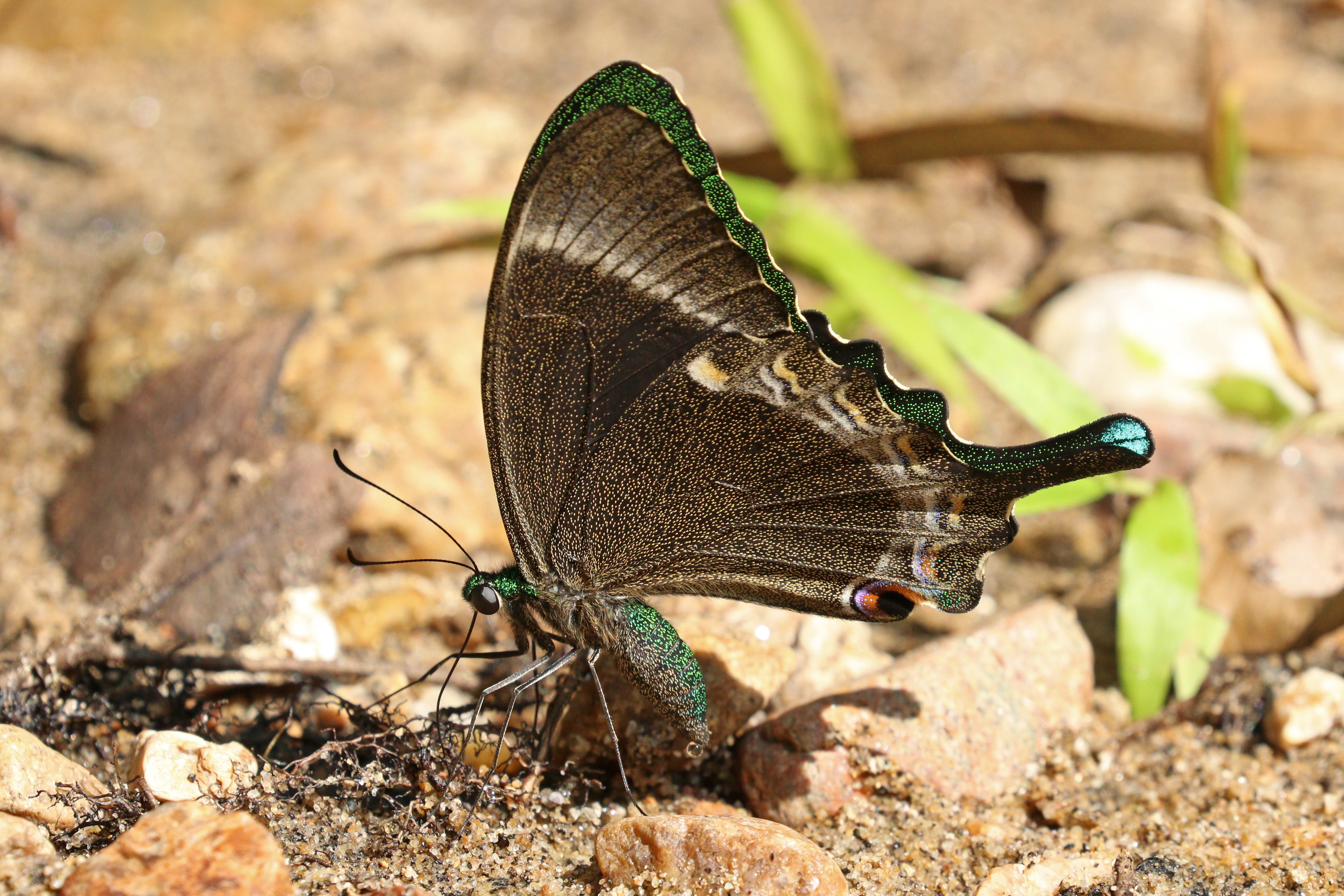
- in Chinnar Wildlife Sanctuary, Kerala

Scientific classification
- Kingdom: Animalia
- Phylum: Arthropoda
- Class: Insecta
- Order: Lepidoptera
- Family: Papilionidae
- Genus: Papilio
- Species: P. crino

Binomial name
- Papilio crino Fabricius, 1792

= Papilio crino =

Common banded peacock

Species of butterfly

Papilio crino, the common banded peacock, is a species of swallowtail (Papilionidae) butterfly found in parts of the Indian subcontinent, including India, Nepal, Bhutan and Sri Lanka.

== Description ==
This species resembles Papilio palinurus, but the male generally has, on the upperside of the outer half of the forewing, cottony or hairy scent-streaks similar to those in Papilio polyctor, only the streak in interspace 1 is always missing. Other differences are seen in the upper wing. The forewing has the discal transverse bluish-green band slightly sinuous, narrower, more curved than in P. palinurus and more distinctly decreasing in width towards the costal margin; in the female it is more sinuous than in the male. The hindwing has the transverse bluish-green band very variable in width but the inner margin is much straighter than in P. polyctor; this band that in P. polyctor stops short of vein 7, continues to the costal margin, it is however much and abruptly narrowed above vein 7; tornal ocellus claret-red with a large black centre inwardly edged with blue; the bright ochraceous subapical lunule of P. polyctor replaced by a dull whitish spot; the subterminal diffuse green lunules restricted to interspaces 2,3 and 4; the spatular apex of the tail with a small patch of bluish-green scales.

On the underside of the wings the ground colour is dull pale brown to blackish brown irrorated (sprinkled) with scattered yellowish scales, which, however, on the forewing are absent from a large triangular discal patch that lies between the dorsum, the median vein, vein 5 and a line of white lunules that crosses the wing in an outward curve from the upper third of the costa to just before the tornus; these white lunules are outwardly diffuse and merge gradually into the brown ground colour. In the hindwing, the tornal ocellus much as on the upperside; an obscure ill-defined highly arched postdiscal narrow whitish band from above the tornal ocellus to the costa, ends near apex of interspace 7 in a broad white lunule; beyond this a double subterminal row of somewhat straight ochreous-white lunules in the interspaces, each lunule of the inner row bordered outwardly with blue, this bordering very faint in many specimens. Cilia of both forewings and hindwings brown alternated with white. Antennae, head, thorax and abdomen dark brownish black; the head, thorax and abdomen above with a sprinkling of glittering green scales.

Expanse: 100–116 mm

== Distribution ==
Lower Bengal; forested parts of central and southern India (including Kerala); Sri Lanka.

== Life history ==
=== Egg ===
The female lays eggs on leaves of the satinwood tree Chloroxylon swietenia.

=== Larva ===
"Somewhat limaciform; anterior segments convexly scutellated; furnished with a pair of short fleshy tubercles on anterior and two on anal segments."

=== Pupa ===
"Curved backward anteriorly; head broad in front; green"

=== Adult ===
The butterfly is solitary and a fast flyer. It flies high above and forages on the trees (e.g., creeper blooms on bamboo). However, occasionally it is attracted to bright flowers of plants on the ground as well (e.g., dwarf red Ixora). It flutters in a hurry while sipping nectar.

It is distinguished due to its colour which is shiny fluorescent blue or green depending on the angle of observation. The magnificent colours are due to scales in interior of its wings. Also there are spots in the bottom of its hindwings similar to eyespots. The exterior of wings is brownish black with patterns similar to eyespots. Perhaps the only protection for this species is self-mimicry through the eyespots as regards to its morphology, considering its bright peacock colours and its fast flight.

== Taxonomy ==
It is a member of species group palinurus.

== See also ==
- Papilionidae
- List of butterflies of India
- List of butterflies of India (Papilionidae)

== General reading ==
- Erich Bauer and Thomas Frankenbach, 1998 Schmetterlinge der Erde, Butterflies of the world Part I (1), Papilionidae Papilionidae I: Papilio, Subgenus Achillides, Bhutanitis, Teinopalpus. Edited by Erich Bauer and Thomas Frankenbach. Keltern: Goecke & Evers; Canterbury: Hillside Books ISBN 9783931374624
- Collins, N. Mark; Morris, Michael G. (1985). Threatened Swallowtail Butterflies of the World: The IUCN Red Data Book. Gland & Cambridge: IUCN. ISBN 978-2-88032-603-6 – via Biodiversity Heritage Library.
- Evans, W.H. (1932). The Identification of Indian Butterflies (2nd ed.). Mumbai, India: Bombay Natural History Society.
- Gaonkar, Harish (1996). Butterflies of the Western Ghats, India (including Sri Lanka) - A Biodiversity Assessment of a Threatened Mountain System. Bangalore, India: Centre for Ecological Sciences.
- Gay, Thomas; Kehimkar, Isaac David; Punetha, Jagdish Chandra (1992). Common Butterflies of India. Nature Guides. Bombay, India: World Wide Fund for Nature-India by Oxford University Press. ISBN 978-0195631647.
- Kunte, Krushnamegh (2000). Butterflies of Peninsular India. India, A Lifescape. Hyderabad, India: Universities Press. ISBN 978-8173713545.
- Wynter-Blyth, Mark Alexander (1957). Butterflies of the Indian Region. Bombay, India: Bombay Natural History Society. ISBN 978-8170192329.
