= Nauclea nyasica =

Scientific classification
- Kingdom: Plantae
- Clade: Tracheophytes
- Clade: Angiosperms
- Clade: Eudicots
- Clade: Asterids
- Order: Gentianales
- Family: Rubiaceae
- Genus: Nauclea
- Species: N. nyasica

Binomial name
- Nauclea nyasica (Hoyle) Å.Krüger & Löfstrand

Genus of plants

Nauclea nyasica is a species of flowering plants in the family Rubiaceae. It was originally described as Burttdavya nyasica by Hoyle in 1936 as the only species in the genus Burttdayva. The species (and genus) was transferred to Nauclea in 2014. It is a large tree found in Tanzania, Malawi, and Mozambique.
