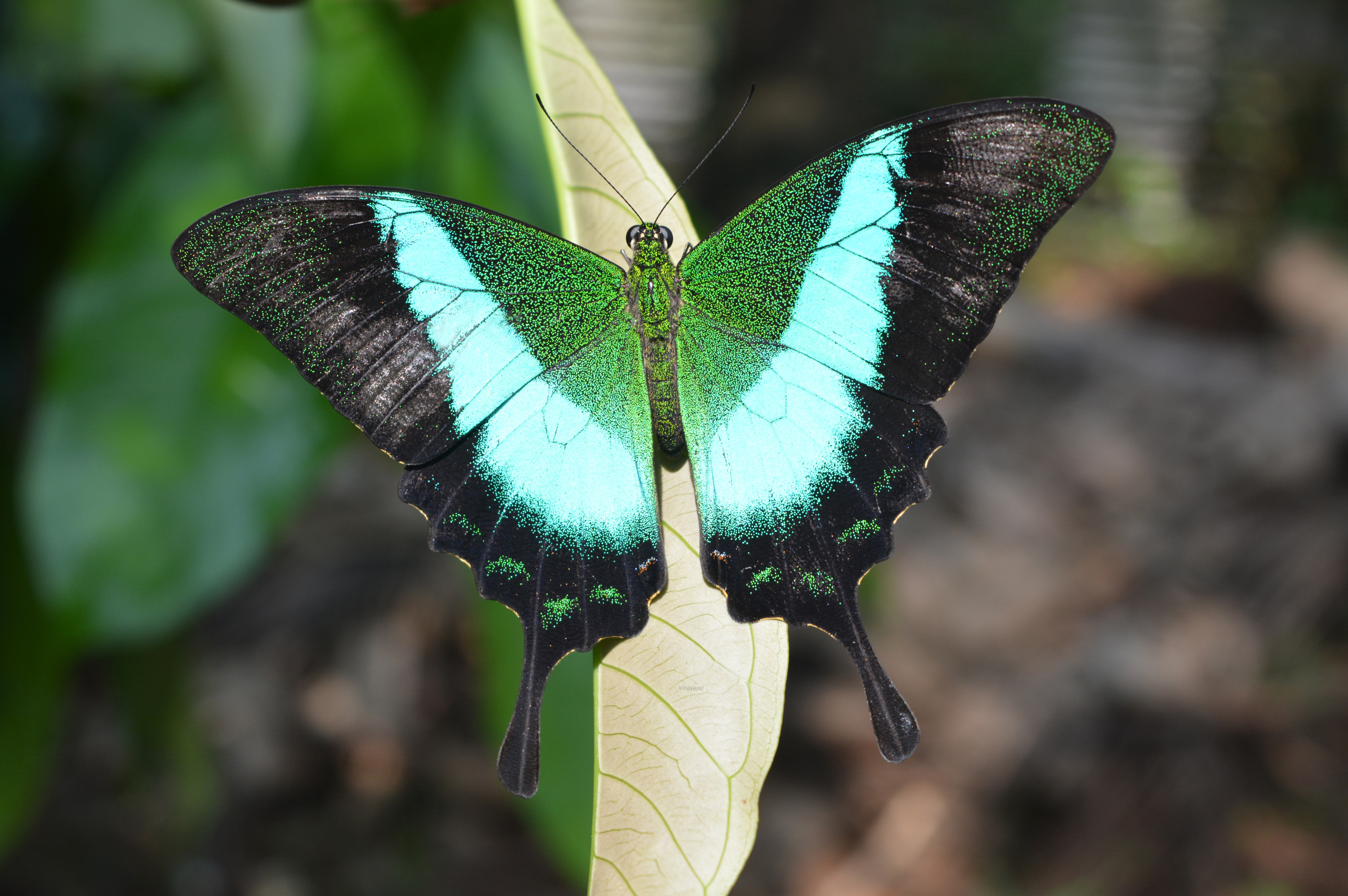

Scientific classification
- Kingdom: Animalia
- Phylum: Arthropoda
- Class: Insecta
- Order: Lepidoptera
- Family: Papilionidae
- Genus: Papilio
- Species: P. buddha

Binomial name
- Papilio buddha Westwood, 1872
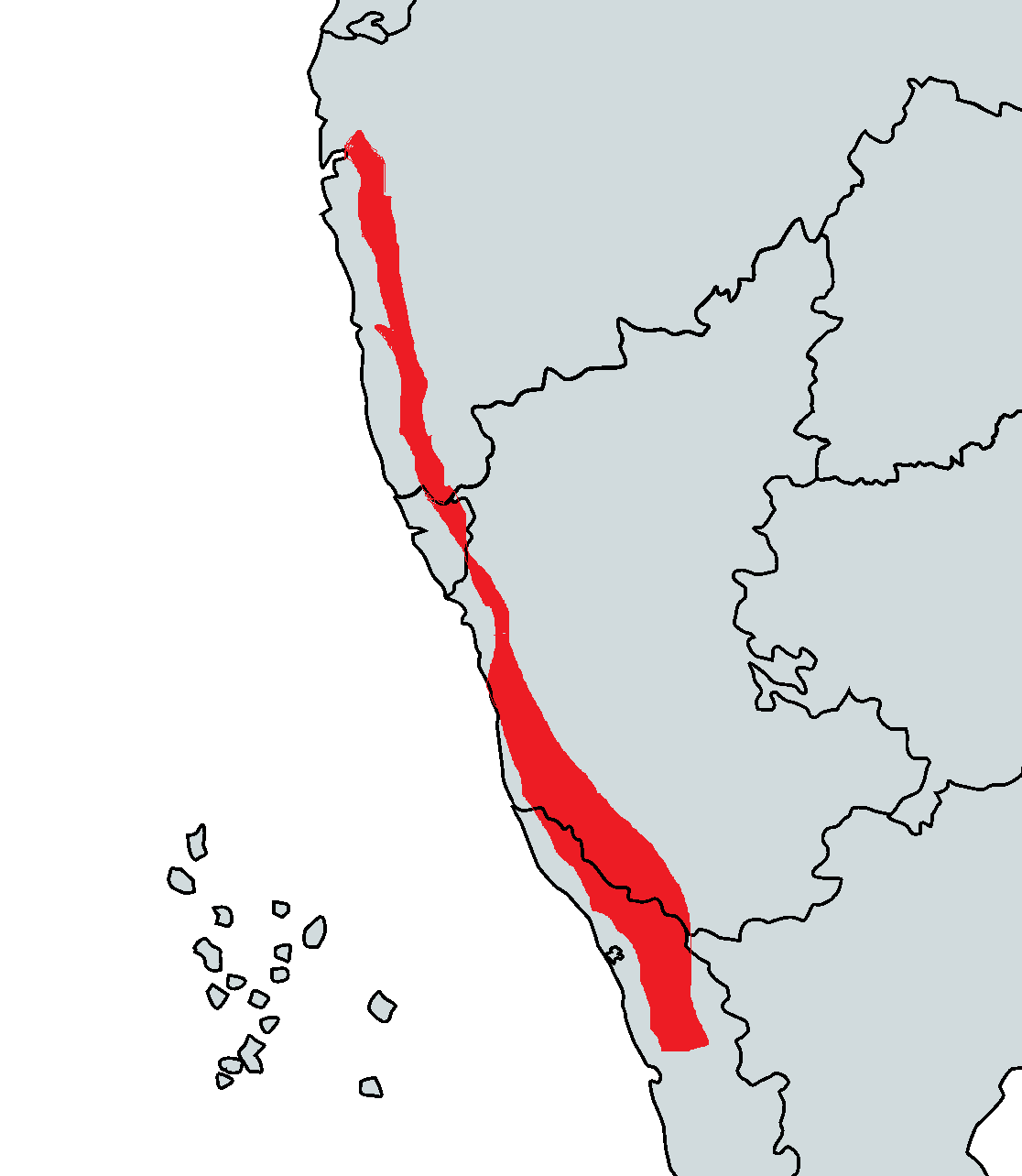

= Papilio buddha =

Malabar Banded Peacock

Species of butterfly

Papilio buddha, the Malabar banded peacock, is a species of swallowtail butterfly found in the Western Ghats of India. The Government of Kerala declared it as the official Kerala state butterfly. Papilio buddha is a threatened species and one of the species considered in a 2023 molecular phylogeny study of the Papilio genus, with the study concluding that it forms part of the Old World clade that existed around 30 million years ago in the Oligocene.

== Description ==
P. buddha resembles P. palinurus but is larger. The upperside of the wings also differ with the irroration of green scales more restricted, the outer half of the forewing except a triangular patch from the apex of wing downwards, and the outer third of the hindwing except a subterminal series of ill-formed lunules, devoid of green scales; discal transverse bands on both forewing and hindwings similar to those in P. palinurus but very much broader; the discal band of the forewing measured on the dorsum occupies considerably more than one-third of the dorsal length, while the discal band of the hindwing is as broad posteriorly as it is anteriorly (in P. palinurus it is much narrower posteriorly); the ochraceous tornal ocellus brighter, not surmounted with blue; the subapical ochraceous lunule in interspace 7 also brighter and much larger.

The underside is similar to the underside of P. palinurus, but on the hindwing the ochraceous lunules in the subterminal series is proportionately narrower and much more conspicuously bordered on their innersides with silvery white. Antennae, head, thorax and abdomen as in P. palinurus.

The wingspan is 107–155 mm.

== Life history ==
The caterpillar has a shield on the thoracic segments. Green, the shield laterally and posteriorly narrowly edged with white; segments 5 to 11 with a broad white line and above it a series of minute white spots on each segment.

The pupa is curved ventrally, head cleft, the processes long and upturned, back and sides keeled; colour dark green ventrally, pale green dorsally (after Davidson and Aitken).

Life cycle

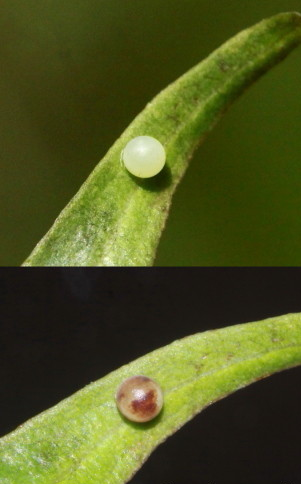
Egg

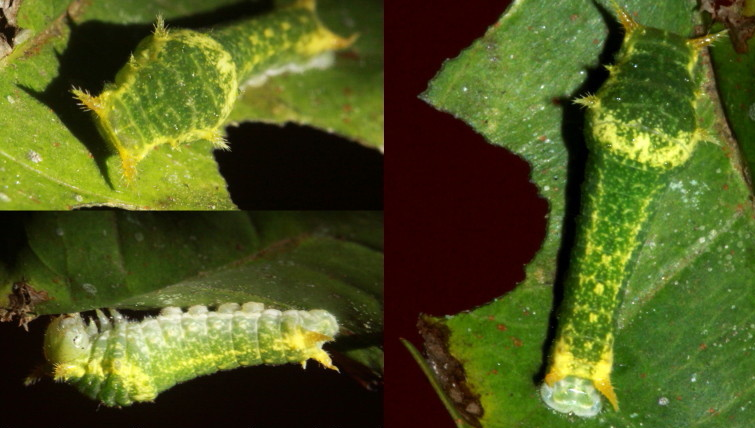
Larva

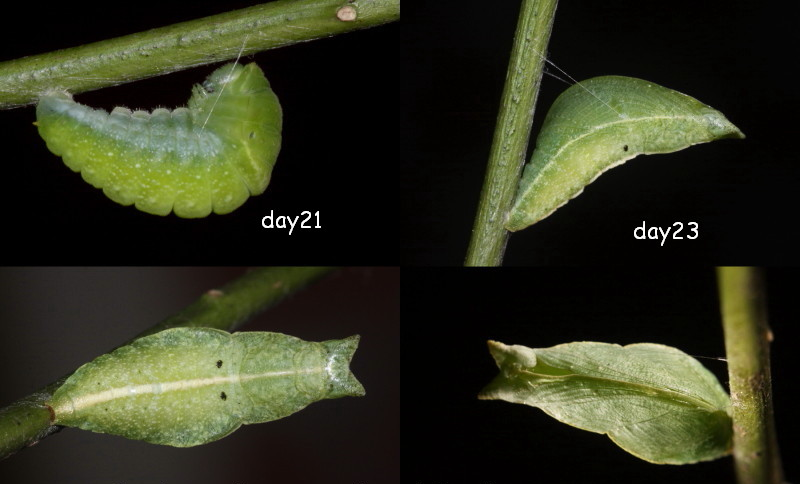
Chrysalis

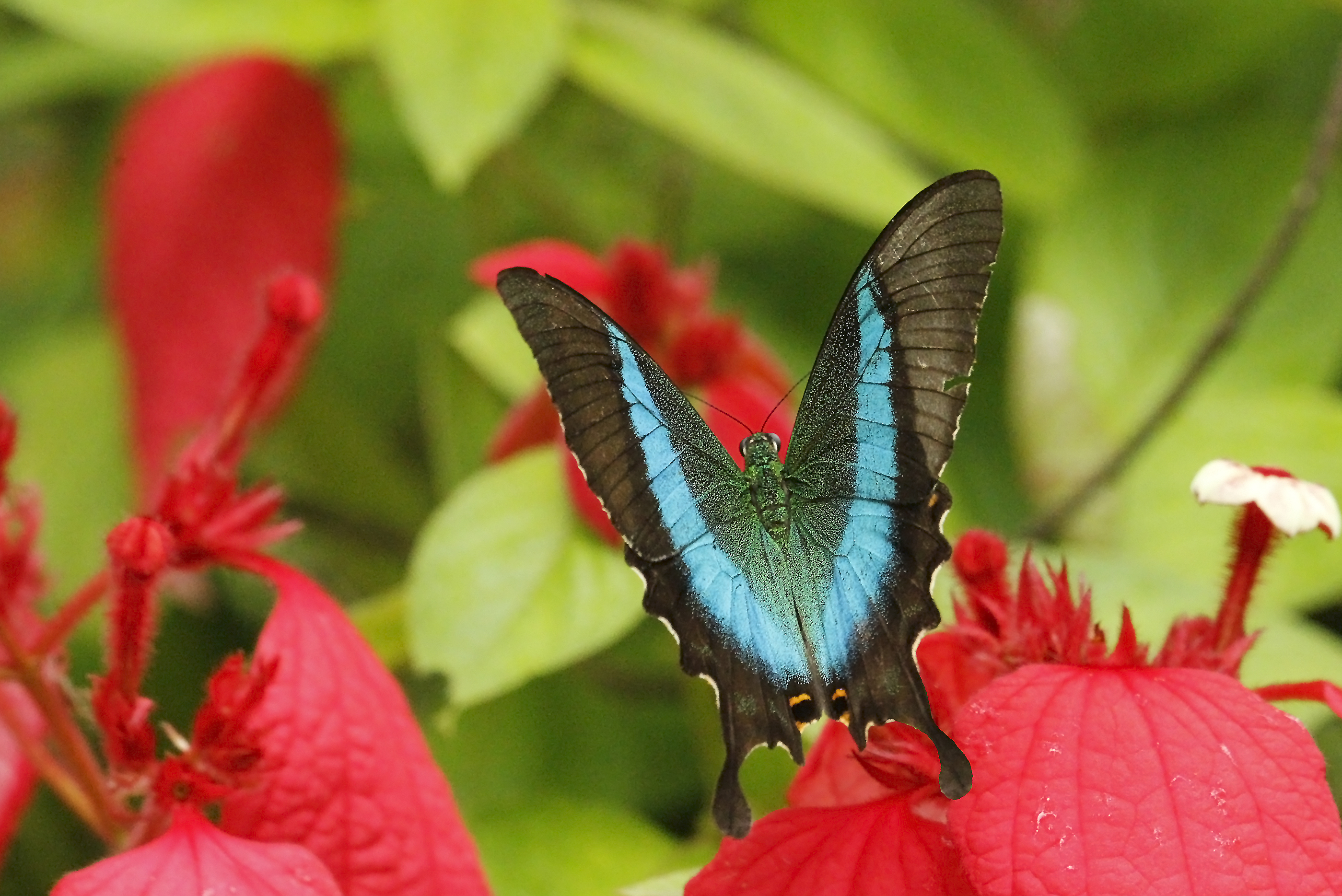
Imago (dorsal view)

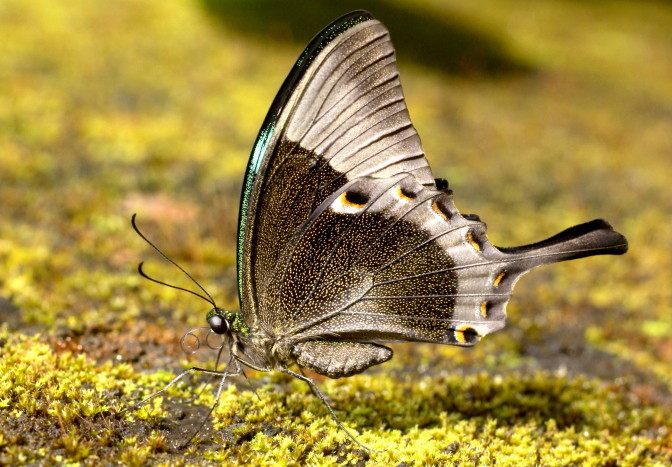
Imago (lateral view)

=== Host plants ===
The larva (caterpillar) has been recorded on Zanthoxylum rhetsa.

== Status ==
This species is locally common and not rare. It is protected in India but not known to be threatened.

== Taxonomy ==
It is a member of species group palinurus

== See also ==
- Papilionidae
- List of butterflies of India (Papilionidae)
