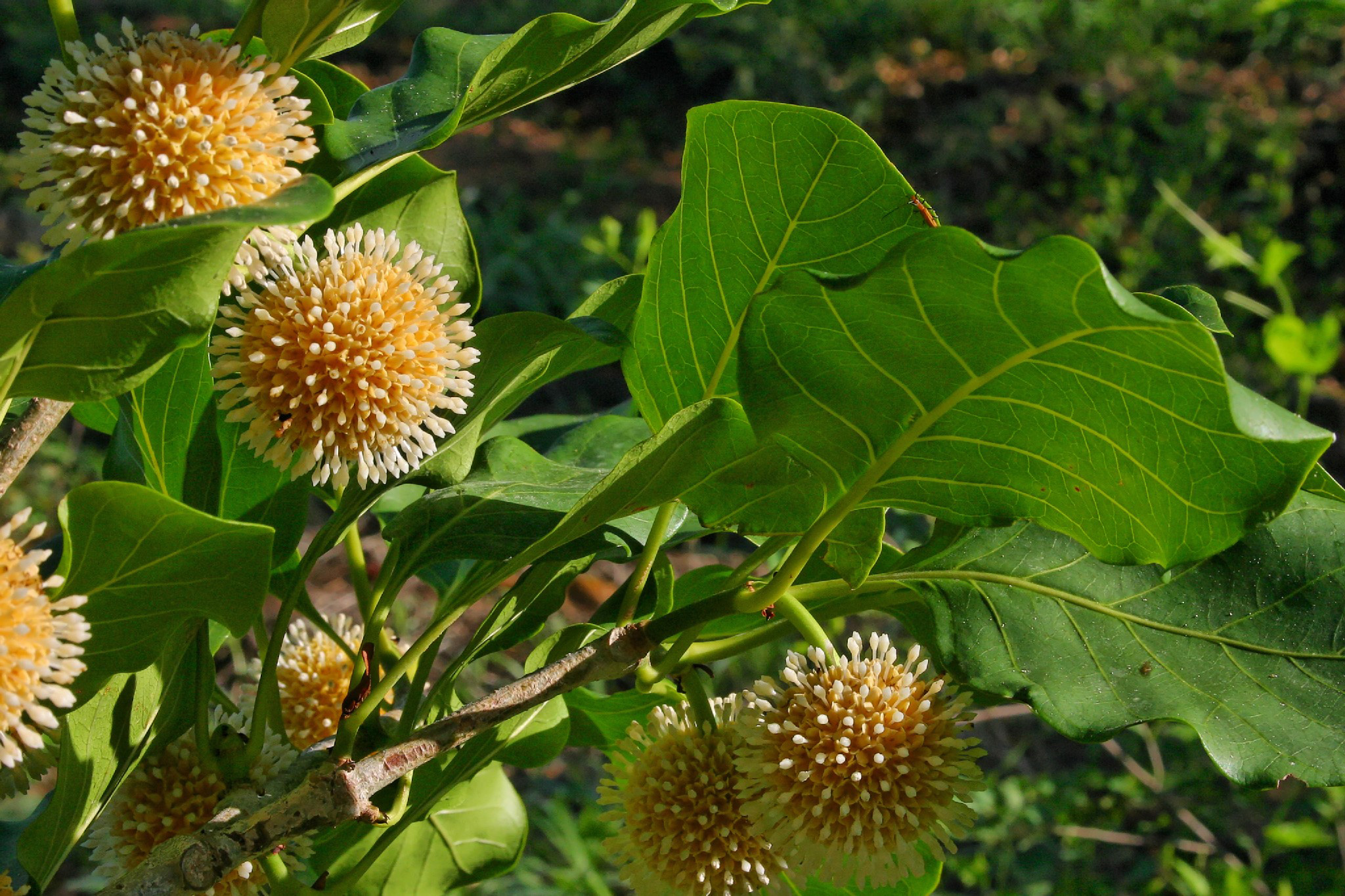
- Nauclea orientalis

Scientific classification
- Kingdom: Plantae
- Clade: Tracheophytes
- Clade: Angiosperms
- Clade: Eudicots
- Clade: Asterids
- Order: Gentianales
- Family: Rubiaceae
- Subfamily: Cinchonoideae
- Tribe: Naucleeae
- Genus: Nauclea; L.

Type species
- Nauclea orientalis (L.) L.

Synonyms
- Bancalus Rumph. ex Kuntze; Burttdavya Hoyle; Cephalina Thonn.; Platanocarpum Korth.; Platanocephalus Vaill. ex Crantz; Sarcocephalus Afzel. ex R.Br.

= Nauclea =

Genus of trees

Nauclea is a genus of flowering plants in the family Rubiaceae. The species are evergreen trees or shrubs that are native to the paleotropics. The terminal vegetative buds are usually strongly flattened. The generic name is derived from the Ancient Greek words naus, meaning "ship" and kleio, meaning "to close". It refers to the resemblance of the cells of the capsule to a ship's hull.

== Cultivation and use ==
Nauclea diderrichii is a large tree from West Africa that is widely cultivated elsewhere. Its wood is resistant to borers and is used around harbors and in other places where wood is in constant contact with water.

== Taxonomy ==
Nauclea is a member of the tribe Naucleeae. It is closely related to Burttdavya and Sarcocephalus, and these latter two genera are now considered synonyms of Nauclea. The current type species for the genus is Nauclea orientalis. Linnaeus originally named it Cephalanthus orientalis in the first edition of Species Plantarum but transferred it to Nauclea when he erected that genus in the second edition in 1762.

== Species ==
- Nauclea diderrichii (De Wild.) Merr.
- Nauclea gilletii (De Wild.) Merr.
- Nauclea latifolia Smith - Common names: African peach, Guinea peach, Sierra Leone peach, country fig
- Nauclea nyasica (Hoyle) Å.Krüger & Löfstrand
- Nauclea officinalis (Pierre ex Pit.) Merr. & Chun
- Nauclea orientalis (L.) L. - Common names: Kanluang, Bangkal, Leichhardt Tree, Cheesewood, Yellow Cheesewood, Canary Cheesewood
- Nauclea parva (Havil.) Merr.
- Nauclea pobeguinii (Hua ex Pobég.) Merr.
- Nauclea robinsonii Merr.
- Nauclea subdita (Korth.) Steud. - Common names: Bongkol, Bulubangkal
- Nauclea tenuiflora (Havil.) Merr.
- Nauclea vanderguchtii (De Wild.) E.M.A.Petit
