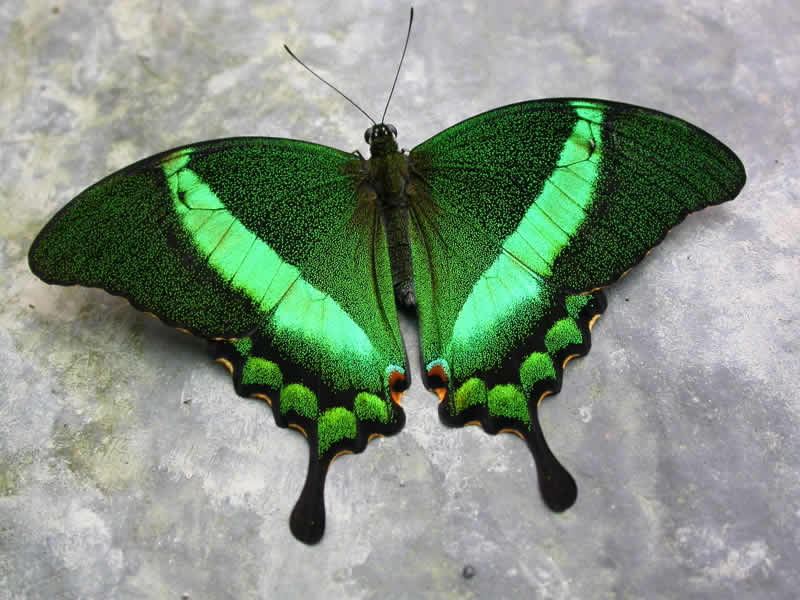

Scientific classification
- Kingdom: Animalia
- Phylum: Arthropoda
- Clade: Pancrustacea
- Class: Insecta
- Order: Lepidoptera
- Family: Papilionidae
- Genus: Papilio
- Species: P. palinurus

Binomial name
- Papilio palinurus Fabricius, 1787

= Papilio palinurus =

Species of butterfly

Papilio palinurus, the emerald swallowtail, emerald peacock, or green-banded peacock, is a butterfly of the genus Papilio of the family Papilionidae. It is native to Southeast Asia, but is regularly kept in butterfly houses around the world.

== Description ==
Papilio palinurus has a wingspan reaching about 8–10 cm (3.1–3.9 in). The dorsal sides of the wings are covered by a powder of green scales, and the background varies from dark greenish to black, with broad, bright emerald green, metallic bands. The undersides are black with orange, white, and blue spots along the edges of hindwings that show extended tails at the end. Compared to P. buddha, the band of both wings is narrower, the distal-marginal area of the forewing is dusted with green, the hindwing has large, green, submarginal spots; the grey band of the forewing beneath is placed very close to the cell and is basally concave. The earlier stages are not known. The butterfly flies in wooded country and is very shy and agile; it occasionally enters gardens and is fond of feeding at the flowers of Ixora, Lantana, etc. It is also often found at damp places on forest paths. It has a habit of flying close over the water like a swallow, dipping its body in and then hurrying away. The band of the forewing is very obliquely placed, being posteriorly at most 5 mm from the end of the submedian; both the band of the hindwing and it vary in width in all localities. In most of the specimens from North Borneo, the band is slightly blue. The undersurface varies especially in the size of the submarginal spots of the hindwing.

== Biology ==
Copulating adults. The larger one above is the female.

The flight of these butterflies is swift and quite fast. Caterpillars feed on plants of genus Euodia belonging to the Rutaceae, commonly known as the rue or citrus family.

== Subspecies ==
The several subspecies (from Burma, Borneo, Indonesia, Nias, and the Philippines) include:

- P. p. palinurus – Burma, Malaysia, Borneo
- P. p. auffenbergi Späth, 1992 – Simeulue, Indonesia
- P. p. nymphodorus (Fruhstorfer) – Island of Basilan
- P. p. adventus (Fruhstorfer) – Island of Nias
- P. p. daedalus (C. & R. Felder, 1861) – the Philippines
- P. p. angustatus (Staudinger, 1888) – Island of Palawan, Philippines

== Etymology ==
The genus name Papilio comes from the Latin word papilio meaning butterfly. The specific name palinurus derives from Palinurus, the name of the pilot of Aeneas's boat in Virgil's Aeneid.

== Distribution ==
This species can be found primarily in Southeast Asia, particularly in Burma – Peninsular Malaysia, Sumatra, Borneo, Indonesia (Simeulue, Island of Nias), Philippines (Basilan, Palawan, Balabac, Cuyo, Busuanga, and Dumaran).

== Habitat ==
Papilio palinurus lives in Asian primary forests.

== Taxonomy ==
It is a member of species group plalinurus, which includes:

- Papilio blumei Boisduval, 1836 – peacock or green swallowtail
- Papilio buddha Westwood, 1872 – Malabar banded peacock
- Papilio crino Fabricius, 1793 – common banded peacock
- Papilio palinurus Fabricius, 1787 – emerald swallowtail

== Green by structural coloration ==
The green of Papilio palinurus is created by structural coloration, using special microstructures in the wing scales.

The iridescent green sheen of the bands of this butterfly is not produced by pigments, but is structural coloration produced by the microstructure of the wing scales. They refract the light and give rise to blue and yellow visible reflections, producing the perception of green color when additively mixed.

== Gallery ==
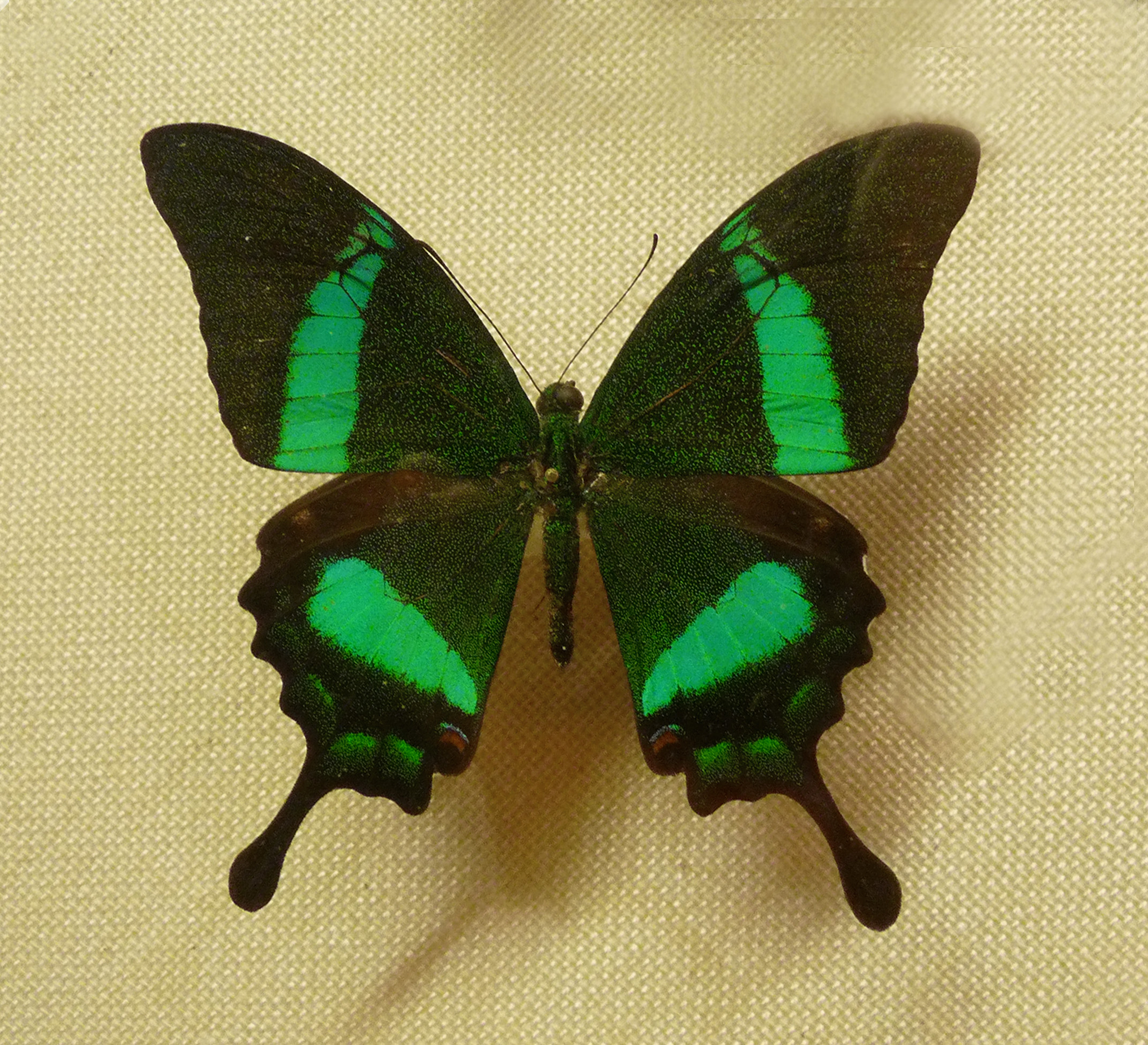
Specimen from the Musée zoologique de la ville de Strasbourg

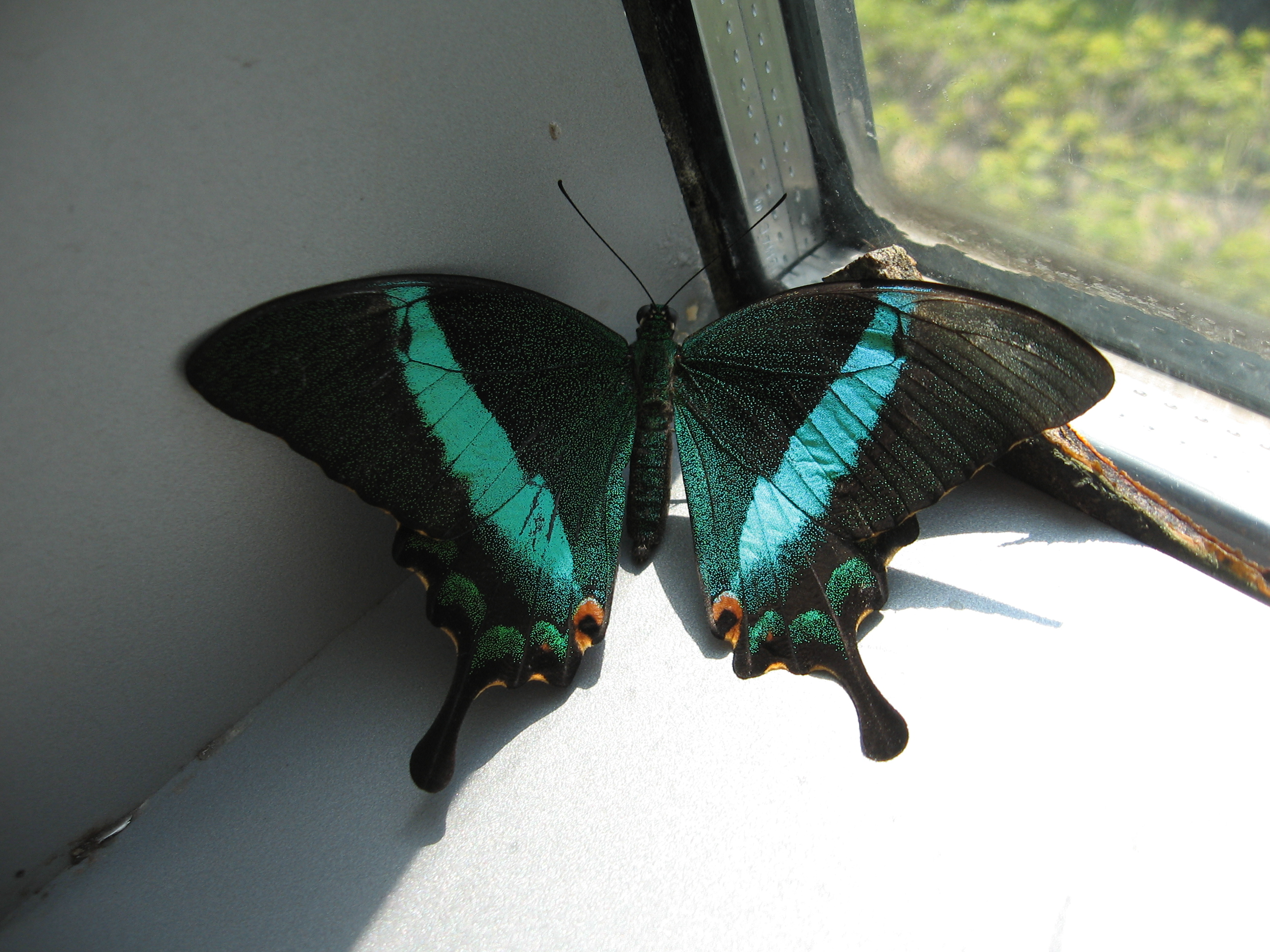
Can appear blue with certain lighting

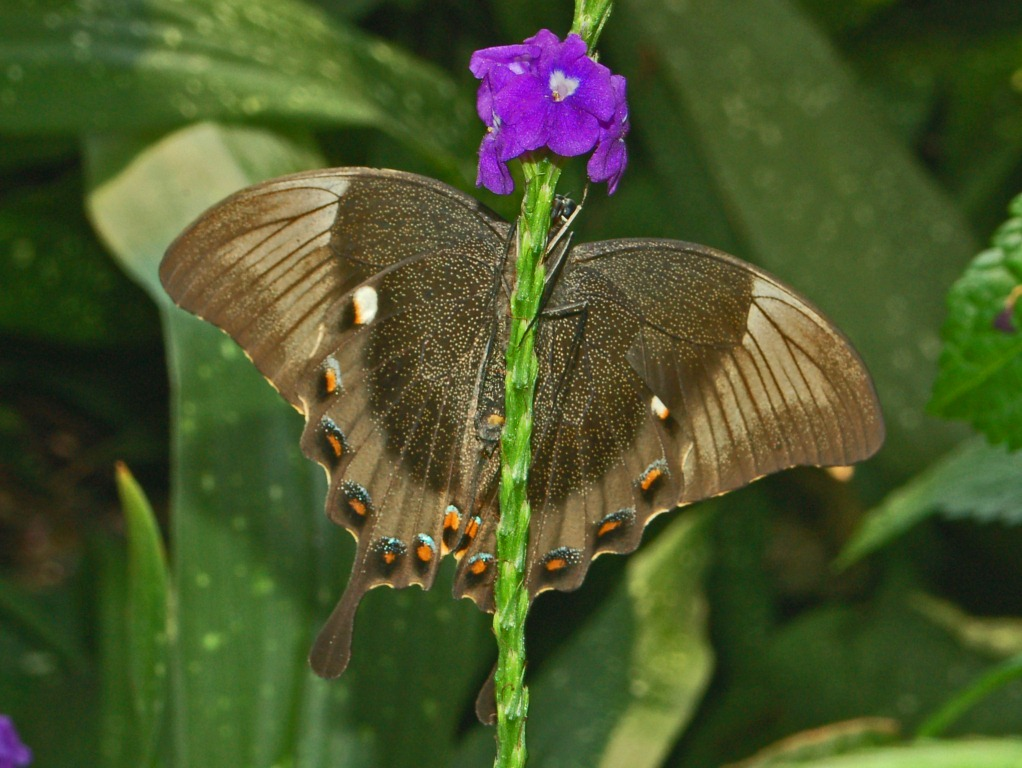
Ventral view

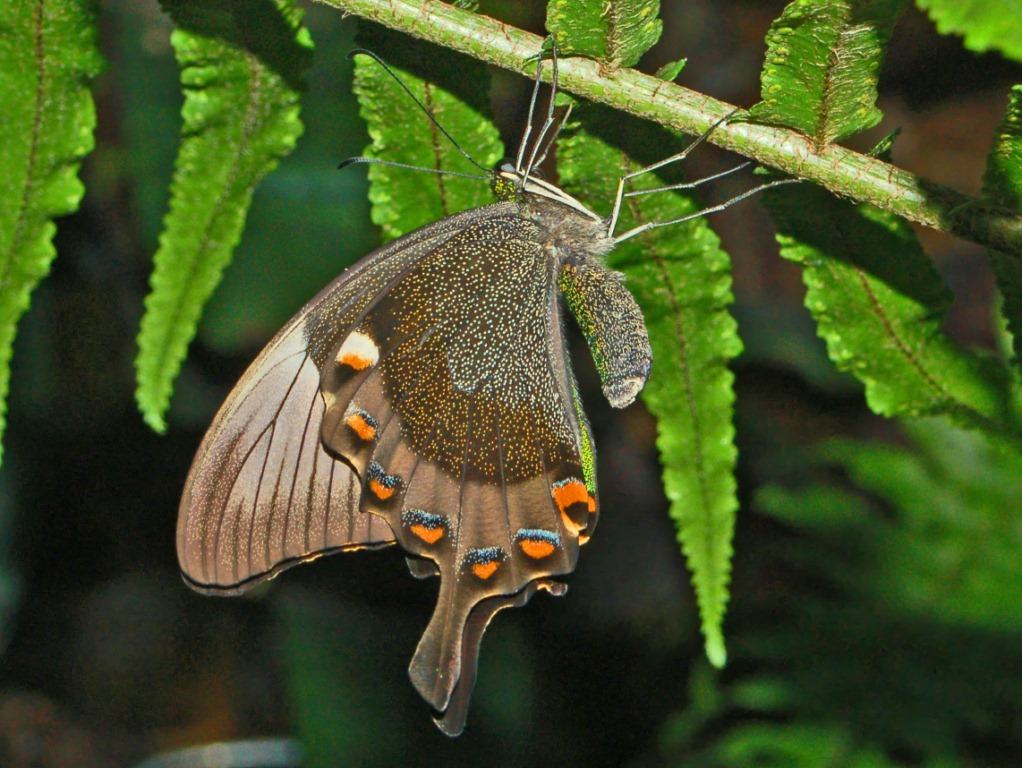
Underwing
