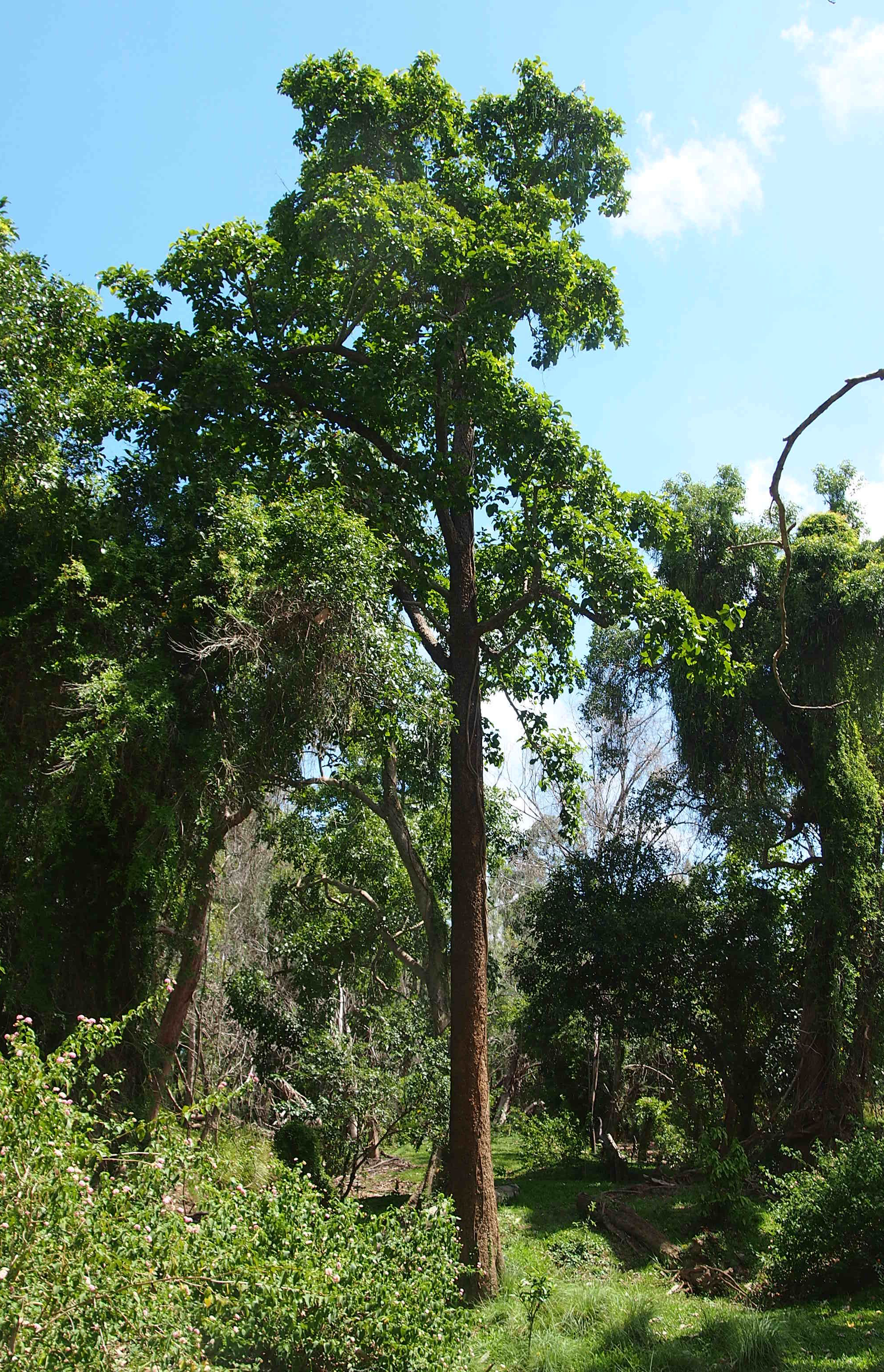
- Leichhardt tree from Rockhampton, Queensland
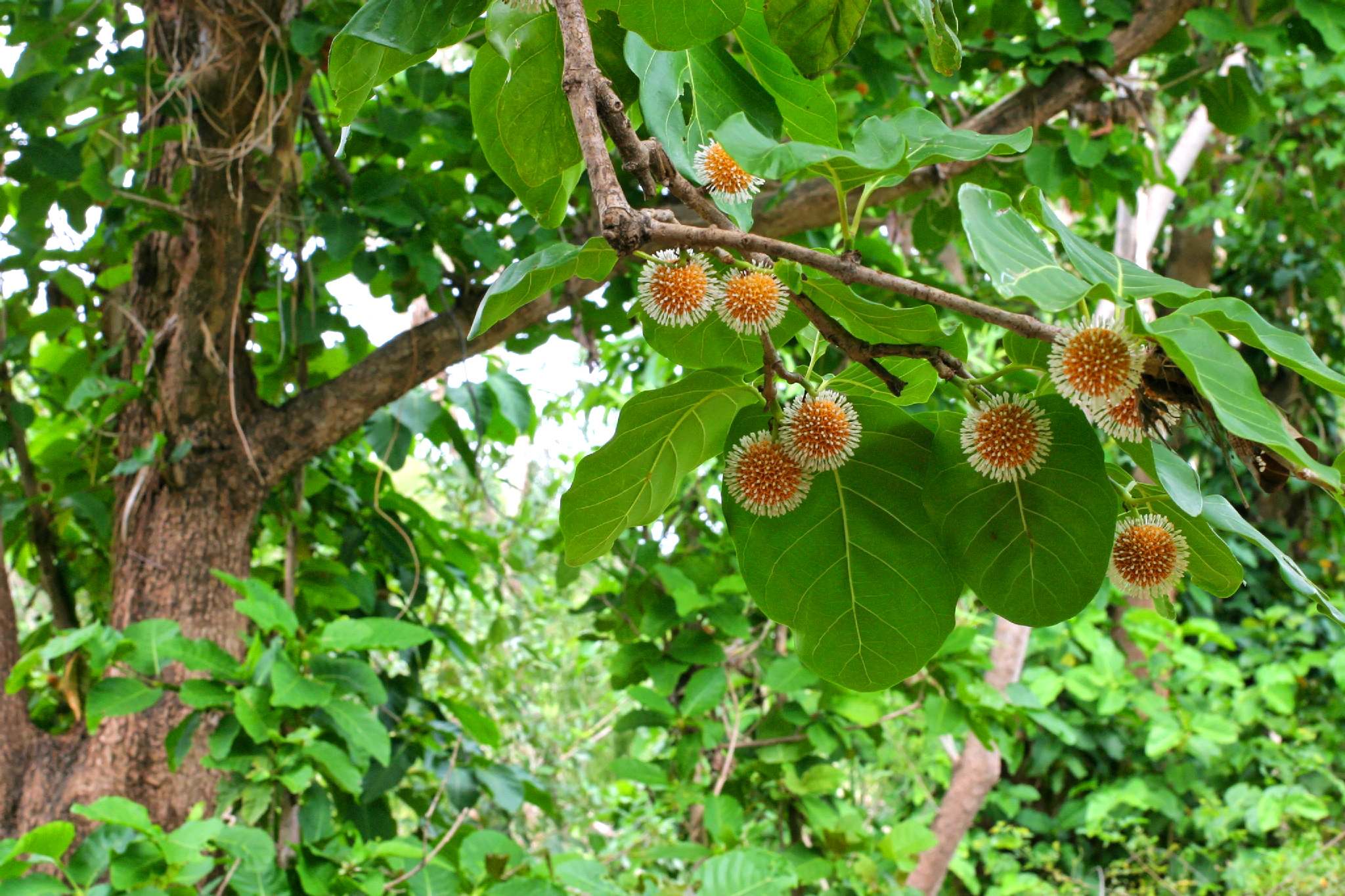
- Leichhardt tree from Gregory National Park, Northern Territory

Scientific classification
- Kingdom: Plantae
- Clade: Tracheophytes
- Clade: Angiosperms
- Clade: Eudicots
- Clade: Asterids
- Order: Gentianales
- Family: Rubiaceae
- Genus: Nauclea
- Species: N. orientalis

Binomial name
- Nauclea orientalis (L.) L.
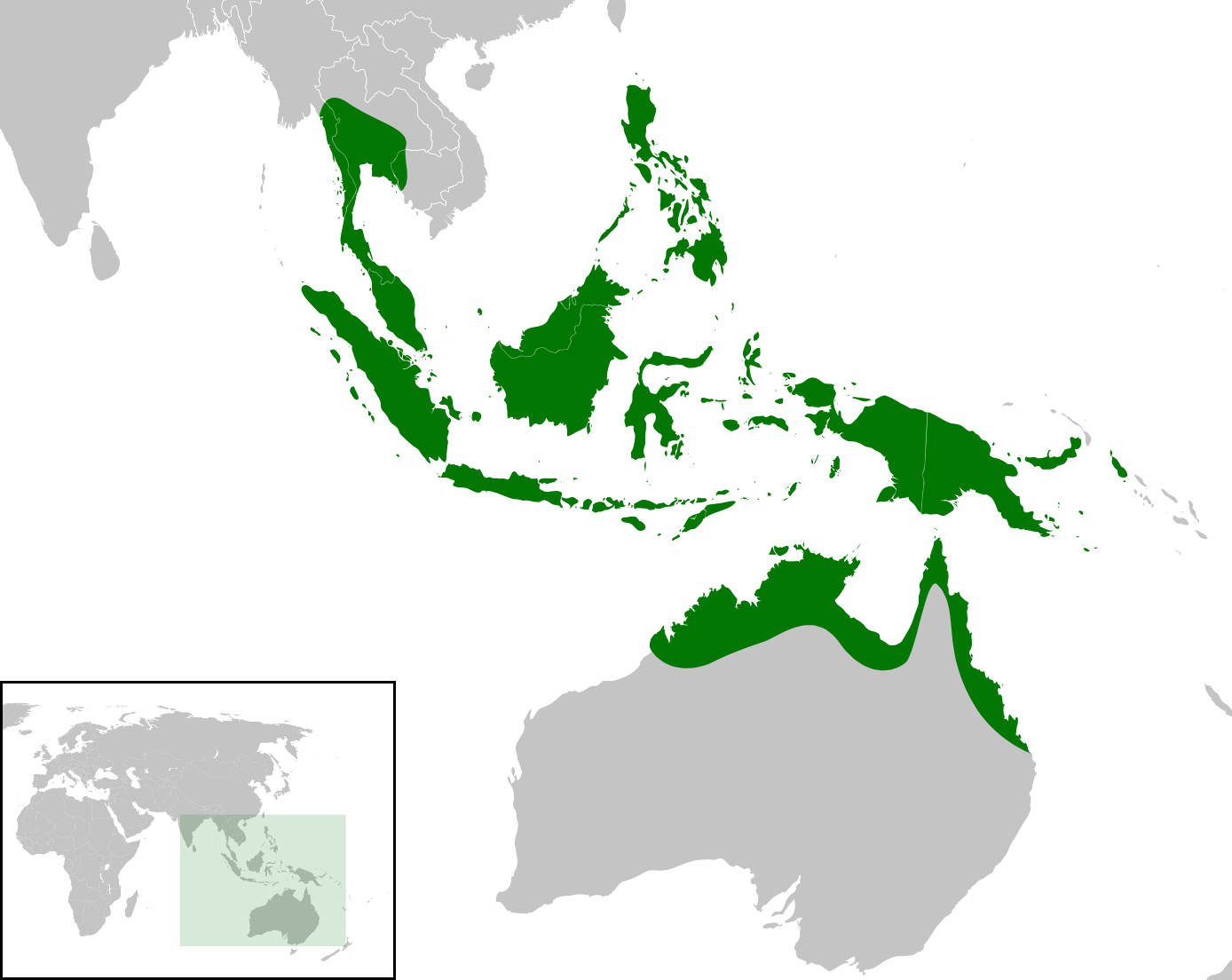
- N. orientalis distribution map.

Synonyms
- List: Adina orientalis (L.) Lindeman Ex Bakh. F.; Bancalus cordatus (Roxb.) Kuntze; Bancalus grandifolius Kuntze; Bancalus macrophyllus Kuntze; Bancalus orientalis (L.) Kuntze; Cephalanthus orientalis L.; Cephalanthus chinensis Lam.; Nauclea annamensis (Dubard & Eberh.) Merr.; Nauclea coadunata Roxb. ex Sm.; Nauclea cordata Roxb.; Nauclea elmeri Merr.; Nauclea glaberrima Bartl. ex Dc.; Nauclea grandifolia Dc.; Nauclea leichhardtii F. Muell.; Nauclea lutea Blanco; Nauclea macrophylla Blume; Nauclea orientalis var. pubescens (Kurz) Craib; Nauclea ovoidea (Pierre Ex Pit.) N. N. Tran; Nauclea roxburghii G. Don; Nauclea stipulacea G. Don; Nauclea undulata Roxb.; Nauclea wallichiana R. Br. Ex G. Don; Platanocarpum cordatum Korth.; Sarcocephalus annamensis Dubard & Eberh.; Sarcocephalus bartlirgii Miq.; Sarcocephalus buruensis Miq.; Sarcocephalus coadunatus (Roxb. ex Sm.) Druce; Sarcocephalus cordatus (Roxb.) Miq.; Sarcocephalus cordatus var. glabra Kurz; Sarcocephalus cordatus var. pubescens Kurz; Sarcocephalus glaberrimus (Bartl. Ex Dc.) Miq.; Sarcocephalus orientalis (L.) Merr.; Sarcocephalus ovatus Elmer; Sarcocephalus ovatus var. mollis Koord. & Valeton; Sarcocephalus ovoideus Pierre Ex Pit.; Sarcocephalus papagola Domin; Sarcocephalus undulatus (Roxb.) Miq.; Sarcocephalus undulatus var. buruensis (Miq.) Havil.

= Nauclea orientalis =

Species of tree

Nauclea orientalis is a species of tree in the family Rubiaceae, native to Southeast Asia, New Guinea, and Australia. It has many common names, including bur tree, canary wood, Leichhardt pine, yellow cheesewood and bangkal. It grows to a maximum of around 30 m (98 ft) in height and has large glossy leaves. It bears spherical clusters of fragrant flowers that develop into golf-ball-sized edible but bitter fruits. The yellowish-to-orange soft wood is also used for timber and in woodcarving and folk medicine.

== Taxonomy and nomenclature ==
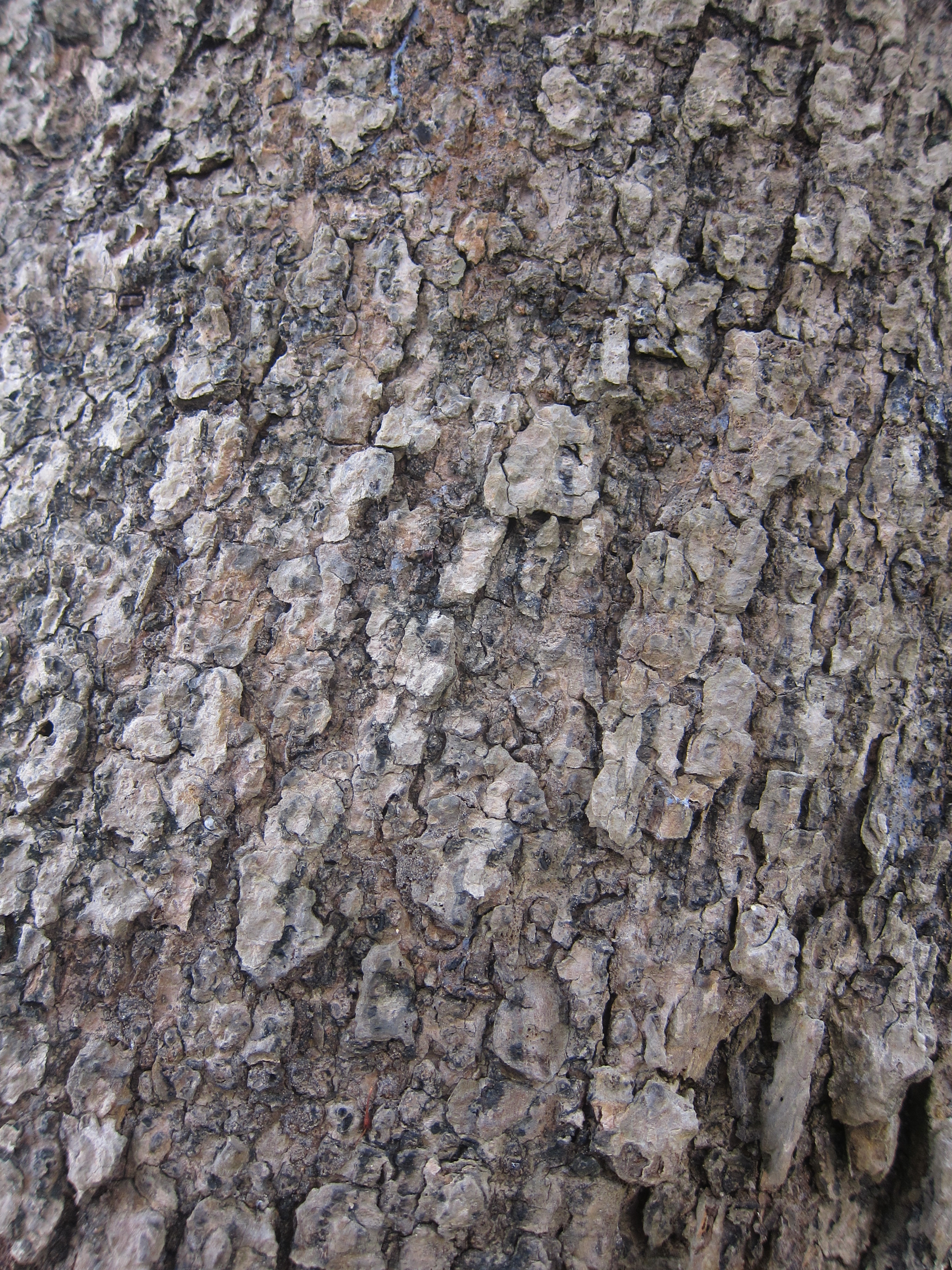
Mature bark

Nauclea orientalis is known by the common names Leichhardt tree, cheesewood, yellow cheesewood, canary cheesewood, and bangkal. It is also sometimes known as the Leichhardt pine due to the overall shape of the tree, though it is not a conifer. "Leichhardt pine", however, is more commonly used for the kadam or burrflower tree (Neolamarckia cadamba), a closely related species. The two were often confused together, but the native range of Leichhardt trees does not extend to India where kadam trees are common. It is known chiefly as bangkal in the Philippines. Regional variations of the name include balikakak, kabag, kabak, mabalot, and malbog. It is closely related to, and sometimes confused with, the bongkol or bulubangkal tree (Nauclea subdita). It is called kanluang in Thailand.

Among the Djabugay people of Australia, they are known as gadugay. Among the Kuku Yalanji, they are known as kabal. The Jawoyn people call it jirrib or wowerlk. In various other languages of the Indigenous Australians, the names for Leichhardt trees include kaapi or kalpi in Pakanh, atulwanyj in Uw Oykangand, atulganyj in Uw Olkola. In avoidance speech (Uw Ilbmbanhdhiy or "respect language"), it is known as oboy in Uw Oykangand and opoy in Uw Olkola.

The common name "Leichhardt tree" is from the German explorer Ludwig Leichhardt, who encountered the tree in his first expedition from Moreton Bay to Port Essington (from October 1, 1844 to December 17, 1845). He mistakenly identified it as a closely related Sarcocephalus and remarked on their preponderance near large riverbanks.

Leichhardt trees belong to the genus Nauclea classified under the tribe Naucleeae, subfamily Cinchonoideae of the coffee family (Rubiaceae).

The species was first described as Cephalanthus orientalis by Carl Linnaeus in the first edition of Species Plantarum, but was transferred to the genus Nauclea in the second edition in 1762. The specific epithet orientalis means "eastern". The generic name Nauclea comes from Greek naus ("ship") and kleio ("close"). It is unknown why, as no part of the plant is remotely boat-like. A likely explanation is that Linnaeus was using different parts of plants when he first described the species and may have erroneously attributed a boat-like part of another plant to the species. It might also be a reference to the shape of the fruit cells. Many authors agree on the view that Linnaeus's description of C. orientalis in 1753 is a mixture of true Nauclea orientalis and a description by Hendrik van Rheede, and the true identity of Rheede's plant (as Katou Tsjaca or Katou Tsjaka) had been variously argued since at least 1798. Colin Ernest Ridsdale discussed this matter and supposed that Rheede had intended to describe kadam. The illustration of the Rheede's plant was later designated as the lectotype of kadam, i.e. Neolamarckia cadamba when Jean Bosser tried to solve the taxonomic problem of that species.

== Description ==
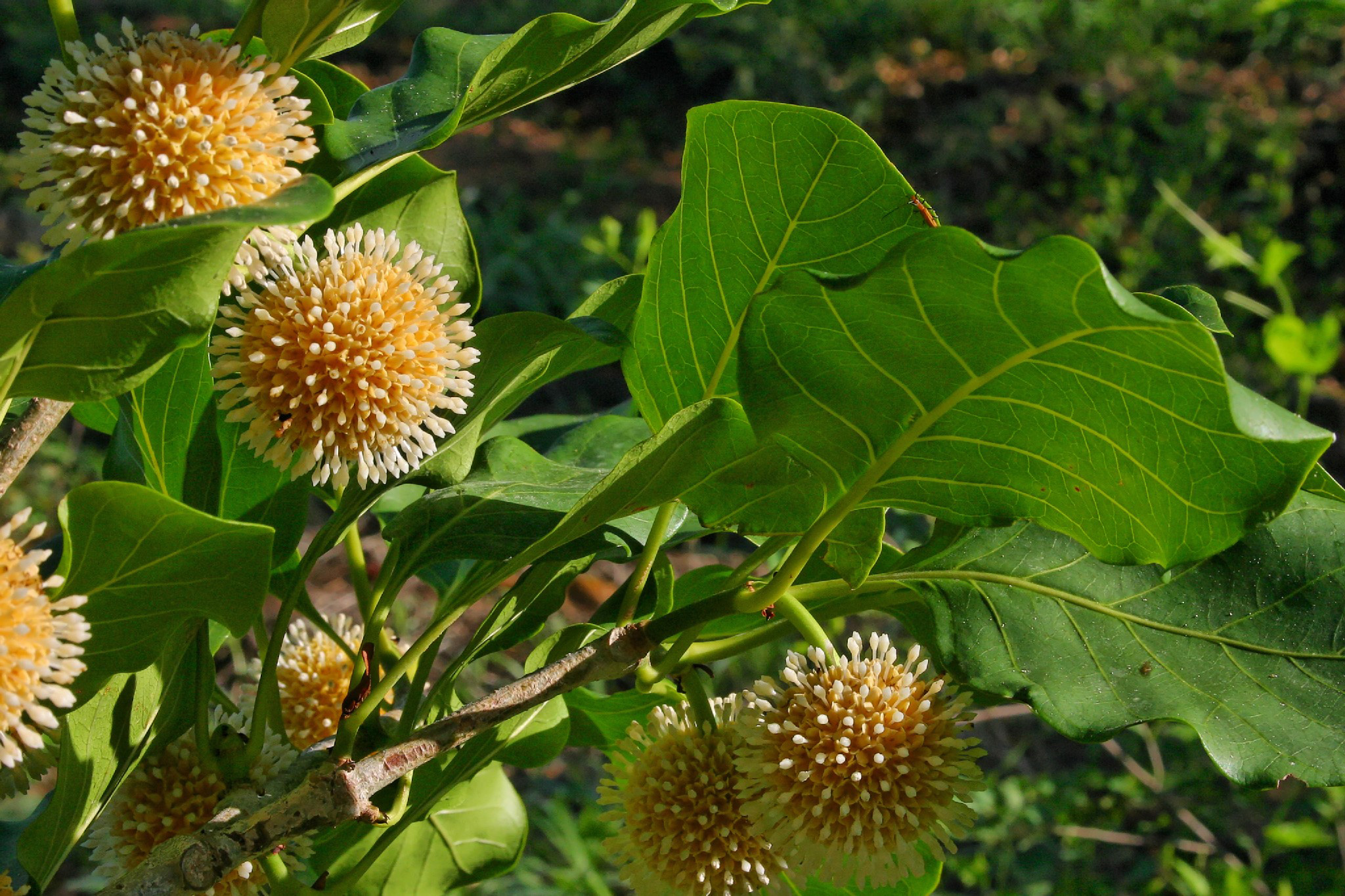
The spherical inflorescence of Leichhardt trees.

Leichhardt trees are medium to tall trees, reaching maximum height of around 30 m (98 ft) with a diameter of 1 m (3.3 ft). They are deciduous, shedding their leaves during the dry season. The bark surface of Liechhardt trees are grayish-to-reddish-brown and may be smooth or fissured and flaky. It is orange-to-yellow in color when cut.

The broadly ovate smooth (glabrous) leaves are opposite and around 7 to 30 cm (2.8 to 11.8 in) by 4 to 18 cm (1.6 to 7.1 in) in size. The upper surface is glossy green. The bottom side has raised prominent yellow venation. Like most members of the family Rubiaceae, the stipules of Leichhardt trees are interpetiolar. In Nauclea, these interpetiolar stipules are held erect and pressed together, resulting in strongly flattened vegetative buds. They are large, around 1 to 3.5 cm (0.39 to 1.38 in) long. On their inside surfaces are a number of small red glands that can resemble insect eggs.

The small fragrant flowers are tubular and are yellowish-to-orange with white stamens. They are grouped into a spherical cluster originating from a central point about 3 cm (1.2 in) in diameter. In Australia they bloom from September to January, and in the Philippines from August to October. The individual flowers are small, about 8 to 10 mm (0.31 to 0.39 in) long and 3 to 5 mm (0.12 to 0.20 in) in diameter. They possess a perianth (each composed of five petals and sepals in separate whorls), The internal surface of the corolla are yellow-to-orange and sweet-smelling. They are frequently partly fused together, forming a long corolla tube tipped with the individual lobes of the petals. The flowers are bisexual, with five short and separate stamens attached to the perianth. The calyces are also fused together, resulting in the spherical shape of the flower head. They are epigynous, with the ovary inferior (lying below the attachment of the other flower parts).

After three months, the flower heads develop into a fleshy globular multiple fruit (syncarp) joined by their calyces (each flower becoming a fruitlet containing one seed). They are around 4 to 5 cm (1.6 to 2.0 in) in diameter, about the size of a golf ball. The fruit is rugose (wrinkled), brown, and strongly aromatic. The fruits are indehiscent.

The ovoid to ellipsoid seeds are small, around 1 to 10 mm (0.039 to 0.394 in) in length and are not winged. They are very numerous but do not remain viable for long. Being recalcitrant (unable to survive drying and freezing temperatures), it's impossible to store them. The seeds germinate above ground (epigeal germination) around 15 days after being sown.

== Distribution and habitat ==
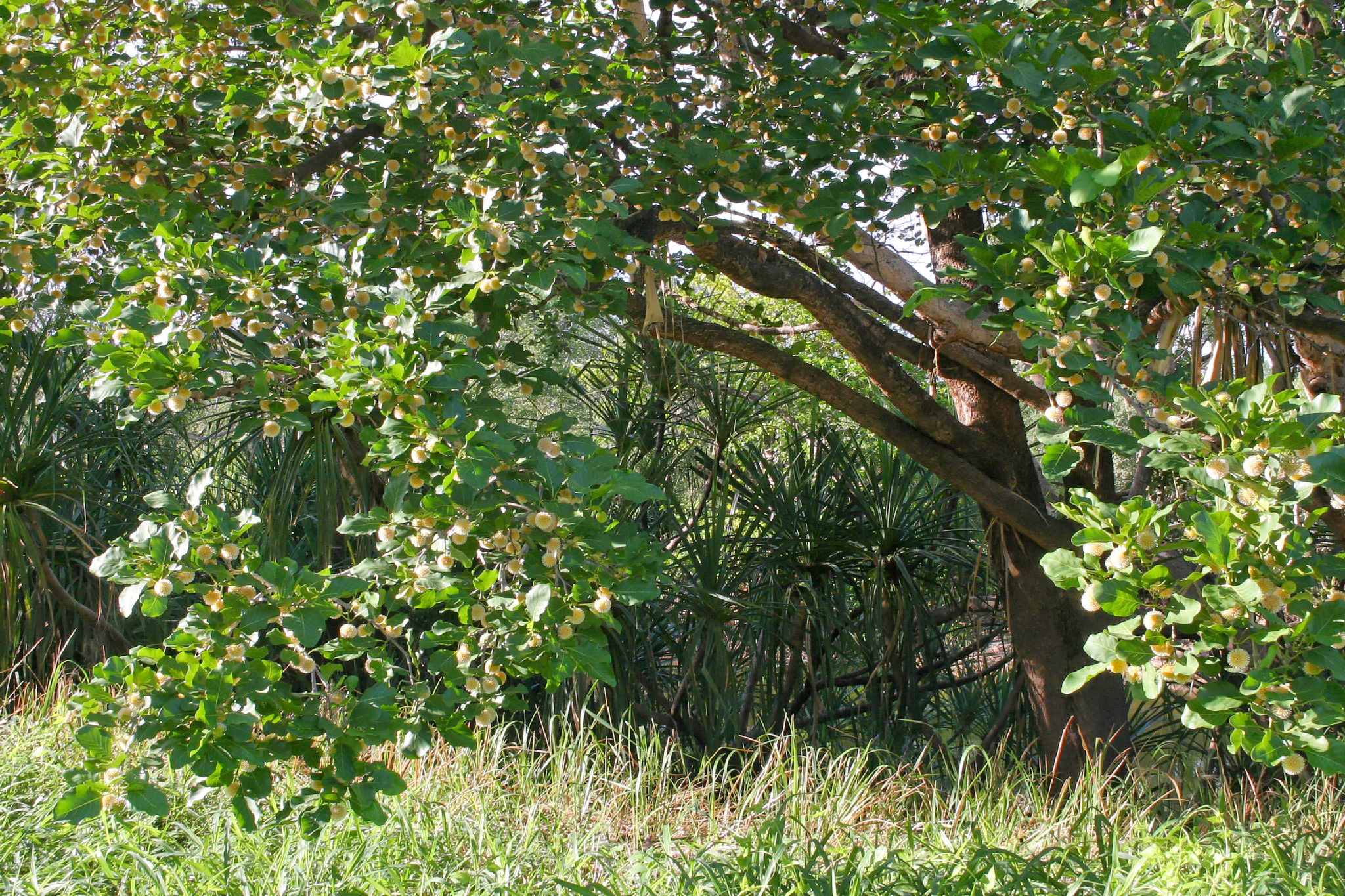
Leichhardt tree from Gregory National Park, Northern Territory, Australia

Leichhardt trees usually grow near bodies of water, as they prefer alluvial soils. They can occur from shrublands of rheophytes, in areas often subjected to flooding, to rainforests where they flourish best. Leichhardt trees are pioneer species, settling areas leading to ecological succession. In Australia, they are usually associated in ecosystems including red gums and honey myrtles in drier habitats. In wetter areas they are associated with brush cherries, Moreton Bay chestnuts, and blush walnuts. They grow along with honey myrtles in swamps. In the Philippines, Leichhardt trees are usually found growing in secondary forests.

Leichhardt trees grow at elevations of 0 to 500 m (0 to 1,640 ft) above sea level. Their native range extends from tropical Northern Australia and New Guinea to Southeast Asia; from the Philippines to Myanmar and Thailand (the biogeographic region of Malesia). They are the only species of Nauclea occurring in Australia, though in some regions they can be easily confused with species from the genus Neolamarckia (= Anthocephalus auct. non A.Rich.).

== Uses ==
The tree is cultivated for ornamental purposes. The fruits of the tree are edible and are eaten by Indigenous Australians, though it is very bitter-tasting. They are also eaten by flying foxes and birds (like Cassowaries).

In Malaysia, it is one of the food sources of proboscis monkeys (Nasalis larvatus), along with other members of Rubiaceae.

The wood is easily cut (hence the common name of "cheesewood") but is not durable to weather exposure. It is distinctively yellowish-to-orange in color. The timber is used for frames and internal floorboards. It is also used in woodcarving, paper production, house construction, and for making canoes.

The bark is also used to make fish poison. The extract is added to slow-moving bodies of water to stun fish and make them easier to catch.

In folk medicine, bark infusions cause vomiting and are used by Indigenous Australians to treat stomachaches and animal bites. It is the source of a yellow dye. In the Philippines, it is used to treat wounds.

Studies on indole alkaloids extracted from Leichhardt trees have also pointed to possible antimalarial and anticancer effects.

== Pests and diseases ==
Leichhardt trees are susceptible to Lyctus beetles and blue stain fungus (Grosmannia clavigera). It is also reportedly vulnerable to termites.

== See also ==
- Fish toxins
- Nauclea diderrichii
- Neolamarckia cadamba, the kadam tree. A species commonly confused with the Leichhardt tree.
