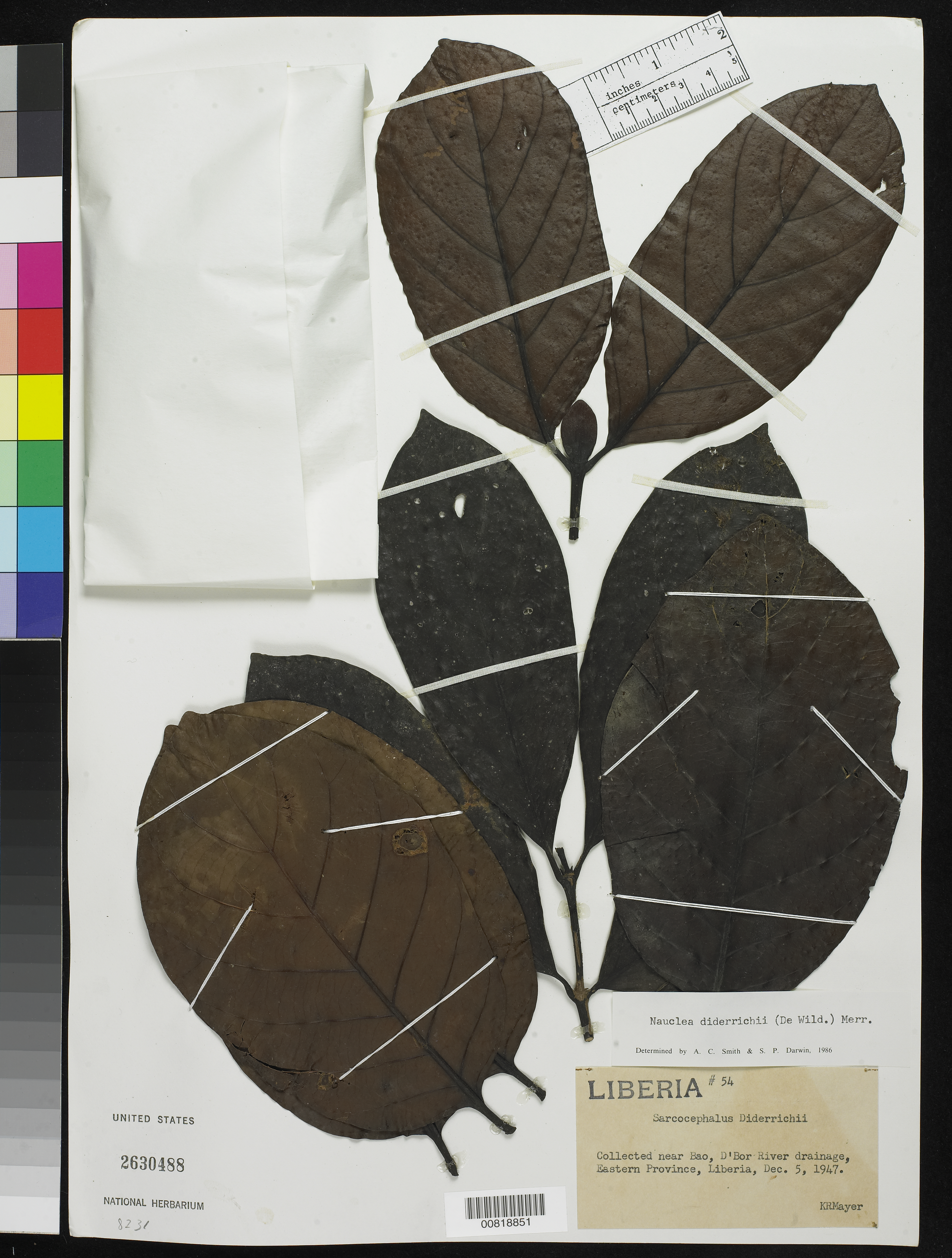
- Specimen of Nauclea diderrichii collected in Liberia

Conservation status
- Near Threatened (IUCN 3.1)

Scientific classification
- Kingdom: Plantae
- Clade: Embryophytes
- Clade: Tracheophytes
- Clade: Angiosperms
- Clade: Eudicots
- Clade: Asterids
- Order: Gentianales
- Family: Rubiaceae
- Genus: Nauclea
- Species: N. diderrichii

Binomial name
- Nauclea diderrichii (De Wild.) Merr.

Synonyms
- Sarcocephalus diderrichii De Wild. Nauclea trillesii Merr. Sarcocephalus badi Aubrév. Sarcocephalus trillesii Pierre ex A.Chev.

= Nauclea diderrichii =

Species of plant

Nauclea diderrichii is a species of tree of the genus Nauclea in the family Rubiaceae. It is known by the common names bilinga, aloma, badi, kusia and opepe.

== Description ==
Nauclea diderrichii is found in Angola, Cameroon, the Central African Republic, the Republic of the Congo, the Democratic Republic of the Congo, the Ivory Coast, Gabon, Ghana, Liberia, Mozambique, Nigeria, Sierra Leone, and Uganda. Its natural habitat is subtropical or tropical moist lowland forests. It grows to around 35m to 48m tall, and 1m to 2m in diameter at breast height. It is threatened by overexploitation for timber and habitat loss.

== Uses ==
The timber is known as bilinga, or Aloma in Germany and opepe in the UK. It is hard, dense and resistant to fungi and insects, and is used in joinery, flooring and marine construction.

== Alkaloids ==
Methyl 5-vinylnicotinate [38940-67-9] is one of the alkaloids present in Nauclea diderrichii.
