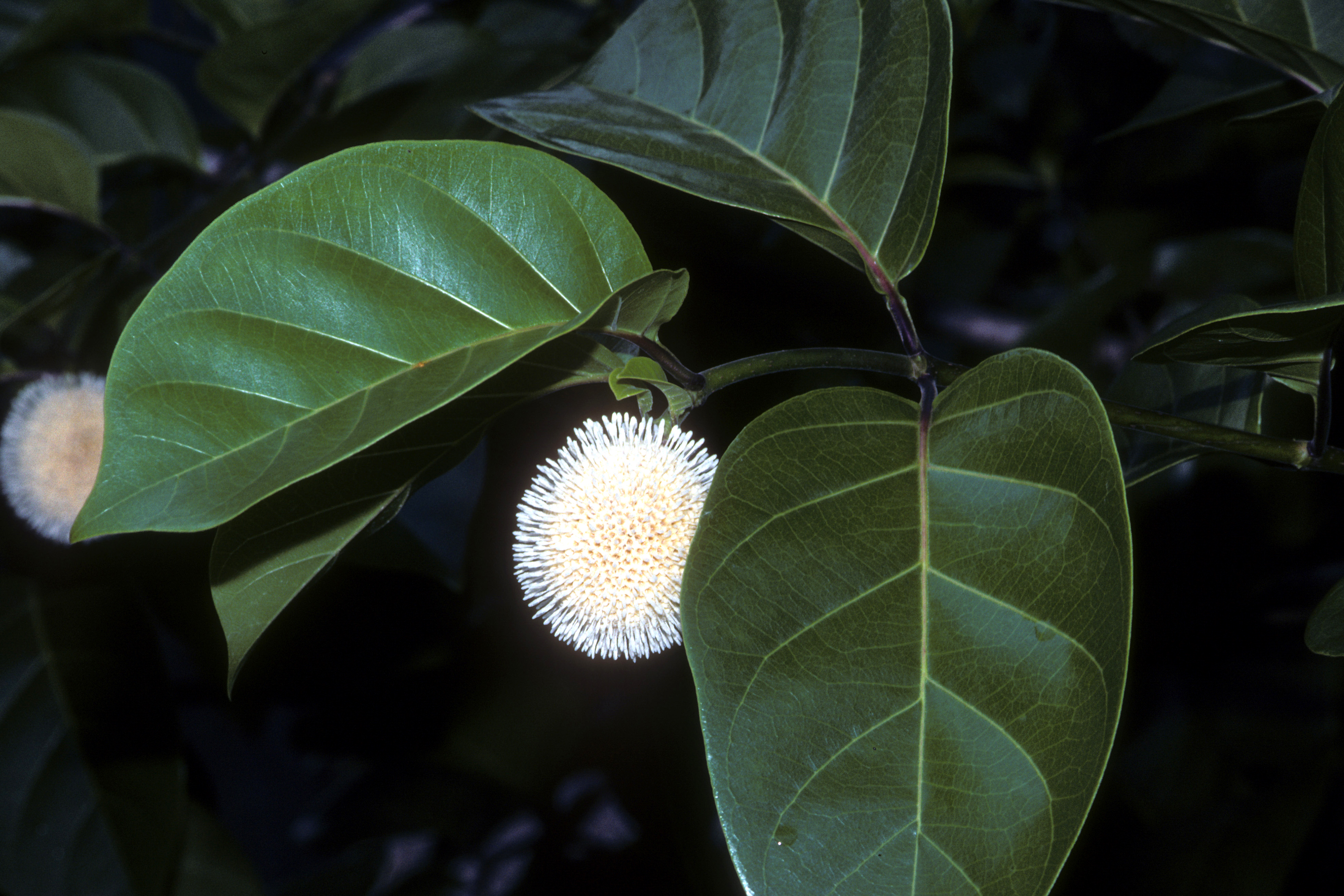
- Leaves and Inflorescence of Nauclea latifolia

Scientific classification
- Kingdom: Plantae
- Clade: Tracheophytes
- Clade: Angiosperms
- Clade: Eudicots
- Clade: Asterids
- Order: Gentianales
- Family: Rubiaceae
- Genus: Nauclea
- Species: N. latifolia

Binomial name
- Nauclea latifolia Sm.

Synonyms
- Sarcocephalus latifolius

= Nauclea latifolia =

Species of plant

Nauclea latifolia, also known by its common name African peach, is a species of flowering plant in the family Rubiaceae, native to tropical regions of sub-Saharan Africa.

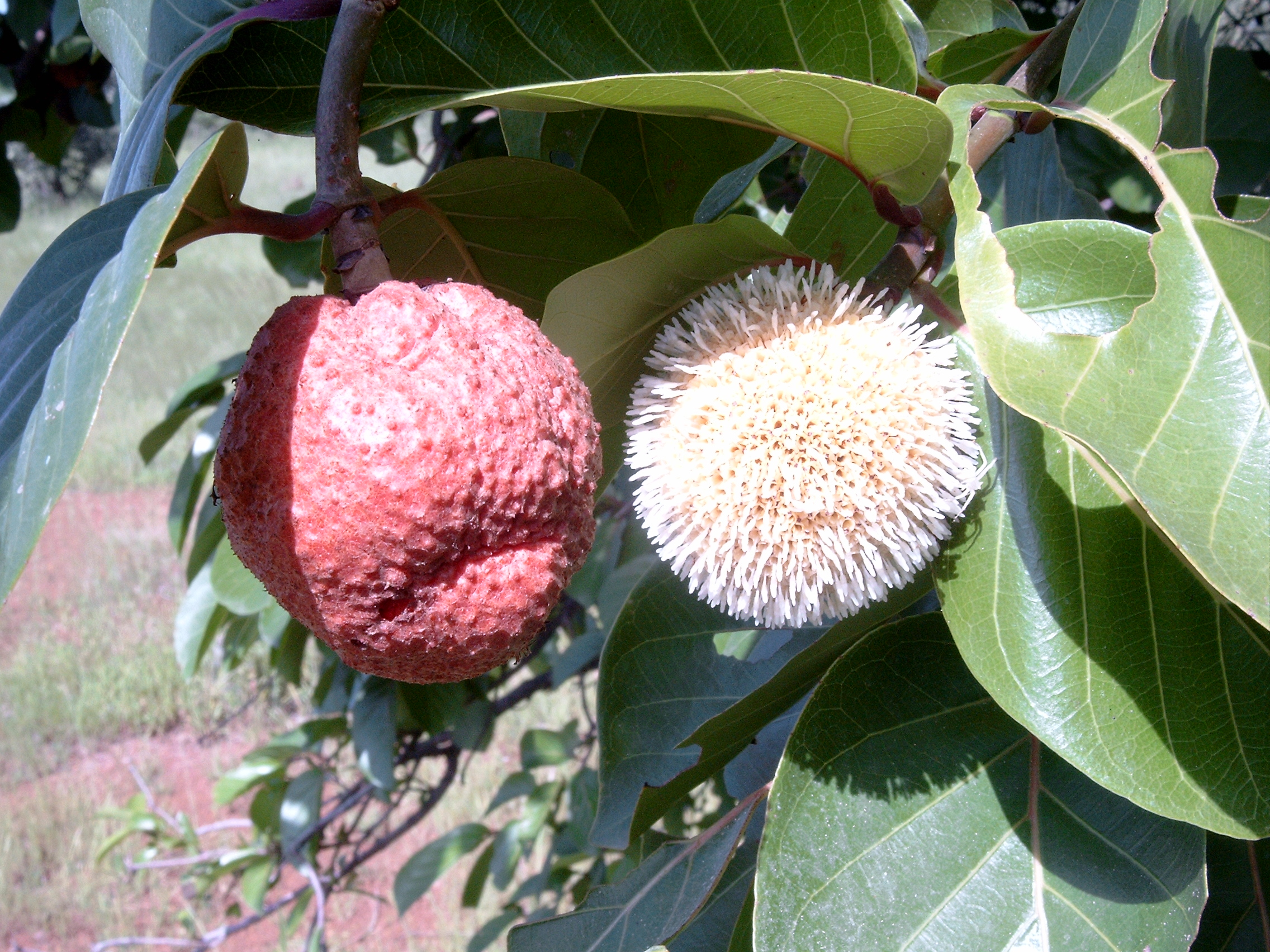
Fruit and flower of Nauclea latifolia

It grows as a spreading deciduous or evergreen shrub or small tree, typically 4–6 m tall, though it may reach greater heights under favorable forest conditions. The species is characterized by a multi-stemmed habit, rough dark grey-brown bark, opposite glossy green leaves, and terminal spherical heads of small, fragrant white to yellowish flowers. It produces fleshy syncarp fruits up to 8 cm in diameter containing numerous small seeds embedded in sweet, edible pink pulp.

It is widely known in traditional African medicine as "African quinine" due to its antimalarial properties. Various parts of the plant, including roots, bark, leaves, and fruits, are used to treat fever, pain, diarrhea, diabetes, and infectious diseases, while the fruits are consumed as a famine food rich in carbohydrates, vitamins, and minerals.

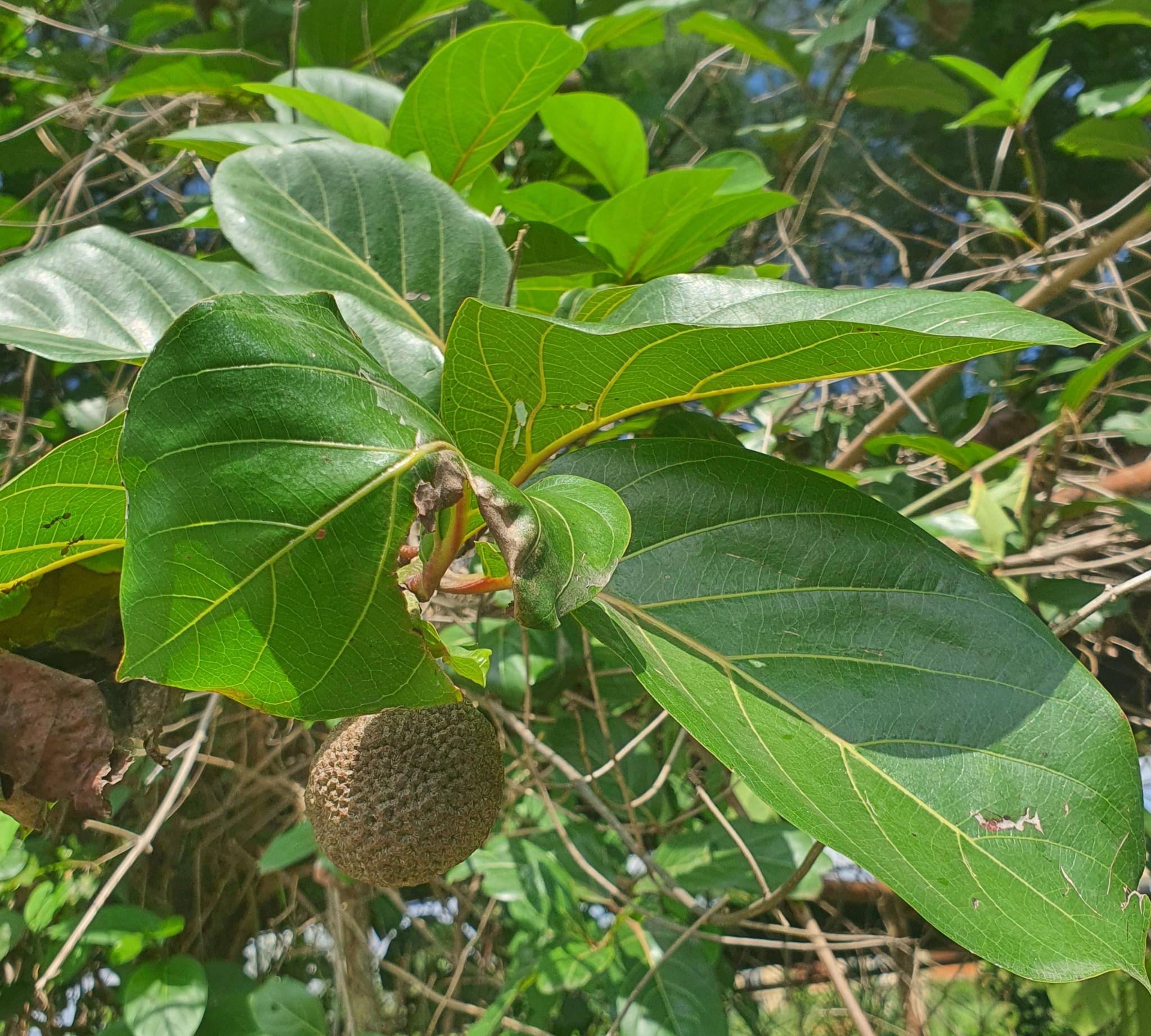
Leaves and fruit of Nauclea latifolia

== Taxonomy ==
It was first described scientifically by the British botanist James Edward Smith in 1813. The species has historically been placed in the genus Sarcocephalus, and a widely cited synonym is Sarcocephalus latifolius (Sm.) E.A. Bruce.

The genus name Nauclea derives from the Ancient Greek naus (ship) and kleio (to close), referring to the structure of the fruit, while the species epithet latifolia originates from Latin latus (broad) and folium (leaf), describing the plant's broad leaves.

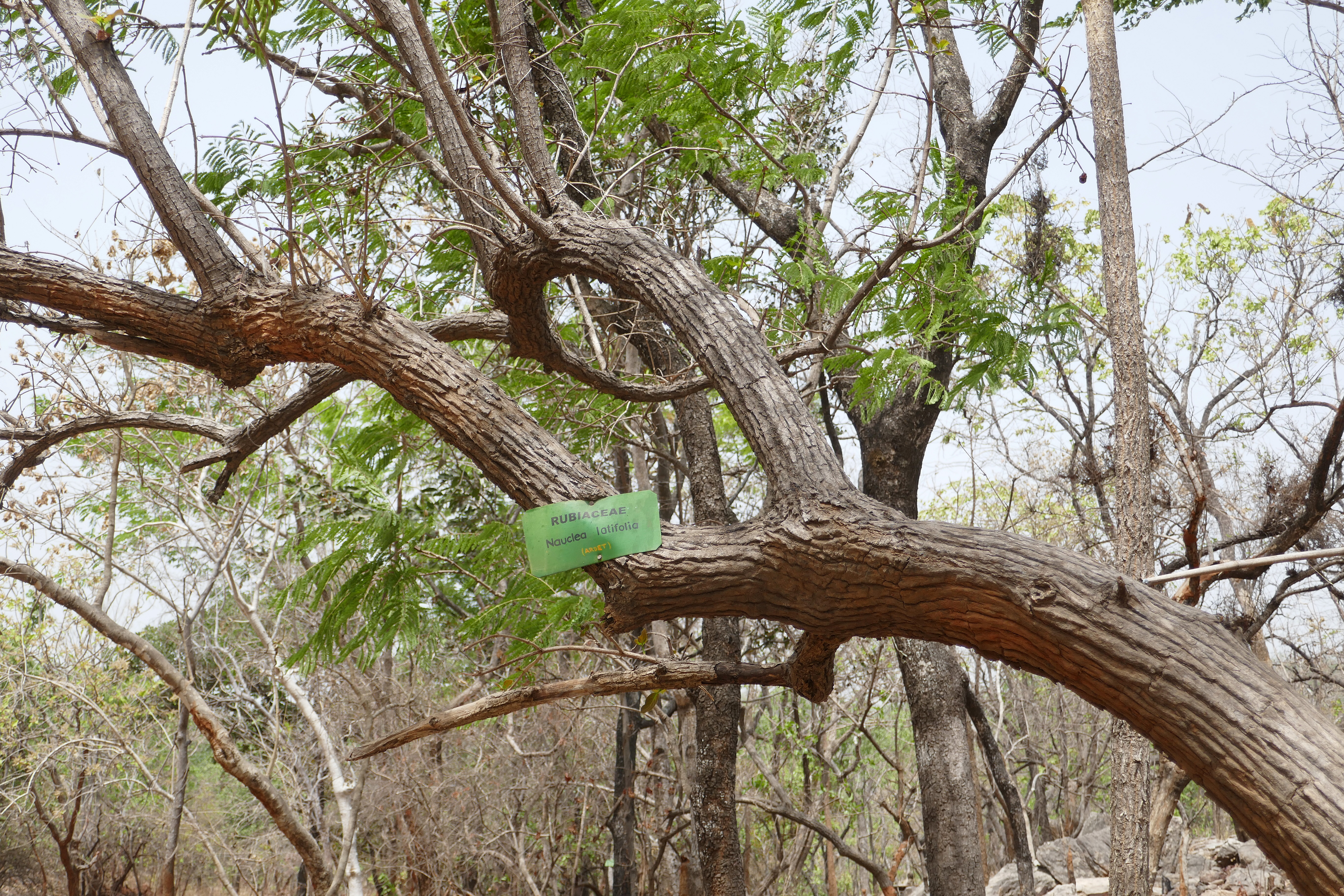
Nauclea latifolia tree in Benin

Modern phylogenetic studies support the inclusion of African species such as N. latifolia within a broadly circumscribed Nauclea to maintain monophyly of the genus.

== Common names ==
It is known by numerous vernacular names across its native range in sub-Saharan Africa, reflecting its wide cultural and ethnobotanical importance.

In Nigeria, common names in Hausa include tafashiya, tashiyaigia, tuwon biri, and marga, while in Igbo it is known as ubulu inu or uvuru-ilu. In Yoruba-speaking regions, it is called egbésí or ogbésí.

Among the Ibibio and Efik peoples of southern Nigeria, the plant is referred to as mbom-ibong or mbom mbog.

In Cameroon, particularly among speakers of the Tupuri language, the species is called koumkouma.

In Senegal, Wolof speakers refer to the plant as nâdok or nâdop, while in Mali it is known in Bambara as bari or bati.

In South Sudan, the plant is locally known as Donkolon.

== Description ==
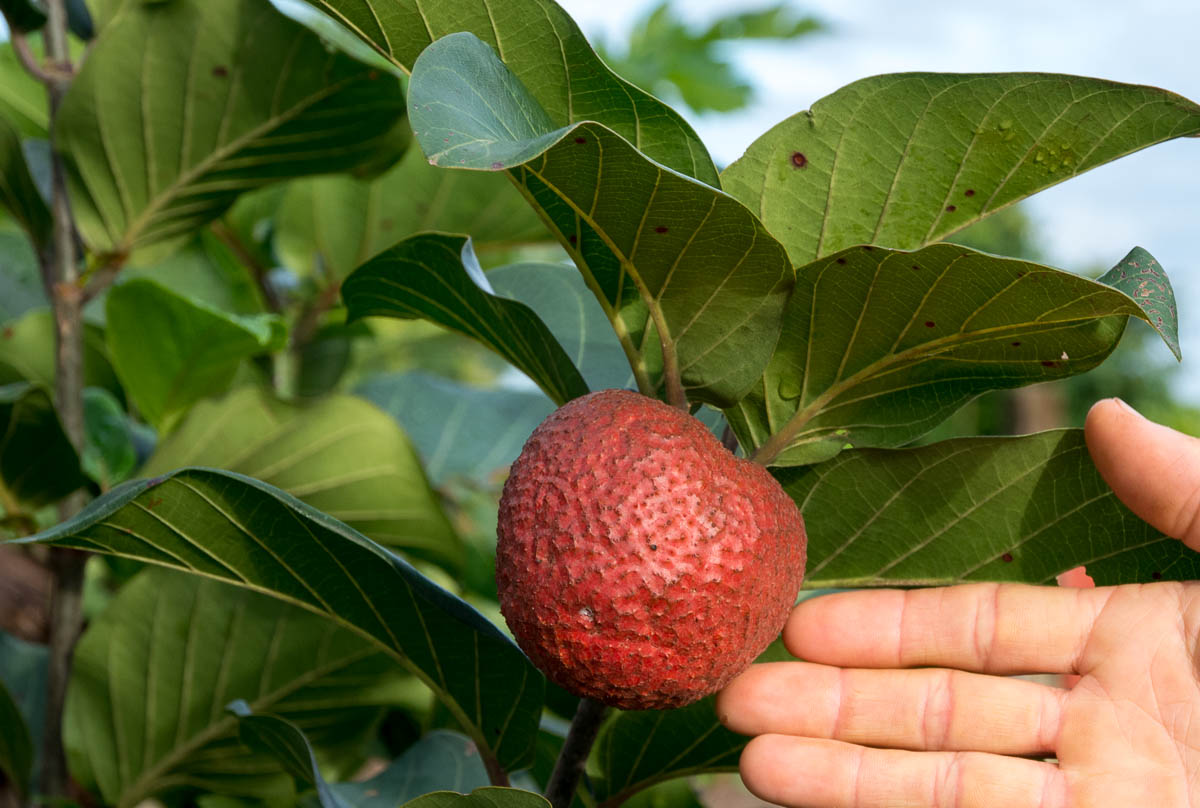
Fruit of Nauclea latifolia

It is an open-canopied shrub or tree with low branching and a straggling, multi-stemmed habit when young. The bark is rough, fibrous, and gray to dark gray in color. The leaves are opposite, simple, elliptic to obovate, measuring 10–22 cm long, with a leathery texture, glossy green upper surface, and paler underside with prominent pinnate venation.

Inflorescences are solitary, terminal, spherical heads 4–5 cm in diameter, composed of numerous small, tubular, fragrant flowers. The fruits are compound syncarps that mature from green to deep red and contain sweet, watery pulp surrounding numerous tiny seeds.

== Distribution and habitat ==
The species is native to tropical Africa, occurring from Senegal and Gambia in the west through West and Central Africa to Ethiopia, Uganda, and Angola. It is commonly found in savanna woodlands, dry forests, and gallery forests along rivers, from sea level up to approximately 1,200 m in elevation.

It prefers tropical to subtropical climates with annual rainfall between 1,000 and 2,700 mm and grows best in well-drained loamy or sandy soils, though it tolerates poor and disturbed soils.

== Ecology ==
The species is pollinated primarily by insects, particularly bees and butterflies attracted to its fragrant flowers. Its fruits are dispersed mainly by animals such as baboons, monkeys, birds, and other frugivores, which consume the pulp and excrete the seeds at distances from the parent plant.

It plays an important ecological role as a pioneer species in savanna and riparian ecosystems, contributing to soil stabilization and providing food resources for wildlife, including elephants and antelopes.

== Uses ==
=== Traditional medicine ===
The plant is extensively used in traditional medicine throughout West and Central Africa. Bark decoctions are commonly used to treat malaria, fever, and dysentery; roots are employed for wounds, rheumatism, and pain; leaves are used for diarrhea and respiratory ailments; and fruits are used for gastrointestinal disorders.

Though there have been reports of findings of the opioid tramadol in the bark of the tree, later studies have found that the tramadol is actually synthetic and most probably connected to the widespread opioid misuse in the native regions of the tree.

=== Other uses ===
The wood of Nauclea latifolia is termite-resistant and is used for firewood, charcoal, and small-scale carpentry. The edible fruits are consumed as a famine food, while bark and roots are used as sources of natural dyes. Leaves are also used as livestock fodder during dry seasons.

== Conservation ==
It has not been formally assessed by the IUCN Red List, but its wide distribution and generally abundant populations suggest a low risk of global extinction. Localized threats include habitat loss due to agricultural expansion and overharvesting for medicinal use. The species occurs in several protected areas, and community-based conservation initiatives promote sustainable use and reforestation.
