= Bilinga (wood) =

Type of wood

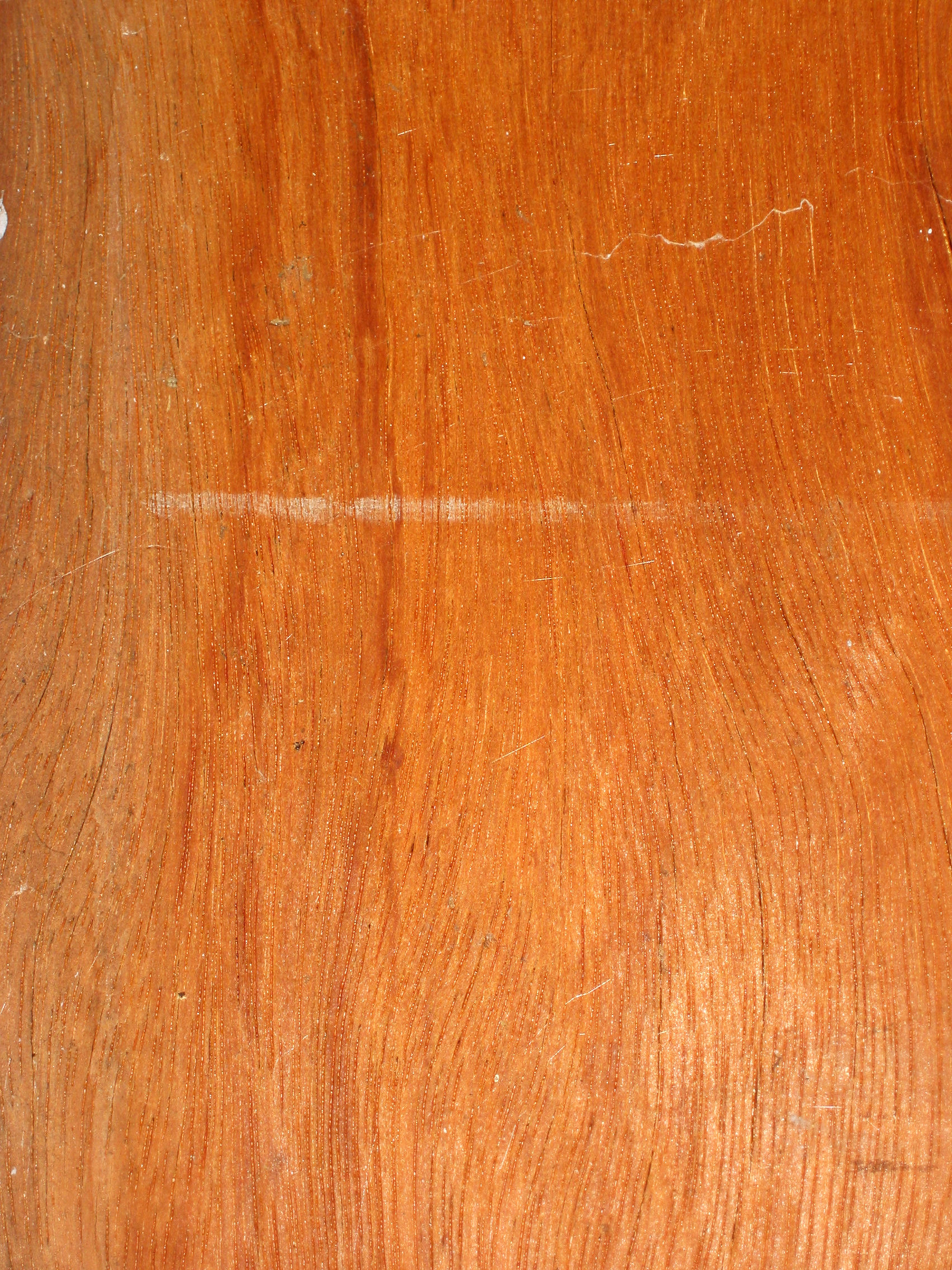
Bilinga panelling

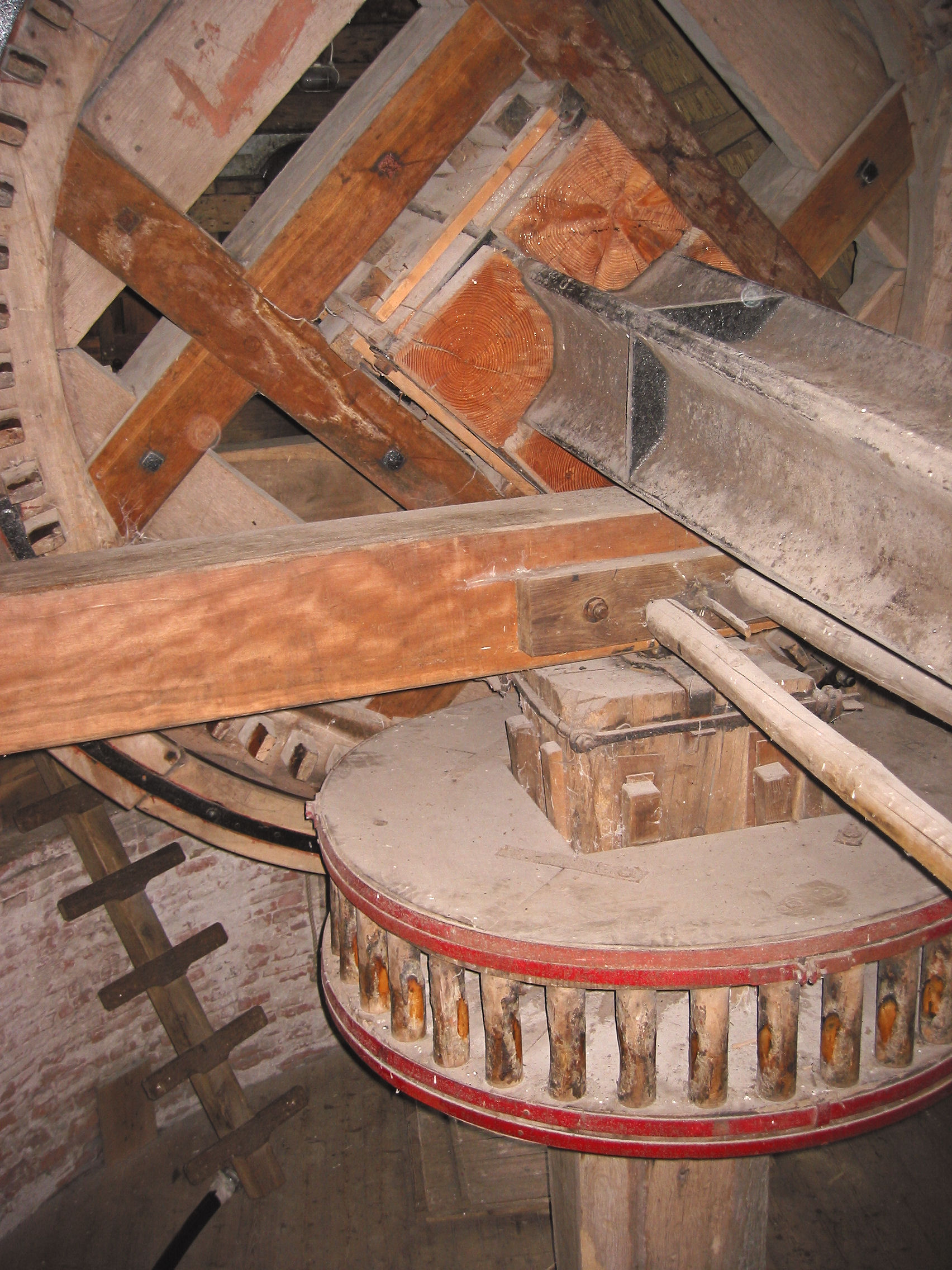
Windmill machinery at De Hoop - Beams are made of bilinga

Bilinga (also called Aloma in Germany and Opepe in England) is an African wood, from Nauclea diderrichii trees in the family Rubiaceae.

The wood, which grows across tropical Africa from Sierra Leone to Uganda, has about the same density as true hickory, but is not quite as strong. The wood is extremely heavy. Log diameter is from 60 to 90 centimetres (24 to 35 in). The heartwood is golden yellow to orange yellow, and slightly shimmering. The sapwood has an interlocking grain.

In temperate climates, the wood is very durable against fungi, and durable against dry wood borers and termites. It is suitable for use in a marine environment. Bilinga may be used for railway sleepers, poles, hydraulic works, bridges and ship planking and flooring. It may also be used for heavy industrial flooring. The wood may also be used for veneer and cabinet work.
