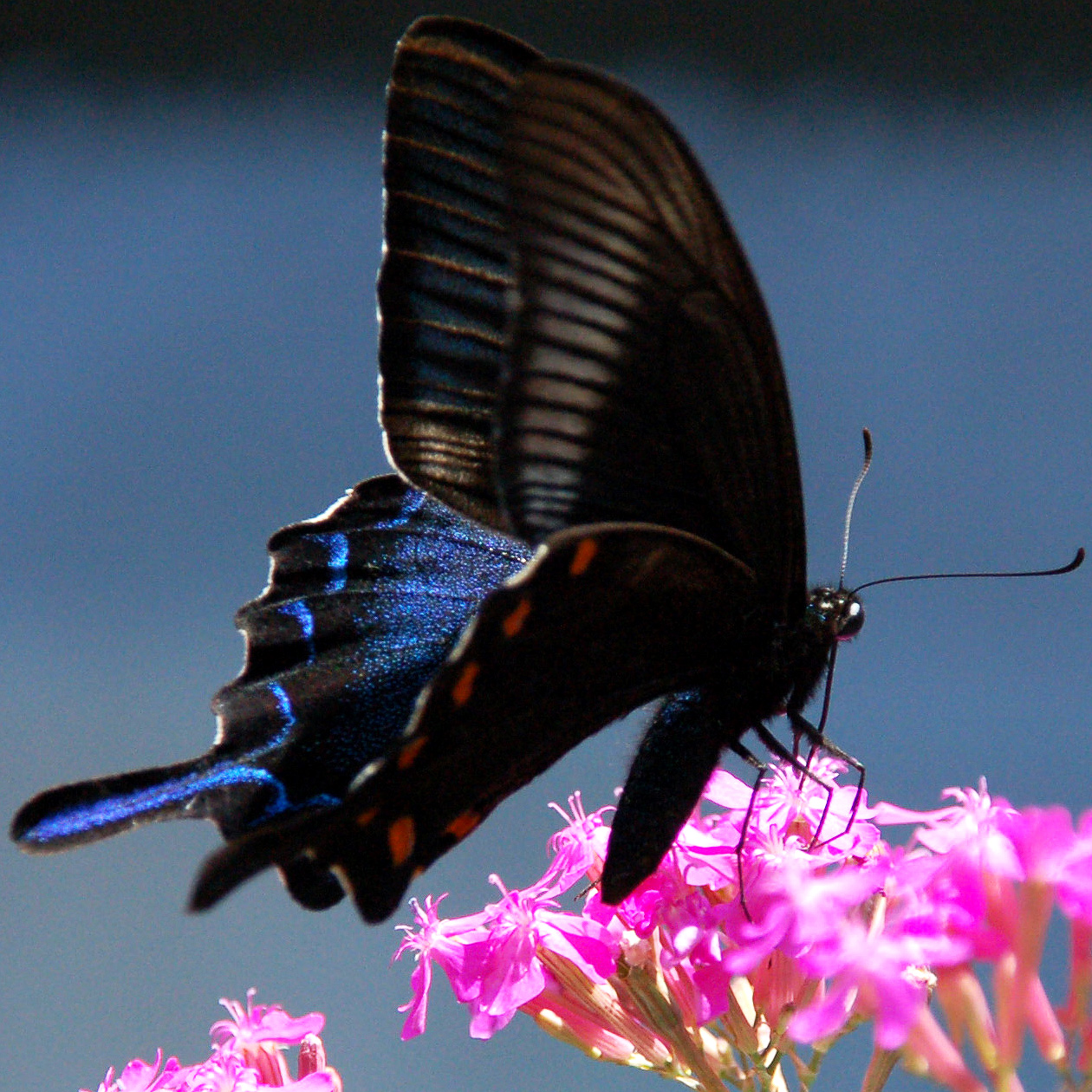
- Papilio bianor

Scientific classification
- Kingdom: Animalia
- Phylum: Arthropoda
- Clade: Pancrustacea
- Class: Insecta
- Order: Lepidoptera
- Family: Papilionidae
- Genus: Papilio
- Subgenus: Achillides; Hübner, 1819

= Achillides =

Subgenus of butterflies

Achillides, the peacock swallowtails, are a subgenus within the genus Papilio containing 29 species and over 100 subspecies distributed across the Indo-Australian Archipelago from East Russia, the Indian subcontinent and to Australia.

== Species ==
- Papilio arcturus Westwood, 1842 – blue peacock
- Papilio arjuna Horsfield, 1828
- Papilio bianor Cramer, [1777] – Chinese peacock
- Papilio blumei Boisduval, 1836 – green swallowtail
- Papilio buddha Westwood, 1872 – Malabar banded peacock
- Papilio chikae Igarashi, 1965 – Luzon peacock swallowtail
- Papilio crino Fabricius, 1793 – common banded peacock
- Papilio daedalus C. Felder & R. Felder, 1861
- Papilio dehaanii C. Felder & R. Felder, 1864
- Papilio dialis Leech, 1893 – southern Chinese peacock
- Papilio elephenor Doubleday, 1845 – yellow-crested spangle
- Papilio hermeli Nuyda, 1992
- Papilio hoppo Matsumura, 1908
- Papilio karna C. & R. Felder, 1864
- Papilio krishna Moore, 1857 – Krishna peacock
- Papilio lorquinianus C. Felder & R. Felder, 1865 - sea green swallowtail
- Papilio maackii Ménétriés, 1859
- Papilio montrouzieri Boisduval, 1859
- Papilio neumoegeni Honrath, 1890
- Papilio orsippus Godman & Salvin, 1888
- Papilio palinurus Fabricius, 1787
- Papilio paris Linnaeus, 1758 – Paris peacock
- Papilio peranthus Fabricius, 1787
- Papilio pericles Wallace, 1865
- Papilio polyctor Boisduval, 1836
- Papilio ryukyuensis Fujioka, 1975
- Papilio syfanius Oberthür, 1886
- Papilio tamilana Moore, 1881
- Papilio telegonus C. Felder & R. Felder, 1860
- Papilio ulysses Linnaeus, 1758 - blue mountain butterfly
