= Spång =

Spång is a surname, and may refer to:

- Andreas Spång (born 1978), Swedish mixed martial arts fighter
- Frida Gustafsson Spång (born 1993), Swedish professional golfer
- Mimmi Spång (born 1973), Swedish film producer

== See also ==
- Spang
- Spong
