= Spangles =

Spangles may refer to:

- Spangles (sweets), a brand of boiled sweets manufactured by Mars Ltd in the United Kingdom
- Spangles (1926 film), a 1926 silent film drama
- Spangles (1928 film), a 1928 British silent drama film
- Spangles (restaurant), a family-owned fast food chain based in Wichita, Kansas
- Spangles Muldoon (1946–2008), British radio broadcaster

== See also ==
- Spangle (disambiguation)
