= Spangle =

Spangle may refer to:

- Spangle (or sequin), a small, thin, often circular piece of glittering metal or other material, used especially for decorating garments
- Spangle, the aesthetic feature of visible crystallites on the surface of galvanized steel
- Spangle, Washington, United States
- Spangle (novel), a 1987 historical novel by Gary Jennings
- Spangle (Papilio protenor), a swallowtail butterfly of India
- Yellow-crested spangle (Papilio elephenor), a swallowtail butterfly of India
- Spangle Lake
- Gold spangle, a moth of the family Noctuidae
- Radial Spangle, an indie rock band from Norman, Oklahoma, United States

== See also ==
- Spangles (disambiguation)
- Spang (disambiguation)
