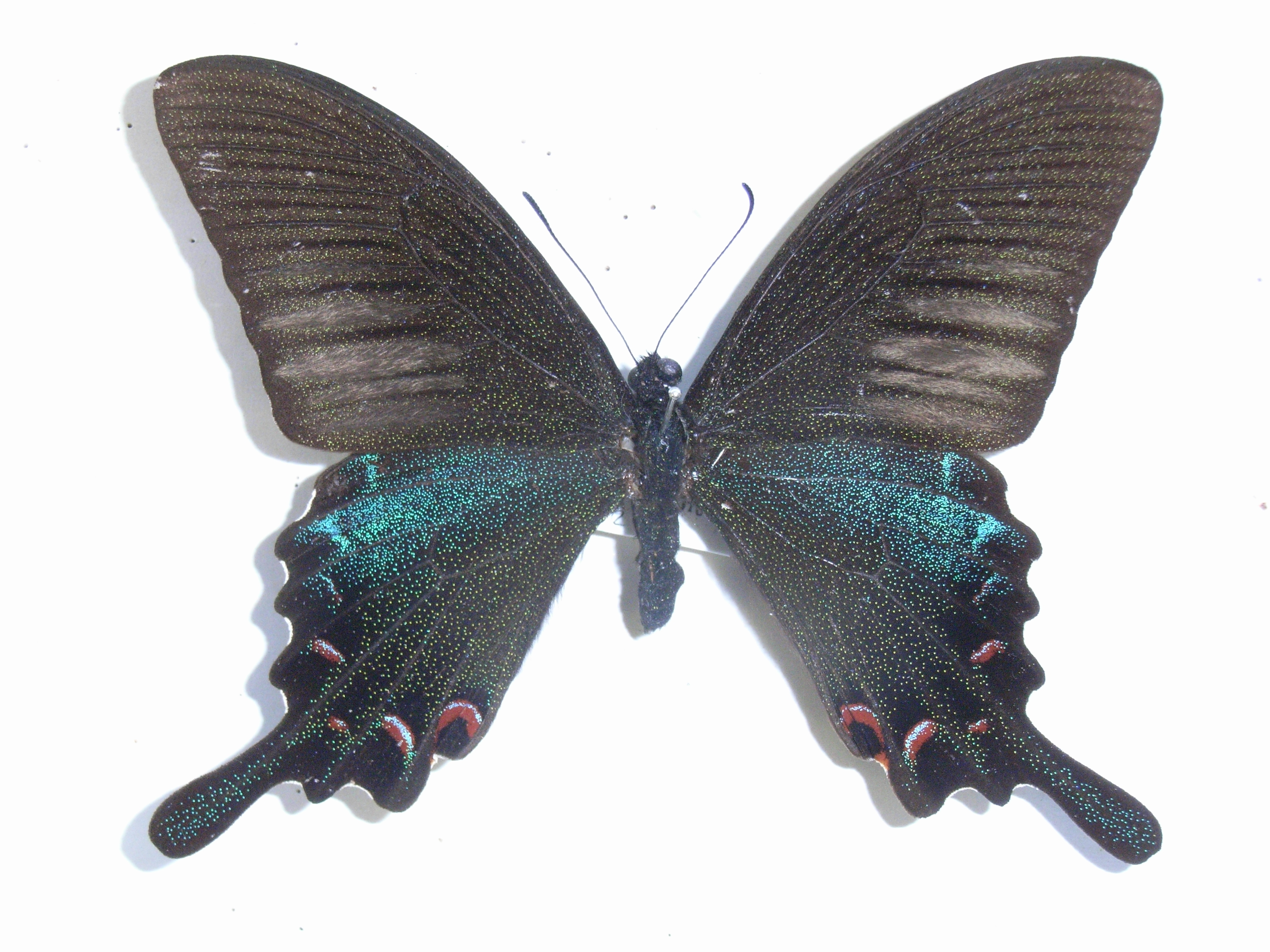
- Papilio (Achillides) dialis andronicus - museum specimen

Scientific classification
- Kingdom: Animalia
- Phylum: Arthropoda
- Clade: Pancrustacea
- Class: Insecta
- Order: Lepidoptera
- Family: Papilionidae
- Genus: Papilio
- Species: P. dialis

Binomial name
- Papilio dialis Leech, 1893
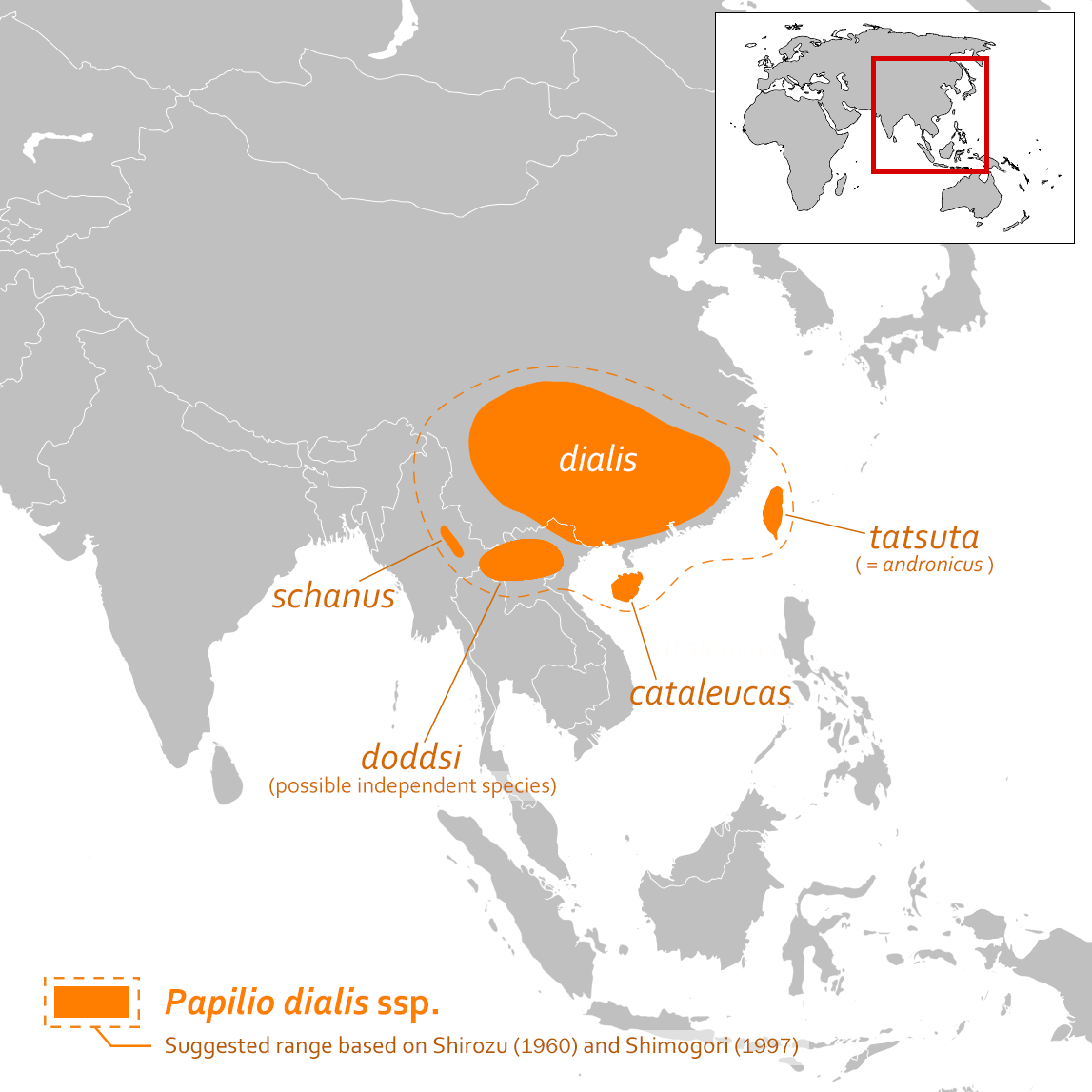
- Geographical range of Papilio dialis (with Papilio doddsi included)

= Papilio dialis =

Southern Chinese peacock

Species of butterfly

Papilio dialis, the southern Chinese peacock, is a species of swallowtail butterfly, native to China (including Hainan), Taiwan and Burma

== Description ==
Body black, above dusted with metallic scales. Upper surface of the wings dusted with green, hindwing with blue tinge in the costal region, but without metallic patch, at the anal angle a red ring; the tail is absent, or is stunted, or as long and broad as in Papilio bianor, with all the intermediate stages. The under surface similar to that of bianor, but the forewing always less extended dark than in the respective form of bianor from the same country. The scent-streaks of the male always narrow and widely separated, of much more uniform width than in Papilio polyctor, in which the stripes are likewise separated. The female is less densely metallically scaled than the male and has on the upperside of the hindwing a red submarginal spot behind the 2. median. The earlier stages are unknown. The butterfly is rare in collections. Hans Fruhstorfer is the only collector who captured even a small series. He found the insect near the native habitations on refuse-heaps before and among the huts, as well as on the moist sand of a river-bank. Though the butterfly is very shy, yet when driven away it frequently returned again to the same place. When feeding it always keeps the wings closed.During its circling, hovering flight it presents a fine spectacle by its graceful movements (Fruhstorfer). Distributed from the Shan States to Central China and Formosa. The genitalia of most species of this group are so similar that scarcely any distinct differences can be shown.

== Taxonomy ==
It is a member of the species group paris
