= Blue peacock =

Blue peacock may refer to:

- Indian peafowl, bird species also known as blue peafowl
- Papilio arcturus, butterfly species also known as the "blue peacock"
- Blue Peacock, British nuclear weapons project

== See also ==
- Tawûsî Melek, Yazidi religious figure, sometimes represented as a blue peacock
