= Papilio doddsi =

Scientific classification
- Kingdom: Animalia
- Phylum: Arthropoda
- Clade: Pancrustacea
- Class: Insecta
- Order: Lepidoptera
- Family: Papilionidae
- Genus: Papilio
- Species: P. doddsi

Binomial name
- Papilio doddsi Janet, 1896
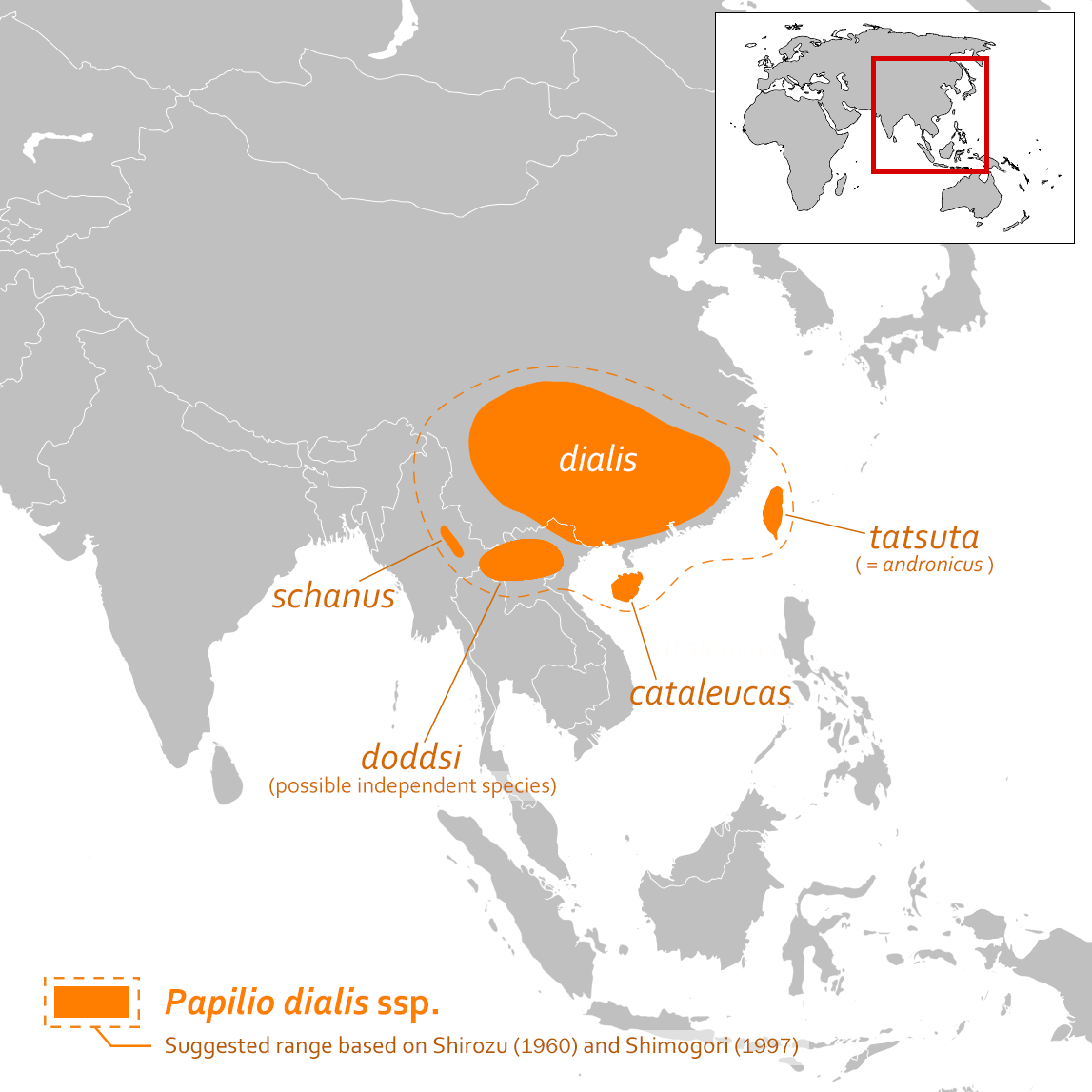
- Geographical range of Papilio dialis (with doddsi included as a subspecies)

Synonyms
- Papilio megei Oberthür, 1899

Species of butterfly

Papilio doddsi is a species of swallowtail butterfly from the genus Papilio that is found in Vietnam.

== Description ==
Resembles Papilio dialis. Tail either quite short or long, broad and spatulate, with all the intermediate stages. Male only with red anal eye-spot on the upperside of the hindwing, female in addition with red submarginal spot. The black basal area on the underside of the forewing reaches to the base of the upper median, and in the female, which I [Jordan] only know from the description, probably does not extend quite so far. Tonkin. Karl Jordan in Seitz.

== Taxonomy ==
It is a member of the species group paris

== Other sources ==
- Erich Bauer and Thomas Frankenbach, 1998 Schmetterlinge der Erde, Butterflies of the world Part I (1), Papilionidae Papilionidae I: Papilio, Subgenus Achillides, Bhutanitis, Teinopalpus. Edited by Erich Bauer and Thomas Frankenbach. Keltern : Goecke & Evers; Canterbury : Hillside Books ISBN 9783931374624
