= Papilio longimacula =

Scientific classification
- Kingdom: Animalia
- Phylum: Arthropoda
- Clade: Pancrustacea
- Class: Insecta
- Order: Lepidoptera
- Family: Papilionidae
- Genus: Papilio
- Species: P. longimacula

Binomial name
- Papilio longimacula Z.G. Wang & Y. Niu, 2002

Species of butterfly

Papilio longimacula, is a species of butterfly in the family Papilionidae. It is found in China.

== Taxonomy ==
It is a member of the species group paris
