= Spang =

Spang is a surname, and may refer to:

- Anne Spang (born 1967), German biochemist, cell biologist and academic
- Bently Spang (born 1960), American Cheyenne artist
- Dan Spang (born 1983), American-Italian ice hockey player
- Jonatan Spang, Danish standup comedian and actor
- Judith Spang (born 1946), American politician from New Hampshire
- Laurette Spang-McCook (born 1951), American actress
- Matt Ross-Spang (born 1987), American record producer
- Michael Grundt Spang (1931–2003), Norwegian journalist and writer
- Michael Henry Spang (died 1762), Danish sculptor

== See also ==
- Spång
- Spang Township, Itasca County, Minnesota
- Spangle (disambiguation)
- Spanging, another term for begging
