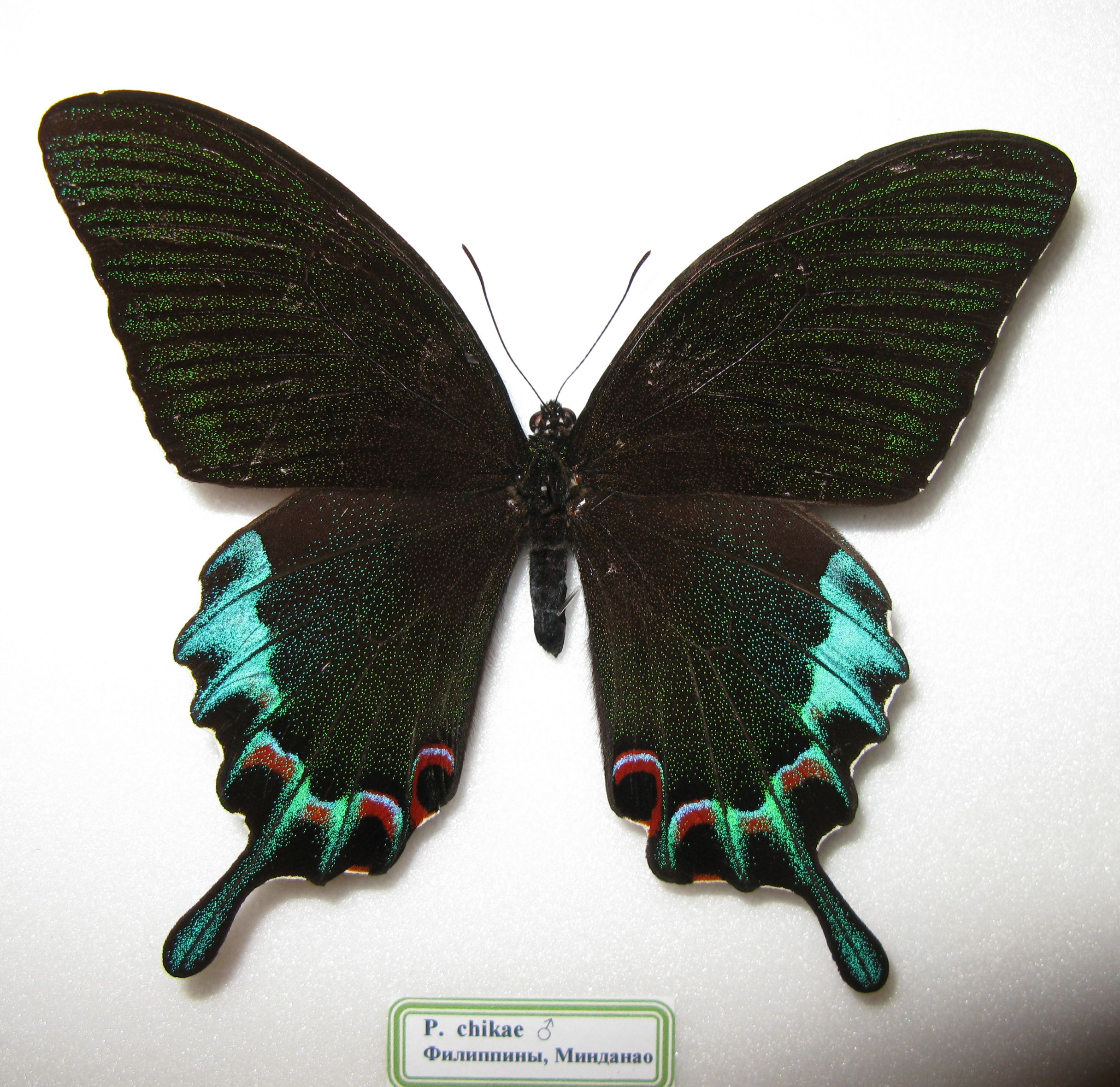
- Male

Conservation status
- Endangered (IUCN 2.3)
- CITES Appendix I

Scientific classification
- Kingdom: Animalia
- Phylum: Arthropoda
- Clade: Pancrustacea
- Class: Insecta
- Order: Lepidoptera
- Family: Papilionidae
- Genus: Papilio
- Species: P. chikae

Binomial name
- Papilio chikae Igarashi, 1965

= Papilio chikae =

Species of butterfly

Papilio chikae, the Luzon peacock swallowtail, is a species of butterfly in the family Papilionidae. It was first described in 1965 and is endemic to the island of Luzon in the Philippines.

It is listed as endangered by the IUCN and ESA, and is included on Appendix I of CITES, thereby making commercial international trade illegal.

== Description ==
Male Luzon peacock swallowtail have golden-green scales on the tops of their forewings and hindwings, with the hindwings having green and red patches. Their wing tails are relatively long and narrow with green patches. Female Luzon peacock swallowtails have longer tails.

== Habitat and distribution ==
Papilio chikae are found at elevations of 1500 meters and above in the northern region of the island of Luzon. They can be found around Mt. Santo Tomas but not the nearby Sierra Madre mountain range, which is presumably at too low of an altitude. They can be found from February through October. Their high altitude habitat is disrupted by meadows, shrub land, and ravines.

== Taxonomy ==
Until recently, Papilio chikae was described as having two subspecies: P. c. chikae, endemic to the island of Luzon and P. c. hermeli, endemic to the island of Mindoro, however new information about the genetic makeup of the subspecies lead to the reclassification of P. c. hermeli as its own species: P. hermeli.

== Species group ==
It is a member of the species group paris

== Other reading ==
- Erich Bauer and Thomas Frankenbach, 1998 Schmetterlinge der Erde, Butterflies of the World Part I (1), Papilionidae Papilionidae I: Papilio, Subgenus Achillides, Bhutanitis, Teinopalpus. Edited by Erich Bauer and Thomas Frankenbach. Keltern: Goecke & Evers; Canterbury: Hillside Books ISBN 9783931374624
