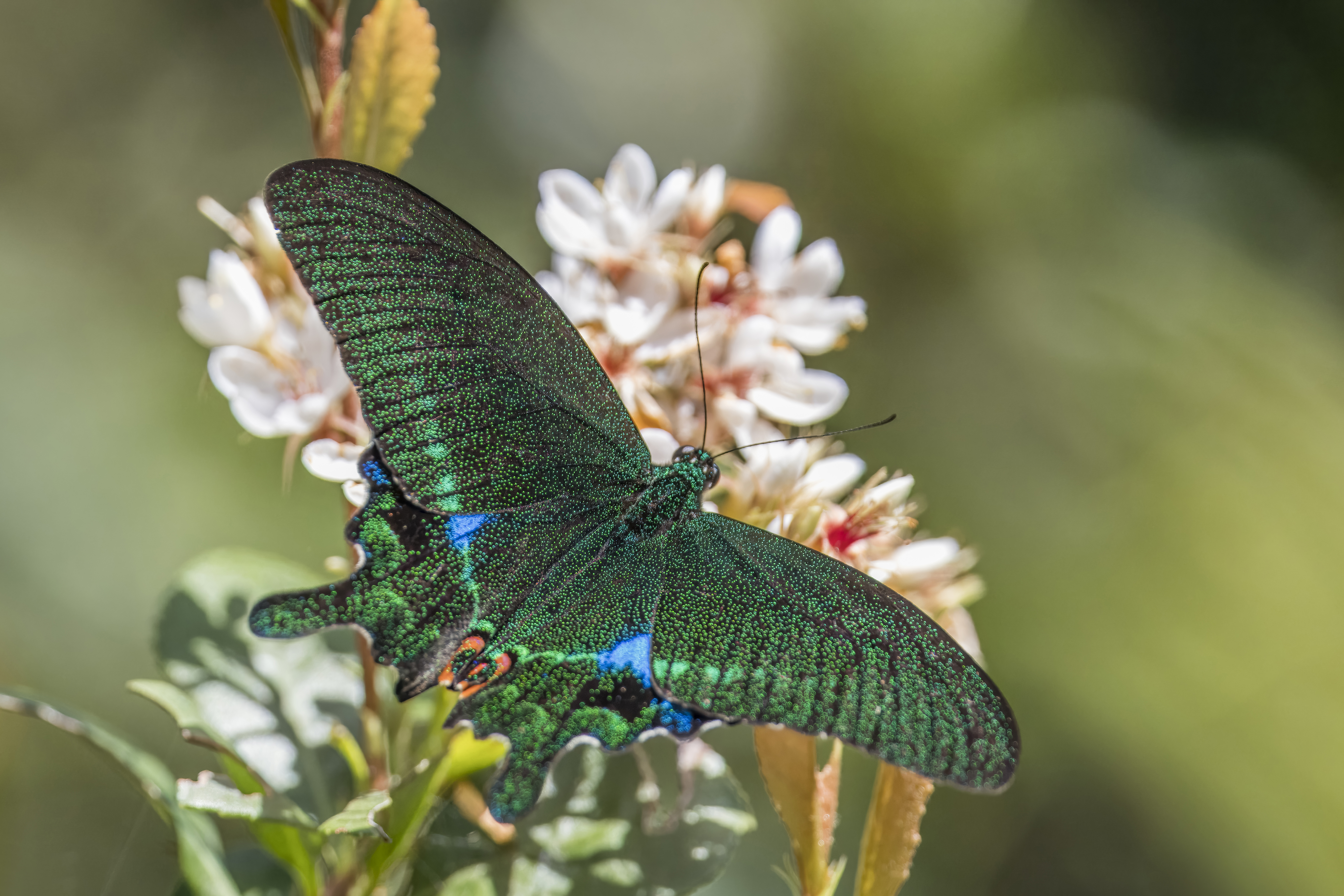

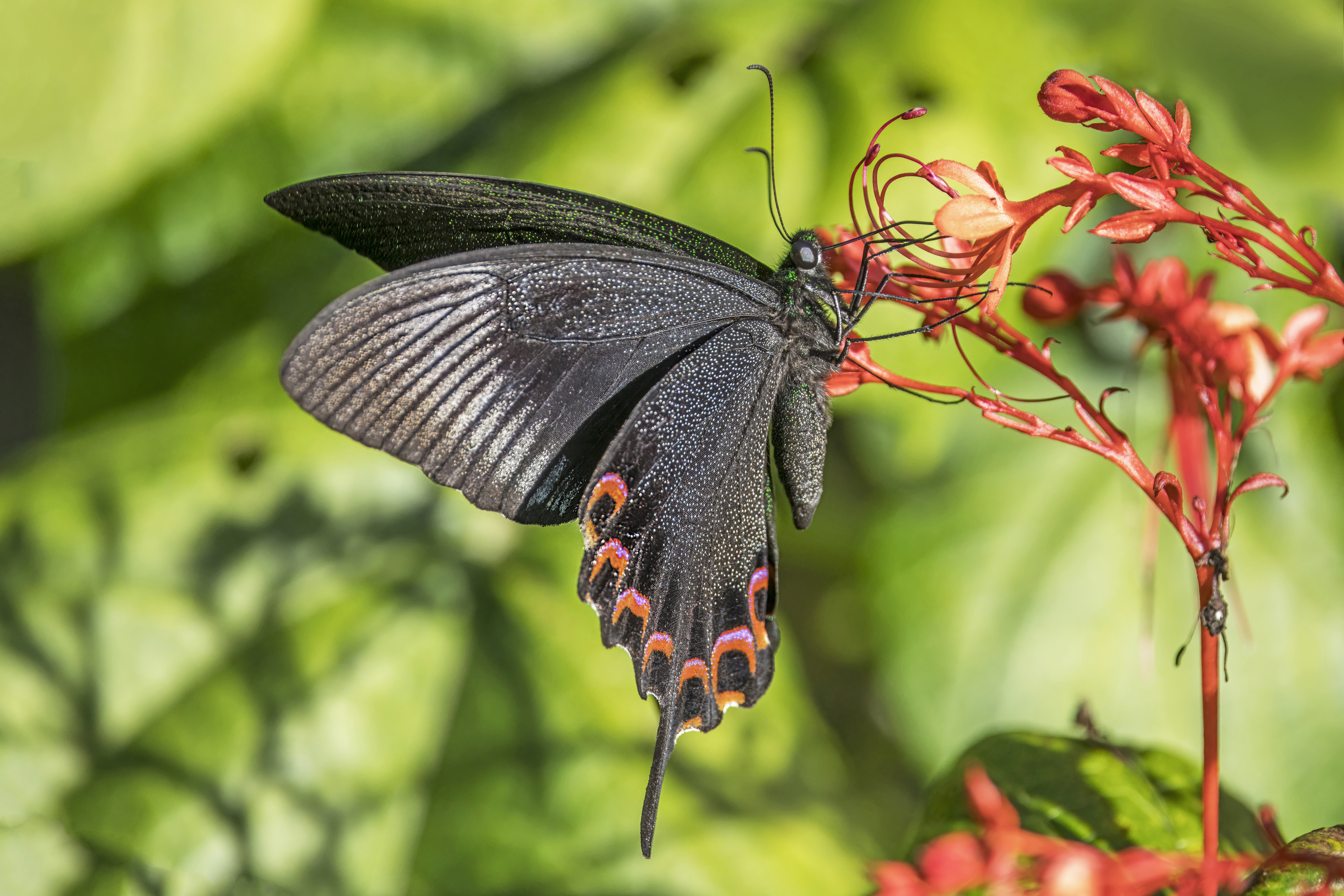
- both P. p. nakaharai, northern Taiwan

Scientific classification
- Kingdom: Animalia
- Phylum: Arthropoda
- Clade: Pancrustacea
- Class: Insecta
- Order: Lepidoptera
- Family: Papilionidae
- Genus: Papilio
- Species: P. paris

Binomial name
- Papilio paris Linnaeus, 1758

= Papilio paris =

Species of butterfly

Papilio paris, the Paris peacock swallowtail, is a species of swallowtail butterfly found in the Indian subcontinent and southeast Asia.

== Subspecies ==
- P. p. arjuna Horsfield, 1828 (central Java)
- P. p. battacorum Rothschild, 1908 (north-eastern Sumatra)
- P. p. chinensis Rothschild, 1895 (western China)
- P. p. gedeensis Fruhstorfer, 1893 (western Java)
- P. p. hermosanus Rebel, 1906 (central Taiwan, southern Taiwan)
- P. p. nakaharai Shirôzu, 1960 (northern Taiwan and Japan (Ryukyu Islands))
- P. p. paris Linnaeus, 1758 (north-western India, south-western China, northern Thailand, Vietnam, southern Burma)
- P. p. tamilana Linnaeus, 1758 (southern India)
- P. p. tenggerensis Fruhstorfer, 1893 (eastern Java)

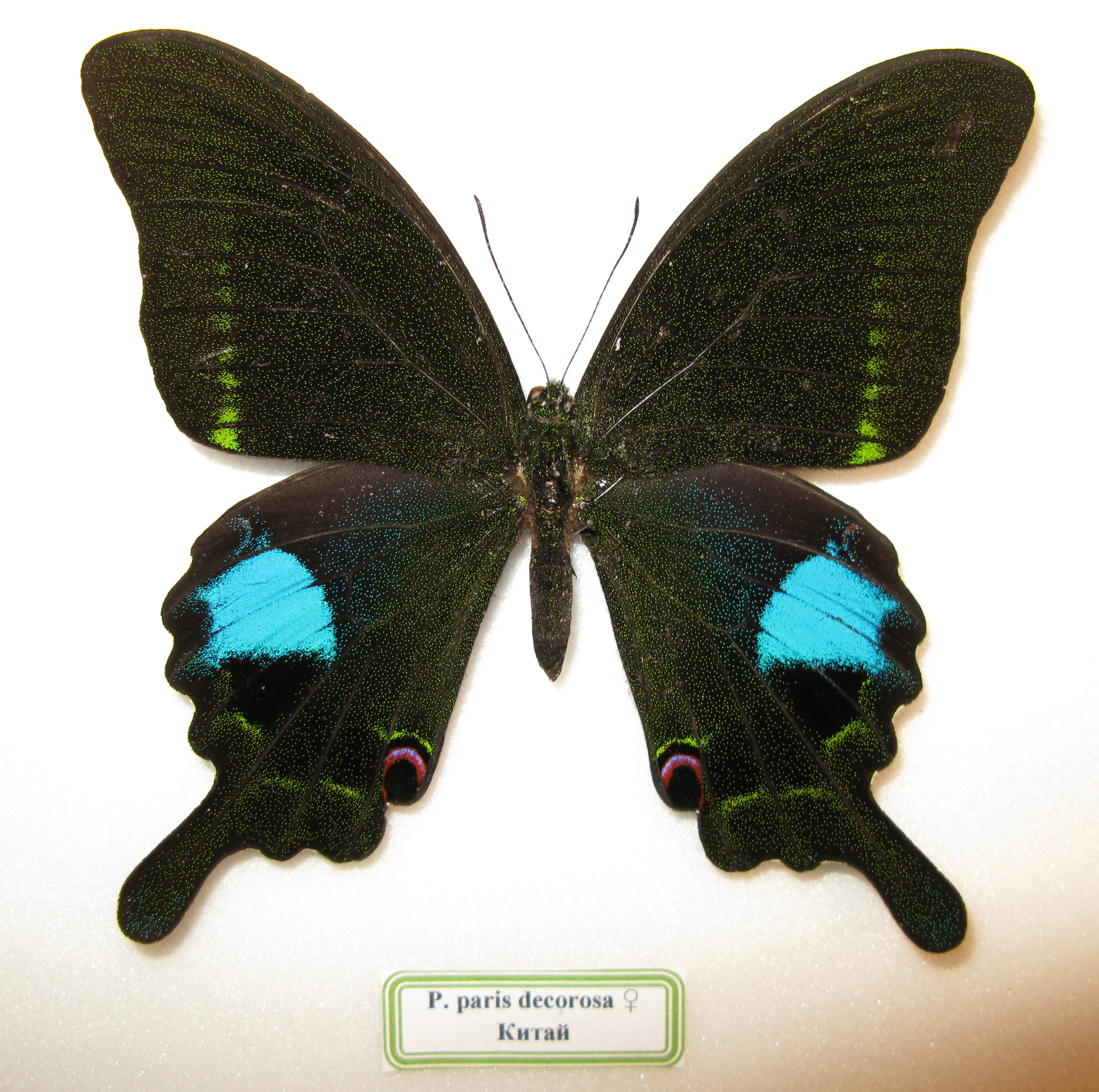
P. p. f. decorosa

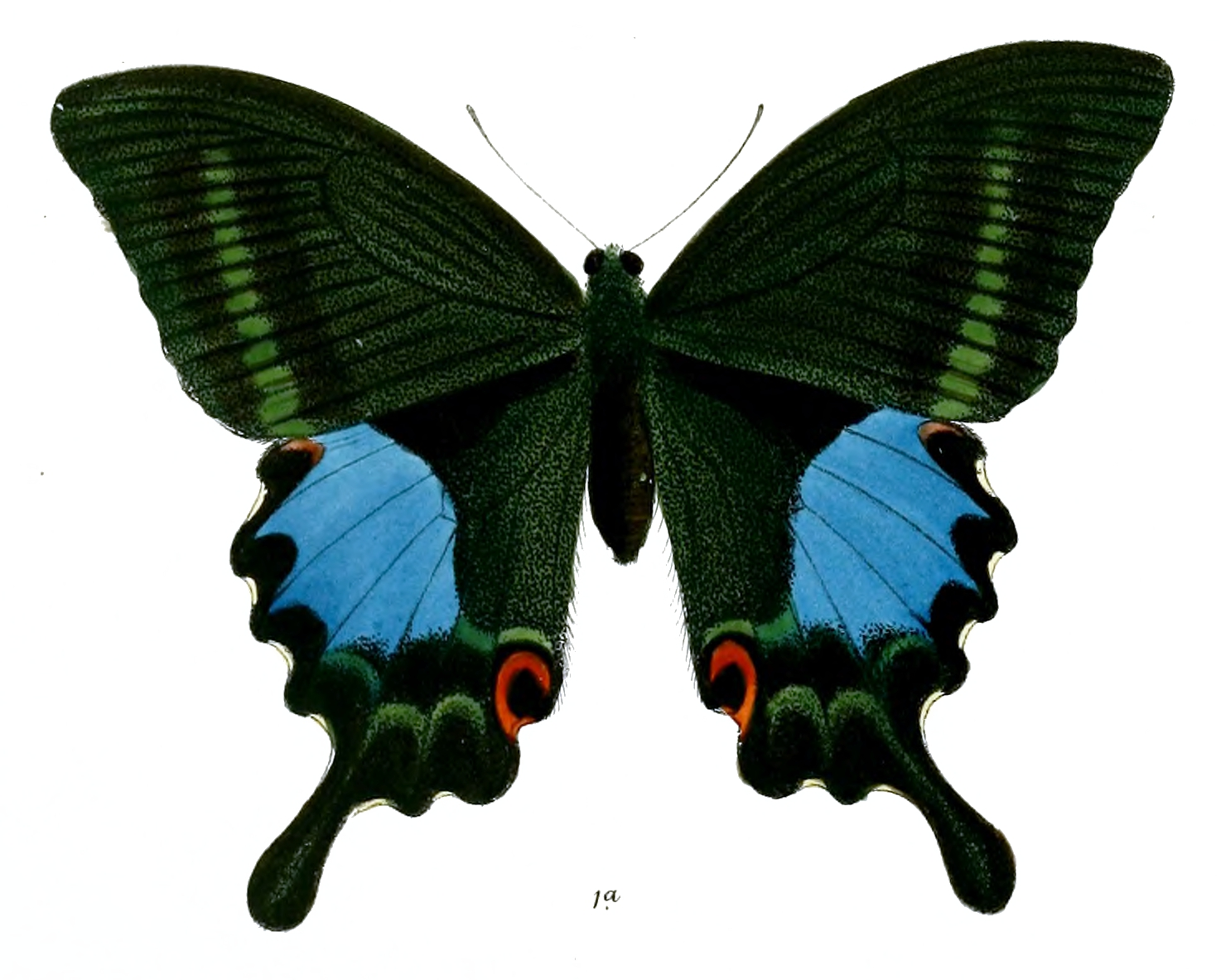
P. p. tamilana

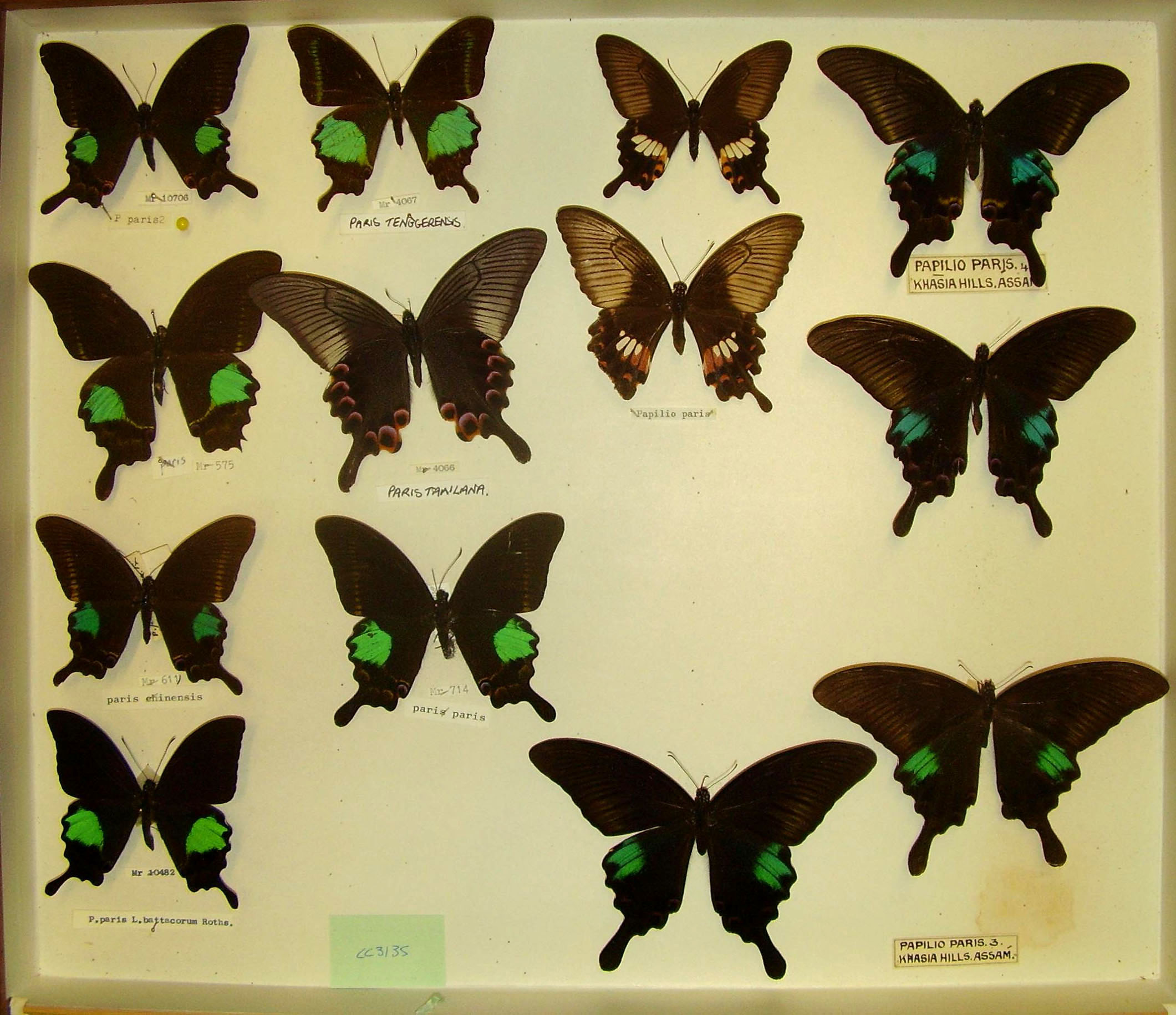
specimens showing variation

== Description ==
=== Male ===
Upperwings are black and irrorated (sprinkled) with dark green scales, which on the outer portion of the forewing coalesce and form an incomplete postdiscal narrow band which is straighter than the similar subterminal band on the forewing of Papilio polyctor.

On the hindwing, the irroration of dark green scales does not extend to the costal margin and is interrupted posteriorly by a broad postdiscal area, on both sides of which the green scales coalesce to form narrow diffuse bands; a conspicuous upper discal shining blue patch occupies the base of interspace 4 and outer portions of interspaces 5 and 6; this patch is variable in size, and in many specimens extends narrowly below and above the interspaces 3 and 7, respectively, its outer margin is uneven, its inner margin evenly arched; a prominent claret-red largely black-centred eyespots at the tornal angle, its inner margin with a transverse short violet-blue superposed line; in many specimens an obscure claret-red subterminal lunule in interspace 7.

Underside opaque black; bases of both forewings and hindwings, up to basal half of cell in forewing and up to apex of cell in hindwing, with an irroration of yellowish scales; also present more obscurely on the subterminal area in both wings. Forewing with a very broad elongate triangular pale area that does not extend to the termen, formed of internervular broad very pale ochraceous-white streaks, short near the tornus, gradually longer up to the costa. Hindwing: a prominent subterminal series of ochraceous-red lunules traversed by short violet-blue lines; in interspaces 1,2 and sometimes in 3, these lunules are formed into more or less complete largely black centred eyespots by the addition of an admarginal portion of the red ring. Cilia conspicuously white in the interspaces. Antennae, head, thorax and abdomen black, the latter three sprinkled with green scales above.

=== Female ===
Similar to the male but somewhat paler and duller. Upperside of the forewing has the green postdiscal band shorter and more incomplete than in the male. Hindwing with the upper discal patch smaller, often green and not blue, the red subterminal lunule in interspace 7 is always present and more prominent than in the male.

Underside of wings similar to that in the male, but the tornal and subtornal markings generally formed into more or less complete eyespots.

Wingspan: 106–132 mm

== Distribution ==
The Himalayas from Kumaon to Sikkim, Nepal and Bhutan; the hills of Assam, Burma and Tenasserim, extending to Thailand and the Malay Peninsula. A common insect in Sikkim, where it is found from the Terai up to 5,000 feet (1,500 m). It is rare in Burma and Tenasserim. It also occurs in some parts of the Western Ghats in India.

== Gallery ==
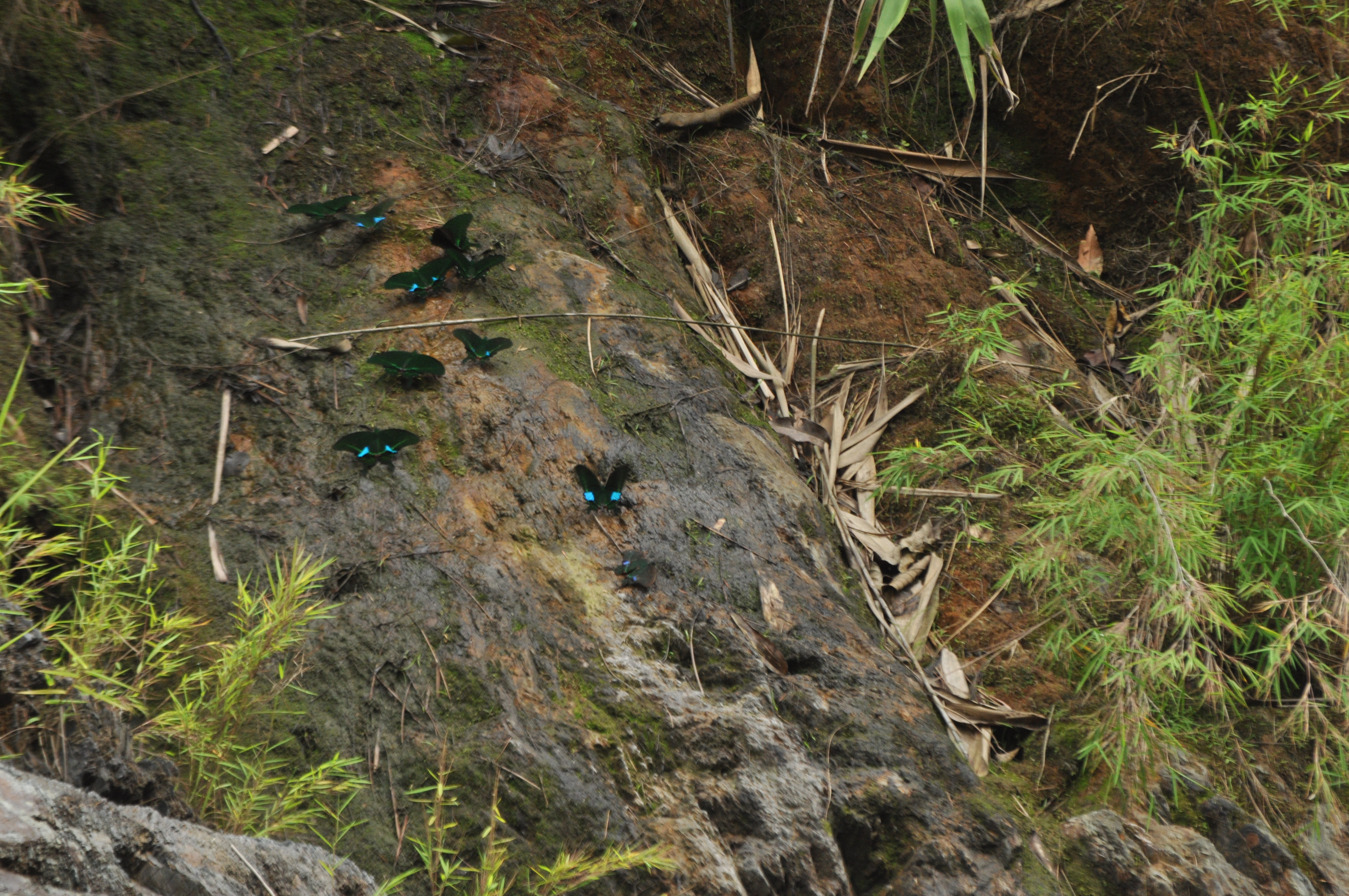
Mud-puddling in Buxa Tiger Reserve, West Bengal, India

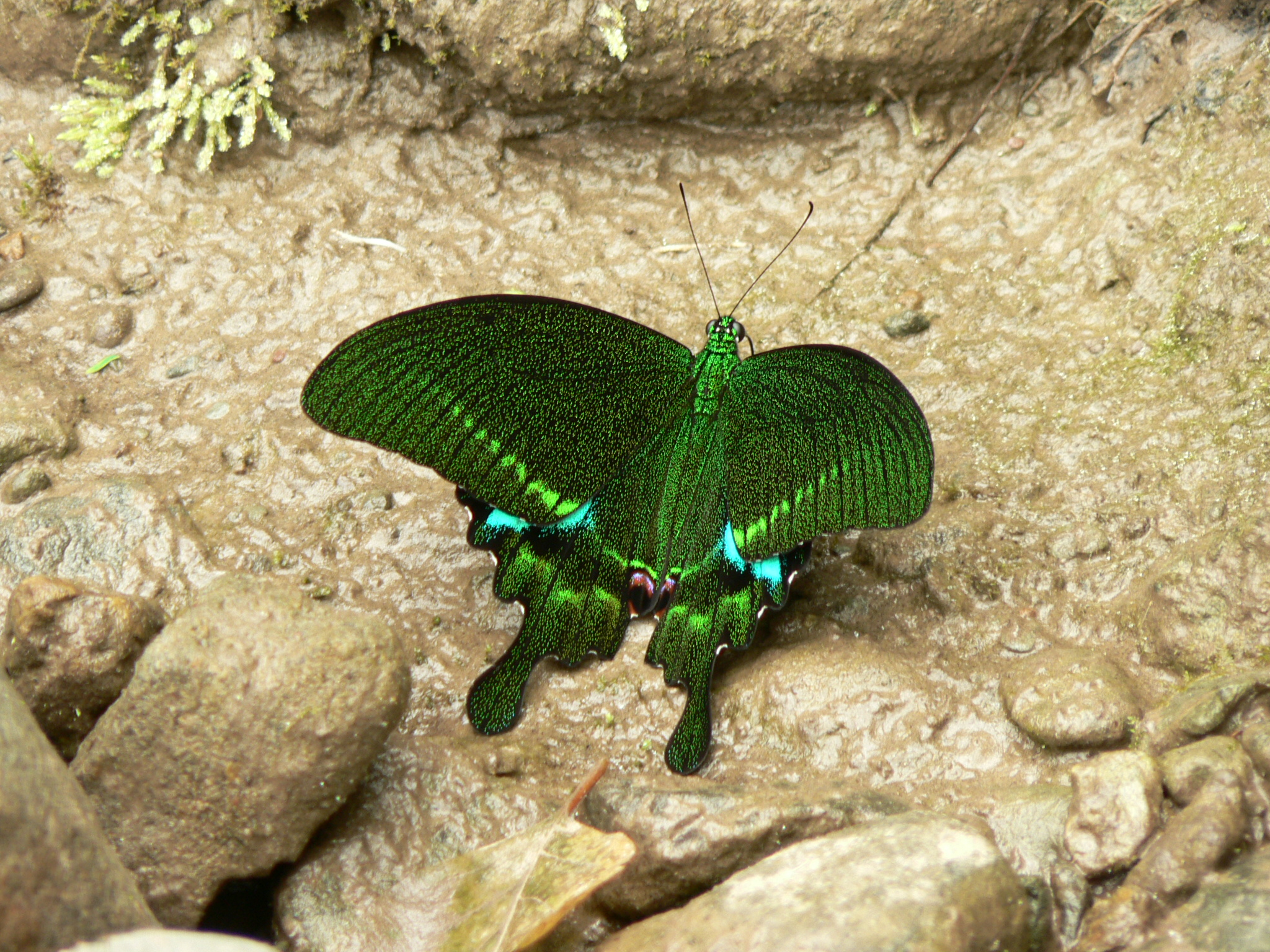
In Namdapha Tiger Reserve

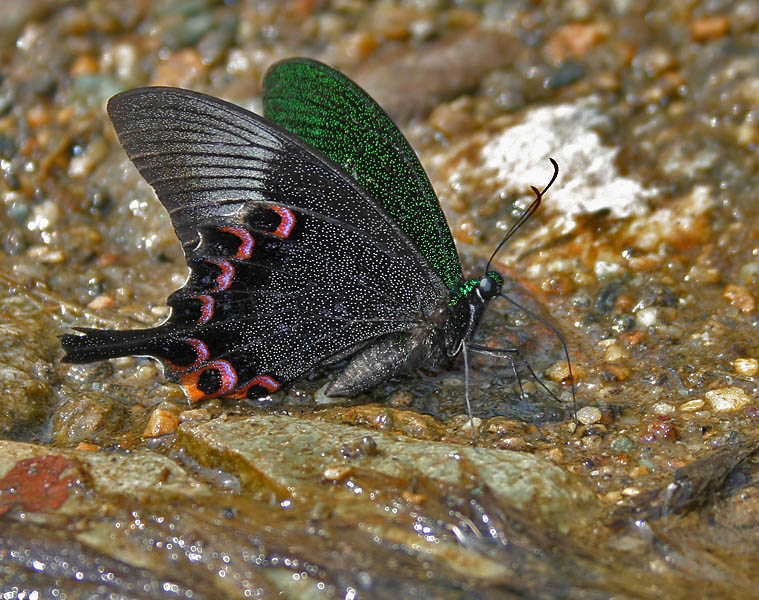
The underside of the wings

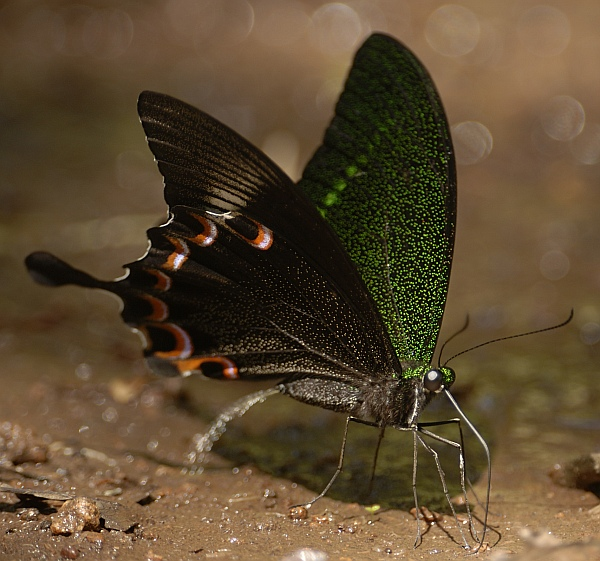
Mud-puddling in Thattekad, Kerala, India

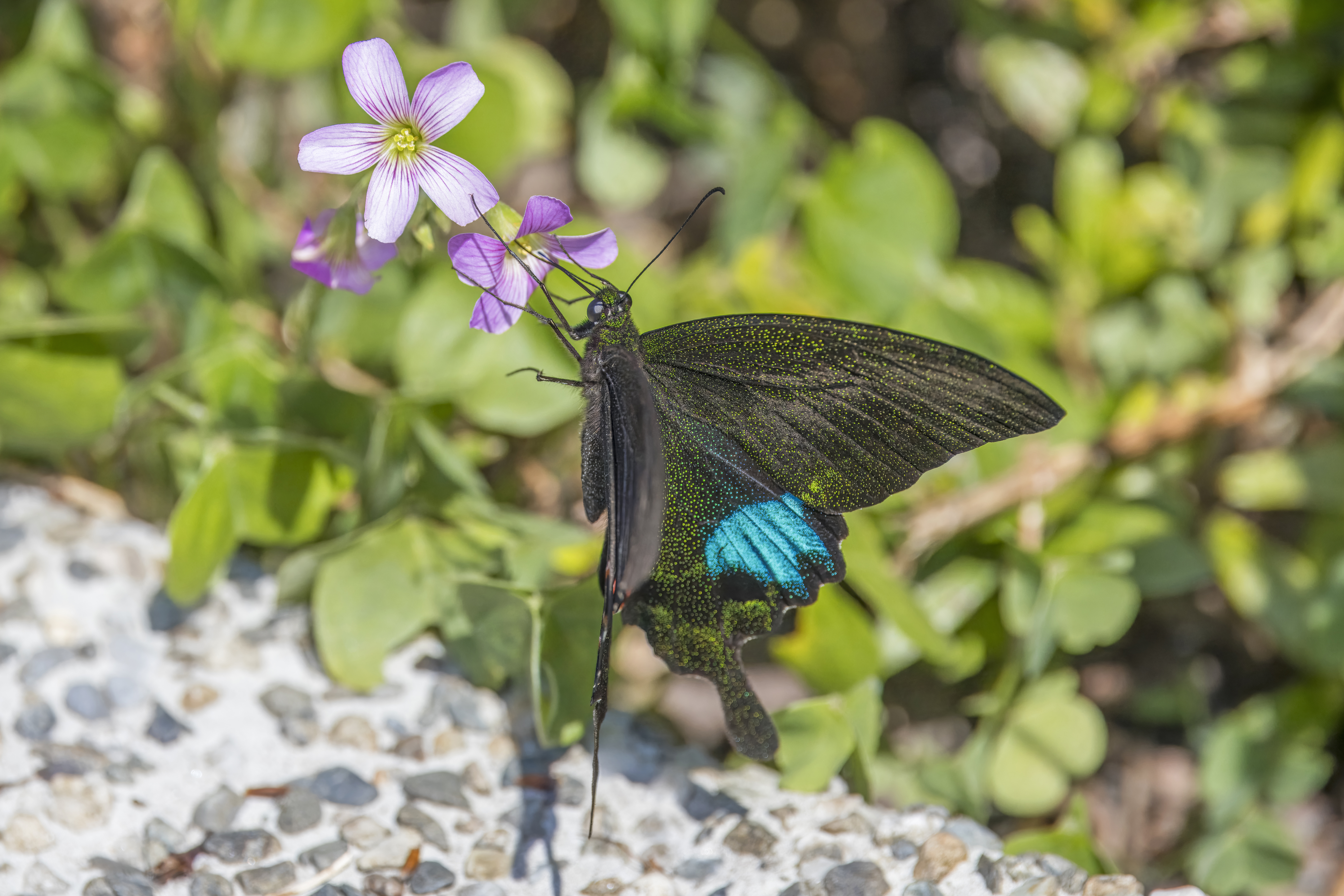
P. p. nakaharai on pink woodsorrel (Oxalis debilis)

== Taxonomy ==
The species group paris has the following members.

- Papilio arcturus Westwood, 1842 – blue peacock
- Papilio bianor Cramer, [1777] – Chinese peacock
- Papilio chikae Igarashi, 1965 – Luzon peacock swallowtail
- Papilio dialis Leech, 1893 – southern Chinese peacock
- Papilio doddsi Janet, 1896
- Papilio elephenor Doubleday, 1845 – yellow-crested spangle
- Papilio hoppo Matsumura, 1908
- Papilio karna C. Felder & R. Felder, 1864 - jungle jade
- Papilio krishna Moore, 1857 – Krishna peacock
- Papilio longimacula Z.G. Wang & Y. Niu, 2002
- Papilio maackii Ménétriés, 1859 – alpine black swallowtail
- Papilio paris Linnaeus, 1758 – Paris peacock
- Papilio polyctor Boisduval, 1836 – common peacock or Indian peacock

== See also ==
- Tamil peacock Papilio paris tamilana
- Papilionidae
- List of butterflies of India
- List of butterflies of India (Papilionidae)

== Other reading ==
- Erich Bauer and Thomas Frankenbach, 1998 Schmetterlinge der Erde, Butterflies of the World Part I (1), Papilionidae Papilionidae I: Papilio, Subgenus Achillides, Bhutanitis, Teinopalpus. Edited by Erich Bauer and Thomas Frankenbach. Keltern: Goecke & Evers; Canterbury: Hillside Books, ISBN 9783931374624
