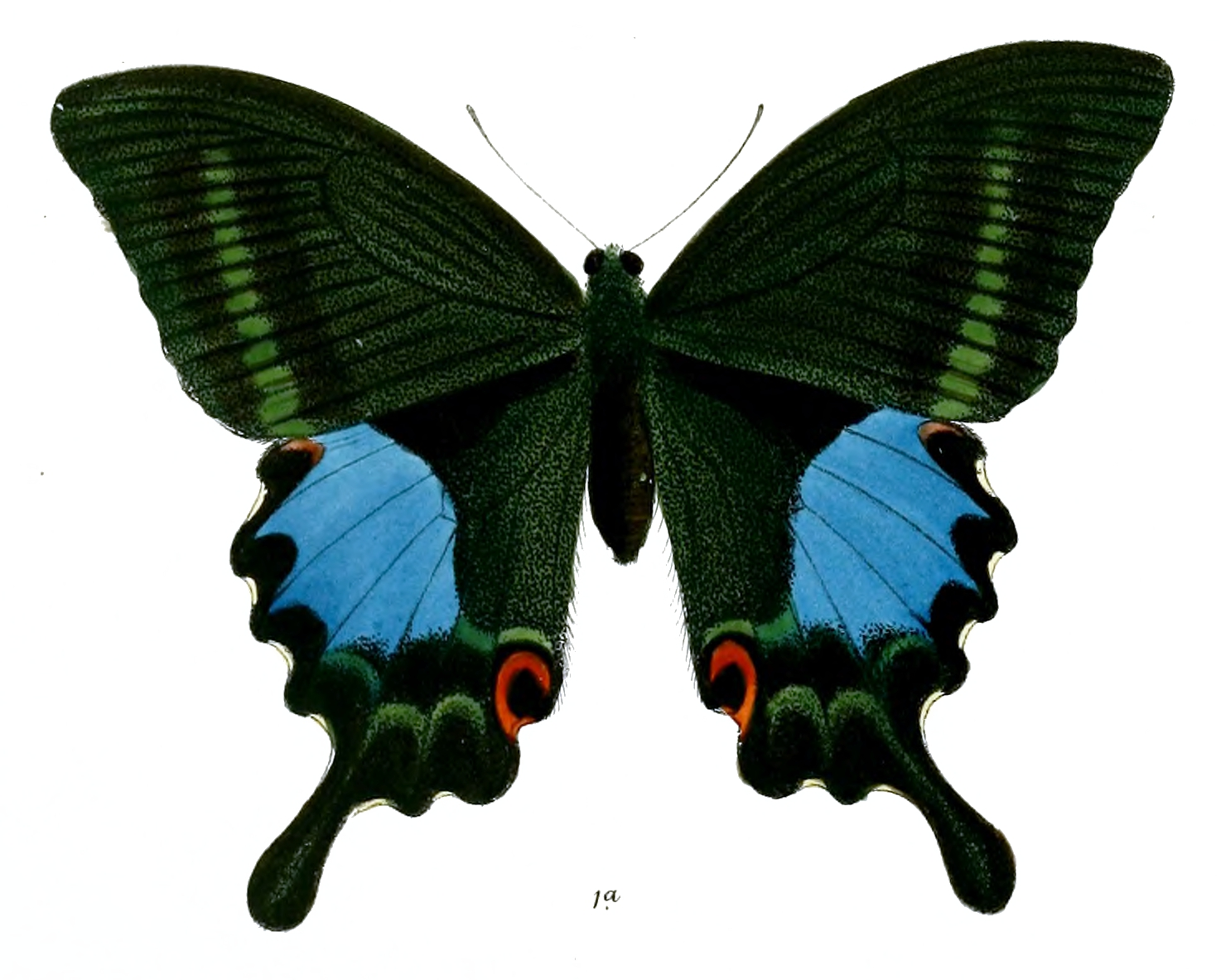
- Upperside

Scientific classification
- Kingdom: Animalia
- Phylum: Arthropoda
- Clade: Pancrustacea
- Class: Insecta
- Order: Lepidoptera
- Family: Papilionidae
- Genus: Papilio
- Species: P. paris
- Subspecies: P. p. tamilana

Trinomial name
- Papilio paris tamilana Moore, 1881

= Papilio paris tamilana =

Tamil peacock

Subspecies of butterfly

Papilio paris tamilana, the Tamil peacock, is an endemic swallowtail butterfly found in southern India. It is a subspecies of Papilio paris, the Paris peacock.

== Description ==
Papilio paris tamilana very closely resembles other subspecies of Papilio paris, but on the upperside the upper discal patch on the hindwing is of a paler more metallic blue and very considerably larger, it extends from interspace 3 well into interspace 7, from the apex of the cell into interspaces 3, 4, and 5, and from the middle of interspace 6 much further towards the termen than in typical P. paris. Underside similar to that of the typical form, but the transverse postdiscal pale band on the forewing is conspicuously narrower and curved inwards towards the costa. Antennae, head, thorax and abdomen as in typical P. paris.

Wingspan: 116–134 mm

Habitat: southern India, Kanara, Nilgiris, Travancore.

== Food plants ==
Erodia roxburghiana

== See also ==
- Papilionidae
- Papilio paris
- List of butterflies of India (Papilionidae)
