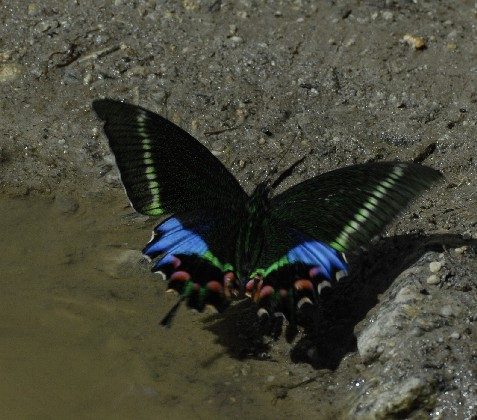

Scientific classification
- Kingdom: Animalia
- Phylum: Arthropoda
- Clade: Pancrustacea
- Class: Insecta
- Order: Lepidoptera
- Family: Papilionidae
- Genus: Papilio
- Species: P. krishna

Binomial name
- Papilio krishna Moore, 1857

= Papilio krishna =

Krishna peacock

Species of butterfly

Papilio krishna, the Krishna peacock, is a large swallowtail butterfly found in forests in China, Nepal, north east India, Myanmar and Vietnam.

== Description ==
- A large beautiful butterfly with a prominent swallowtail, the Krishna peacock has a wingspan of 120 to 130 mm (4.7 to 5.1 in)
- It has black upper forewings with a thin prominent yellow discal band running across the wing, parallel to the body.
- The upper hindwing has a large blue discal patch which tapers off into a greenish yellow band from its lower edges inwards towards the dorsum. It has a series of red-mauve capped crescents (usually five).
- The upper hindwing discal band appears on the under hindwing also as a prominent curved yellow discal band.

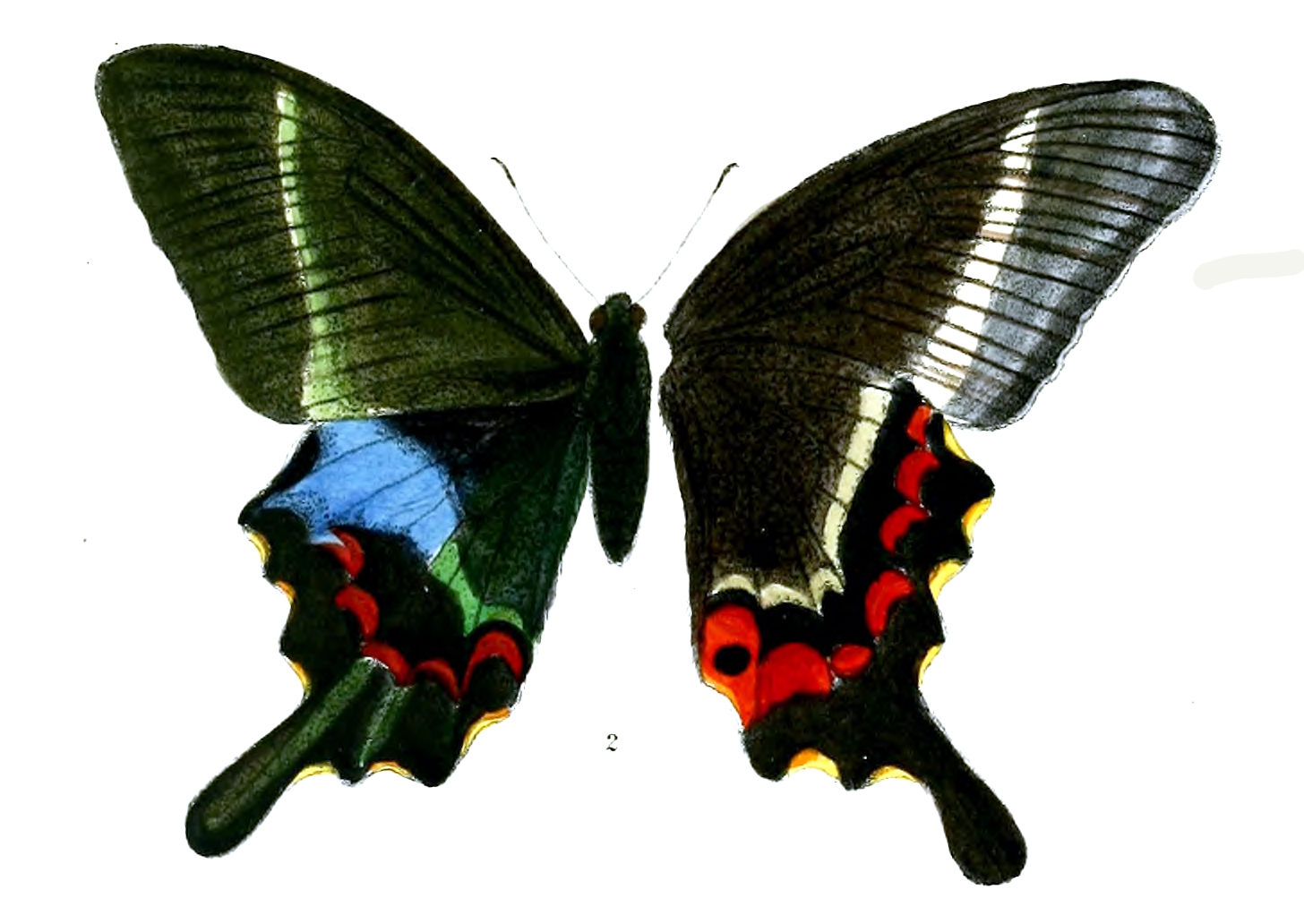
Male upper (left) and underside (right)

Resembles Papilio paris generally, but differs in many points as follows: Upperside: ground colour more of a brownish black, irrorated similarly to parti with, green scales, but the scales smaller and more sparsely spread. Forewing: the postdiscal transverse band well defined, complete, formed of white scaling with only a thin sprinkling of green scales on its inner margin, generally erect or slightly curved, rarely slightly sinuous. Hindwing: upper discal patch metallic greenish blue, smaller than in P. paris, but the portions of it in interspaces 6 and 7 more extended towards the termen, the metallic golden-green band that joins the patch on its inner side to the dorsal margin more conspicuous than in P. paris; the tornal ocellus as in P. paris, but above it a subterminal series of claret-red lunules in interspaces 2, 3, 4 and 5, followed by a series of ochraceous-red obscure terminal narrow lunules in the interspaces, the cilia on the outer margin of each conspicuously white. Underside: forewing as in P. paris but an erect ochraceous-white postdiscal band as on the upperside limits; the series of internervular pale streaks on the outer half of the wing. Hindwing: a well-defined discal ochraceous-white band formed of a series of somewhat lunular marks in the interspaces, these increase in width anteriorly; a subterminal series of claret-red lunules traversed by violet scaling on the inner side as in P. paris, but much broader and more prominent; finally a terminal series of ochraceous-yellow lunular marks in the interspaces; the cilia that border each lunule white. Antennae, head, thorax and abdomen as in P. paris.

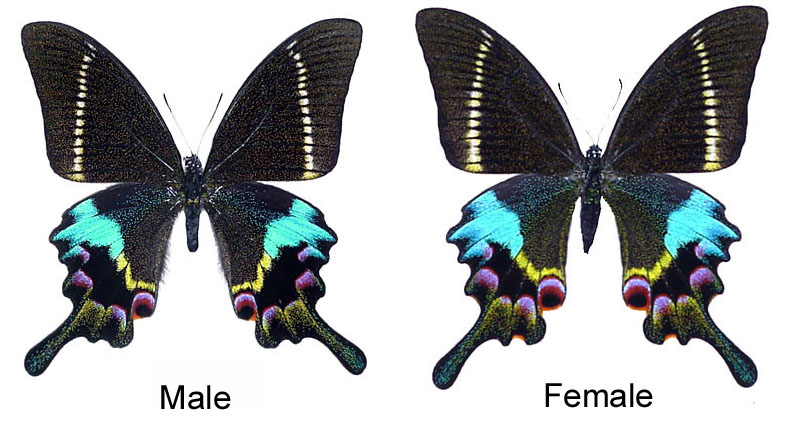
P. k. thawgawa, Chudu Razi Hills, north eastern Burma

== Range ==
Sikkim, Bhutan, Darjeeling, Nagaland, Manipur, Myanmar and all around the Himalayas.

== Subspecies ==
- Papilio krishna ssp. krishna (Indian, Bhutanese and Nepalese Himalayas)
- Papilio krishna ssp. manipuri (Manipur, India)
- Papilio krishna ssp. thawgawa (N. Myanmar and Yunnan)
- Papilio krishna ssp. charlesi (Sichuan)
- Papilio krishna ssp. mayumiae (N. Vietnam)

== Status ==
The IUCN Red Data Book records the status of the Krishna peacock as uncommon. It is not known to be threatened, though like all peacocks, it is highly sought in trade.

== Habitat ==
Generally found in the forests of the Himalayas where it flies from 3,000 to 9,000 feet (910 to 2,740 m).

== Food plants ==
The following food plants from family Rutaceae have been recorded:

- Evodia fraxinifolia
- Citrus species
- Zanthoxylum species

== Taxonomy ==
It is a member of the species group paris

== See also ==
- Papilionidae
- List of butterflies of India
- List of butterflies of India (Papilionidae)

== Other reading ==
- Erich Bauer and Thomas Frankenbach, 1998 Schmetterlinge der Erde, Butterflies of the World Part I (1), Papilionidae Papilionidae I: Papilio, Subgenus Achillides, Bhutanitis, Teinopalpus. Edited by Erich Bauer and Thomas Frankenbach. Keltern: Goecke & Evers; Canterbury: Hillside Books, ISBN 9783931374624
- Evans, W.H. (1932). The Identification of Indian Butterflies (2nd ed.). Mumbai, India: Bombay Natural History Society.
- Gaonkar, Harish (1996). Butterflies of the Western Ghats, India (including Sri Lanka) - A Biodiversity Assessment of a Threatened Mountain System. Bangalore, India: Centre for Ecological Sciences.
- Gay, Thomas; Kehimkar, Isaac David; Punetha, Jagdish Chandra (1992). Common Butterflies of India. Nature Guides. Bombay, India: World Wide Fund for Nature-India by Oxford University Press. ISBN 978-0195631647.
- Kunte, Krushnamegh (2000). Butterflies of Peninsular India. India, A Lifescape. Hyderabad, India: Universities Press. ISBN 978-8173713545.
- Wynter-Blyth, Mark Alexander (1957). Butterflies of the Indian Region. Bombay, India: Bombay Natural History Society. ISBN 978-8170192329.
