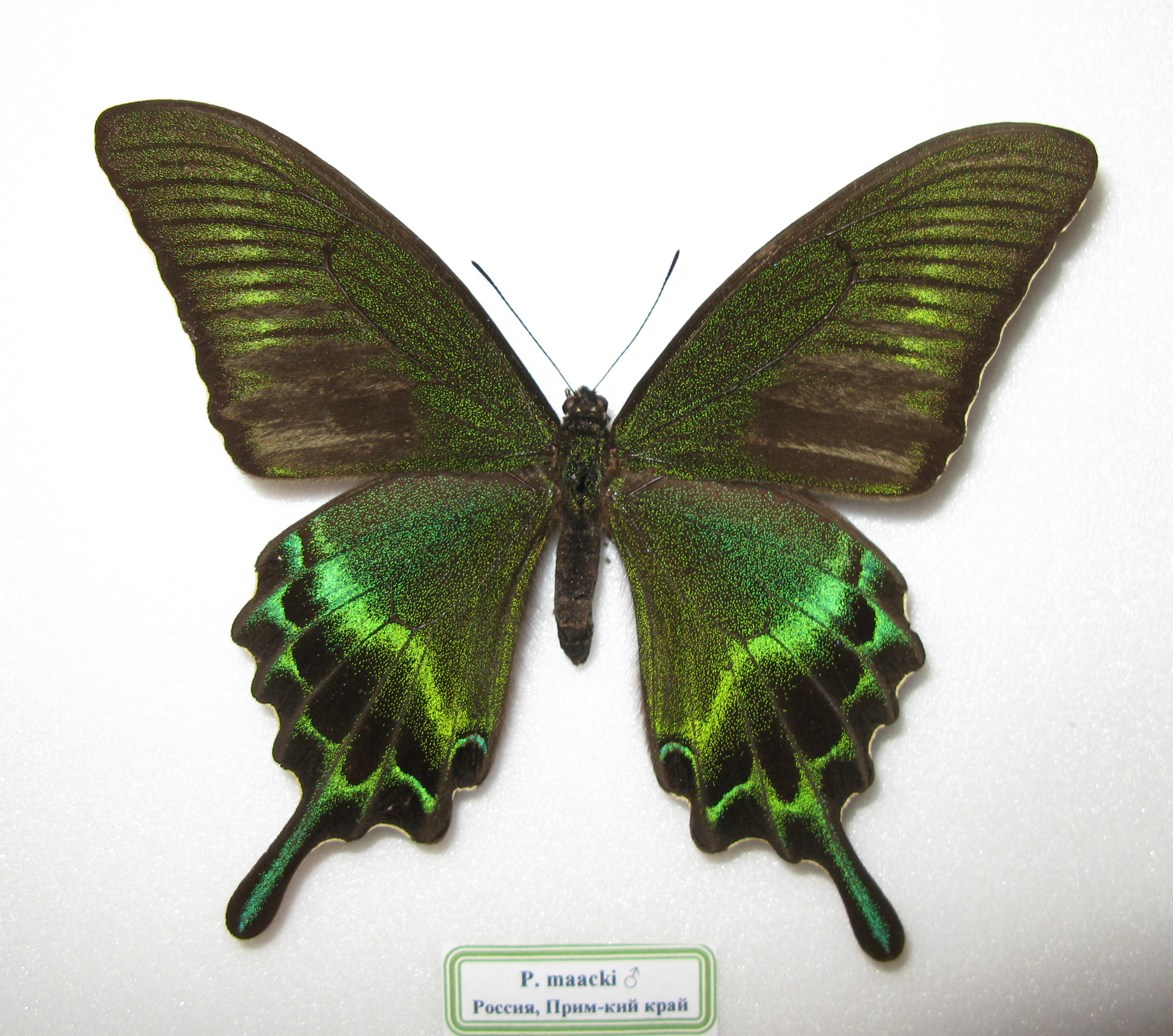

Scientific classification
- Kingdom: Animalia
- Phylum: Arthropoda
- Clade: Pancrustacea
- Class: Insecta
- Order: Lepidoptera
- Family: Papilionidae
- Genus: Papilio
- Species: P. maackii

Binomial name
- Papilio maackii Ménétries, 1859

= Papilio maackii =

Species of butterfly

Papilio maackii, the alpine black swallowtail is a butterfly of the family Papilionidae. It is found in Central Asia, Russia, Japan, China, and South Korea, with presumable populations in North Korea.

The larvae feed on Zanthoxylum ailanthoides, Euodia meliaefolia, Orixa japonica and Phellodendron amurense.

== Anatomy and morphology ==
The wingspan ranges from 12-14cm (5-6 in). The body of P. maackii is black and dotted with some green scales. The forewings of males are black and speckled with many green scales. The underside of the wings are brown. The hind wings are black and speckled with blue and purple scales and have a tail. There is an eyespot on the side closest to the body. The undersides of the hind wings are a darker brown and lined with red or orange spots. Females are more brightly colored and vibrant than males with red and blue spots behind the green band that runs across both wings.

== Habitat ==
The Alpine Swallowtail lives along the forest edges of grasslands where there are plentiful bushes. They typically lay their eggs on prickly ash and cork oak leaves.

== Taxonomy ==
It is a member of the species group paris.

== Other reading ==
- Media related to Papilio maackii at Wikimedia Commons
- Data related to Papilio maackii at Wikispecies
- Erich Bauer and Thomas Frankenbach, 1998 Schmetterlinge der Erde, Butterflies of the World Part I (1), Papilionidae Papilionidae I: Papilio, Subgenus Achillides, Bhutanitis, Teinopalpus. Edited by Erich Bauer and Thomas Frankenbach. Keltern: Goecke & Evers; Canterbury: Hillside Books, ISBN 978-3-931374-62-4
