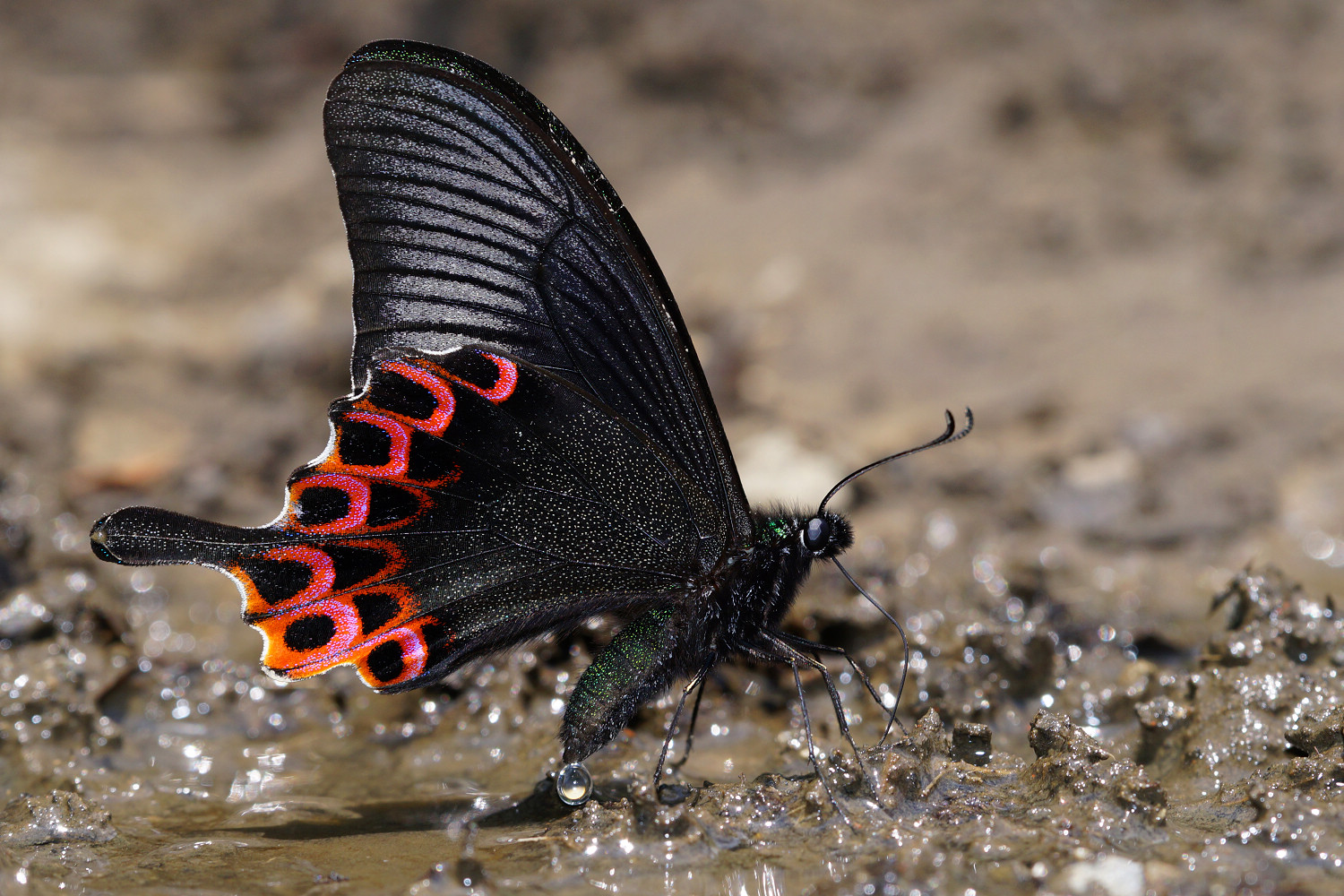

Scientific classification
- Kingdom: Animalia
- Phylum: Arthropoda
- Clade: Pancrustacea
- Class: Insecta
- Order: Lepidoptera
- Family: Papilionidae
- Genus: Papilio
- Species: P. hoppo

Binomial name
- Papilio hoppo Matsumura, 1907

Synonyms
- Papilio hopponis Matsumura, 1907

= Papilio hoppo =

Species of butterfly

Papilio hoppo is a species of swallowtail butterfly. It is found only in Taiwan.

== Description ==
The imago has a wingspan of between 75 and 85 mm[1]. On the obverse, the wings are black and dotted with green scales. The forewings have a faint green band, the hindwings are extended by tails and bear blue macules, pink lunulae and pink ocelli in the anal part. On the reverse side the wings are dark grey, the forewings are partly light grey while the hindwings have two rows of pink lunulae. The body is black and sprinkled with green scales on top.

== Biology ==
The larvae feed on Citrus species.

== Taxonomy ==
It is a member of the species group paris

== Other sources ==
- Erich Bauer and Thomas Frankenbach, 1998 Schmetterlinge der Erde, Butterflies of the world Part I (1), Papilionidae Papilionidae I: Papilio, Subgenus Achillides, Bhutanitis, Teinopalpus. Edited by Erich Bauer and Thomas Frankenbach. Keltern : Goecke & Evers; Canterbury : Hillside Books ISBN 9783931374624 plate 3, figure 4
