= Spangles (sweets) =

Confectionery brand (discontinued)

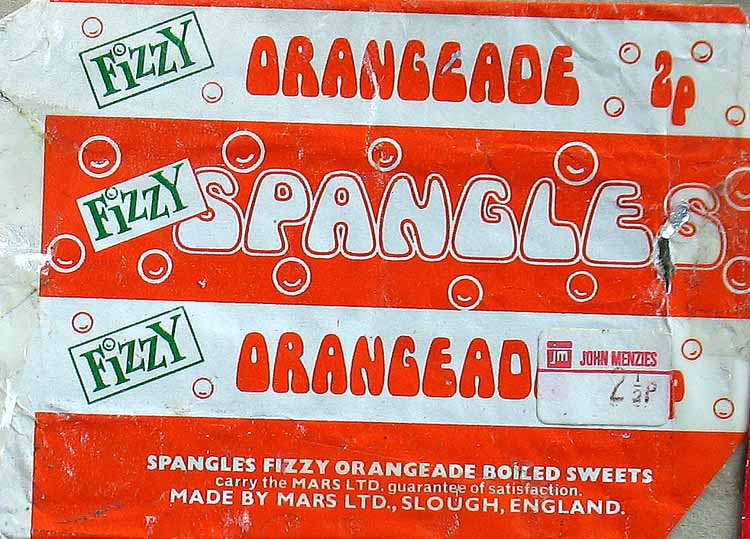
Fizzy Orangeade Spangles wrapper from 1974, price 2½ pence

Spangles was a brand of boiled sweets manufactured by Mars in the United Kingdom from 1950 to the early 1980s. They were sold in a paper packet with individual sweets originally unwrapped but later cellophane wrapped. They were distinguished by their shape which was a rounded square with a circular depression on each face.

== History ==
When Spangles were introduced in 1950, sweets were still on ration, and the price of sweets had to be accompanied by tokens or points from one's ration book, but Spangles required only one point instead of the two required for other sweets and chocolate. This bonus, accompanied by effective marketing, made Spangles even more popular. American actor William Boyd was chosen to front the advertising campaign as a character he made famous in numerous films, Hopalong Cassidy, along with the slogan "Hoppy's favourite sweet". Another slogan was "The sweet way to go gay!"

During the early 1970s Mars commissioned a redesign of the packaging using a ‘funky’ period appropriate bespoke typeface. The new typeface and packaging designs were created by Neville Uden.

Spangles were discontinued in 1984, and briefly reintroduced in 1995, including in Woolworths outlets in the UK, though only four varieties were available – tangerine, lime, blackcurrant and Old English. There are many nostalgic references to them from children who grew up with them. Spangles are associated with the post-war era and they, like Space Hoppers or the Raleigh Chopper, have become shorthand for lazy nostalgia for the time, as in the phrase "Do you remember Spangles?" In 2008, Spangles topped a poll of discontinued brands which British consumers would most like to see revived.

The Tunes brand was the last remaining relation of the Spangles brand, sharing the shape and wrapping of the original product, but it has also now been discontinued.

== Varieties ==
The regular Spangles packet (labelled simply "Spangles") contained a variety of translucent, fruit-flavoured sweets: strawberry, blackcurrant, orange, pineapple, lemon and lime, and cola. Originally the sweets were not individually wrapped, but later a waxed paper, and eventually a cellophane wrapper was used. The tube was striped, a bright orange-red colour alternating with silver. It bore the word "Spangles" in large letters. In the 1970s a distinctive, seventies-style font was used.

Over the production period many different single-flavour varieties were introduced including Acid Drop, Barley Sugar, Blackcurrant, Liquorice, Peppermint, Spearmint and Tangerine. A white mint Spangle, complete with hole, was produced as a competitor to the Polo mint.

=== Old English Spangles ===
The Old English Spangles packet contained "traditional English" flavours. The standard line-up was liquorice (black), mint humbug (brown), pear drop (orange/red), aniseed (green) and treacle (opaque mustard yellow), but other flavours appeared from time to time.

The sweets' individual wrappers were striped, distinguishing them from regular Spangles. The tube was black, white and purple, and designed for a more mature and sophisticated clientele than the regular variety.

=== Mystery Spangles ===
A 1964 marketing campaign involved a Mystery Flavour Contest in which packets of 'Five Fruit Flavour' Spangles contained a flavour with question marks on the internal wrapper. Press advertisements invited consumers to guess the fruit blend flavour from a list of six possibilities to win a transistor radio. After the competition closed in September the flavour was revealed as Fruit Cocktail.

== In popular culture ==
Spangles were mentioned in The Kinks' song "Art Lover", from their 1981 album, Give the People What They Want. In 1977, the British novelty pop band Lieutenant Pigeon released an instrumental single titled "Spangles". The Fall song "It's A Curse" on their album The Infotainment Scan, also includes a reference to Spangles.

== See also ==
- List of confectionery brands
