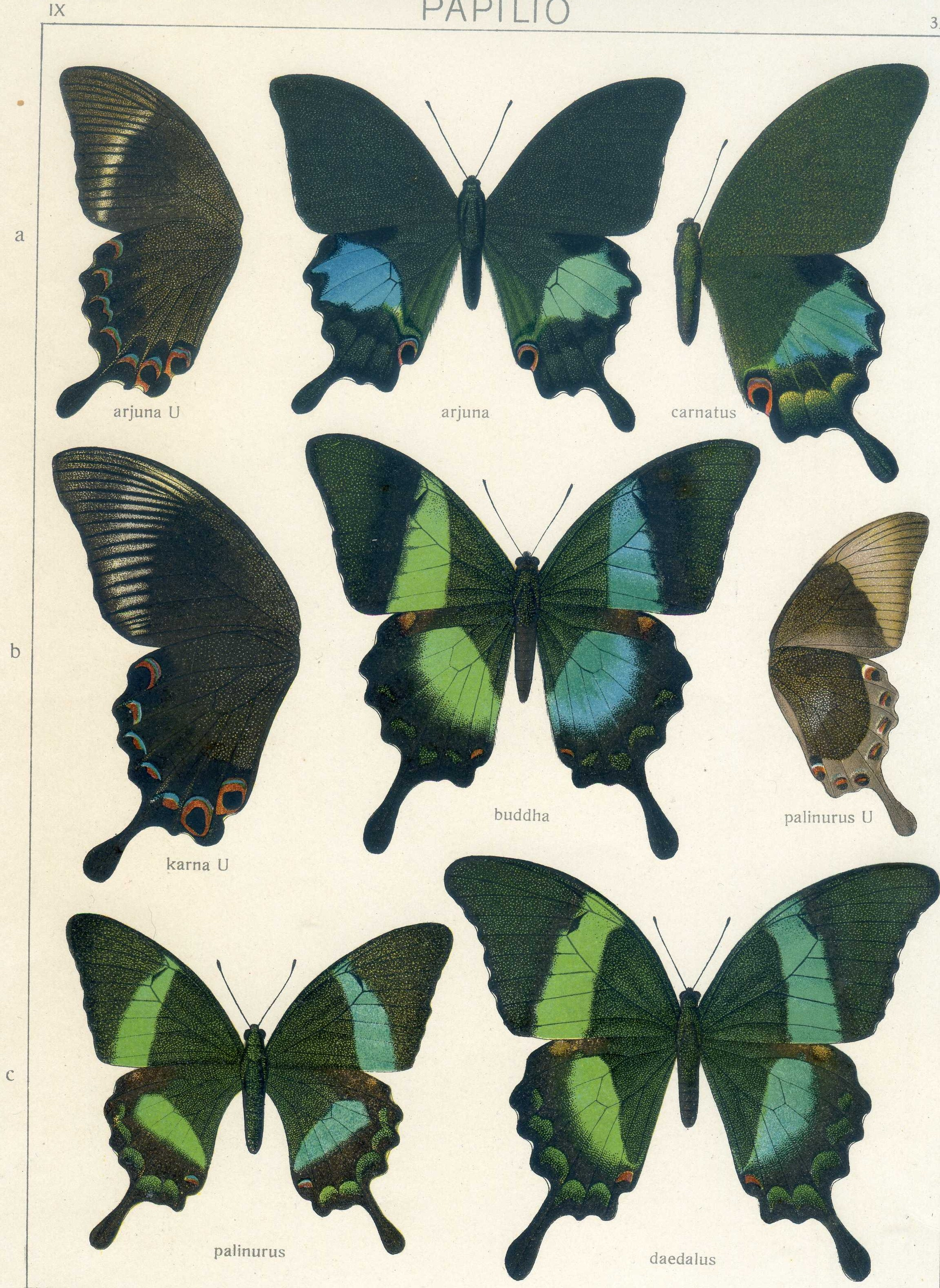
- Papilio karna far right on upper row (dorsal surface) and far left on middle row (ventral surface); remaining are P. paris, P. buddha and P. palinurus

Scientific classification
- Kingdom: Animalia
- Phylum: Arthropoda
- Clade: Pancrustacea
- Class: Insecta
- Order: Lepidoptera
- Family: Papilionidae
- Genus: Papilio
- Species: P. karna

Binomial name
- Papilio karna C. & R. Felder, 1864

Synonyms
- Papilio discordia de Nicéville, [1893]

= Papilio karna =

Species of butterfly

Papilio karna the jungle jade is a species of swallowtail butterfly from the genus Papilio that is found in Java, Sumatra, Borneo and the Philippines.

== Description ==
P. karna. Larger than the Malayan forms of the preceding species [ Papilio paris]. The forewing, so far as is known, at most with a slight indication of a green band before the hindmargin; the metallic area of the hindwing nearly always separated from the cell, posteriorly broader than in the paris-forms and hence even more band-like than in P. parts gedeensis, the red anal ring very large, the grey scaling before the distal margin condensed into more distinct submarginal patches than in P. paris. The submarginal spots on the under surface of the hindwing reddish yellow, the 3 central ones reduced, the purple arcs large, the yellowish grey dusting of both wings less extended.In the female the upper surface of the hindwing bears a yellow submarginal spot behind the costal vein. The earlier stages not known. The butterfly on Java, Sumatra and Borneo; much rarer than the paris-forms. This species stands in the same relationship to P. paris as P. iswara to P. helenus. — karna Fldr. (35 b) is the smallest of the three known geographical forms; it flies in West Java, in the same districts as P. paris gedeensis. — discordia Nicev. (= discoidea Nicev.) is larger than karna and the central reddish yellow submarginal spots on the underside of the hindwing are smaller. North-East Sumatra, in the Gajo highlands. — carnatus Rothsch. (= karnata Fruhst.) (35 a), from North Borneo, appears to be much less rare than the preceding forms and occurs also in the plains. Mostly as large as discordia, but many specimens not larger than karna; the inner margin of the metallic area between the subcostal and the 1. radial very oblique, the yellowish green submarginal spots very large, the reddish yellow submarginal spots on the underside of the hindwing reduced, the 5. nearly always absent.

== Subspecies ==
- Papilio karna karna (western Java: Mount Gede)
- Papilio karna discordia de Nicéville, [1893] (north-eastern Sumatra)
- Papilio karna carnatus Rothschild, 1895 (northern Borneo)
- Papilio karna irauana Jumalon, 1975 (Philippines: Palawan)

== Taxonomy ==
It is a member of the species group paris

== Other sources ==
- Erich Bauer and Thomas Frankenbach, 1998 Schmetterlinge der Erde, Butterflies of the world Part I (1), Papilionidae Papilionidae I: Papilio, Subgenus Achillides, Bhutanitis, Teinopalpus. Edited by Erich Bauer and Thomas Frankenbach. Keltern : Goecke & Evers; Canterbury : Hillside Books ISBN 9783931374624
