= Spong =

Spong is a surname in multiple Germanic-speaking cultures. In England, it is an archaic term for a narrow strip of land. Notable people with this name include:

- Catherine Y. Spong, American physician and researcher
- Gerard Spong (born 1946), Dutch lawyer of Surinamese descent
- Hilda Spong (1875–1955), English actress
- Jack Spong (footballer) (born 2002), English footballer
- James Osborn Spong (1839–1925), founder of Spong and Co., kitchen equipment manufacturers
- John Shelby Spong (1931–2021), American Episcopal bishop
- Laura Spong (1926–2018), American painter
- Mark W. Spong (born 1952), American roboticist
- Paul Spong (born 1939), Canadian cetologist and neuroscientist
- Richard Spong (born 1983), Swedish footballer
- Roger Spong (1906–1980), England rugby union footballer
- Rohan Spong (born 1981), Australian documentary film director
- Sriwhana Spong (born 1979), New Zealand artist and dancer
- Tyrone Spong (born 1985), Surinamese martial artist
- Walter Brookes Spong (1851–1929), English painter
- William Spong Jr. (1920-1997), American politician from Virginia

== See also ==
- Dora Beedham née Spong (1879–1969), British nurse and suffragette
- Spong Hill, Early Saxon cemetery in Norfolk, England
- Spongmonkey, fictional creature and Internet phenomenon
- Sponge (disambiguation)
