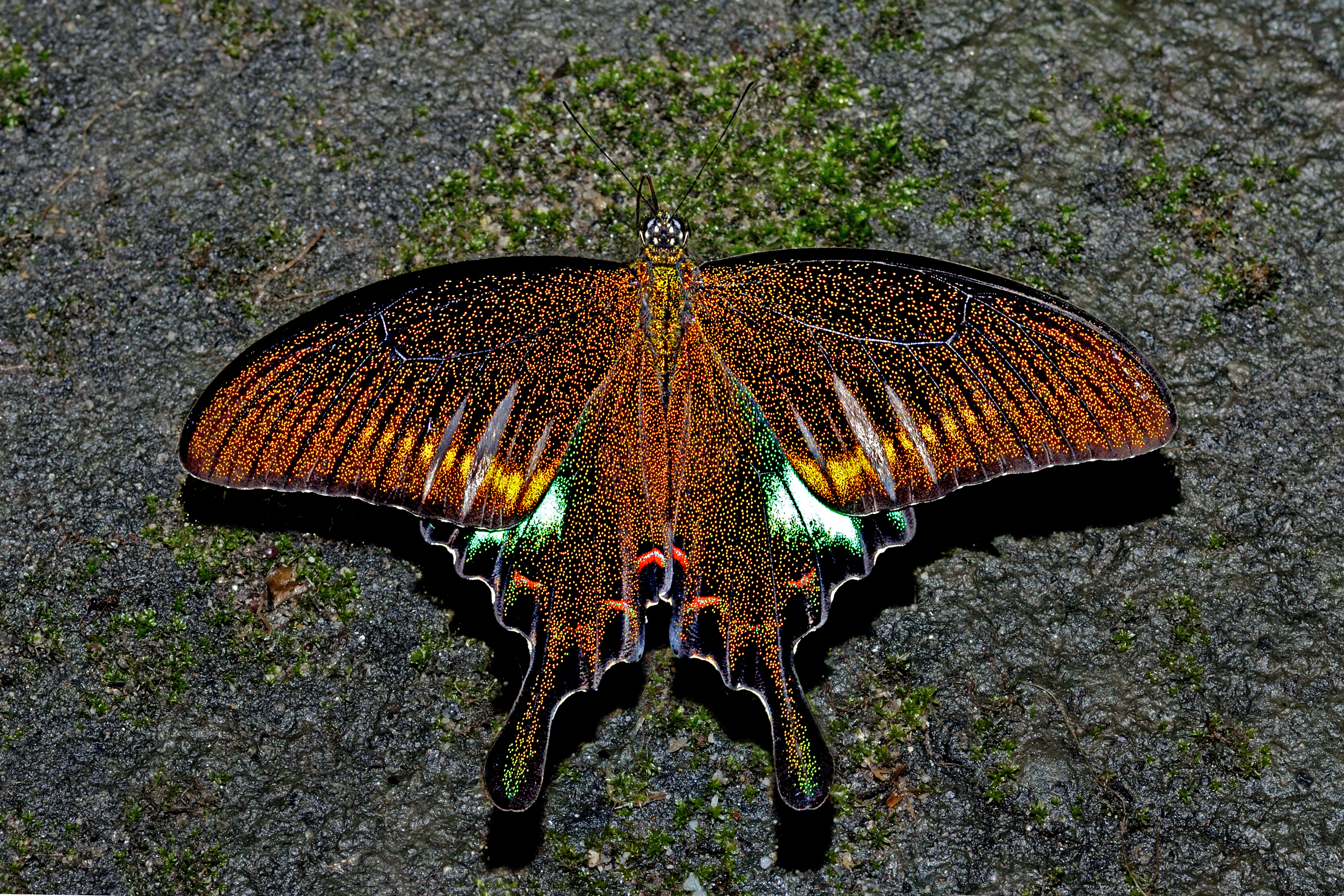
- Dorsal view

Scientific classification
- Kingdom: Animalia
- Phylum: Arthropoda
- Clade: Pancrustacea
- Class: Insecta
- Order: Lepidoptera
- Family: Papilionidae
- Genus: Papilio
- Species: P. bianor

Binomial name
- Papilio bianor Cramer, 1777

Synonyms
- Papilio polyctor

= Papilio bianor =

Species of butterfly

Papilio bianor, also known as the common peacock, is a species of butterfly in the family Papilionidae, the swallowtails. It is native to Continental Asia. It is the state butterfly of the Indian state of Uttarakhand.

== Description ==
This species is variable in size. Individuals emerged in the spring reach 4 to 8 centimeters wide, while those emerged in the summer can reach 12 centimeters. The forewings are black with dark veining and green scales. The undersides are brown, turning white distally with dark veining. The hindwings are tailed and have ridged edges containing reddish eyespots. The body is black with green scales.

The male has black hair on the forewings, which the female lacks.

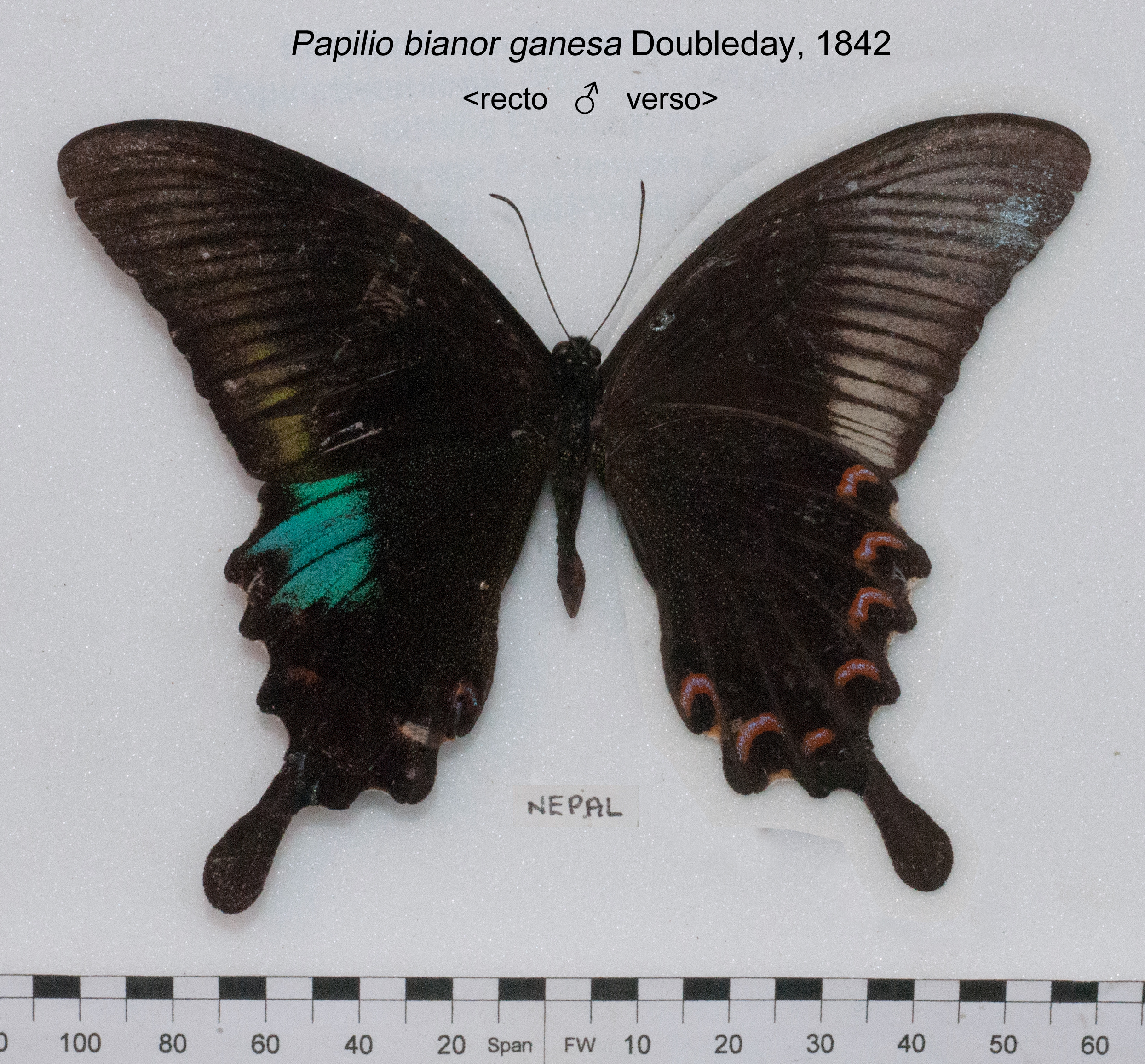
e:Papilio bianor ganesa male

== Description in Seitz ==
. P. bianor. Geographically as well as seasonally very variable. male: the pilose stripes broad, the posterior three usually united, when they are separated the stripe of the lower median remains broader than the interspace, which separates it from the stripe of the submedian fold; upper surface of the forewing dusted with green or greenblue, this scaling commonly condensed into a band before the narrowly dark distal margin; upper surface of the hindwing anteriorly blue or blue-green and posteriorly dusted with green, commonly with a more thickly scaled large green or blue patch (or a similar band), a red anal spot, besides 0—4 red submarginal spots and at least anteriorly some distinct green submarginal spots. The black basal area of the forewing beneath always extends beyond the base of the upper median, sometimes the whole wing is black; under surface of the hindwing with a complete row of red submarginal spots. The female with less dense metallic scaling; the red spots on the upperside of the hindwing usually more numerous and larger than in the male. The butterfly occurs from North Japan to Tonkin and West China and appears to be fairly common in all its localities, sometimes occurring in profusion. Like the allied species the males congregate on moist sand and visit flowers. The larva is green with 2—8 light oblique bands, on Aurantiaceae.Karl Jordan in Seitz.

== Subspecies ==
There are many subspecies.

- P. b. okinawensis (Yaeyama islands, Okinawa, Japan)
- P. b. ryukyuensis (Okinawa islands, Japan)
- P. b. amamiensis (Amami islands, Kagoshima, Japan)
- P. b. tokaraensis (Tokara islands, Kagoshima, Japan)
- P. b. hachijonis (Hachijo island, Izu islands, Japan)
- P. b. kotoensis Sonan, 1927 (Taiwan)
- P. b. thrasymedes Fruhstorfer 1909 (Taiwan)
- P. b. polyctor Boisduval, 1836
- P. b. ganesa Doubleday, 1842 (Sikkim, Assam, N.Vietnam, Yunnan) Forewing usually with green discal band, which in specimens from Assam is often only very weakly indicated, but sometimes is broader than in many Sikkim examples. Hindwing with blue patch, which reaches to the 3. radial and is more or less strongly produced distad behind the subcostal and 1. radial.
- P. b. gladiator Fruhstorfer, 1902 unicolorous blue costal area on the upper surface of the hindwing predominates.

== Biology ==
This species can be found in forests and other wooded areas. It can occur in suburban and urban areas if appropriate host plants are available.

Food plants include species of citrus, prickly ash, cork trees, trifoliate orange, rue, and Japanese skimmia.

Using the species as a model to investigate the iridescent colour evolution, phylogeography, and the evolution of swallowtail butterflies a chromosome scale genome has been sequenced, the final assembly being 421.52 Mb in size, with 15,375 protein-coding genes and 30 chromosomes (29 autosomes and 1 Z sex chromosome). Phylogenetic analysis of this data indicating that P. bianor separated from a common ancestor of swallowtails ~23.69–36.04 million years ago.

== Taxonomy ==
It is a member of the species group paris.
