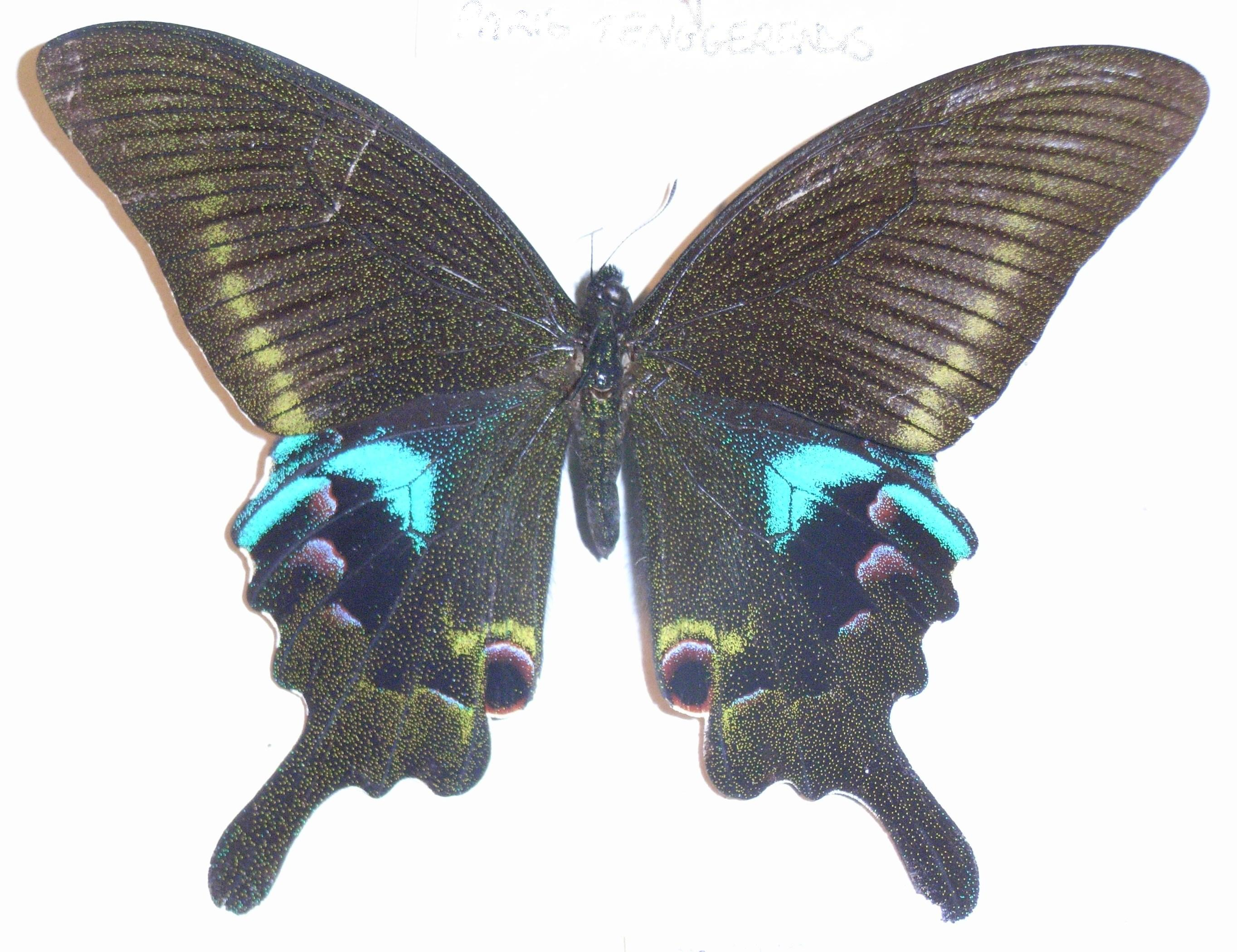

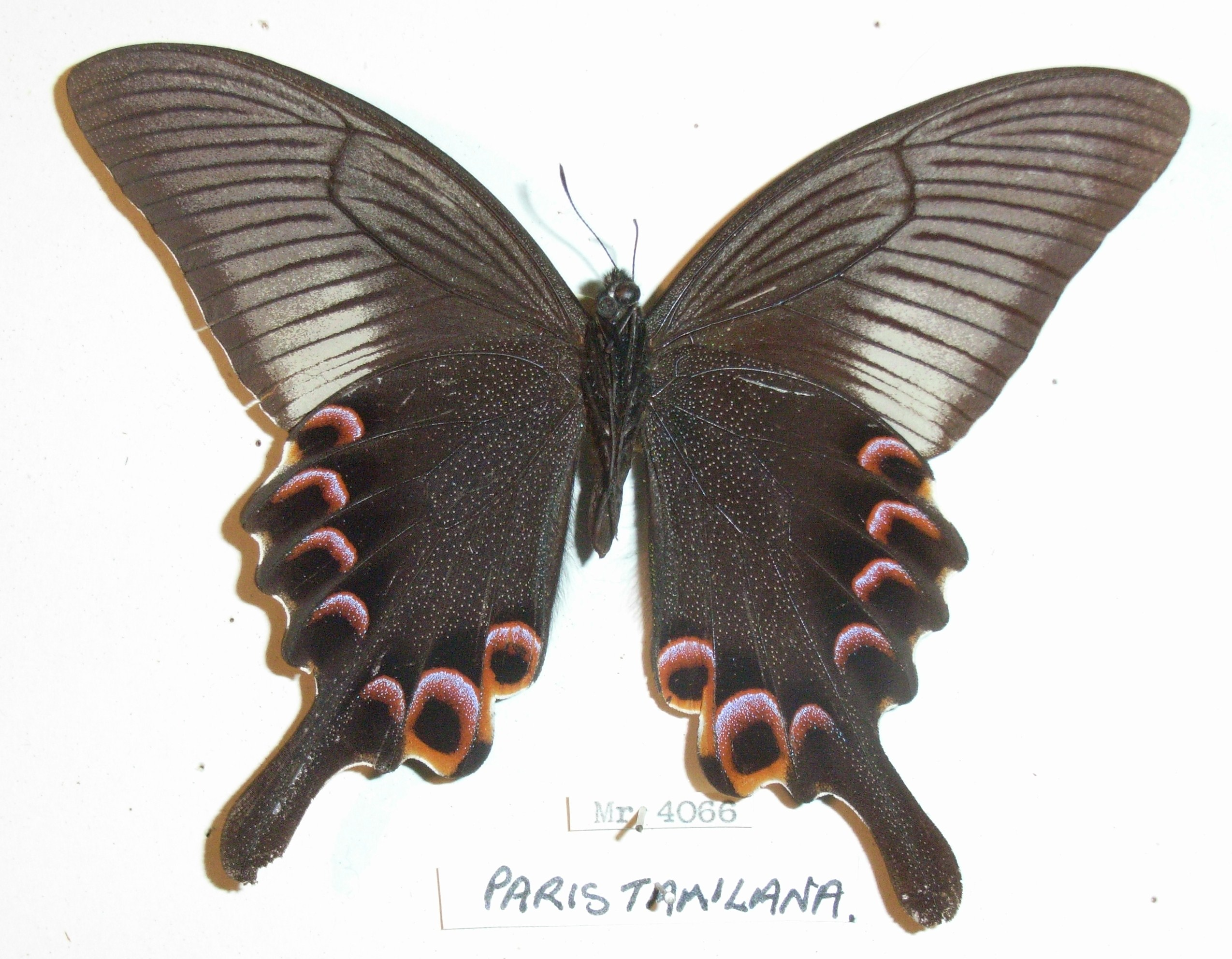
- Male upperside / underside (label wrong)

Scientific classification
- Kingdom: Animalia
- Phylum: Arthropoda
- Class: Insecta
- Order: Lepidoptera
- Family: Papilionidae
- Genus: Papilio
- Species: P. arcturus

Binomial name
- Papilio arcturus Westwood, 1842

Synonyms
- Princeps arcturus

= Papilio arcturus =

Blue peacock

Species of butterfly

Papilio arcturus, the blue peacock, is a species of swallowtail butterfly found in the Indian subcontinent.

== Description ==
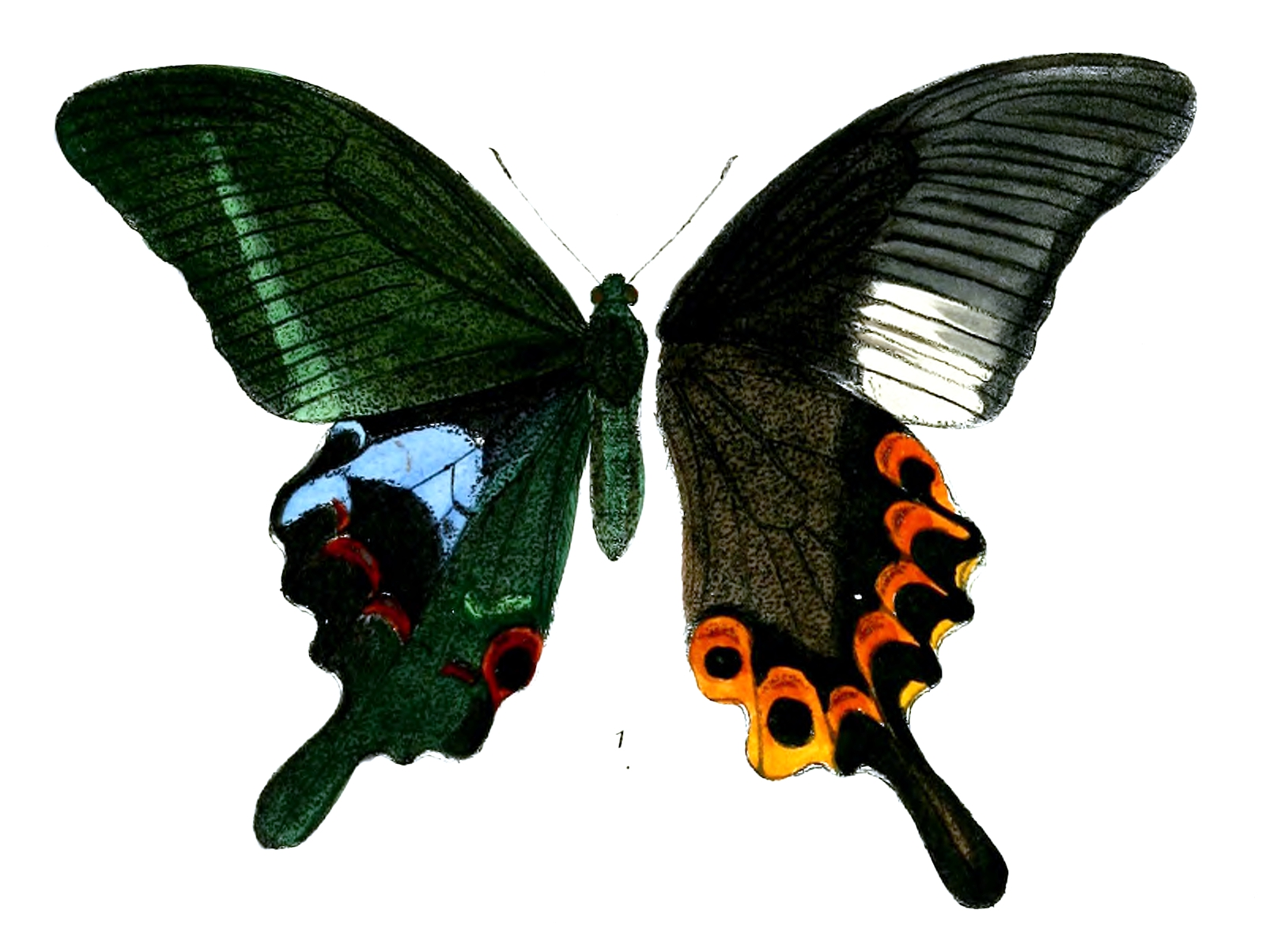
Male upperside (left half) and underside (right half)

Male has the upper wings brownish black, somewhat paler on the forewing than on the hindwing. Forewing irrorated (sprinkled) with brilliant golden-green scales that on the posterior half of the wing form a broad, not well-defined subterminal band; the veins and elongate streaks between them on the outer half of the wing velvety black. Hindwing has the posterior three-fourths irrorated with brilliant golden-green scales as on the forewing but towards the base anteriorly these are blue; a conspicuous brilliant blue patch somewhat irregular in shape occupies the apex of the cell and the bases of interspaces 5 and 6, prolonged as a broad streak in the latter interspace up to the terminal margin; below this a more or less triangular patch on the disc and above it the whole of the costal margin broadly are devoid of the irroration of green scales; a subterminal generally incomplete series of large claret-red lunules terminates at the tornal angle in a large conspicuous black-centred red ocellus; the latter is encircled above and anteriorly by a narrow band formed by a conflux of the green irrorated scales; the lunules are bordered outwardly by spots of the ground colour that are devoid of the green scales; finally both the lunules and the tornal ocellus are tinged more or less with bluish purple on their inner margins, underside dull black, with a somewhat sparse irroration of yellowish-white scales confined on the forewing to the base and apex, and on the hindwing to the posterior two-thirds, not extended to the termen except along the tail. Forewing: a broad ill-defined subterminal pale transverse area, crossed by the black veins and internervular streaks, and elongated pale cellular streaks. Hindwing: a large somewhat quadrate terminal black-centred claret-red patch in interspaces 1 and 2, and a subterminal series of broad claret-red lunules that extends from interspaces 3 to 7, followed by ill-defined anteciliary red spots in each interspace. Cilia of both forewings and hindwings white, alternated with black. Antennae, head, thorax and abdomen brownish black; the head, thorax and abdomen at base on the upperside sprinkled with golden-green scales.

The female is similar to the male but the markings are more prominent. Upperside of forewing has the subterminal golden-green band broader and on the hindwing the subterminal series of claret-red lunules more complete than in the male.

== Taxonomy ==
It is a member of the species group paris

== Other sources ==
- Erich Bauer and Thomas Frankenbach, 1998 Schmetterlinge der Erde, Butterflies of the world Part I (1), Papilionidae Papilionidae I: Papilio, Subgenus Achillides, Bhutanitis, Teinopalpus. Edited by Erich Bauer and Thomas Frankenbach. Keltern: Goecke & Evers; Canterbury: Hillside Books ISBN 9783931374624
