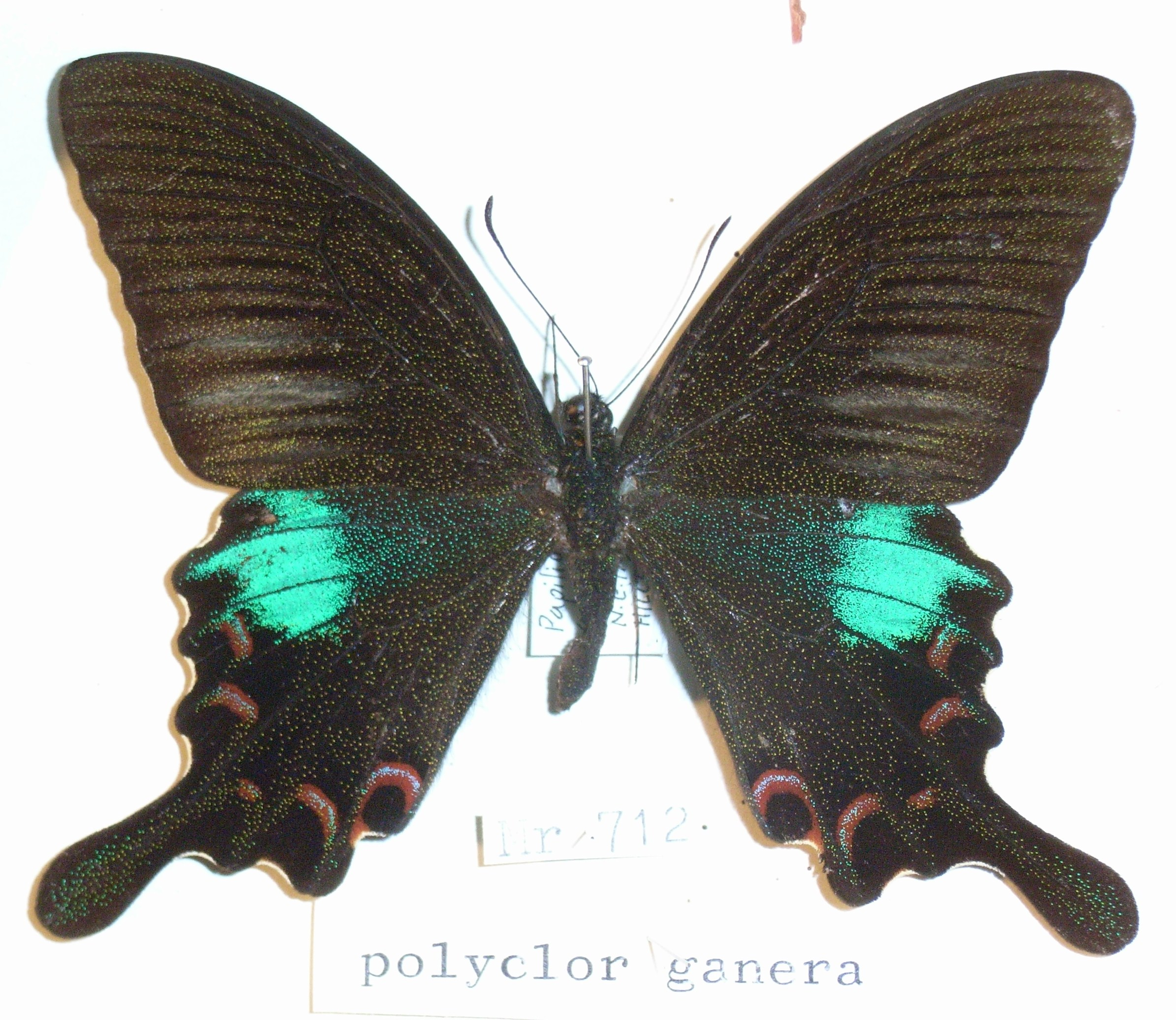
- P. p. ganesa
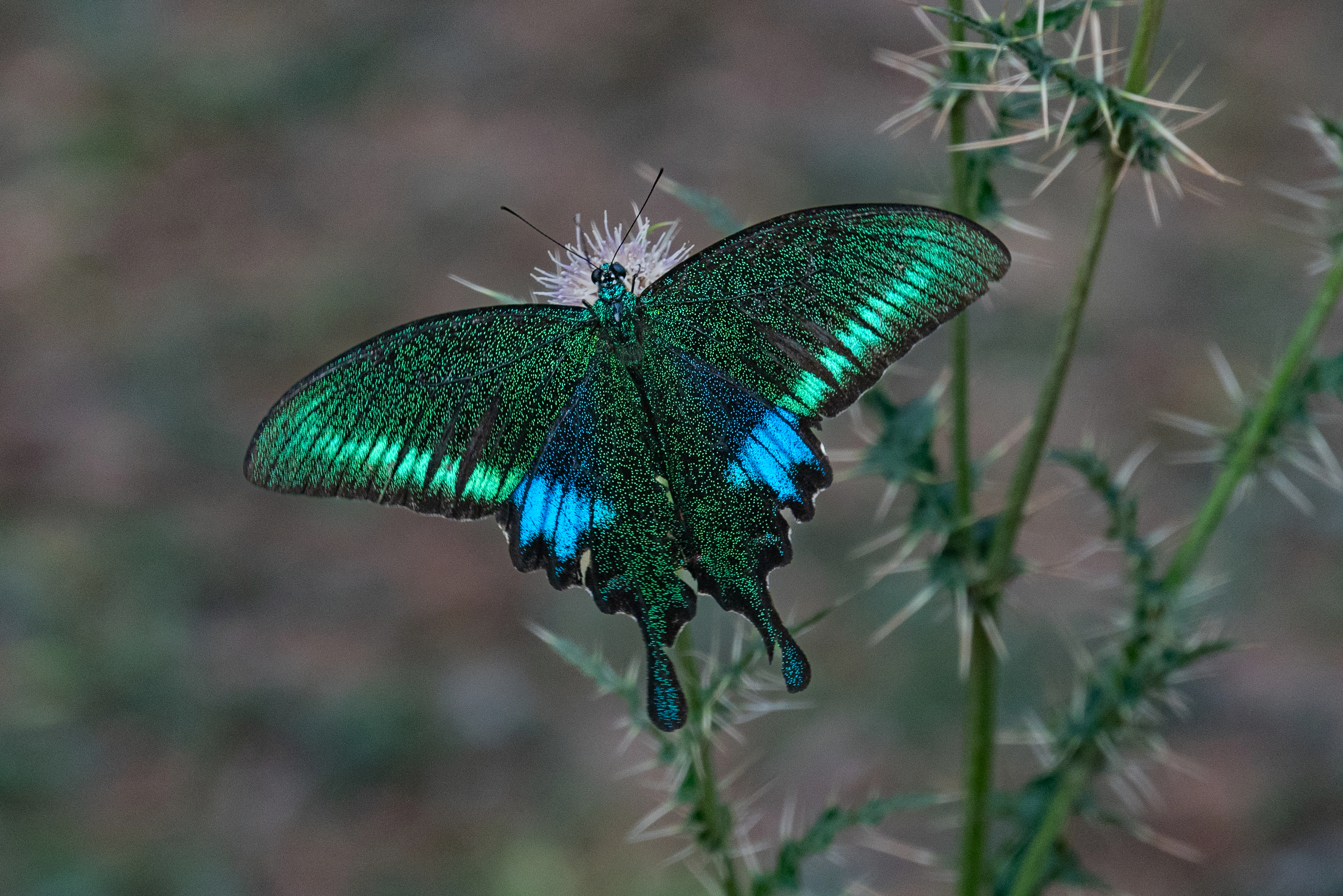

Scientific classification
- Kingdom: Animalia
- Phylum: Arthropoda
- Class: Insecta
- Order: Lepidoptera
- Family: Papilionidae
- Genus: Papilio
- Species: P. polyctor

Binomial name
- Papilio polyctor Boisduval, 1836

= Papilio polyctor =

Common peacock

Species of butterfly

Papilio polyctor, the common peacock or indian peacock is a swallowtail butterfly found in the Indian subcontinent. It is found in the Himalayas and parts of India from the foothills to 7,000 feet (2,100 m) between March and October. It has distinct dry- and wet-season forms. The butterfly frequents Buddleia flowers. Its food plant is Zanthoxylum alatum of the family Rutaceae. Papilio polyctor has three subspecies, consisting of Papilio polyctor significans, Papilio polyctor stockleyi, and Papilio polyctor xiei.

== Description ==
The sexes are very nearly alike, and the difference slight between the dry-season and wet-season broods. Upperside dull black thickly irrorated (sprinkled) with golden-green scales Forewing: a broad subterminal golden-green band that varies in length, but in all specimens is more or less diffuse and obsolescent towards the costal margin; in specimens of the wet-season broods this band is slightly broader than in those of the dry season, also broader in the female than in the male. Hindwing: the irroration of golden-green scales less dense, turning to blue on the anterior portions of the wing; a broad bright blue upper discal patch that stops well short of the termen, and has its outer margin uneven, occupies the base of interspace 4 and the outer portions of interspaces 5, 6, and 7; below, this patch is continued in interspaces 1 to 3 by much smaller diffuse quadrate spots of brilliant golden-green scales, that are prominent in wet-season forms, more obscure in the dry. The discal patch itself is variable in size; in some specimens there is only a trace of it in interspace 4. Tornus with a conspicuous subterminal claret-red lunule, traversed inwardly by an obscure blue line and edged above the lunule, narrowly, by velvety black; indications generally of a similar lunule in interface 2; finally a terminal series of large velvety-black markings that form on the tail broad borders to the green irroration down its middle. Cilia broadly edged with white in the interspaces. Underside chocolate brown, somewhat thinly irrorated with yellowish scales, which are absent however, from a more or less triangular patch in the middle of the forewing posteriorly, but coalesce and form an ill-defined very short subterminal band just above the tornal angle of that wing. Hindwing: a conspicuous subterminal series of claret-red lunules each traversed inwardly by a line of purplish blue, followed by velvety-black spots and broad white terminal lunules. Antennae, head, thorax and abdomen brownish black; the head, thorax and abdomen above, thinly irrorated with green scales.

== Range ==
Eastern Afghanistan, Pakistan, Kashmir, India (from Sikkim to Assam), Nepal, Bhutan, Myanmar, Thailand, northern Vietnam and Laos.

== Flight ==
The Indian peacock butterfly is most striking when in flight. The depth and shades of green and blue change with the angle of light falling on its wings.

== Status ==
It is considered common and is not threatened.

== Life history ==
Larva - dull green with some yellowish markings, thorax with a remarkable shield-like covering projecting a little over the head and marked with slender involute black lines; 7th to the 12th segments with lateral obliquely placed pale yellowish lines.

Pupa - pale green with yellow and white markings. Head cleft, back strongly arched; "sides flattened out with a hard sharp ridge running longitudinally round the whole insect." (Harford, as quoted by Moore.)

== Taxonomy ==
It is a member of the species group paris

== See also ==
- List of butterflies of India (Papilionidae)
