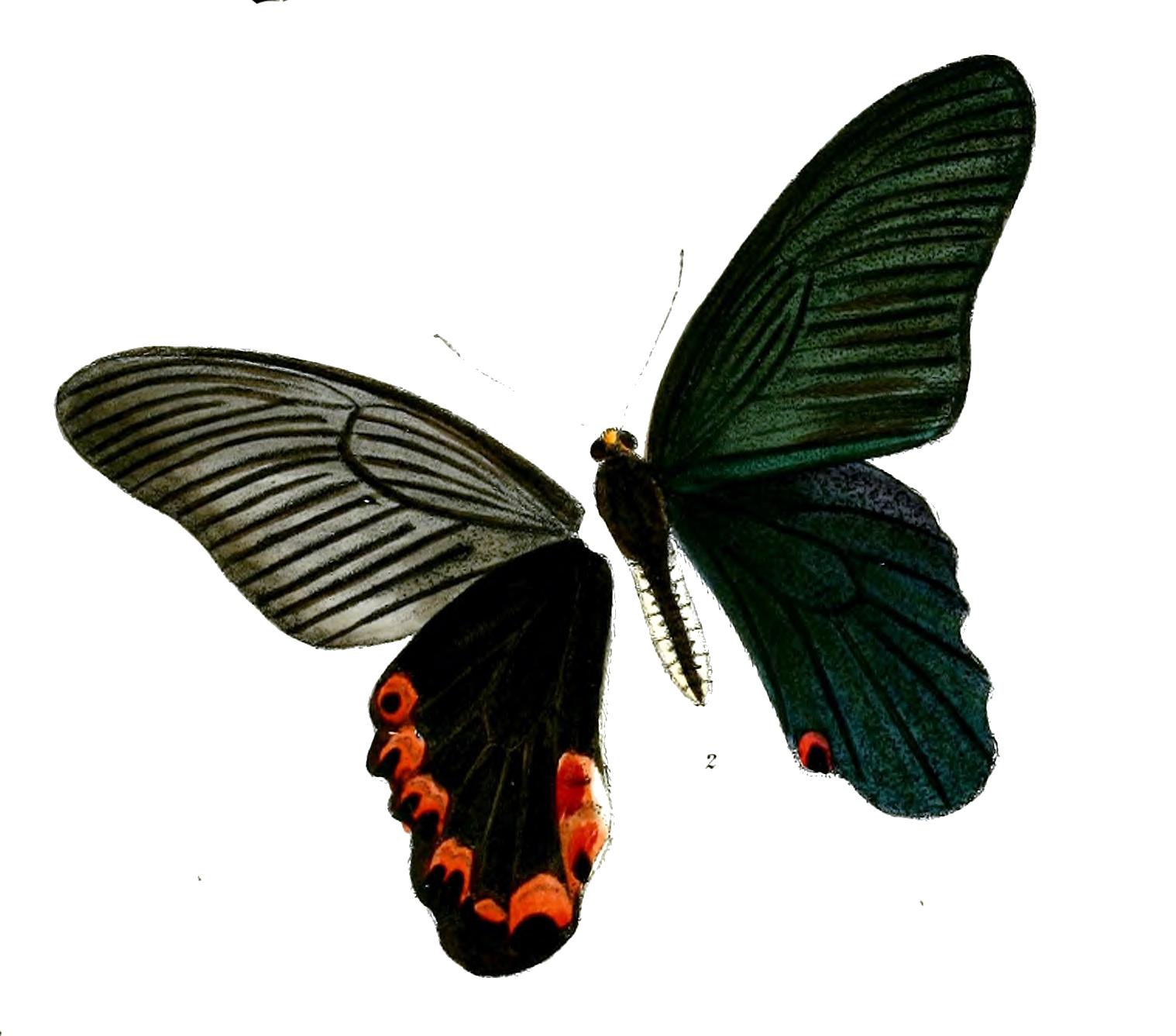
- Male upperside (right) and underside (left)

Scientific classification
- Kingdom: Animalia
- Phylum: Arthropoda
- Clade: Pancrustacea
- Class: Insecta
- Order: Lepidoptera
- Family: Papilionidae
- Genus: Papilio
- Species: P. elephenor

Binomial name
- Papilio elephenor Doubleday, 1845

= Papilio elephenor =

Yellow-crested spangle

Species of butterfly

Papilio elephenor, the yellow-crested spangle, is a species of swallowtail butterfly found in Northeast India. Following decades without confirmed sightings, it was rediscovered in 2009 in Assam.

== Description ==
Male upperside dull black. Forewing with an irroration (sprinkling) of brilliant green scales that form cellular and internervular streaks. Hindwing: anterior half to nearly the median vein and above vein 5 irrorated with brilliant blue scales that become gradually sparse towards and cease entirely along the costal margin; posterior half irrorated with brilliant green scales; tornus with a small claret-red patch touched above with a few violet scales and also with an admarginal dusky black spot. Cilia brown alternated with white. Underside black. Forewing with very broad and prominent cellular and internervular pale streaks, the costal margin and the basal half of interspaces 1a and 1 distinctly black. Hindwing: a series of claret-red subterminal lunules, two side by side in each interspace, all more or less irrorated inwardly with violet scales; at the tornal angle these lunules form a conspicuous oblong patch that stretches a short way along the dorsum and bears a subbasal and a subapical black spot. Antennae, the thorax and abdomen narrowly along the middle black; head pinkish red; abdomen on the sides buff coloured.

Female "Agrees with the male. The anal (tornal) red mark on the hindwings above is larger, rounded, marginal, and includes a small black spot, the outer margin (termen) of the hindwing is distinctly sinuate between the median veins (veins 2, 3, 4), and at the, end of the upper median nervule (vein 4) produced into a short but obvious tooth as at the extremity of the lower discoidal vein (vein 5)." (Rothschild quoted in Bingham)Karl Jordan in Seitz.

== Taxonomy ==
It is a member of the species group paris

== See also ==
- List of butterflies of India
- List of butterflies of India (Papilionidae)
