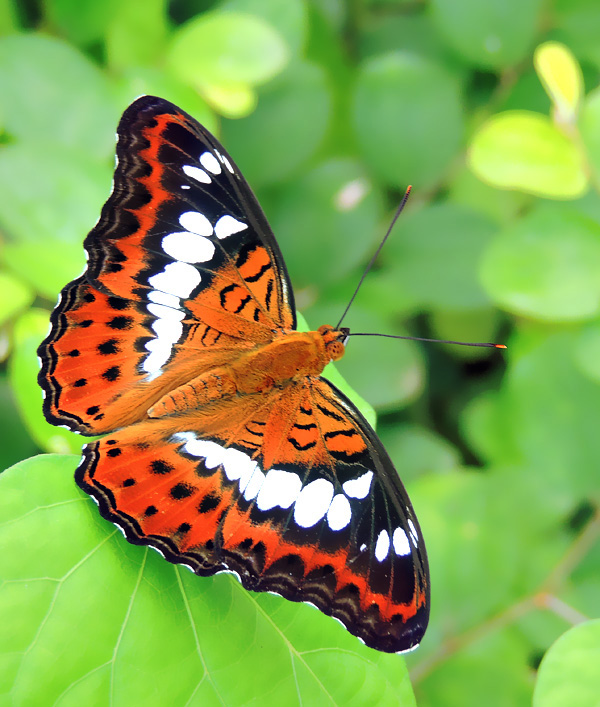
- Commander (M. p. undifragus) from Mangaon, Maharashtra, India

Scientific classification
- Domain: Eukaryota
- Kingdom: Animalia
- Phylum: Arthropoda
- Class: Insecta
- Order: Lepidoptera
- Family: Nymphalidae
- Genus: Moduza
- Species: M. procris

Binomial name
- Moduza procris (Cramer, 1777)

Synonyms
- Limenitis procris (Cramer, 1777)

= Moduza procris =

Commander

Species of butterfly

Moduza procris, the commander, sometimes included in the genus Limenitis, is a medium-sized, strikingly coloured brush-footed butterfly found in South Asia and Southeast Asia. It is notable for the mode of concealment employed by its caterpillar and the cryptic camouflage of its pupa.

== Description ==
The commander has a wingspan of about 6 to 7.5 cm (2.4 to 3.0 in). The upperside of its wings are a bright reddish brown. Towards the centre of the wing are broad white spots. In flight, one can see a bright red brown butterfly with a white band forming a V shape. There are also a few white spots scattered on the wings. Its hindwings have crenulated margins. The undersides of the wings are a whitish grey toward the base and have a row of dull reddish brown and a row of black spots along the margins. The male and female are similar in appearance.

Male and female. Upper side, ground colour rich ferruginous-red, the basal area slightly tinged with olivescent yellowish-ferruginous. Cilia alternately black and white. Forewing with three black slender bars crossing the cell, and three similar bars below the cell between the basal interspaces of the middle and lower medians; beyond the cell is a large outwardly-oblique pure bluish-white more or less triangulate spot followed by a transverse discal macular band, broadest in the dry-season brood, composed of a series of large broad pure bluish-white spots proceeding from the costa to the posterior margin, of which the upper five are subapical and disposed obliquely outward, the third and fourth being ovate, the upper two very slender and divided by the second subcostal branch, the fifth much the smallest; the next four are disposed somewhat obliquely inward and are much larger, the sixth (or upper) triangularly ovate, the seventh longest and bluntly ovate or somewhat quadrate, the eighth quadrate with its outer edge indented, and the lowest narrow; all these white spots are bordered with black, which colour broadly extends from the cell along the costa and thence decreases hindward; beyond is an outer marginal broad lunularly inner-edged, or occasionally dentate, black waved band, which is traversed by two contiguous slender grey sinuous marginal lines. Hindwing with three black slender bars crossing the cell, and a small spot between the basal interspaces of the veins above the cell; a transverse medial discal broad pure bluish-white macular black-bordered band terminating at the submedian, its inner edge somewhat regular and its outer edge scalloped; followed by an outer discal row of black ill-shaped cordate spots, which are more or less obsolescent posteriorly, or occasionally entirely absent, a similar submarginal row of smaller dentate spots, and then a contiguous narrow waved black marginal band traversed by two slender grey sinuous lines. Underside. Basal area bluish or olive-grey, the outer discal area and the apical veins of forewing bright red; discocellular spot on forewing and transverse discal macular band, as above, bluish-white or greyish-white and black bordered; basal bars black, with the interspace between the middle cell bars and of those below the cell on the forewing bright red; marginal markings as above, except that the marginal sinuous fines are violet-grey, and the inner line broadly encompassing the submarginal black spots on the hindwing. Body above red; palpi above black, beneath greenish-white; body beneath and legs bluish-grey; antennse black, tip reddish beneath; eyes bronzy-brown.

— Frederic Moore, Lepidoptera Indica. Vol. III

== Range ==
Subspecies:

- M. p. procris Central India, Sikkim to South China, Thailand, South Myanmar, Cambodia, Indo-China
- M. p. calidosa (Moore, 1858) Ceylon
- M. p. anarta (Moore, 1877) Andaman Islands
- M. p. arnoldi (Fruhstorfer, 1898) Bawean, Kangean Islands
- M. p. undifragus (Fruhstorfer, 1906) South India
- M. p. milonia (Fruhstorfer, 1906) Peninsular Malaya, Thailand
- M. p. minoe (Fruhstorfer, 1906) Sumatra
- M. p. batuna (Fruhstorfer, 1906) Batu Islands
- M. p. aemonia (Weymer, 1883) Nias
- M. p. agnata (Fruhstorfer, 1897) Borneo
- M. p. neutra (Fruhstorfer, 1897) Java, Bali, Lombok
- M. p. laubenheimeri (Hagen, 1898) Mentawai Islands
- M. p. sumbawana (Fruhstorfer, 1913) Sumbawa
- M. p. sumbana (Fruhstorfer, 1913) Sumba
- M. p. floresiana (Fruhstorfer, 1906) Flores
- M. p. bankana (Fruhstorfer, 1913) Bangka Island
- M. p. florensis (Fruhstorfer, 1913) Flores
- M. p. tioma Eliot, 1978 Pulau Tioman

== Range within India ==
Sri Lanka, Peninsular India, the Himalayas east of the Dun valley, through Kumaon, Nepal, Sikkim to Assam, Arunachal, and onto Myanmar. Locally abundant, it is common from Sri Lanka to Maharashtra. It is rare in Gujarat and far more common in the Himalayas.

== Ecology ==
The commander is generally found in forested regions having moderate to heavy rainfall. It usually keeps to low elevations, that is, up to 900 metres (3,000 ft) into the hills.

It is fond of open glades, roadsides and clearings in forests. It is abundant along watercourses in dry and moist deciduous forests. It is also found close to villages or wherever its larval host plant Mussaenda frondosa is found. It is most common in the post-monsoon months and winter.

The commander can often be spotted basking with its wings pressed flat on exposed stones in streambeds. Individuals settle down on an exposed perch high up in the trees during the heat of the day. At this time it can be seen defending its territory and driving intruding butterflies away.

This butterfly has a swift flight with rapid wingbeats and alternate spurts of smooth gliding. A powerful flier, it nevertheless flies for short distances at a time. Being wary, it maintains its distance and is best caught when engrossed in mud-puddling or feeding from flowers. It regularly visits flowers from low-lying herbs to high up in the trees. Though this is a mud-puddling species, in Borneo and probably elsewhere, adults do not visit carrion or old fruit to drink liquids.

=== Host plants ===
Most of the larval host plants belong to the family Rubiaceae.

- Cadaba fruticosa
- Grewia nervosa
- Prunus dulcis
- Cinchona
- Mitragyna parvifolia
- Mussaenda frondosa
- Mussaenda philippica
- Neolamarckia cadamba
- Ochreinauclea missionis
- Wendlandia
- Wendlandia heynei
- Wendlandia thyrsoidea
- Hedyotis orixense

== Life cycle ==
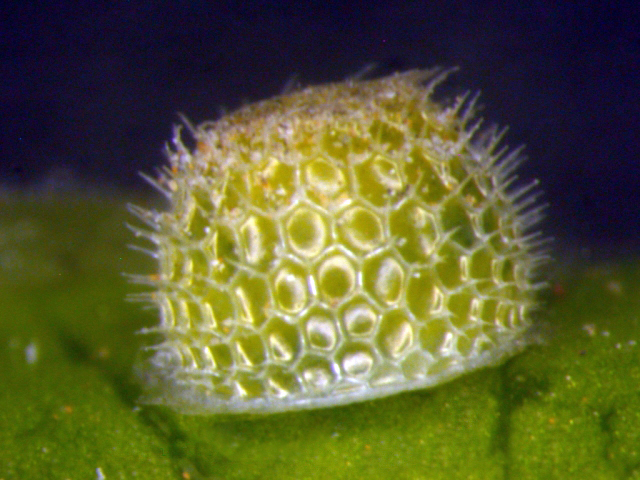
Egg

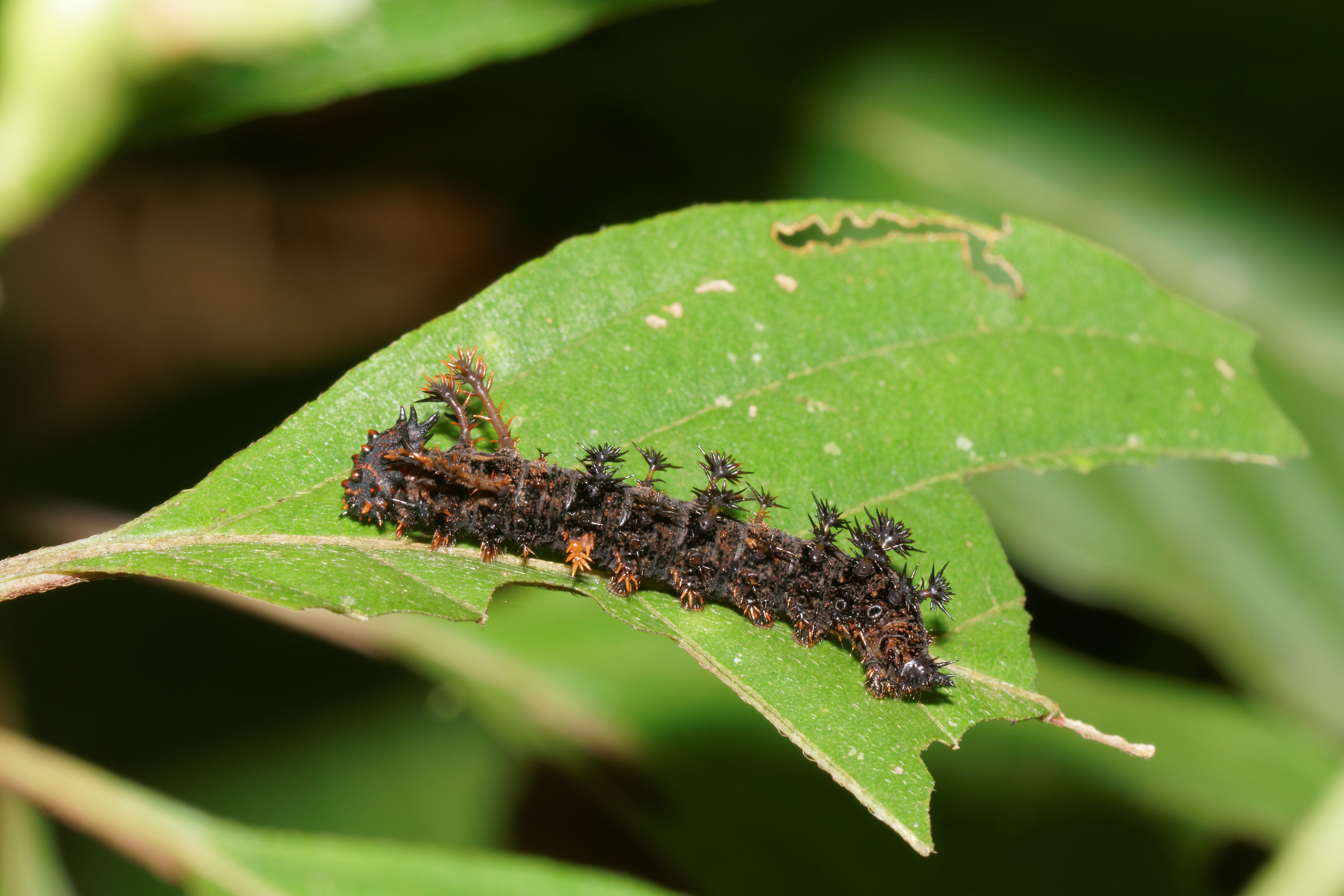
Caterpillar

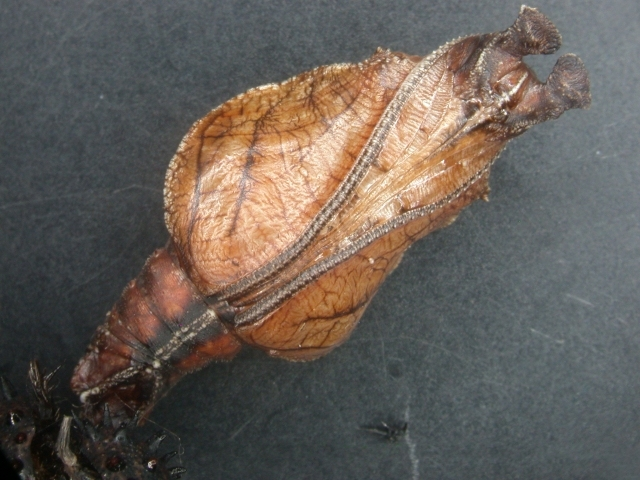
Chrysalis, ventral

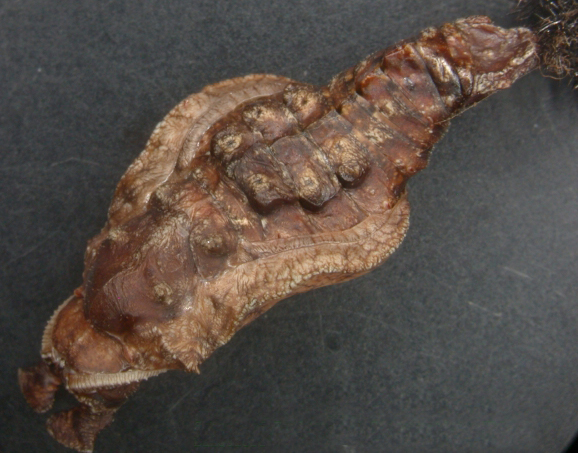
Chrysalis, dorsal

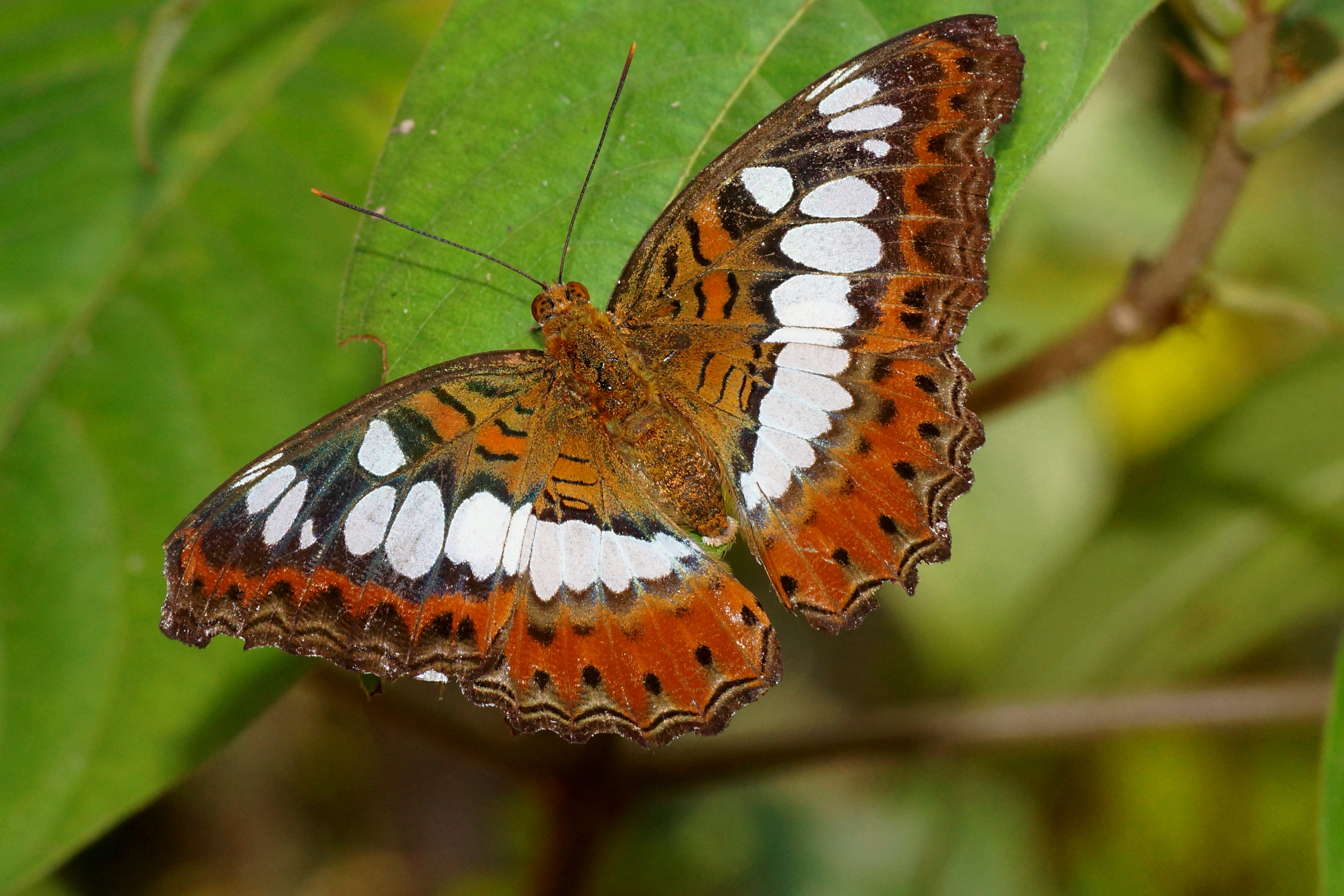
Imago (adult) M. p. undifragus, South India

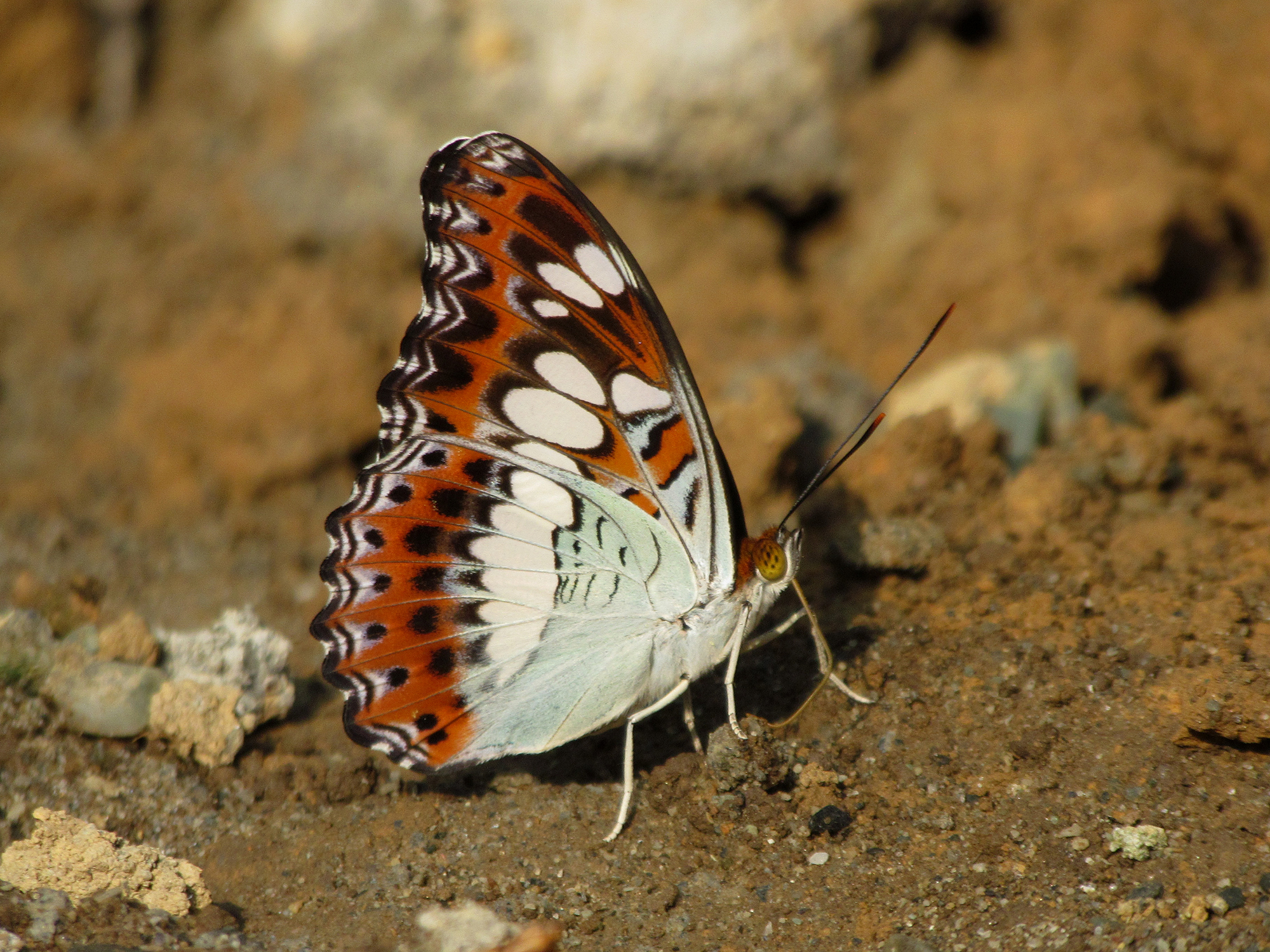

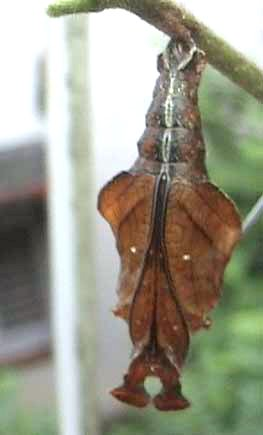
Pupa in natural pose

=== Egg ===
The female commander lays a single egg on the underside of the tip of a leaf of the food plant. The egg is hairy and greenish and looks like a green strawberry. The egg hatches in 3 to 4 days.

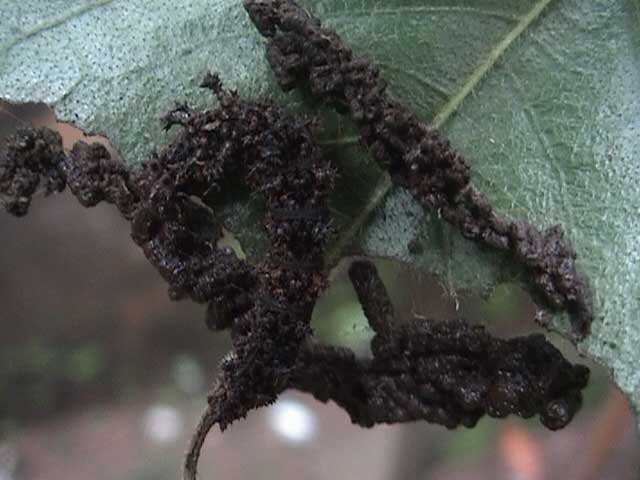
Frass chain of the commander caterpillar, used for defence

=== Caterpillar ===
The caterpillar is dirty brown with a chestnut tinge and dark brown splotches all over. The body also bears numerous processes which help to break up its outline. The behaviour of this caterpillar is very interesting in that it is one of the species of butterfly that makes long chains of frass. It eats up part of the leaf it is on and uses bits of leaves which are strung up with silk along with droppings. The caterpillar rests on the exposed mid-rib of a leaf after removing the leafy portions on the sides. This behaviour may be to dissuade ants from crossing over the chain of frass behind which the caterpillar rests.

=== Pupa ===
Before pupating, the caterpillar wanders around, often far away from the plant it fed on. It pupates among dried leaves and twigs. The pupa is brownish and rough in texture. It is angular with prominent wing expansions and bears flat processes on the head which curl together making a hole between them. It also has numerous lines and markings that make it look like a rolled up dried leaf.
