= Mussaenda uniflora =

Scientific classification
- Kingdom: Plantae
- Clade: Tracheophytes
- Clade: Angiosperms
- Clade: Eudicots
- Clade: Asterids
- Order: Gentianales
- Family: Rubiaceae
- Subfamily: Ixoroideae
- Tribe: Mussaendeae
- Genus: Mussaenda
- Species: M. uniflora

Binomial name
- Mussaenda uniflora Wall. ex G.Don (1834)

Synonyms
- Acranthera uniflora (Wall. ex G.Don) Kurz (1872); Aphaenandra sumatrana Miq. (1857); Aphaenandra uniflora (Wall. ex G.Don) Bremek. (1937); Carinta matthewii (Ridl.) Thoth. (1963); Geophila matthewii Ridl. (1934); Mussaenda angustifolia Wall. ex G.Don (1834); Mussaenda theifera Pierre ex Pit. (1923), nom. illeg.

Genus of plants

Mussaenda uniflora is a species of flowering plant in the family Rubiaceae. It is a subshrub native to Bangladesh, Myanmar (Burma), Thailand, Laos, Vietnam, Java and Sumatra.
