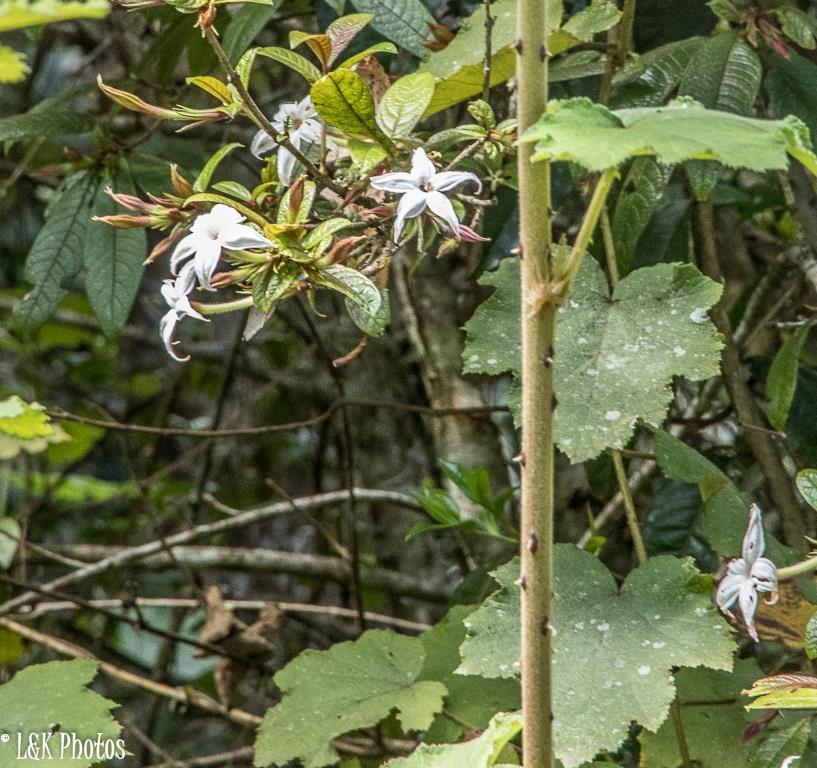
- Bremeria humblotii

Scientific classification
- Kingdom: Plantae
- Clade: Embryophytes
- Clade: Tracheophytes
- Clade: Spermatophytes
- Clade: Angiosperms
- Clade: Eudicots
- Clade: Asterids
- Order: Gentianales
- Family: Rubiaceae
- Subfamily: Ixoroideae
- Tribe: Mussaendeae
- Genus: Bremeria; Razafim. & Alejandro

Type species
- Bremeria landia (Poir.) Razafim. & Alejandro

= Bremeria =

Genus of plants

Bremeria is a genus of flowering plants in the family Rubiaceae. It was described in 2005 to accommodate all the Indian Ocean species formerly placed in Mussaenda, except the widespread Mussaenda arcuata. The genus is indigenous to Madagascar, Mauritius and Réunion, and is found in humid to subhumid evergreen forests.

== Species ==
- Bremeria arachnocarpa (Wernham) A.P.Davis & Razafim. - Madagascar
- Bremeria decaryi (Homolle) Razafim. & Alejandro - Madagascar
- Bremeria erectiloba (Wernham) Razafim. & Alejandro - Madagascar
- Bremeria eriantha (A.Rich.) A.P.Davis & Razafim. - Madagascar
- Bremeria fuscopilosa (Baker) Razafim. & Alejandro - Madagascar
- Bremeria humblotii (Wernham) Razafim. & Alejandro - Madagascar
- Bremeria hymenopogonoides (Baker) Razafim. & Alejandro - Madagascar
- Bremeria landia (Poir.) Razafim. & Alejandro - Mauritius + Réunion
  - Bremeria landia var. holosericea (Sm.) A.P.Davis & Razafim. - Mauritius + Réunion
  - Bremeria landia var. landia - Mauritius + Réunion
  - Bremeria landia var. stadmanii (Michx. ex DC.) A.P.Davis & Razafim. - Mauritius
- Bremeria latisepala (Homolle) Razafim. & Alejandro - Madagascar
- Bremeria monantha (Wernham) Razafim. & Alejandro - Madagascar
- Bremeria perrieri (Homolle) Razafim. & Alejandro - Madagascar
- Bremeria pervillei (Wernham) Razafim. & Alejandro - Madagascar
- Bremeria pilosa (Baker) Razafim. & Alejandro - Madagascar
- Bremeria punctata (Drake) Razafim. & Alejandro - Madagascar
- Bremeria scabrella (Wernham) A.P.Davis & Razafim. - Madagascar
- Bremeria scabridior (Wernham) Razafim. & Alejandro - Madagascar
- Bremeria trichophlebia (Baker) Razafim. & Alejandro - Madagascar
- Bremeria vestita (Baker) Razafim. & Alejandro - Madagascar
