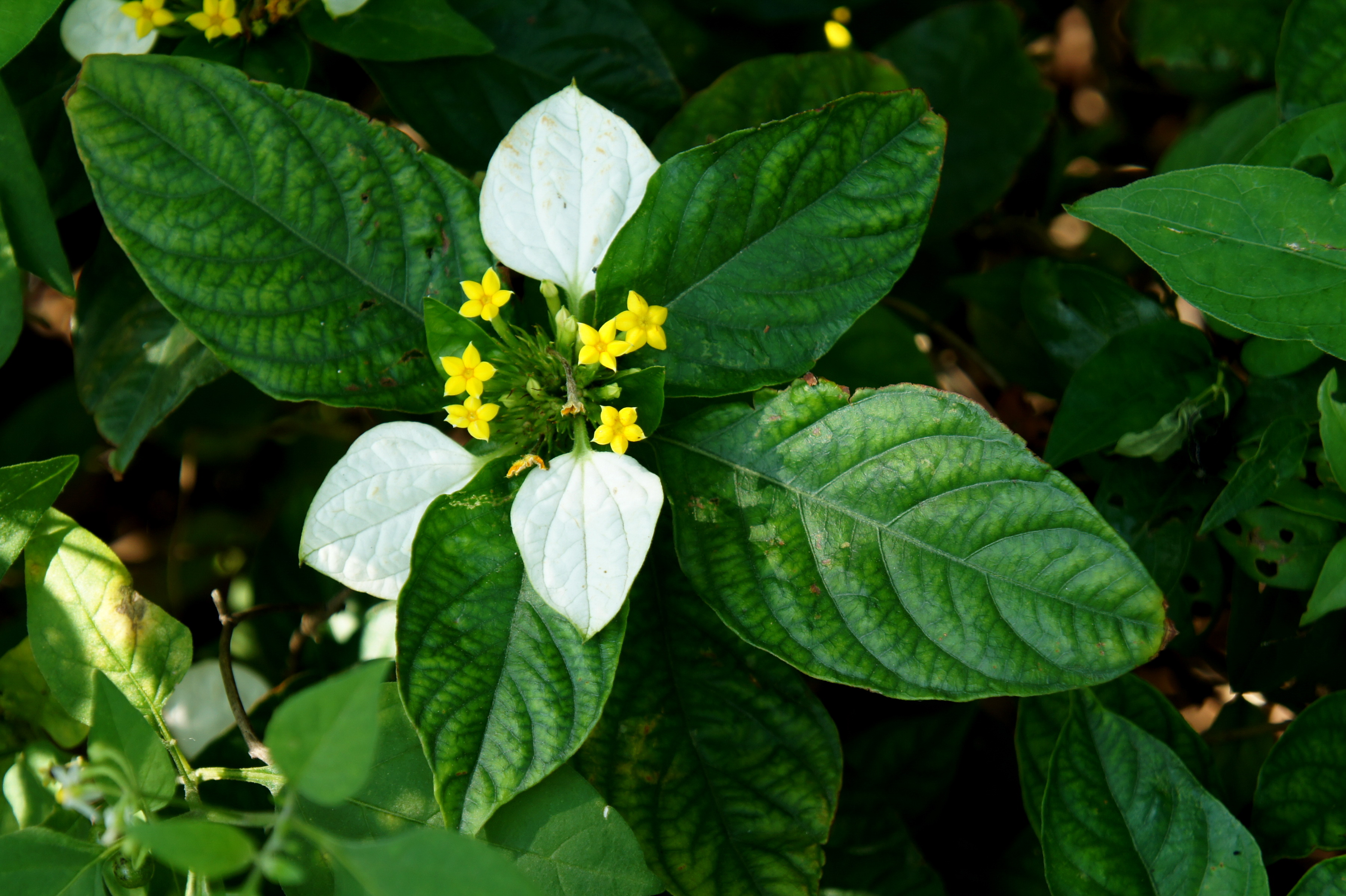

Scientific classification
- Kingdom: Plantae
- Clade: Tracheophytes
- Clade: Angiosperms
- Clade: Eudicots
- Clade: Asterids
- Order: Gentianales
- Family: Rubiaceae
- Genus: Mussaenda
- Species: M. pubescens

Binomial name
- Mussaenda pubescens Dryand

= Mussaenda pubescens =

Species of plant

Mussaenda pubescens is a plant from the coffee family, Rubiaceae that is found in Indonesia.

The plant grows wild on hillsides, shrubs, and is often cultivated as an ornamental plant. To the Sumatran Malays, this plant is known as daun putri or nusa indah (though the latter name refers to other species). Its twigs, leaves and roots are used as medicine.
