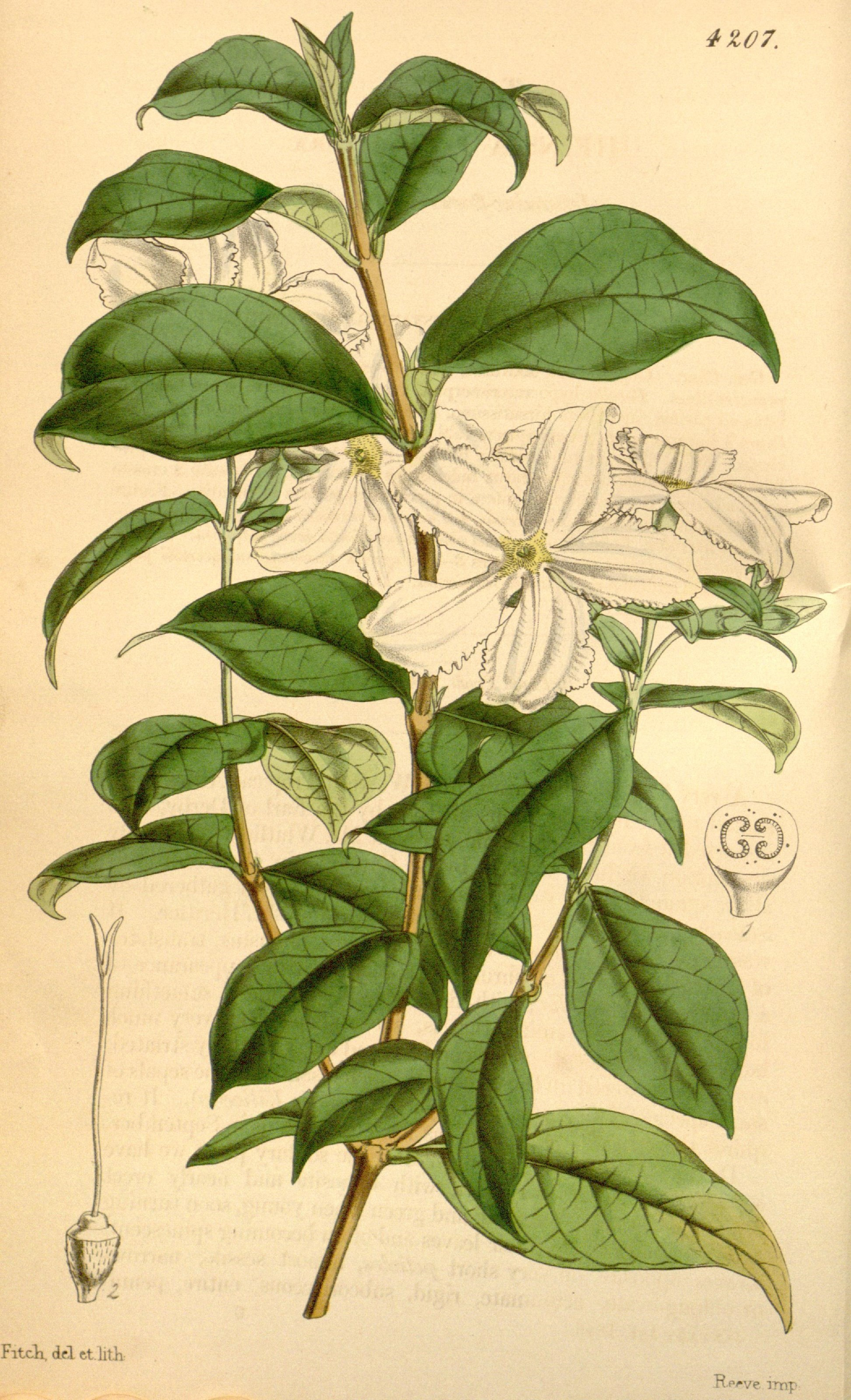
- Heinsia crinita

Scientific classification
- Kingdom: Plantae
- Clade: Tracheophytes
- Clade: Angiosperms
- Clade: Eudicots
- Clade: Asterids
- Order: Gentianales
- Family: Rubiaceae
- Tribe: Mussaendeae
- Genus: Heinsia; DC.

= Heinsia =

Genus of plants

Heinsia is a small genus of flowering shrubs or small trees in the family Rubiaceae. They are native to tropical Africa. The genus was first formally named in 1830 by Augustin Pyramus de Candolle.

== Species ==
As of December 2019, the following five species are accepted in Plants of the World Online:

- Heinsia bussei Verdc.
- Heinsia crinita (Wennberg) G.Taylor
- Heinsia mozambicensis (Verdc.) J.E.Burrows & S.M.Burrows
- Heinsia myrmoecia (K.Schum.) N.Hallé
- Heinsia zanzibarica (Bojer) Verdc.
