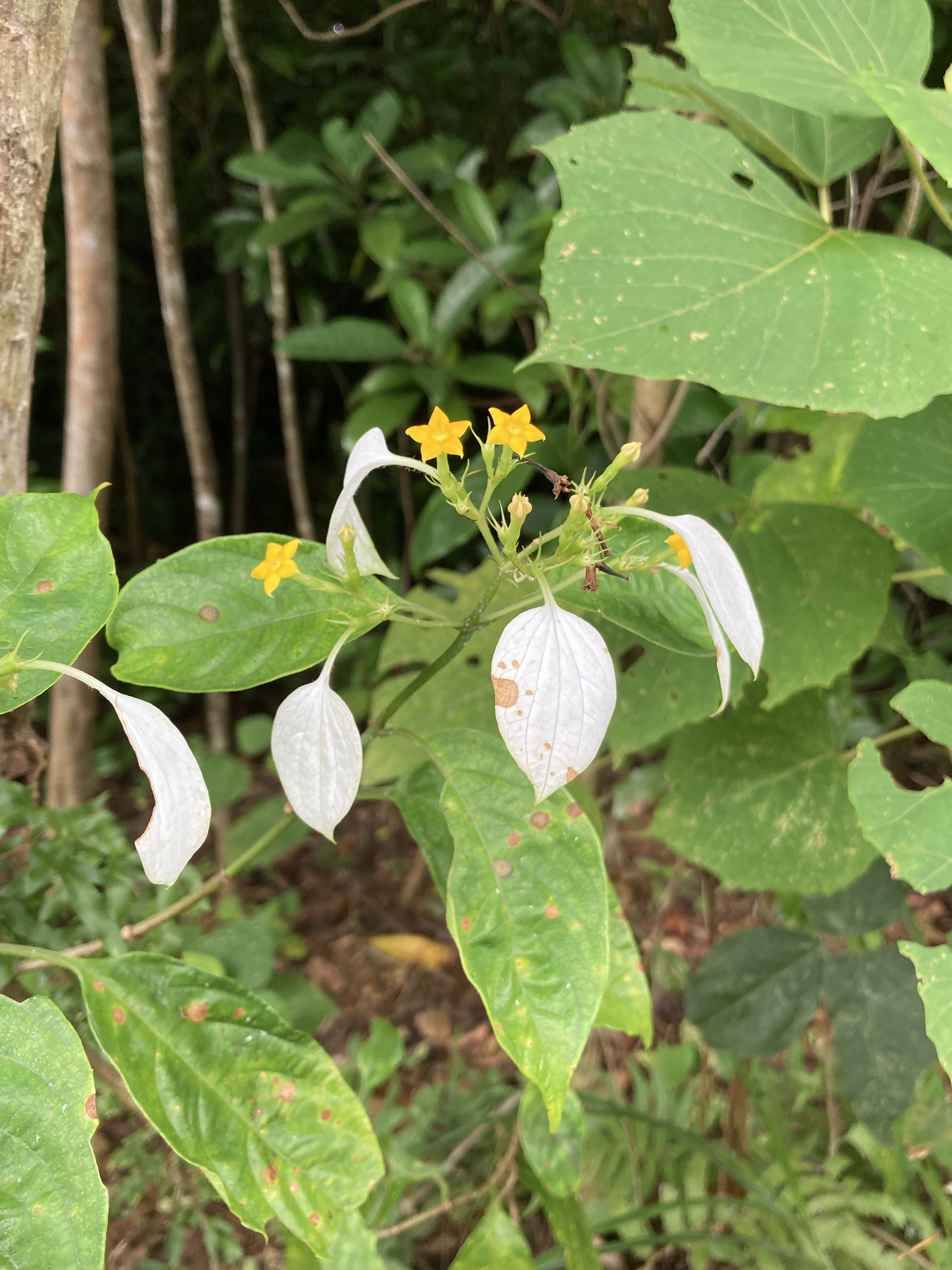
- Flowers and calyces
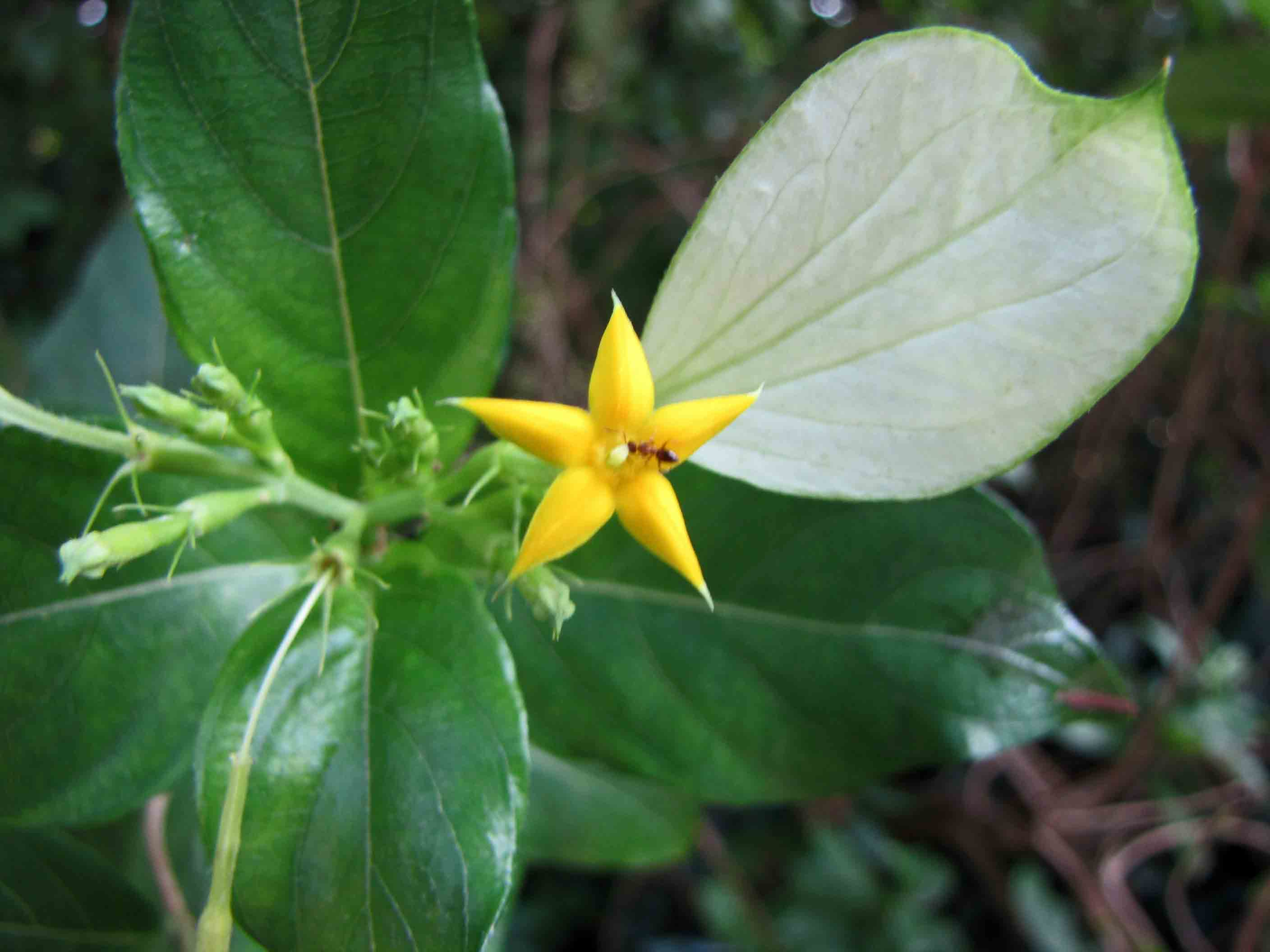
- Close up of flower

Scientific classification
- Kingdom: Plantae
- Clade: Tracheophytes
- Clade: Angiosperms
- Clade: Eudicots
- Clade: Asterids
- Order: Gentianales
- Family: Rubiaceae
- Genus: Mussaenda
- Species: M. parviflora

Binomial name
- Mussaenda parviflora Miq.

Synonyms
- Mussaenda albiflora Hayata; Mussaenda parviflora var. formosana Matsum.; Mussaenda parviflora var. yaeyamensis (Masam.) T.Yamaz.; Mussaenda pubescens var. yaeyamensis Masam.; Mussaenda taihokuensis Masam.; Mussaenda yaeyamensis (Masam.) Masam.

= Mussaenda parviflora =

Species of plant

Mussaenda parviflora is a species of flowering plant in the family Rubiaceae, native to Yakushima and the Ryukyu Islands of Japan, Taiwan, and Guangdong, China. A climbing shrub, it flowers March to May and fruits from August all the way to January.

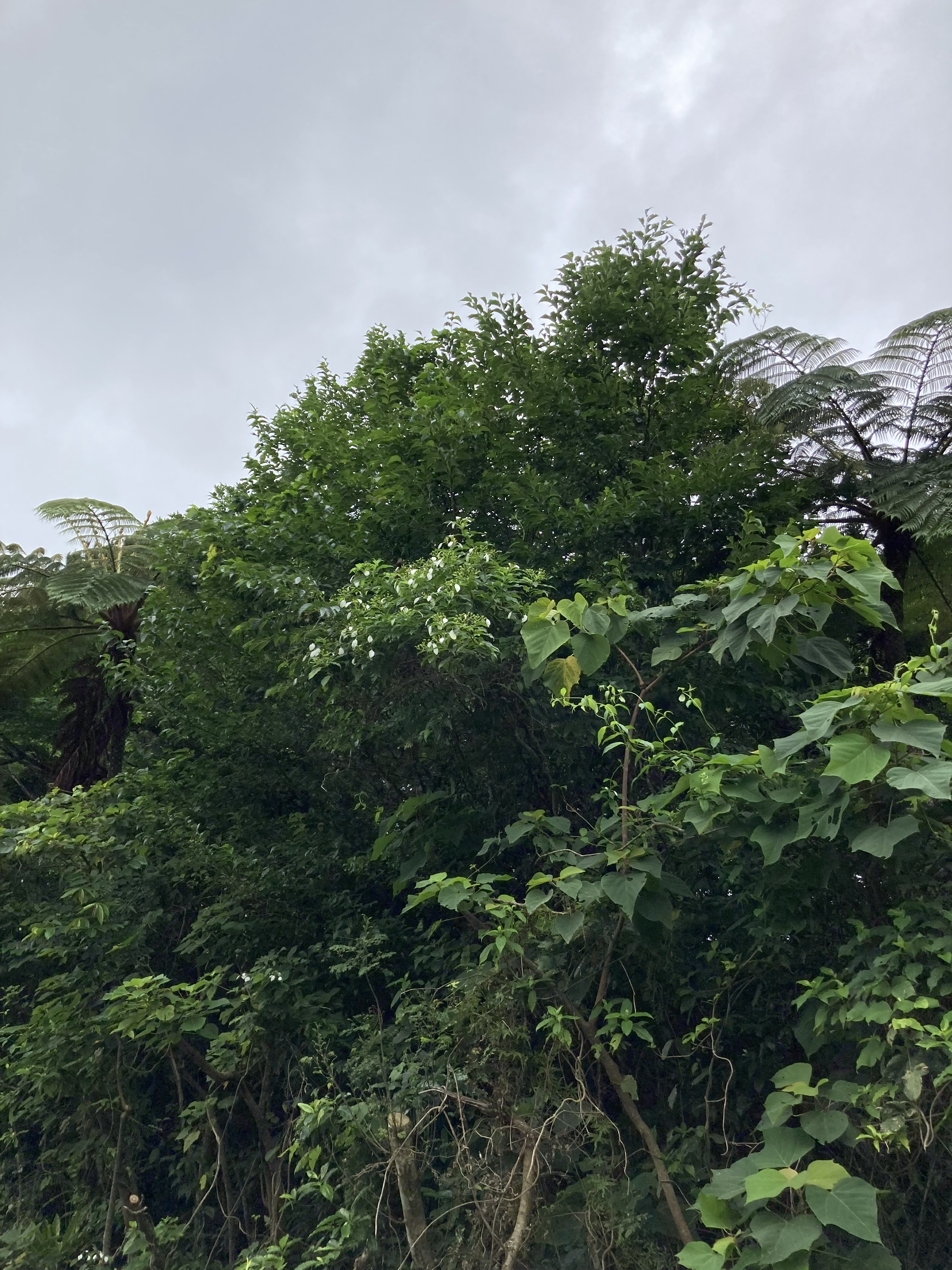
Habit

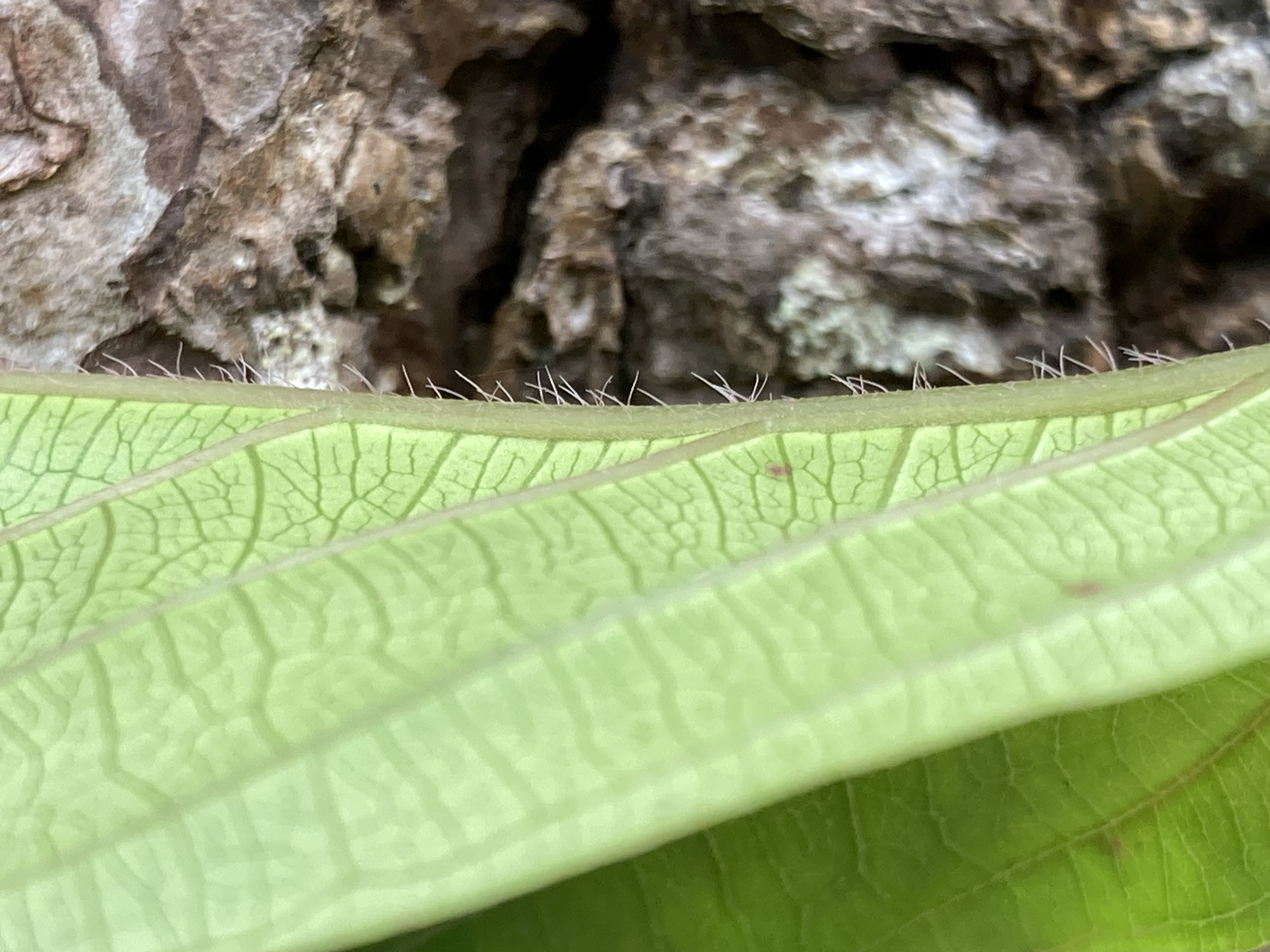
Midvein
