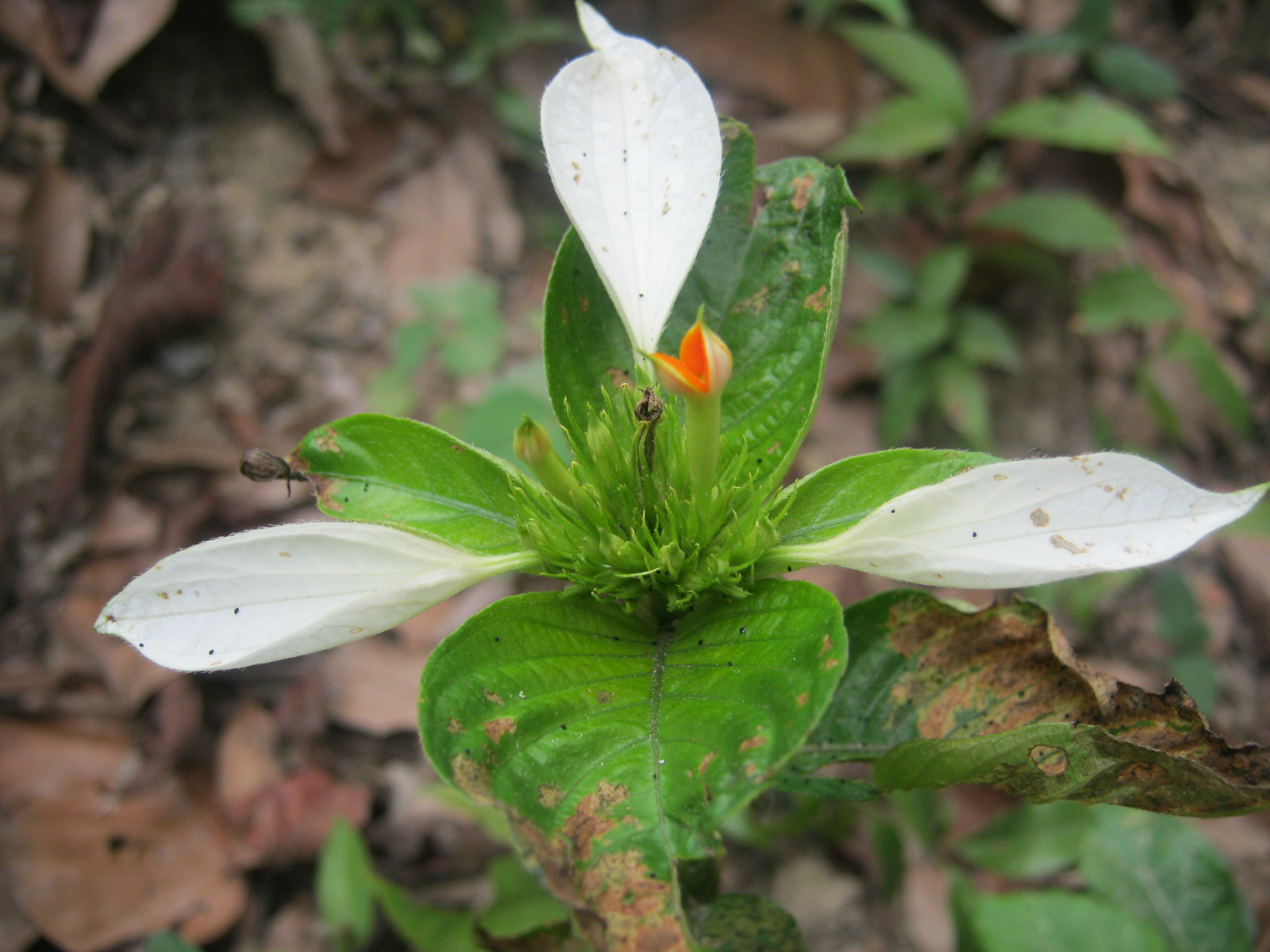

Scientific classification
- Kingdom: Plantae
- Clade: Tracheophytes
- Clade: Angiosperms
- Clade: Eudicots
- Clade: Asterids
- Order: Gentianales
- Family: Rubiaceae
- Genus: Mussaenda
- Species: M. macrophylla

Binomial name
- Mussaenda macrophylla Wall.

= Mussaenda macrophylla =

Species of plant

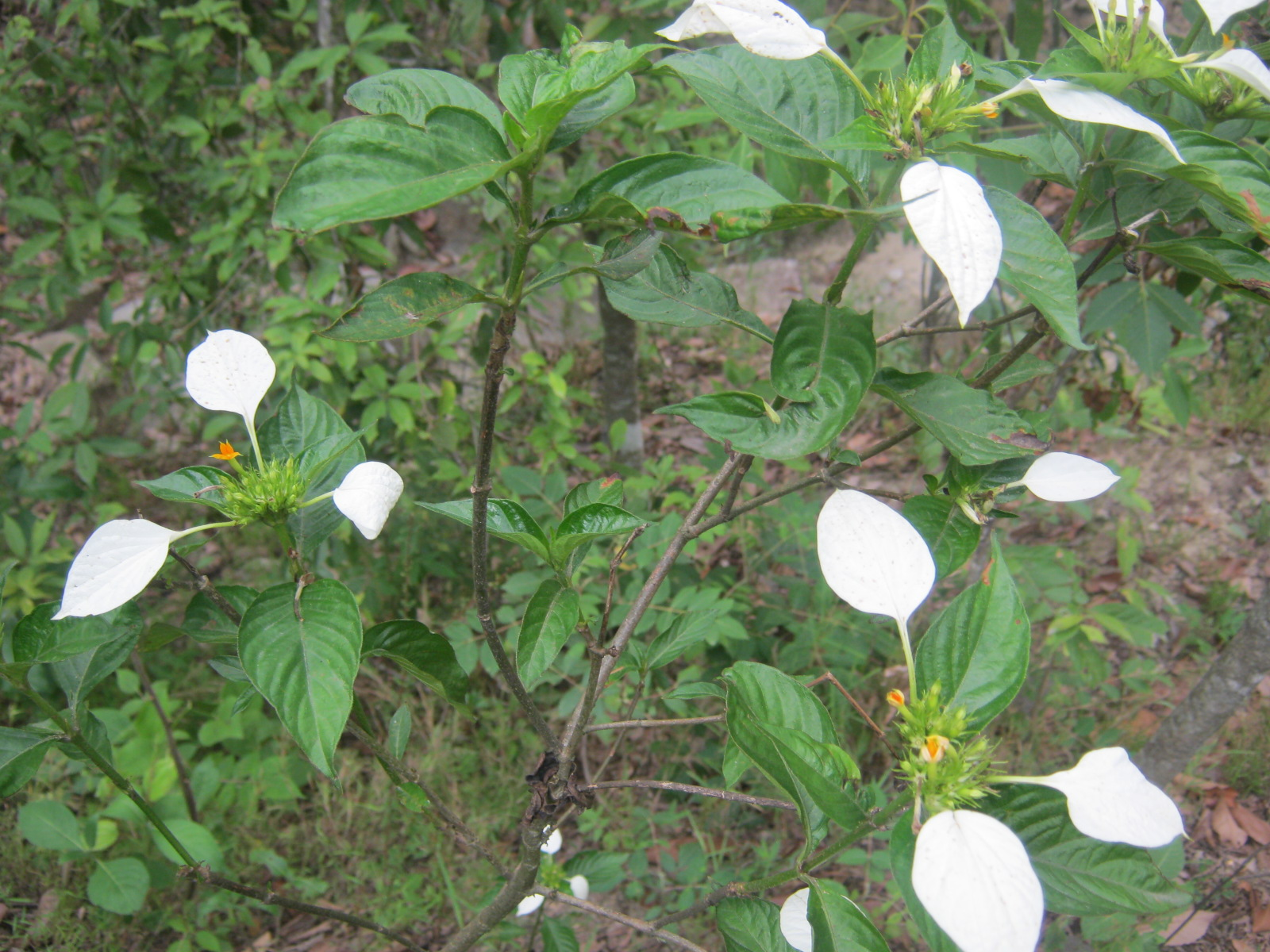
Mussaenda macrophylla plant in Panchkhal Valley, Nepal

Mussaenda macrophylla, commonly known as sweet root is an evergreen Asian shrub. The bracts of the shrub may have different shades, including red, white or some mixtures. M. macrophylla is native to Asian countries like China, Taiwan, Nepal, Myanmar, Malaysia, Philippines.
