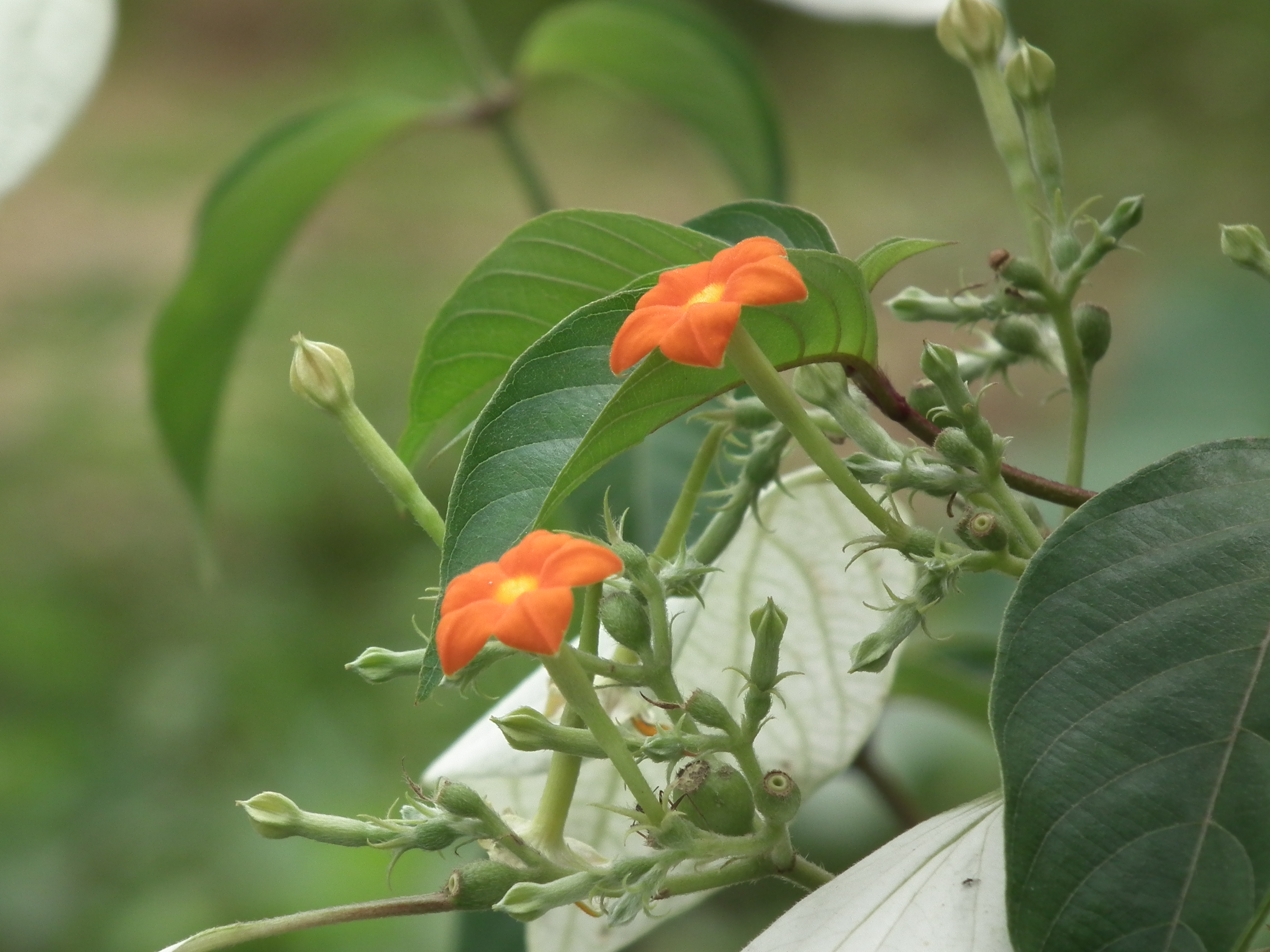
- Mussaenda frondosa

Scientific classification
- Kingdom: Plantae
- Clade: Tracheophytes
- Clade: Angiosperms
- Clade: Eudicots
- Clade: Asterids
- Order: Gentianales
- Family: Rubiaceae
- Subfamily: Ixoroideae
- Tribe: Mussaendeae; Hook.f.

Type genus
- Mussaenda L.

= Mussaendeae =

Genus of plants

Mussaendeae is a tribe of flowering plants in the family Rubiaceae and contains about 221 species in 8 genera. Its representatives are found from tropical and southern Africa, the western Indian Ocean, to tropical and subtropical Asia and the Pacific region.

== Genera ==
Currently accepted names

- Aphaenandra Miq. (1 sp)
- Bremeria Razafim. & Alejandro (18 sp)
- Heinsia DC. (5 sp)
- Landiopsis Capuron ex Bosser (1 sp)
- Mussaenda L. (187 sp)
- Neomussaenda Tange (2 sp)
- Pseudomussaenda Wernham (6 sp)
- Schizomussaenda H.L.Li (1 sp)

Synonyms

- Asemanthia Ridl. = Mussaenda
- Belilla Adans. = Mussaenda
- Epitaberna K.Schum. = Heinsia
- Landia Comm. ex A.Juss. = Bremeria
- Menestoria DC. = Mussaenda
- Spallanzania DC. = Mussaenda
