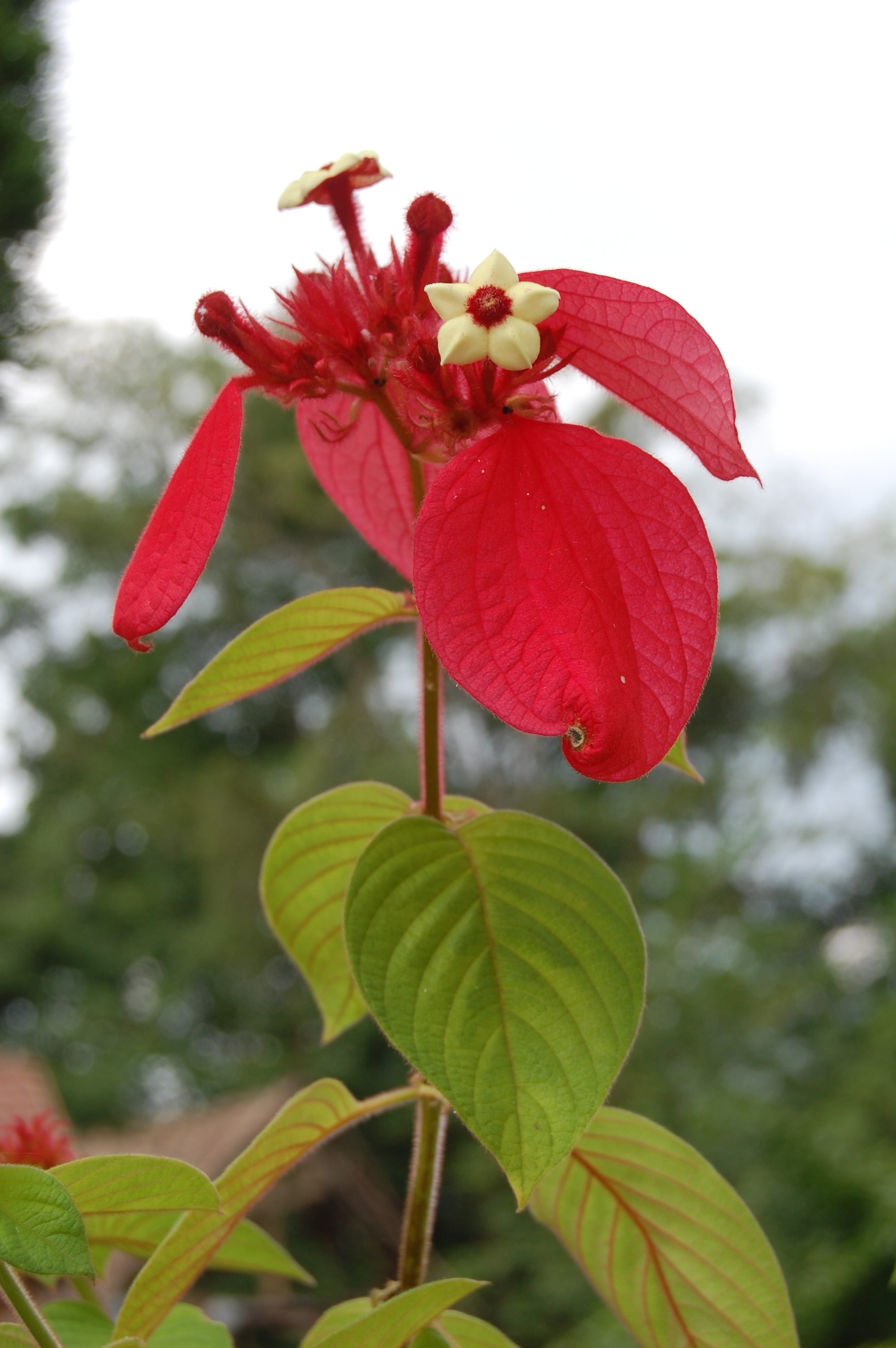

Scientific classification
- Kingdom: Plantae
- Clade: Tracheophytes
- Clade: Angiosperms
- Clade: Eudicots
- Clade: Asterids
- Order: Gentianales
- Family: Rubiaceae
- Genus: Mussaenda
- Species: M. erythrophylla

Binomial name
- Mussaenda erythrophylla Schumach. & Thonn. (1827)

= Mussaenda erythrophylla =

Species of plant

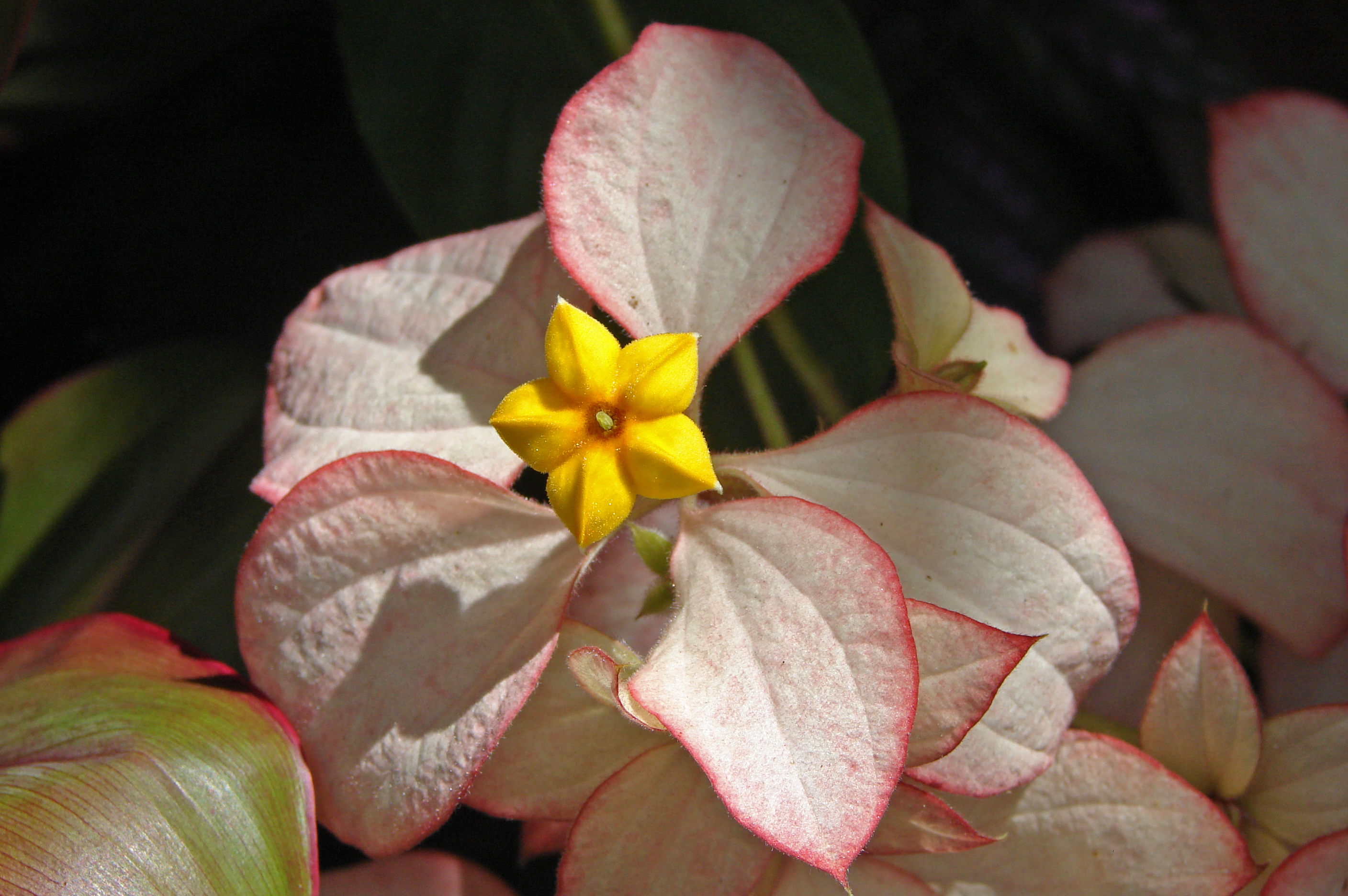
Flower closeup

Mussaenda erythrophylla, commonly known as Ashanti blood, red flag bush and tropical dogwood, is an evergreen West African shrub. The bracts of the shrub may have different shades, including red, rose, white, pale pink or some mixtures. Mussaenda erythrophylla grows best in warmly temperate or subtropical areas and is semideciduous in cooler parts. In its natural habitat the shrub may scramble up to 10 m (33 ft), but is kept compact under cultivation. The star-like flowers of the shrub are 10 mm (0.39 in) in diameter and have a single, modified sepal.

The caterpillars of the Commander (Limenitis procris), a brush-footed butterfly, utilize this species as a foodplant.
