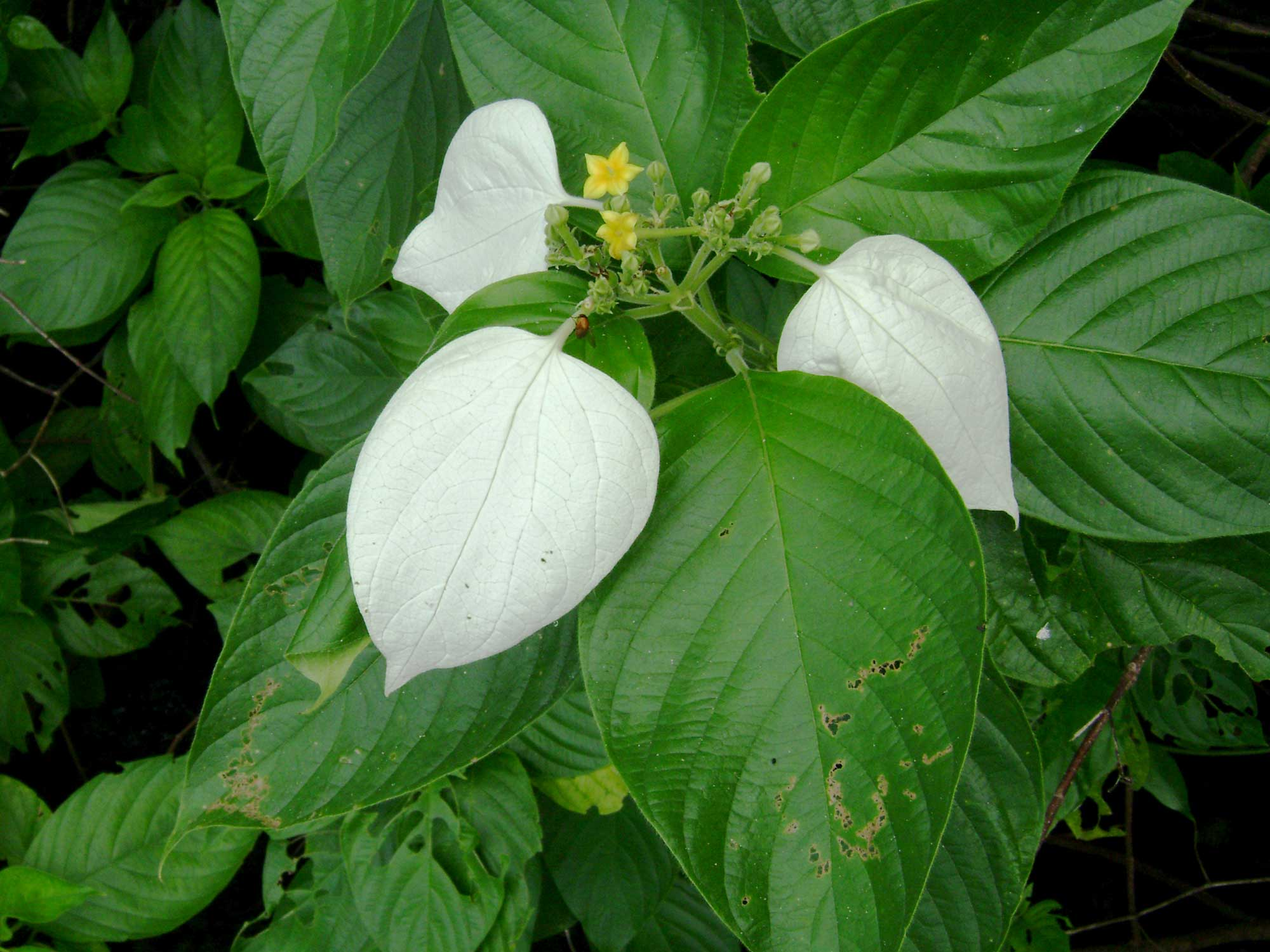

Conservation status
- Least Concern (IUCN 3.1)

Scientific classification
- Kingdom: Plantae
- Clade: Embryophytes
- Clade: Tracheophytes
- Clade: Angiosperms
- Clade: Eudicots
- Clade: Asterids
- Order: Gentianales
- Family: Rubiaceae
- Genus: Mussaenda
- Species: M. raiateensis

Binomial name
- Mussaenda raiateensis J.W.Moore (1933)

= Mussaenda raiateensis =

Species of shrub

Mussaenda raiateensis, commonly known as the Pacific mussaenda or Pacific flag-tree, is a plant of family Rubiaceae native to Tonga, Samoa, the Cook Islands and Society Islands in the South Pacific Ocean.
