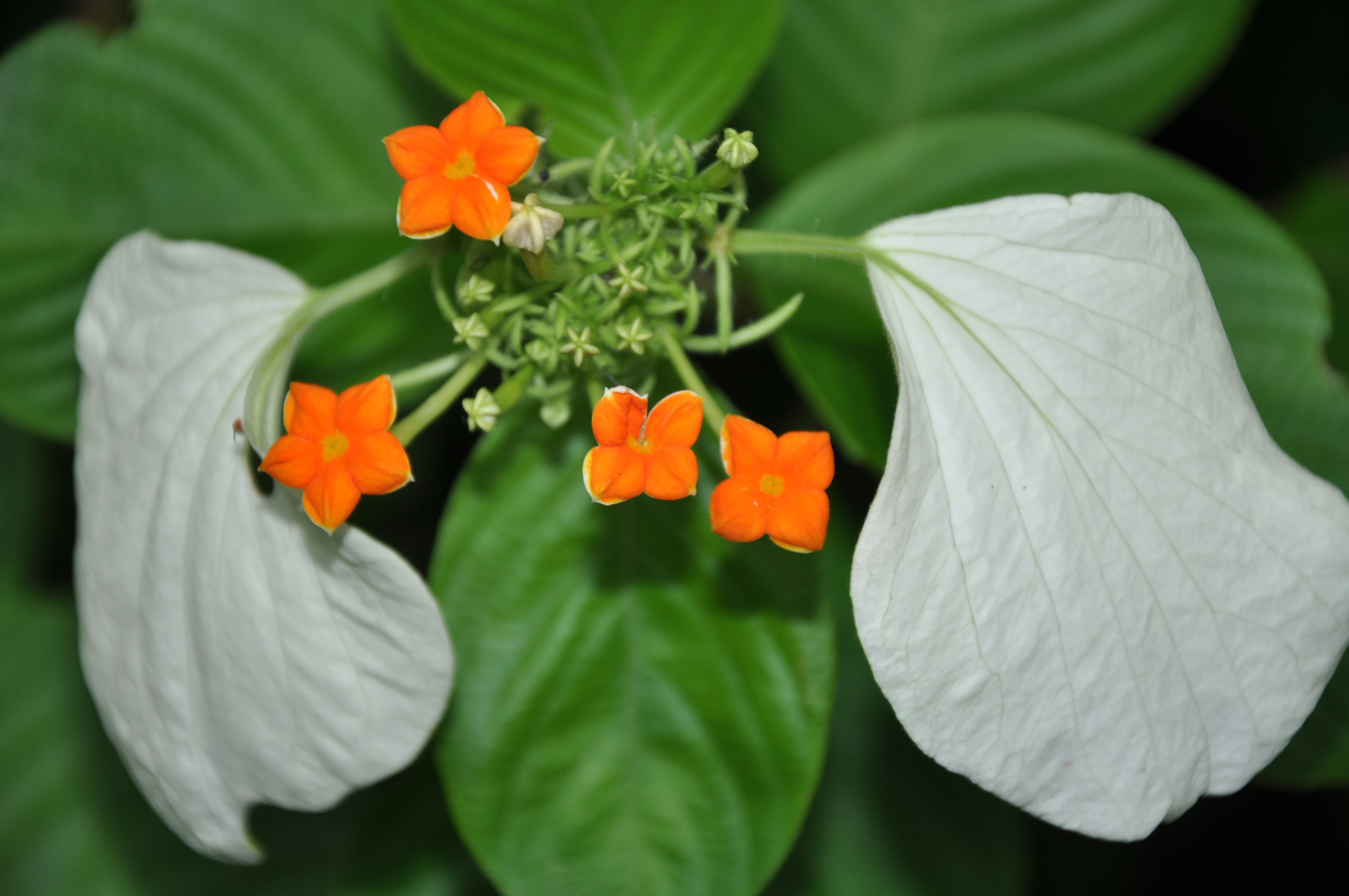

Scientific classification
- Kingdom: Plantae
- Clade: Tracheophytes
- Clade: Angiosperms
- Clade: Eudicots
- Clade: Asterids
- Order: Gentianales
- Family: Rubiaceae
- Genus: Mussaenda
- Species: M. villosa

Binomial name
- Mussaenda villosa Wall. ex G.Don

= Mussaenda villosa =

Species of shrub

Mussaenda villosa is a species of flowering shrub in the family Rubiaceae. It has orange petals and white bracts.
