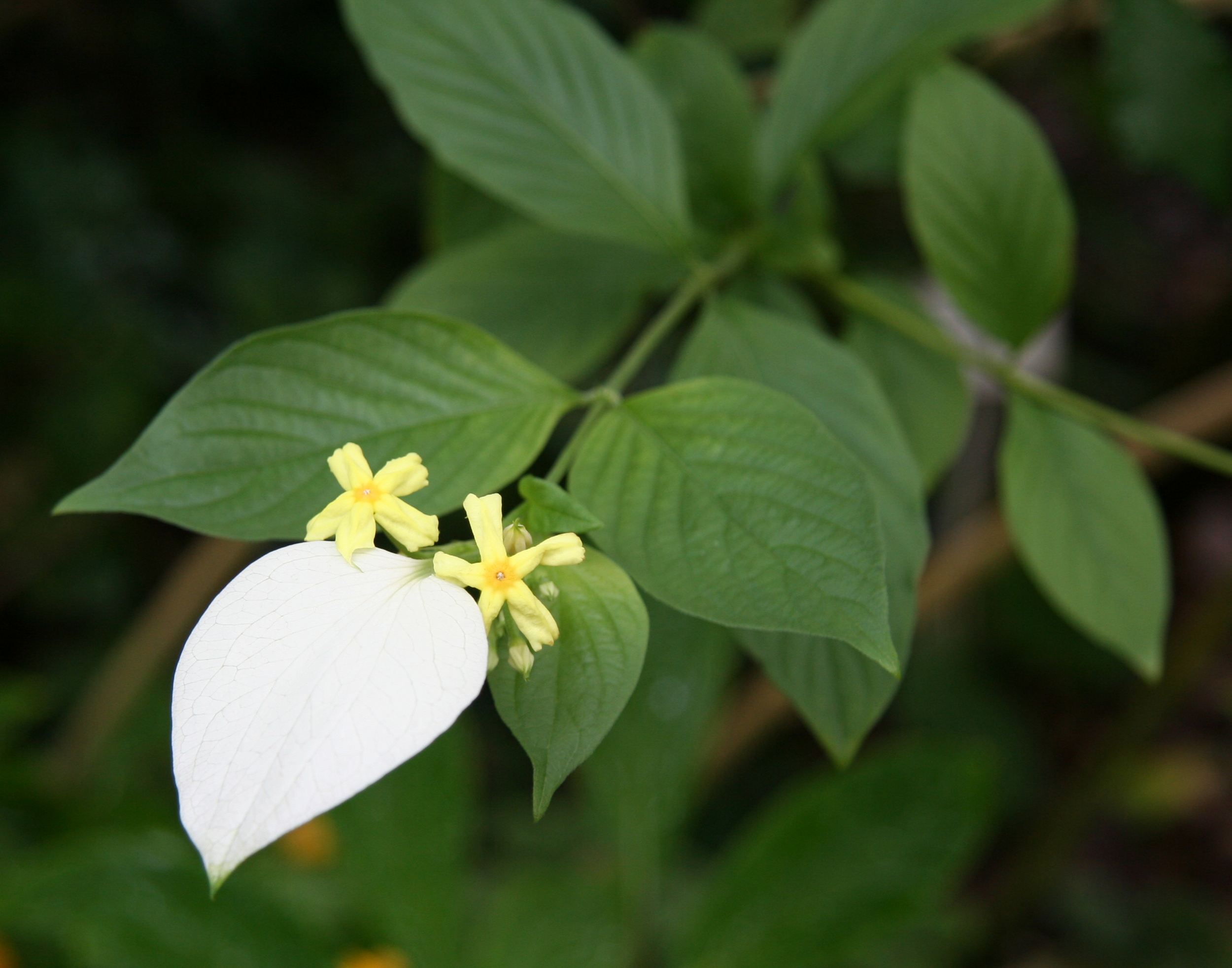
- Pseudomussaenda flava

Scientific classification
- Kingdom: Plantae
- Clade: Tracheophytes
- Clade: Angiosperms
- Clade: Eudicots
- Clade: Asterids
- Order: Gentianales
- Family: Rubiaceae
- Subfamily: Ixoroideae
- Tribe: Mussaendeae
- Genus: Pseudomussaenda; Wernham

= Pseudomussaenda =

Genus of plants

Pseudomussaenda is a genus of flowering plants belonging to the family Rubiaceae.

Its native range is Tropical Africa.

Species:

- Pseudomussaenda angustifolia Troupin & E.M.A.Petit
- Pseudomussaenda flava Verdc.
- Pseudomussaenda gossweileri Wernham
- Pseudomussaenda monteiroi (Wernham) Wernham
- Pseudomussaenda stenocarpa (Hiern) E.M.A.Petit
