= Landiopsis =

Conservation status
- Vulnerable (IUCN 3.1)

Scientific classification
- Kingdom: Plantae
- Clade: Tracheophytes
- Clade: Angiosperms
- Clade: Eudicots
- Clade: Asterids
- Order: Gentianales
- Family: Rubiaceae
- Subfamily: Ixoroideae
- Tribe: Mussaendeae
- Genus: Landiopsis; Capuron ex Bosser
- Species: L. capuronii

Binomial name
- Landiopsis capuronii Bosser

Genus of plants

Landiopsis is a monotypic genus of flowering plants belonging to the family Rubiaceae. It only contains one known species, Landiopsis capuronii.

It is native to Madagascar.

== Description ==
Landiopsis capuronii is a shrub which grows 2 to 5 meters high.

== Range and habitat ==
Landiopsis capuronii is native to northern Madagascar. There are eight known subpopulations in Diana and northern Sava regions.

It inhabits dry deciduous forests between 10 and 600 meters elevation.

== Conservation and threats ==
The species is threatened by habitat loss from human activities, including shifting cultivation and logging. There ia a subpopulation in Loky Manambato protected area.

== Name ==
The genus name of Landiopsis is in honour of Jérôme Lalande (1732–1807), a French astronomer, freemason and writer. The Latin specific epithet of capuronii refers to Botanist René Paul Raymond Capuron (1921–1971) who originally described the species. Both genus and species were first described and published in Adansonia, séries 3, Vol.20 on page 132 in 1998.
