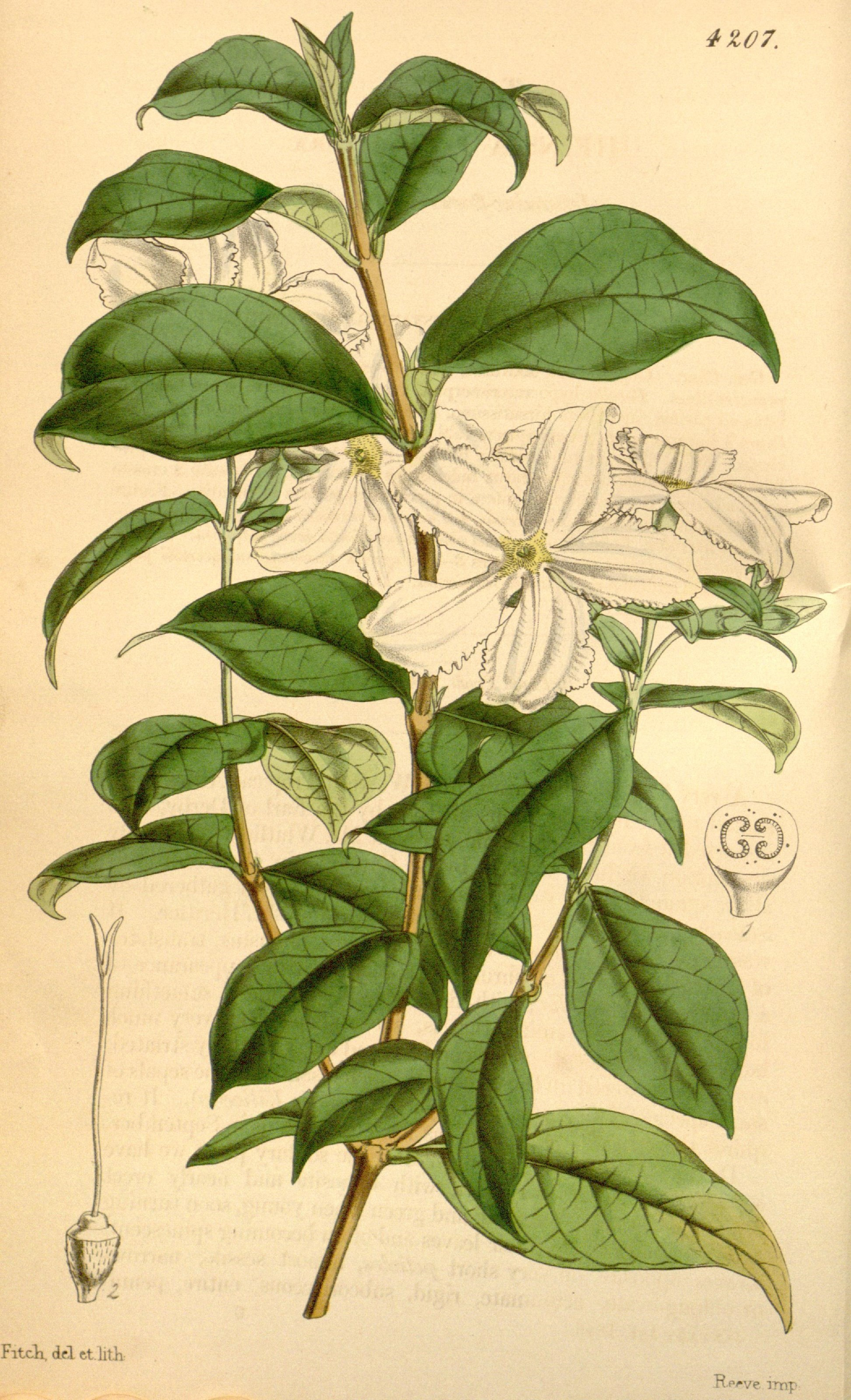

Scientific classification
- Kingdom: Plantae
- Clade: Tracheophytes
- Clade: Angiosperms
- Clade: Eudicots
- Clade: Asterids
- Order: Gentianales
- Family: Rubiaceae
- Genus: Heinsia
- Species: H. crinita

Binomial name
- Heinsia crinita (Afzel.) G.Taylor

Synonyms
- Gardenia crinita Afzel.

= Heinsia crinita =

Species of plant

Heinsia crinita (commonly known as bush apple) is a species of perennial shrub or small tree in the family Rubiaceae. It is native to tropical areas of Africa.

The fruit is harvested as a local source of food and the leaves are also eaten ("betete" or bitter leaves). Parts are also used in traditional medicine. It has been the subject of various studies. It is known as atama in Nigeria.
