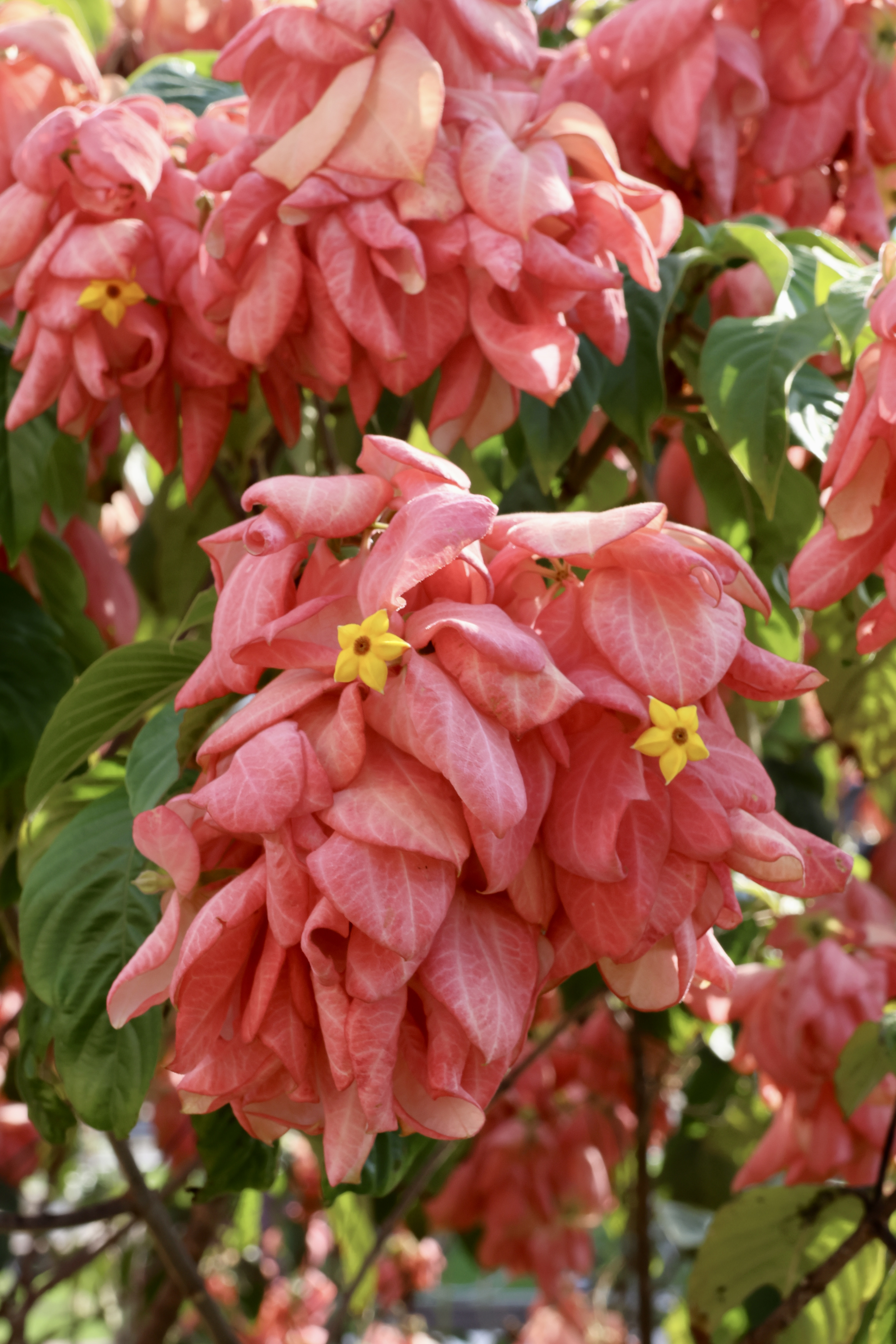

Scientific classification
- Kingdom: Plantae
- Clade: Embryophytes
- Clade: Tracheophytes
- Clade: Angiosperms
- Clade: Eudicots
- Clade: Asterids
- Order: Gentianales
- Family: Rubiaceae
- Genus: Mussaenda
- Species: M. philippica

Binomial name
- Mussaenda philippica A.Rich.

= Mussaenda philippica =

Species of plant

Mussaenda philippica (Aklan: Agboy) is a plant species in the family Rubiaceae that grows as a shrub or small tree. Native to the Philippines it is commonly grown elsewhere as an ornamental species.

Known varieties include: "Doña Luz" (pink), "Doña Alicia" (dark pink), "Queen Sirikit" (light pink), "Doña Aurora" (white), and "Doña Eva" (dark red).

== Mussaenda 'Doña Aurora' ==
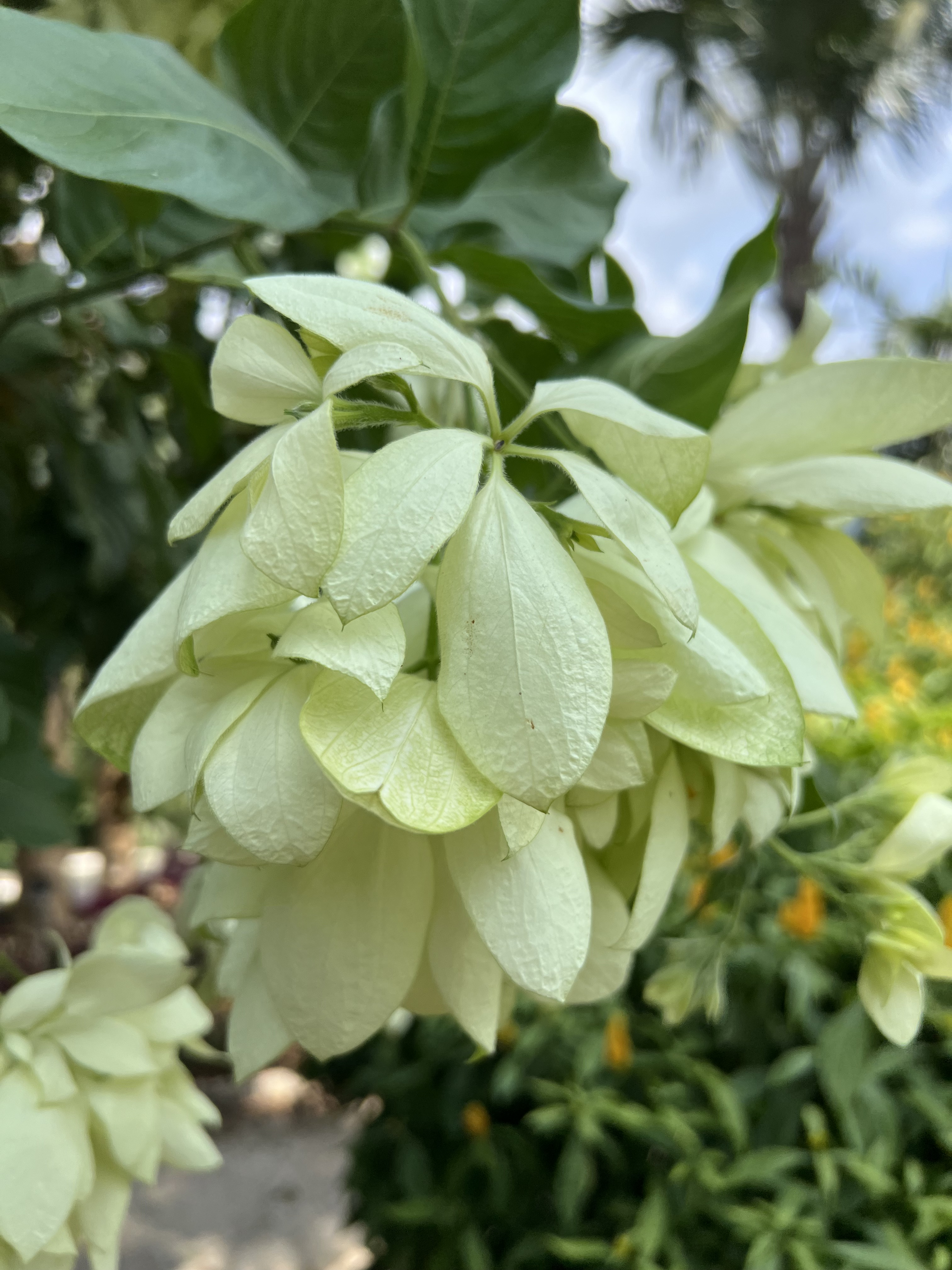
Mussaenda philippica "Doña Aurora"

'Doña Aurora' has calyx lobes all petaloid, creamy to greenish-white above; prominent greenish-white veins below. After anthesis, lobes become more greenish-tinged, slightly curved and limp. It is named after the wife of former President Manuel L. Quezon. It was first found in 1915 in the vicinity of Mount Makiling as a spontaneous mutant of the species Mussaenda philippica. It has been utilized as one of the parents in the development of the mussaenda hybrids.
