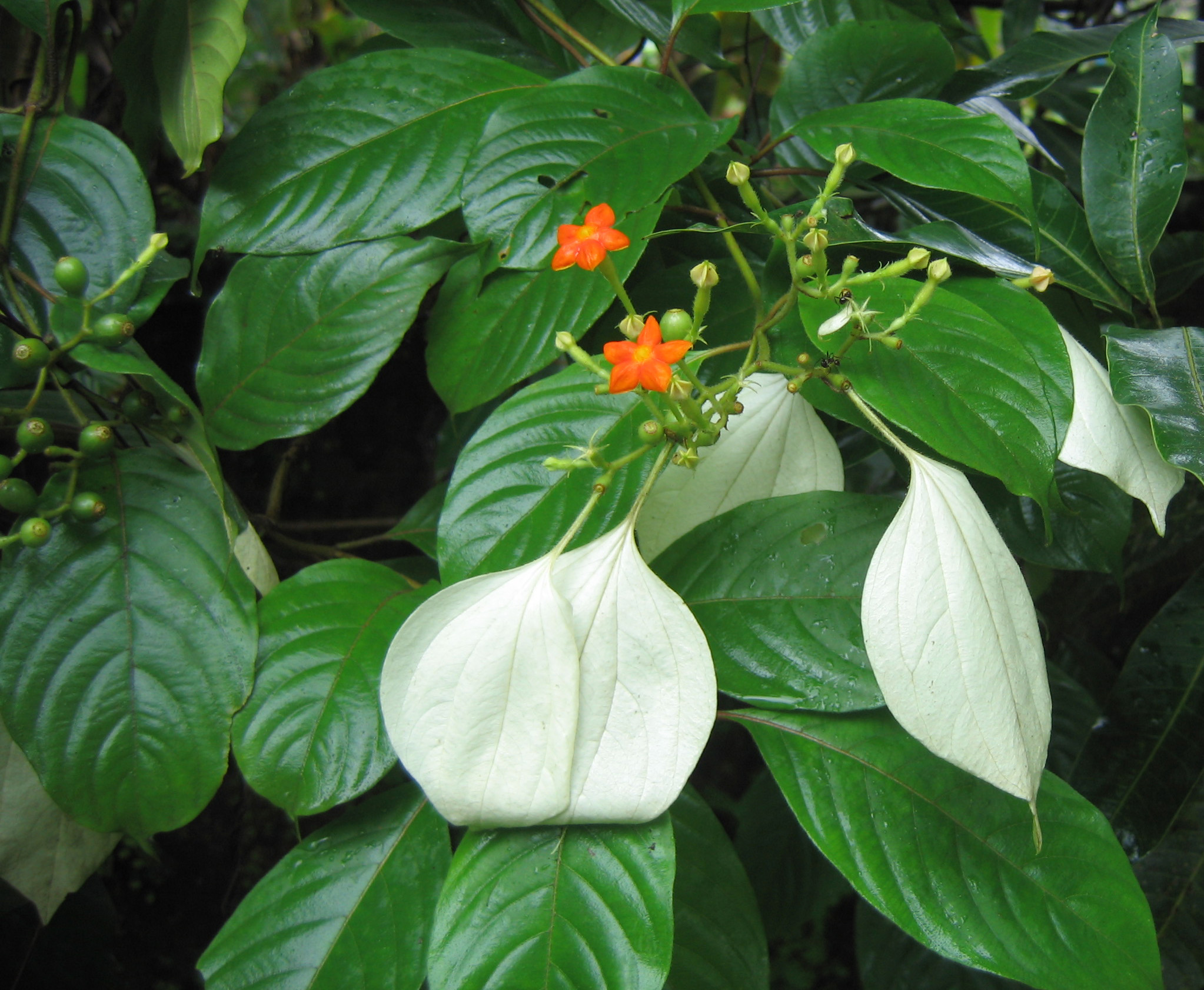
- Mussaenda frondosa

Scientific classification
- Kingdom: Plantae
- Clade: Tracheophytes
- Clade: Angiosperms
- Clade: Eudicots
- Clade: Asterids
- Order: Gentianales
- Family: Rubiaceae
- Subfamily: Ixoroideae
- Tribe: Mussaendeae
- Genus: Mussaenda; L.

Synonyms
- Aphaenandra Miq. (1857); Asemanthia Ridl. (1940); Belilla Adans. (1763); Menestoria DC. (1830); Spallanzania DC. (1830)

= Mussaenda =

Genus of flowering plants

Mussaenda is a genus of flowering plants in the family Rubiaceae. They are native to the African and Asian tropics and subtropics. Several species are cultivated as ornamental plants.

== Species ==
Mussaenda includes the following species:

- Mussaenda acuminata Blume (1826)
- Mussaenda acuminatissima Merr. (1920 publ. 1921)
- Mussaenda aestuarii K.Schum. (1905)
- Mussaenda afzelii G.Don (1834)
- Mussaenda afzelioides Wernham (1913)
- Mussaenda albiflora Merr., Philipp. J. Sci. (1910)
- Mussaenda angustisepala Ridl. (1923)
- Mussaenda anisophylla S.Vidal (1885)
- Mussaenda anomala H.L.Li (1943)
- Mussaenda antiloga Chun & W.C.Ko (1974)
- Mussaenda aptera Pit. (1923)
- Mussaenda arcuata Poir. (1797)
- Mussaenda attenuifolia Elmer (1913)
- Mussaenda bammleri Valeton (1925)
- Mussaenda benguetensis Elmer (1906)
- Mussaenda bevanii F.Muell. (Nov. 1887)
- Mussaenda bityensis Wernham (1919)
- Mussaenda bodenii Wernham, Trans. Linn. Soc. London (1916)
- Mussaenda bonii Pit. (1923)
- Mussaenda borbonica Lapeyrere (1888)
- Mussaenda brachygyna Merr. & L.M.Perry (1944)
- Mussaenda breviloba S.Moore (1905)
- Mussaenda cambodiana Pierre ex Pit. (1923)
- Mussaenda caudatiloba D.Fang (2002)
- Mussaenda cavaleriei H.Lév. (1914)
- Mussaenda celebica Ridl. (1940)
- Mussaenda chevalieri Pit. (1923)
- Mussaenda chinensis Lour. (1790)
- Mussaenda chingii C.Y.Wu ex H.H.Hsue & H.Wu (1986)
- Mussaenda chippii Wernham (1913)
- Mussaenda chlorantha Merr., Philipp. J. Sci. (1913)
- Mussaenda chrysotricha Valeton (1925)
- Mussaenda conopharyngiifolia Stapf, J. Linn. Soc. (1905)
- Mussaenda cordifolia Wall. ex G.Don (1834)
- Mussaenda corymbosa Roxb. (1824)
- Mussaenda cuspidata Geddes (1927)
- Mussaenda cylindrocarpa Burck (1883)
- Mussaenda dasyphylla Miq. (1869)
- Mussaenda dawei Hutch. (1922)
- Mussaenda debeauxii Wernham (1916)
- Mussaenda decipiens H.Li (1980)
- Mussaenda densiflora H.L.Li (1943)
- Mussaenda dinhensis Pierre ex Pit. (1923)
- Mussaenda divaricata Hutch. (1916)
- Mussaenda dolichocarpa (Lauterb. & K.Schum.) Rech., Denkschr. Kaiserl. Akad. Wiss. (1913)
- Mussaenda dranensis Wernham (1921)
- Mussaenda elegans Schumach. & Thonn. (1827)
- Mussaenda elliptica Hutch. (1916)
- Mussaenda elmeri Merr. (1929)
- Mussaenda emeiensis Z.Y.Zhu & S.J.Zhu, Bull. Bot. Res. (2008)
- Mussaenda epiphytica Cheek (2009)
- Mussaenda erosa Champ. ex Benth. (1852)
- Mussaenda erythrophylla Schumach. & Thonn. (1827)
- Mussaenda ferrea Geddes (1927)
- Mussaenda ferruginea K.Schum. (1889)
- Mussaenda fissibractea Merr. (1937)
- Mussaenda forbesii Wernham ex S.Moore (1923)
- Mussaenda forsteniana Miq. (1869)
- Mussaenda frondosa L. (1753)
- Mussaenda garrettii Craib (1931)
- Mussaenda glabra Vahl (1794)
- Mussaenda glabrata (Hook.f.) Hutch. ex Gamble (1921)
- Mussaenda gossweileri Wernham (1916)
- Mussaenda grandiflora Benth. (1849)
- Mussaenda grandifolia Elmer (1906)
- Mussaenda griffithii Wight ex Hook.f. (1880)
- Mussaenda hainanensis Merr. (1935)
- Mussaenda havilandii ined..
- Mussaenda heinsioides Hiern (1877)
- Mussaenda herderscheeana Valeton (1925)
- Mussaenda hilaris Pierre ex Pit. (1923)
- Mussaenda hirsuta Ridl. (1923)
- Mussaenda hirsutissima (Hook.f.) Hutch. ex Gamble (1921)
- Mussaenda hirsutula Miq. (1861)
- Mussaenda hoaensis Pierre ex Pit. (1923)
- Mussaenda hossei Craib ex Hosseus, Beih. Bot. Centralbl. 28(2): 444, 457 (1911)
- Mussaenda incana Wall. (1824)
- Mussaenda inflata H.H.Hsue & H.Wu (1986)
- Mussaenda intuspilosa Jayaw. (1963)
- Mussaenda isertiana DC. (1830)
- Mussaenda johannis-winkleri Merr. (1937)
- Mussaenda kajewskii Merr. & L.M.Perry (1944)
- Mussaenda kanehirae Merr. & L.M.Perry (1944)
- Mussaenda keenanii Hook.f. (1880)
- Mussaenda kerrii Craib (1911)
- Mussaenda kingdon-wardii Jayaw. (1965)
- Mussaenda kintaensis King ex Stapf, Trans. Linn. Soc. London (1894)
- Mussaenda kwangsiensis H.L.Li (1943)
- Mussaenda kwangtungensis H.L.Li (1944)
- Mussaenda lanata C.B.Rob., Philipp. J. Sci. (1911)
- Mussaenda lancifolia K.Krause (1920)
- Mussaenda lancipetala X.F.Deng & D.X.Zhang (2008)
- Mussaenda landolphioides Wernham (1913)
- Mussaenda lanuginosa Ridl. (1940)
- Mussaenda laxa (Hook.f.) Hutch. ex Gamble (1921)
- Mussaenda laxiflora Hutch. (1916)
- Mussaenda leptantha Wernham (1919)
- Mussaenda leucophylla E.M.A.Petit (1955)
- Mussaenda leucova Gilli (1979 publ. 1980)
- Mussaenda linderi Hutch. & Dalziel (1931)
- Mussaenda lobbii (Ridl.) ined..
- Mussaenda longipetala H.L.Li (1943)
- Mussaenda longisepala Geddes (1927)
- Mussaenda longituba Valeton (1907)
- Mussaenda lotungensis Chun & W.C.Ko (1974)
- Mussaenda macrantha Valeton (1911)
- Mussaenda macrophylla Wall. (1824)
- Mussaenda macrophylla f. grandisepala Jayaw. (1963)
- Mussaenda magallanensis Elmer (1911)
- Mussaenda maingayi (Hook.f.) Hemsl. ex B.D.Jacks., Index Kew. (1896)
- Mussaenda malaccensis Ridl. (1923)
- Mussaenda malacotricha Merr. & L.M.Perry (1944)
- Mussaenda membranacea King, J. Asiat. Soc. Bengal, Pt. 2 (1903)
- Mussaenda membranifolia Merr. (1923)
- Mussaenda microdonta Wernham (1913)
- Mussaenda milleri Elmer (1939)
- Mussaenda mollis Geddes (1927)
- Mussaenda mollissima C.Y.Wu ex H.H.Hsue & H.Wu (1986)
- Mussaenda monticola K.Krause (1912)
- Mussaenda motleyi Ridl. (1940)
- Mussaenda multibracteata Merr., Philipp. J. Sci. (1916)
- Mussaenda multinervis C.Y.Wu ex H.H.Hsue & H.Wu (1986)
- Mussaenda nannanii Wernham (1918)
- Mussaenda nervosa Elmer (1911)
- Mussaenda nicobarica Shimpale, S.R.Yadav & Babu (2009)
- Mussaenda nijensis R.D.Good (1926)
- Mussaenda nivea A.Chev. ex Hutch. & Dalziel (1931)
- Mussaenda oblonga King, J. Asiat. Soc. Bengal, Pt. 2 (1903)
- Mussaenda oreadum Wernham, Trans. Linn. Soc. London (1916)
- Mussaenda ornata S.Moore (1927)
- Mussaenda ovata Merr. & L.M.Perry (1944)
- Mussaenda palawanensis Merr., Philipp. J. Sci. (1915)
- Mussaenda paludosa E.M.A.Petit (1955)
- Mussaenda parryorum C.E.C.Fisch. (1928)
- Mussaenda parviflora Miq. (1867)
- Mussaenda parvifolia Valeton (1907)
- Mussaenda philippica A.Rich. (1830)
- Mussaenda philippinensis Merr., Philipp. J. Sci. (1908)
- Mussaenda pilosissima Valeton (1925)
- Mussaenda pinatubensis Elmer (1934)
- Mussaenda pingbianensis C.Y.Wu ex H.H.Hsue & H.Wu (1986)
- Mussaenda pluviatilis S.Moore (1927)
- Mussaenda polita Hiern (1877)
- Mussaenda polyneura King, J. Asiat. Soc. Bengal, Pt. 2 (1903)
- Mussaenda procera F.M.Bailey (1900)
- Mussaenda pubescens Dryand. (1810)
- Mussaenda pullei Valeton (1911)
- Mussaenda purpurascens Ridl. (1912)
- Mussaenda raiateensis J.W.Moore (1933)
- Mussaenda reinwardtiana Miq. (1857)
- Mussaenda ridleyana Wernham, Trans. Linn. Soc. London (1916)
- Mussaenda rivularis Welw. ex Hiern (1898)
- Mussaenda roxburghii Hook.f. (1880)
- Mussaenda rufa A.Rich. (1830)
- Mussaenda rufescens Valeton (1911)
- Mussaenda rufinervia Miq. (1857)
- Mussaenda saigonensis Pierre ex Pit. (1923)
- Mussaenda samana Jayaw. (1963)
- Mussaenda sandakana Govaerts (2008)
- Mussaenda sanderiana Ridl. (1909)
- Mussaenda scandens Elmer (1911)
- Mussaenda scratchleyi Wernham (1918)
- Mussaenda sericea Blume (1826)
- Mussaenda sessilifolia Hutch. (1916)
- Mussaenda setosa Merr., Philipp. J. Sci. (1915)
- Mussaenda shikokiana Makino (1904)
- Mussaenda simpliciloba Hand.-Mazz., Anz. Akad. Wiss. Wien (1925)
- Mussaenda soyauxii Büttner (1889)
- Mussaenda spectabilis Ridl. (1918)
- Mussaenda squiresii Merr. (1938)
- Mussaenda subsessilis Pierre ex Pit. (1923)
- Mussaenda sutepensis Hosseus (1911)
- Mussaenda tenuiflora Benth. (1849)
- Mussaenda teysmanniana Miq. (1857)
- Mussaenda theifera Pierre ex Carr. (1883)
- Mussaenda thorelii Pit. (1923)
- Mussaenda tomentosa Wall. ex G.Don (1834)
- Mussaenda treutleri Stapf (1909)
- Mussaenda tristigmatica Cummins (1898)
- Mussaenda uniflora Wall. ex G.Don
- Mussaenda ustii Alejandro (2008)
- Mussaenda utakwae Wernham, Trans. Linn. Soc. London (1916)
- Mussaenda variolosa Wall. ex G.Don (1834)
- Mussaenda vidalii Elmer (1911)
- Mussaenda villosa Wall. ex G.Don (1834)
- Mussaenda viridiflora Alejandro (2008)
- Mussaenda wallichii G.Don (1834)
- Mussaenda whitei S.Moore (1922)
- Mussaenda wilsonii Hutch. (1916)
- Mussaenda wrayi King, J. Asiat. Soc. Bengal, Pt. 2 (1903)
- Mussaenda zenkeri Wernham (1913)
- Mussaenda zollingeriana Klotzsch (1853)

== Gallery ==
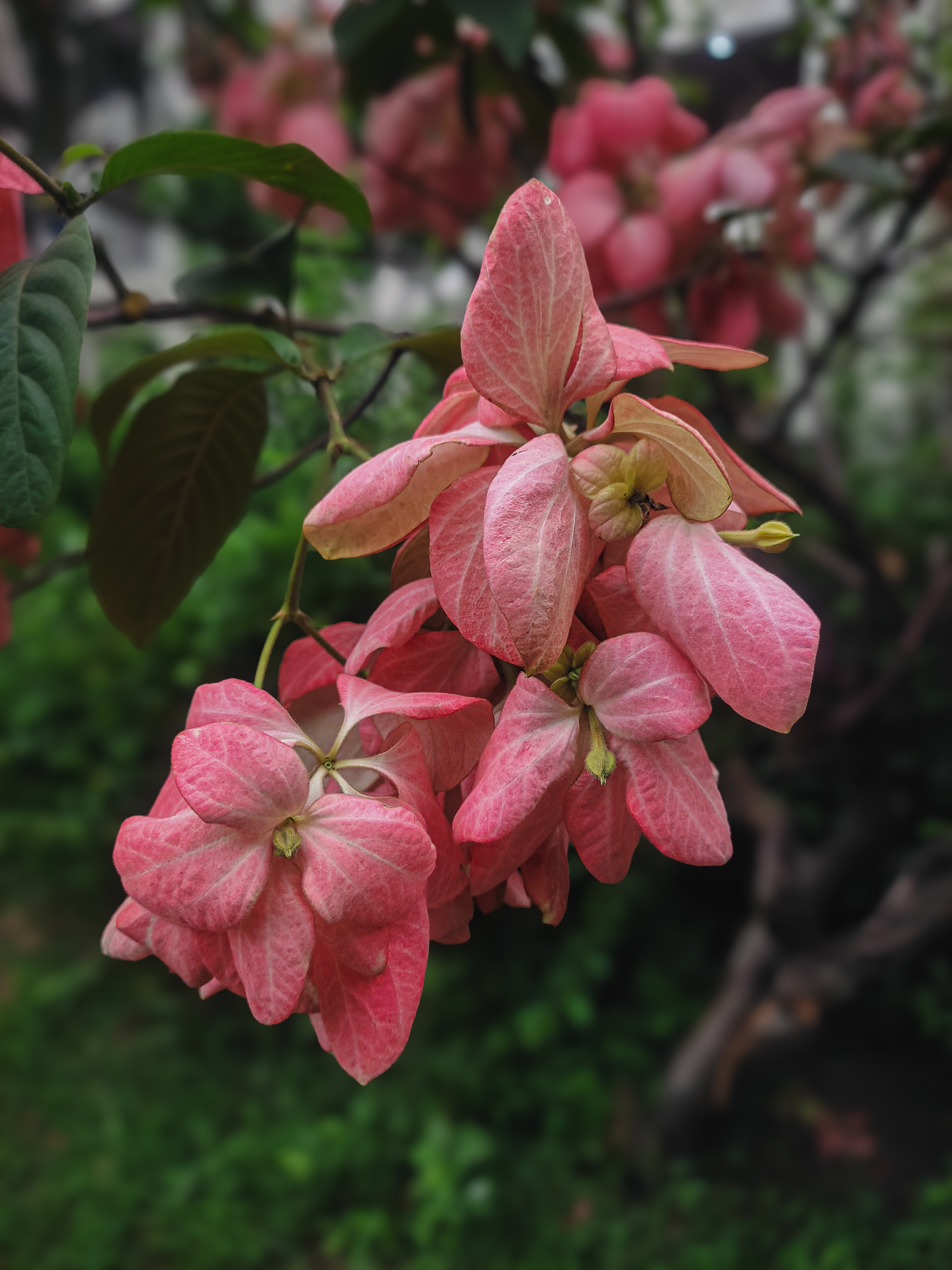
Mussaenda philippica in Bangladesh

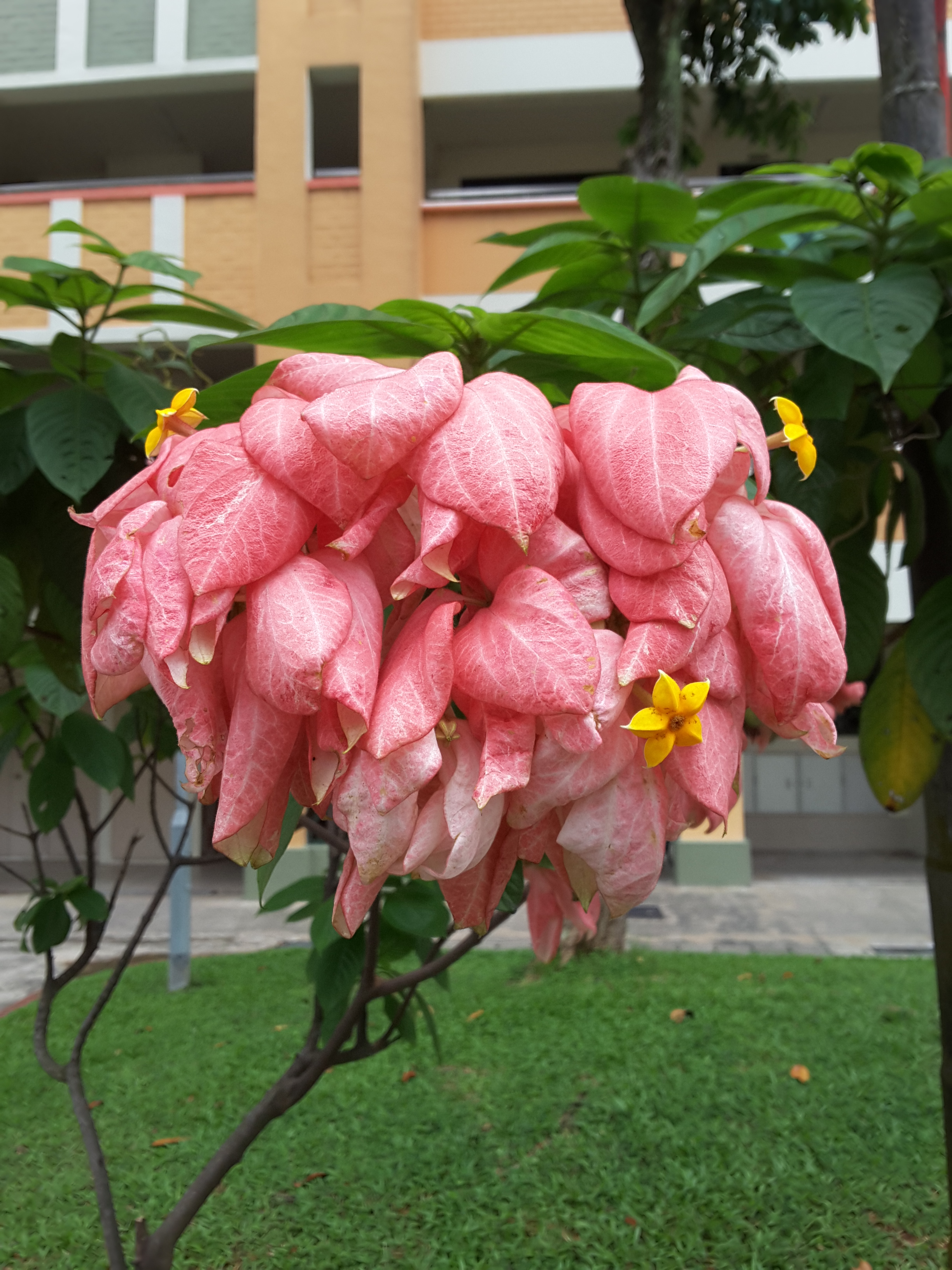
Mussaenda philippica in Singapore

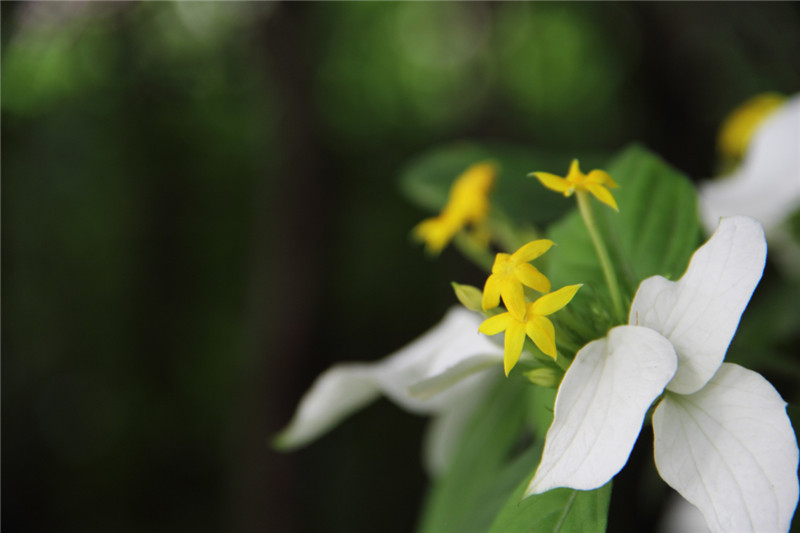
Mussaenda pubescens in China

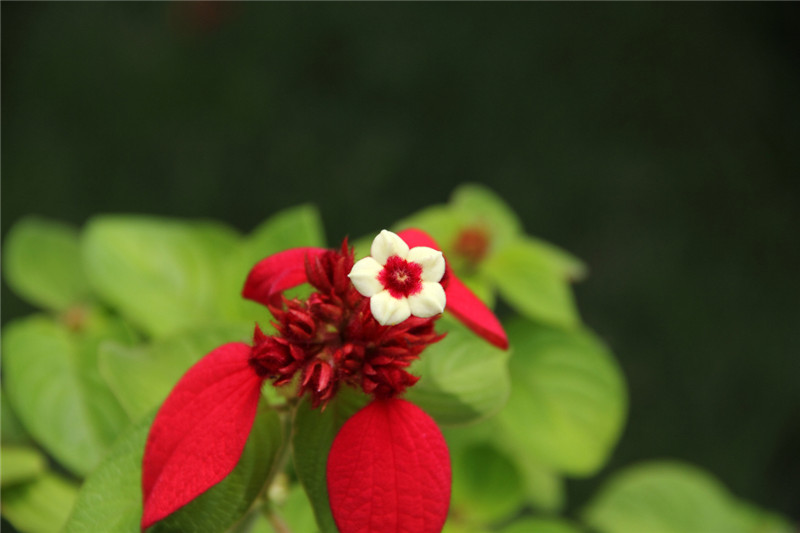
Mussaenda erythrophylla in China

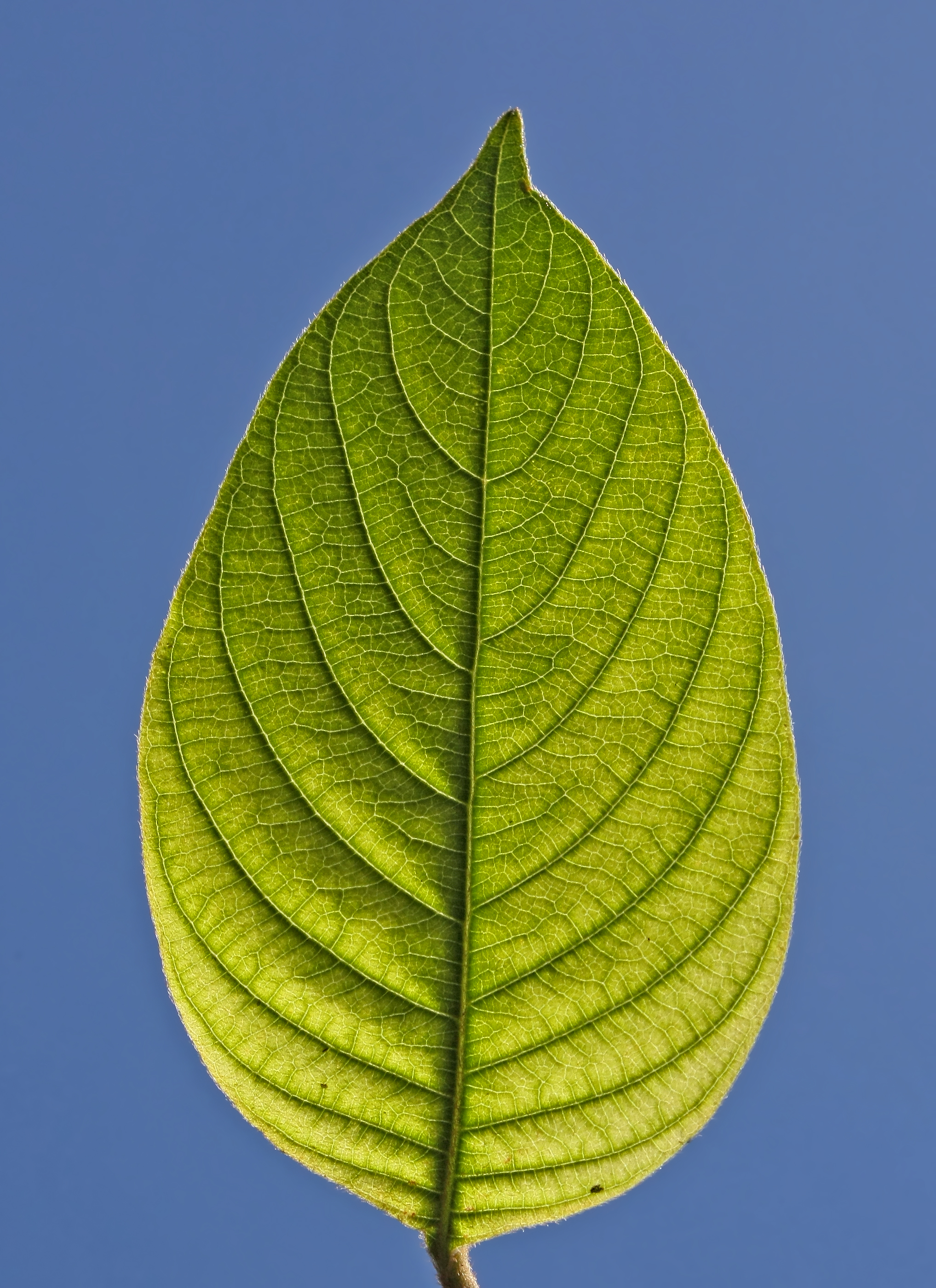
Leaf of Mussaenda philippica
