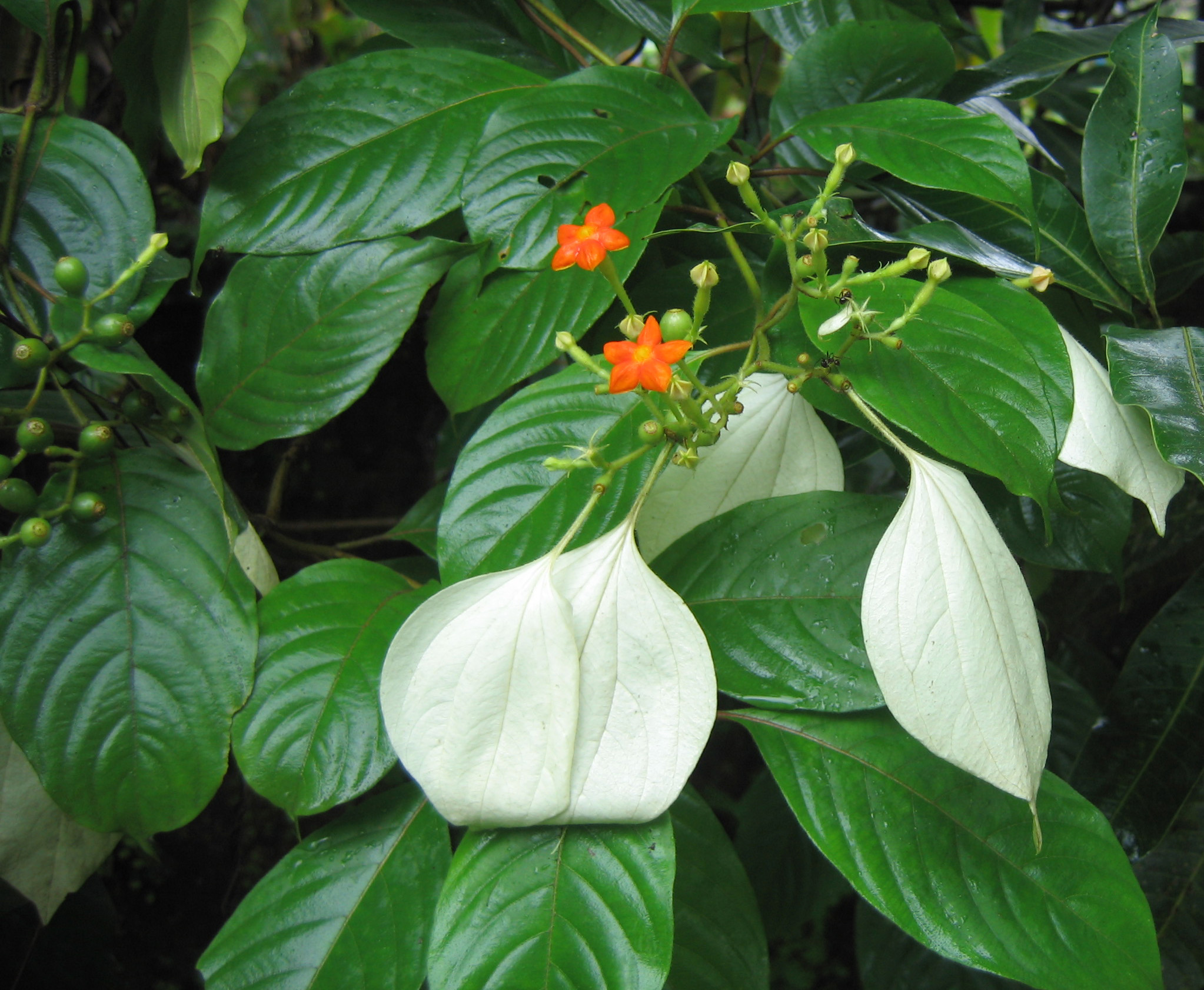

Scientific classification
- Kingdom: Plantae
- Clade: Tracheophytes
- Clade: Angiosperms
- Clade: Eudicots
- Clade: Asterids
- Order: Gentianales
- Family: Rubiaceae
- Genus: Mussaenda
- Species: M. frondosa

Binomial name
- Mussaenda frondosa L.

Synonyms
- Gardenia frondosa (L.) Lam.; Mussaenda belilla Buch.-Ham.; Mussaenda dovinia Buch.-Ham.; Mussaenda flavescens Buch.-Ham.; Mussaenda formosa L. nom. illeg.; Mussaenda fruticosa L.; Mussaenda ingrata Wall. ex Hook.f.; Mussaenda macrophylla Kurz nom. illeg.; Mussaenda sumatrensis B.Heyne ex Roth; Mussaenda tomentosa Wight ex Hook.f. nom. inval.; Mussaenda villosa Schltdl. ex Hook.f. nom. illeg.

= Mussaenda frondosa =

Species of shrub

Mussaenda frondosa, commonly known as the wild mussaenda or dhobi tree, is a plant of family Rubiaceae. It is a shrub that grows to about 1.5–2 m (4 ft 11 in – 6 ft 7 in) tall. Like most other Mussaenda species, they have a bract beneath their flowers, which in this species is white in colour.

== Description ==
The shrub may also grow as a scandent climber. The flowers are clusters of orange-yellow tubular flowers with one of their five sepals enlarged into a white petal-like form, set among pale green, oval leaves; berries follow the bloom. The erect, branching stem has a shrubby crown.

== Distribution ==
Mussaenda frondosa is native to India, Nepal, Sri Lanka, Cambodia, Vietnam, Malaysia and Indonesia. It is found on Nilgiri slopes to elevations of 6,000 ft (1,800 m). Justus Carl Hasskarl recorded its presence in recently cleared land in Java.

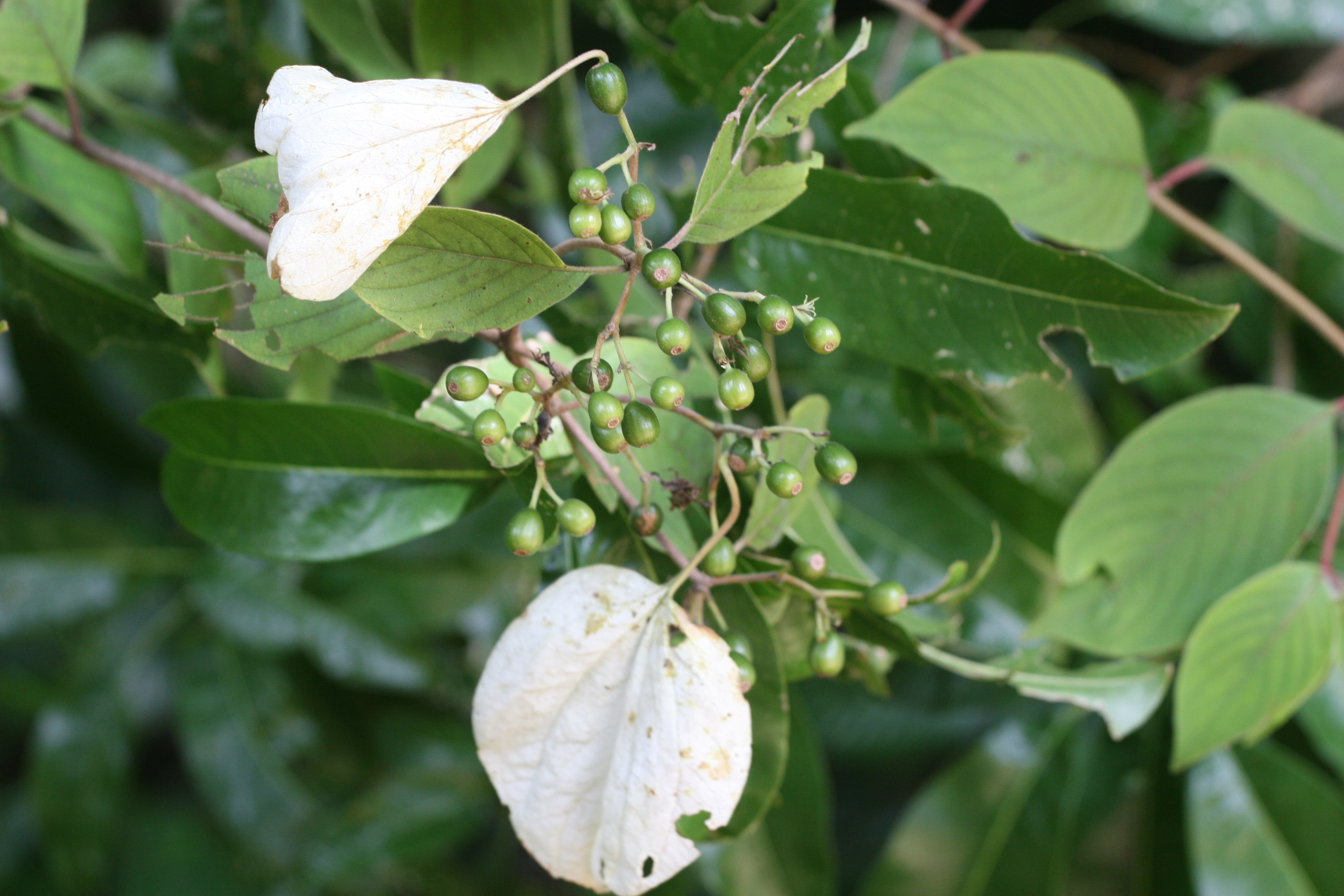
Fruit
