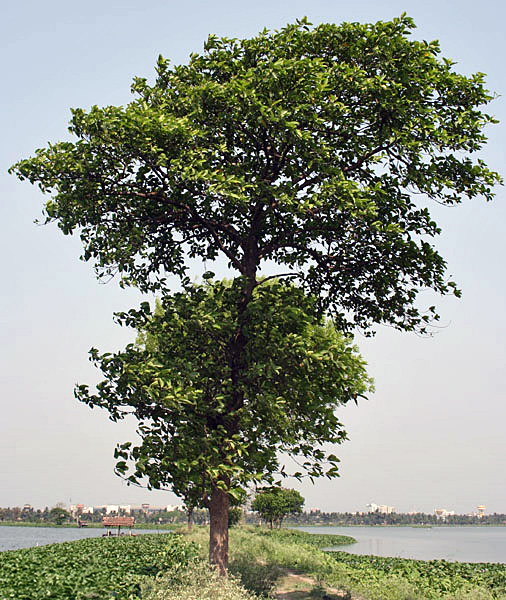
- Neolamarckia cadamba
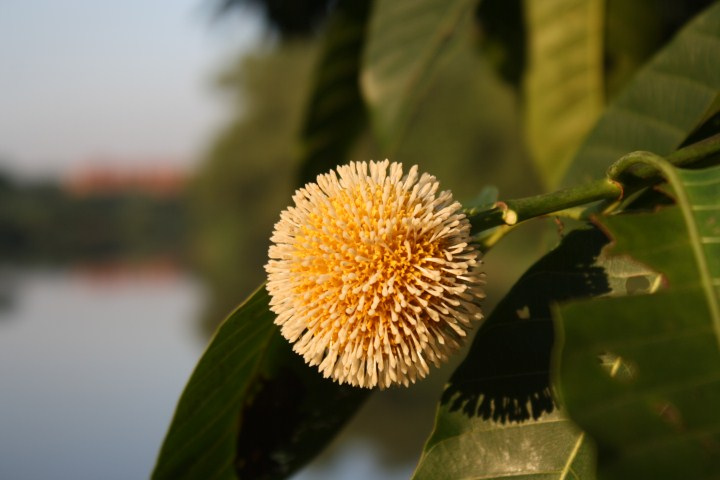
- Neolamarckia cadamba

Scientific classification
- Kingdom: Plantae
- Clade: Tracheophytes
- Clade: Angiosperms
- Clade: Eudicots
- Clade: Asterids
- Order: Gentianales
- Family: Rubiaceae
- Subfamily: Cinchonoideae
- Tribe: Naucleeae
- Genus: Neolamarckia

Synonyms
- Anthocephalus auct. non A. Rich.

= Neolamarckia =

Genus of plants

Neolamarckia is a genus with one or two species of trees native to the Old World tropics. It has often been confused with other genera, particularly Nauclea and Neonauclea to such an extent that descriptions of Neolamarckia may state incorrectly that its fruit is a capsule.

== Description ==
The inflorescences are spherical, containing many small flowers. The fruit is a drupe that sometimes separates into four sections. The trees lack spines and have leaves arranged in opposite pairs, with triangular stipules between the leaf stalks that fall off early. Individual flowers are bisexual, with five stamens and a yellow to white corolla that forms a narrow tube opening into five spreading lobes.

== Species ==
- Neolamarckia cadamba, native to east Asia, south Asia, and southeast Asia
- Neolamarckia macrophylla, native to south Asia, and southeast Asia

== Botanical nomenclature ==
The genus name was created to replace Anthocephalus, which had been based on two unrelated herbarium specimens, one of which was mislabelled. Consequently, the true Anthocephalus is a synonym of the genus Breonia, and a new name was needed for the trees that had been generally known by the incorrect name.
