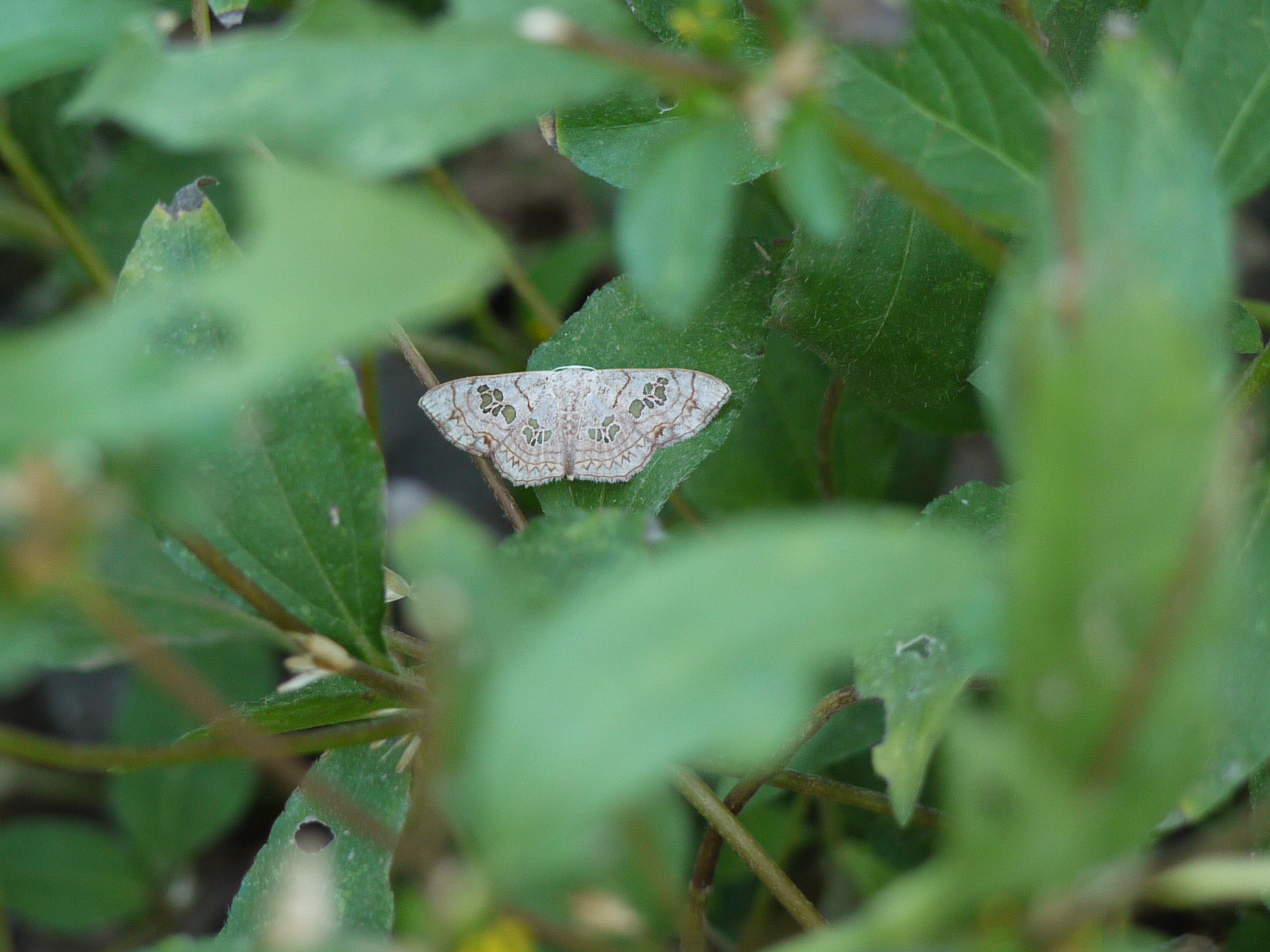

Scientific classification
- Kingdom: Animalia
- Phylum: Arthropoda
- Class: Insecta
- Order: Lepidoptera
- Family: Geometridae
- Genus: Scopula
- Species: S. cuneilinea

Binomial name
- Scopula cuneilinea (Walker, [1863])

Synonyms
- Geometra cuneilinea Walker, [1863]; Antitrygodes cuneilinea

= Scopula cuneilinea =

Species of geometer moth in subfamily Sterrhinae

Scopula cuneilinea is a moth of the family Geometridae. It is found in Asia, including India, Pakistan, Bangladesh and Thailand.

Adults are attracted to the eyes of ox and other cattle for their lachrymal secretion.

The larvae are serious defoliators of Anthocephalus cadamba, but have also been recorded feeding on Adina species.
