= Uncaria acida =

Scientific classification
- Kingdom: Plantae
- Clade: Tracheophytes
- Clade: Angiosperms
- Clade: Eudicots
- Clade: Asterids
- Order: Gentianales
- Family: Rubiaceae
- Subfamily: Cinchonoideae
- Tribe: Naucleeae
- Genus: Uncaria
- Species: U. acida

Binomial name
- Uncaria acida (Hunter) Roxb.

Synonyms
- Uruparia acida (Hunter) Kuntze; Ourouparia acida (Hunter) Baill. Nauclea acida Hunter

Species of plant

Uncaria acida is a species of liana in the family Rubiaceae.

== Subspecies ==
The Catalogue of Life lists:

- U. acida var. acida - Indo-China to W. & C. Malesia
- U. acida var. papuana - Borneo, New Guinea
