= Adina fagifolia =

Scientific classification
- Kingdom: Plantae
- Clade: Tracheophytes
- Clade: Angiosperms
- Clade: Eudicots
- Clade: Asterids
- Order: Gentianales
- Family: Rubiaceae
- Subfamily: Cinchonoideae
- Tribe: Naucleeae
- Genus: Adina
- Species: A. fagifolia

Binomial name
- Adina fagifolia (Teijsm. & Binn. ex Havil.) Valeton ex Merr. (1917)

Synonyms
- Adinauclea fagifolia (Teijsm. & Binn. ex Havil.) Ridsdale (1978); Nauclea fagifolia Teijsm. & Binn. ex Havil. (1897); Neonauclea fagifolia (Teijsm. & Binn. ex Havil.) Merr. (1915)

Genus of plants

Adina fagifolia is a species of flowering plant in the family Rubiaceae. It is a tree native to Sulawesi and the Moluccas.
