= Adina racemosa =

Scientific classification
- Kingdom: Plantae
- Clade: Embryophytes
- Clade: Tracheophytes
- Clade: Spermatophytes
- Clade: Angiosperms
- Clade: Eudicots
- Clade: Asterids
- Order: Gentianales
- Family: Rubiaceae
- Genus: Adina
- Species: A. racemosa

Binomial name
- Adina racemosa (Siebold & Zucc.) Ridsdale (1978)

Synonyms
- Cornus esquirolii H.Lév. (1914); Adina asperula Hand.-Mazz. (1921); Adina indivisa Lace (1915); Adina mollifolia Hutch. (1916); Adina nobilis E.T.Geddes (1928); Nauclea racemosa Siebold & Zucc. (1846); Nauclea taiwaniana Hayata (1911); Nauclea transversa Hayata (1911); Sinoadina racemosa (Siebold & Zucc.) Ridsdale (1978)

Genus of plants

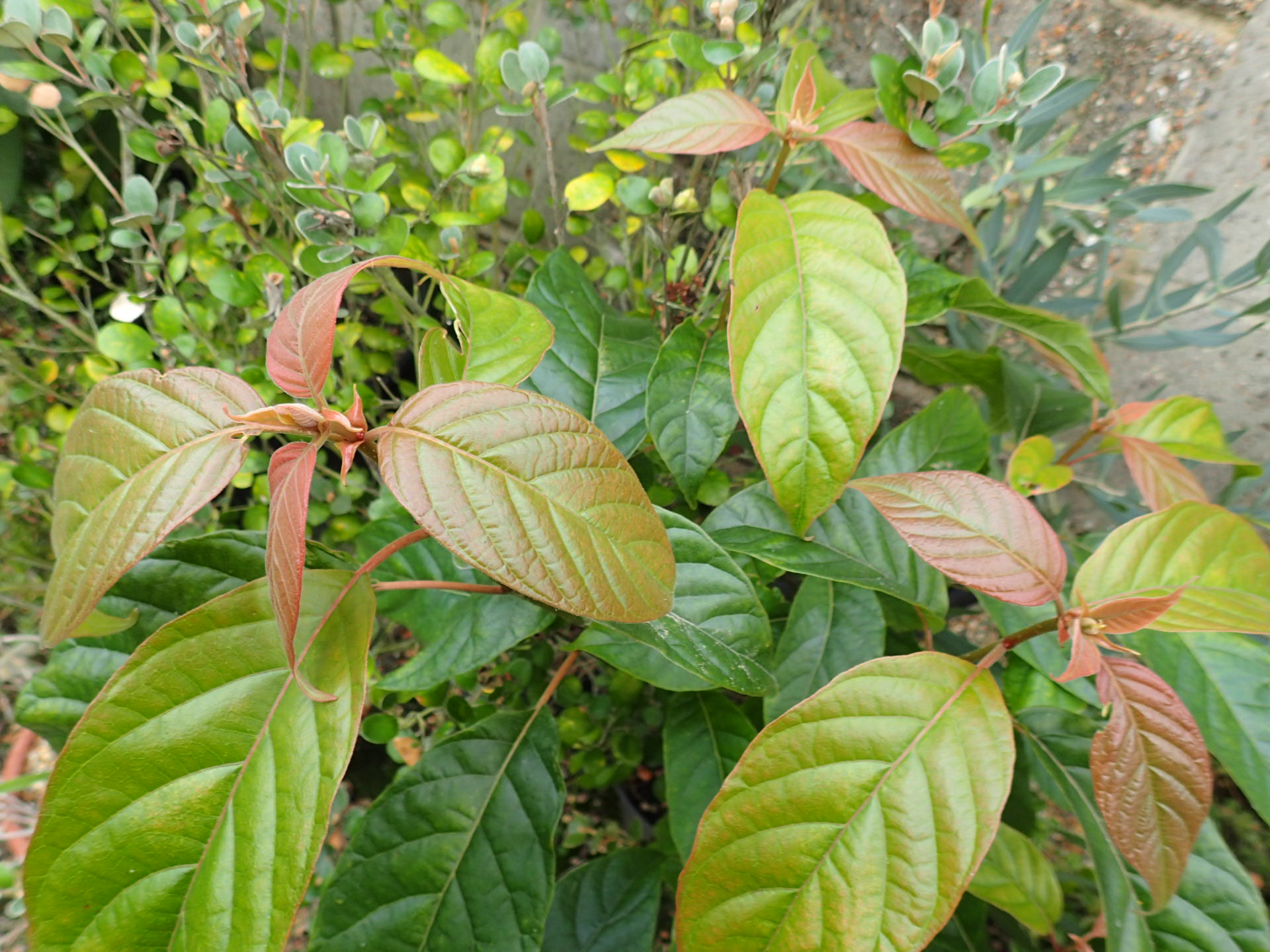
Adina racemosa

Adina racemosa is a species of flowering plant belonging to the family Rubiaceae. It is a tree native to northern Myanmar and Thailand, southern China, Taiwan, the Ryukyu Islands, and Japan.
