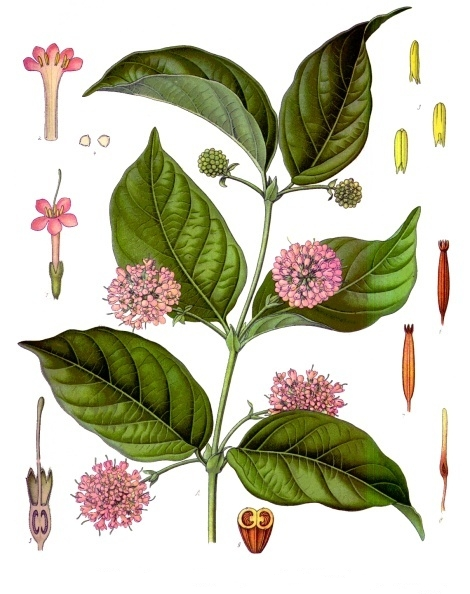
- Uncaria gambir

Scientific classification
- Kingdom: Plantae
- Clade: Embryophytes
- Clade: Tracheophytes
- Clade: Angiosperms
- Clade: Eudicots
- Clade: Asterids
- Order: Gentianales
- Family: Rubiaceae
- Subfamily: Cinchonoideae
- Tribe: Naucleeae
- Genus: Uncaria; Schreber

Type species
- Uncaria guianensis (Aublet) J.F. Gmelin

Species
- ~40 species. See text

= Uncaria =

Genus of flowering plants

Uncaria is a genus of flowering plants in the family Rubiaceae. It has about 40 species. Their distribution is pantropical, with most species native to tropical Asia, three from Africa and the Mediterranean and two from the neotropics. They are known colloquially as gambier, cat's claw or uña de gato. The latter two names are shared with several other plants. The type species for the genus is Uncaria guianensis.

Indonesian Gambier (U. gambir) is a large tropical vine with leaves typical of the genus, being opposite and about 10 cm (3.9 in) long. The South American U. tomentosa is called Uña de Gato. Uncaria sinensis is common in China.

Uncaria was named in 1789 by Johann von Schreber in his Genera Plantarum edition 8[a] (not to be confused with books of the same title by Linnaeus, Jussieu, and others). The genus name is derived from the Latin word uncus, meaning "a hook". It refers to the hooks, formed from reduced branches, that Uncaria vines use to cling to other vegetation.

Uncaria is a member of the tribe Naucleeae, but its position within that tribe remains unresolved.

== Description ==
Woody lianas; climbing by hooks formed from reduced, modified branches. Stipules entire or bifid. Inflorescences are compact heads at the ends of horizontal, very reduced branches. Corolla lobes without appendages. Seeds with a long wing at each end, the lower wing deeply bifid.

== Species ==
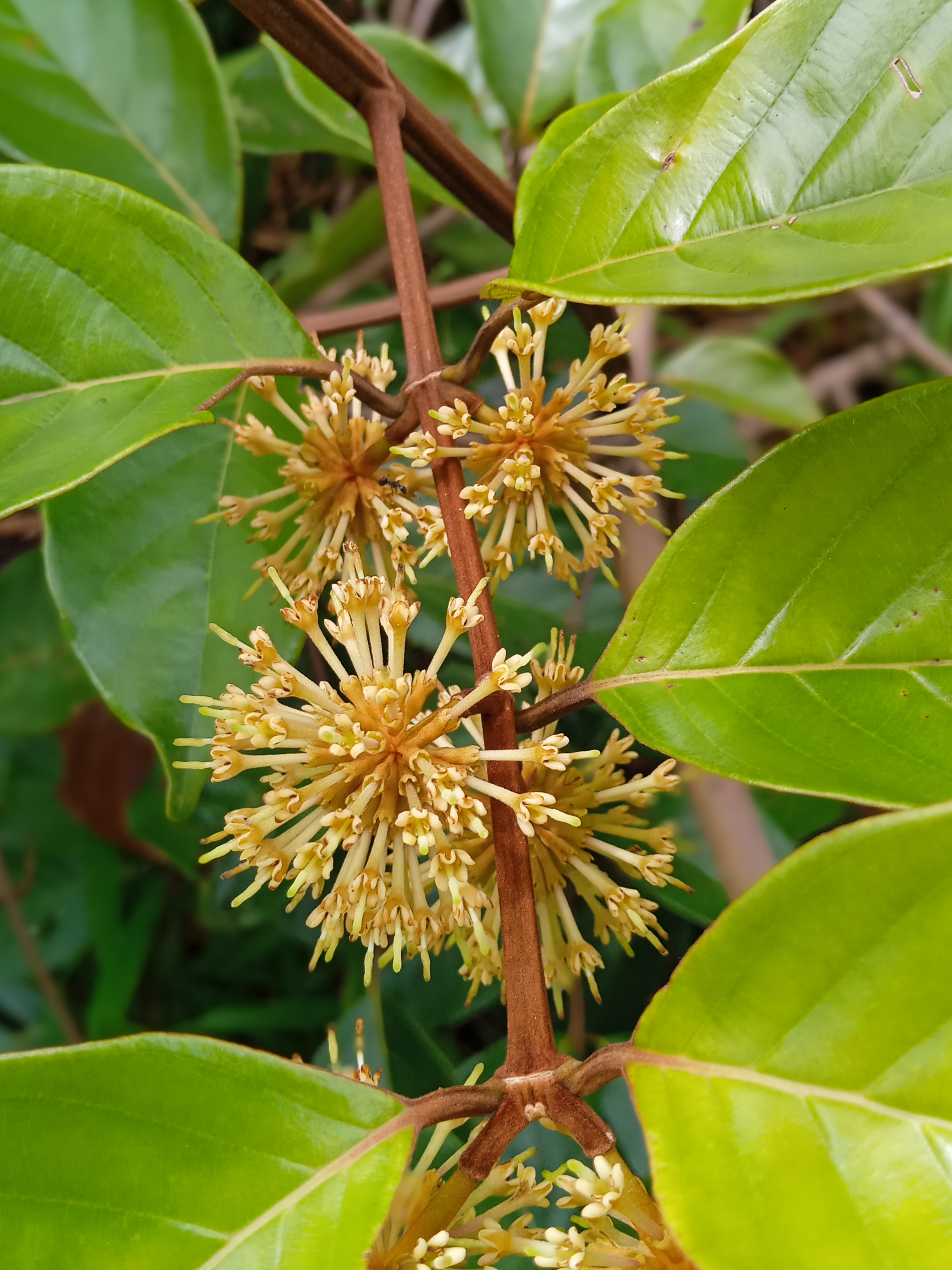
U. hirsuta

As of March 2023, Plants of the World Online accepted the following species:

- Uncaria acida (W.Hunter) Roxb.
- Uncaria africana G.Don
- Uncaria angolensis (Havil.) Welw. ex Hutch. & Dalziel
- Uncaria attenuata Korth.
- Uncaria barbata Merr.
- Uncaria bernaysii F.Muell.
- Uncaria borneensis Havil.
- Uncaria callophylla Blume ex Korth.
- Uncaria canescens Korth.
- Uncaria cordata (Lour.) Merr.
- Uncaria donisii E.M.A.Petit
- Uncaria elliptica R.Br. ex G.Don
- Uncaria gambir (W.Hunter) Roxb.
- Uncaria guianensis (Aubl.) J.F.Gmel.
- Uncaria hirsuta Havil.
- Uncaria homomalla Miq.
- Uncaria kunstleri King
- Uncaria laevigata Wall. ex G.Don
- Uncaria lancifolia Hutch.
- Uncaria lanosa Wall.
- Uncaria longiflora (Poir.) Merr.
- Uncaria macrophylla Wall.
- Uncaria nervosa Elmer
- Uncaria orientalis Guillaumin
- Uncaria ovata R.Br. ex Hook.f.
- Uncaria perrottetii (A.Rich.) Merr.
- Uncaria rhynchophylla (Miq.) Miq.
- Uncaria rhynchophylloides F.C.How
- Uncaria roxburghiana Korth.
- Uncaria scandens (Sm.) Wall.
- Uncaria schlenckerae S.Moore
- Uncaria sessilifructus Roxb.
- Uncaria sinensis (Oliv.) Havil.
- Uncaria sterrophylla Merr. & L.M.Perry
- Uncaria talbotii Wernham
- Uncaria tomentosa (Willd. ex Schult.) DC.
- Uncaria velutina Havil.

== Uses ==
Diplomat Edmund Roberts noted that, upon his visit to China in the 1830s, Chinese were using U. gambir for tanning, and noted that the U. gambir made "leather porous and rotten." He also noted that Chinese would chew it with areca nut. The plant extract contains some 150 identified phytochemicals, including catechins, proanthocyanins, and chalcone-flavan-3-ol dimers, called gambiriins. Cat's claw (U. tomentosa) and the Chinese Uncaria species are used in traditional medicine, although there is no high-quality clinical evidence they have any medicinal properties.

== Adverse effects ==
Although cat's claw appears to be safe for human use below 350 milligrams per day over 6 weeks, its adverse effects may include nausea, diarrhea, upset stomach, and an increased risk of bleeding if used with an anticoagulant drug.
