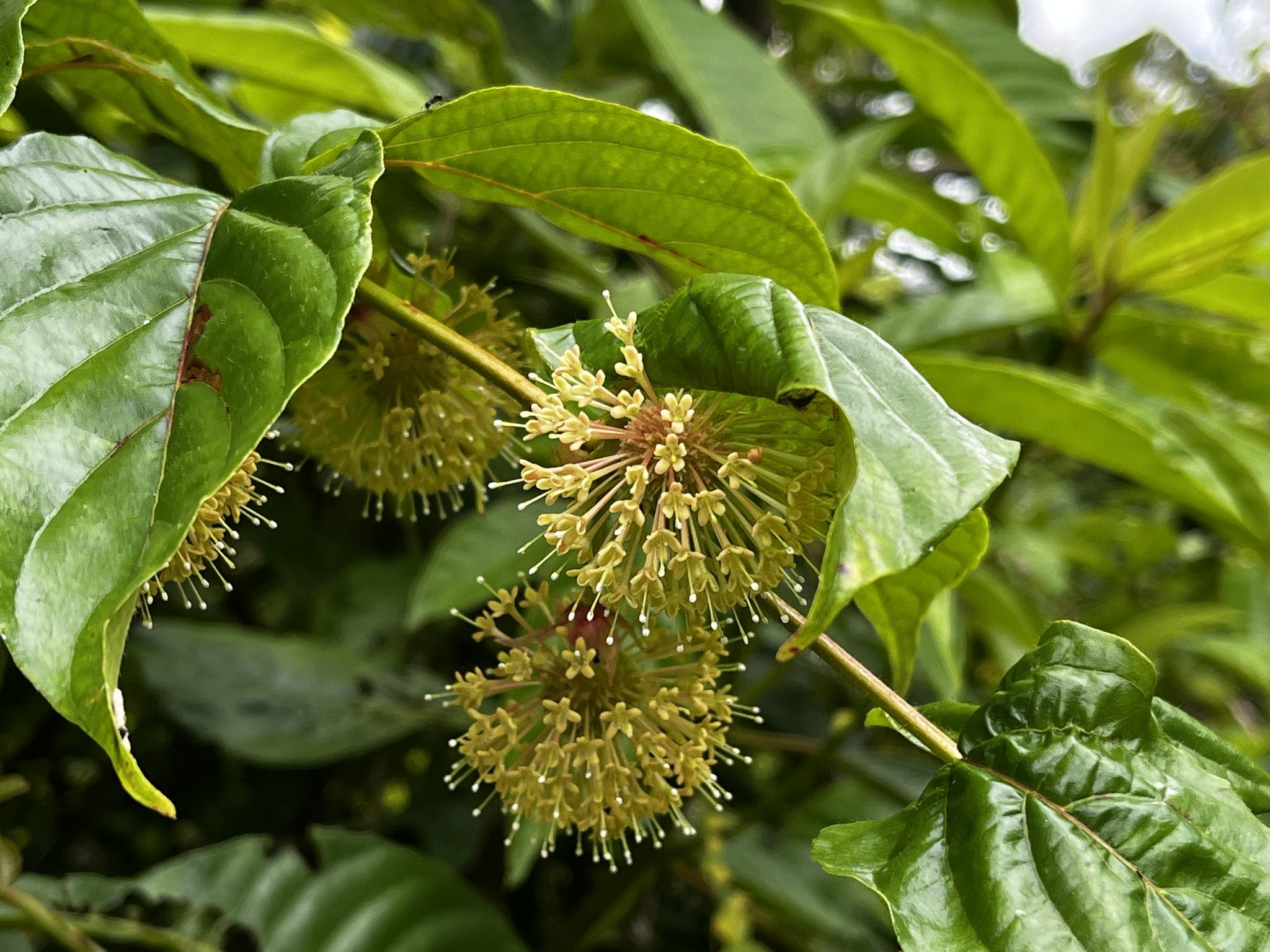
- Inflorescence

Scientific classification
- Kingdom: Plantae
- Clade: Embryophytes
- Clade: Tracheophytes
- Clade: Spermatophytes
- Clade: Angiosperms
- Clade: Eudicots
- Clade: Asterids
- Order: Gentianales
- Family: Rubiaceae
- Genus: Uncaria
- Species: U. lanosa

Binomial name
- Uncaria lanosa Wall.

Synonyms
- Uruparia lanosa (Wall.) Kuntze

= Uncaria lanosa =

Species of flowering plant

Uncaria lanosa is a species of plant in the coffee and gardenia family Rubiaceae, native to Southeast Asia, Australia and the western Pacific. It is a scrambling climber of rainforest.

== Description ==
Uncaria lanosa is a scandent shrub or vine with a stem diameter reaching up to 5 cm (2.0 in) diameter. The leaves are arranged in opposite pairs along the stems and are densely covered in soft hairs. Flowers are produced in roughly spherical umbels about 5 cm (2.0 in) diameter.

== Taxonomy ==
Six varieties and five forms are accepted by Plants of the World Online as of April 2026:

- Uncaria lanosa var. appendiculata (Benth.) Ridsdale
- Uncaria lanosa var. ferrea (Blume) Ridsdale
- Uncaria lanosa var. glabrata (Blume) Ridsdale
- Uncaria lanosa var. korrensis (Kaneh.) Ridsdale
- Uncaria lanosa var. lanosa
- Uncaria lanosa var. toppingii (Merr.) Ridsdale
- Uncaria lanosa f. glabrescens (Merr. & L.M.Perry) Ridsdale
- Uncaria lanosa f. gynogumna Ridsdale
- Uncaria lanosa f. philippinensis (Elmer) Ridsdale
- Uncaria lanosa f. setiloba (Benth.) Ridsdale
- Uncaria lanosa f. sumatrana Ridsdale

== Conservation ==
In Australia, this species is listed as least concern under the Queensland Government's Nature Conservation Act. As of April 2026, it has not been assessed by the International Union for Conservation of Nature (IUCN).
