= Adina trichotoma =

Scientific classification
- Kingdom: Plantae
- Clade: Tracheophytes
- Clade: Angiosperms
- Clade: Eudicots
- Clade: Asterids
- Order: Gentianales
- Family: Rubiaceae
- Genus: Adina
- Species: A. trichotoma

Binomial name
- Adina trichotoma (Zoll. & Moritzi) Benth. & Hook.f. ex B.D.Jacks.

Synonyms
- Ourouparia polycephala (A.Rich. ex DC.) Baill. Nauclea trichotoma Zoll. & Moritzi; Nauclea polycephala Wall. ex G.Don; Nauclea capitellata Voigt; Nauclea aralioides (Zoll. & Moritzi) Miq. Cephalanthus aralioides Zoll. & Moritzi; Adina zschokkei Elmer; Adina polycephaloides Craib; Adina polycephala var. macrophylla Adina polycephala Benth. Adina parvula Geddes; Adina aralioides (Zoll. & Moritzi) Benth. & Hook.f. ex B.D.Jacks. Metadina trichotoma (Zoll. & Moritzi) Bakh.f.

Species of plant

Adina trichotoma is a species of flowering plant in the family Rubiaceae. It was first described by Heinrich Zollinger and Alexandre Moritzi in 1846.

This tree is found throughout Indochina: in Vietnamese it is called vàng vé (sometimes gáo long).
