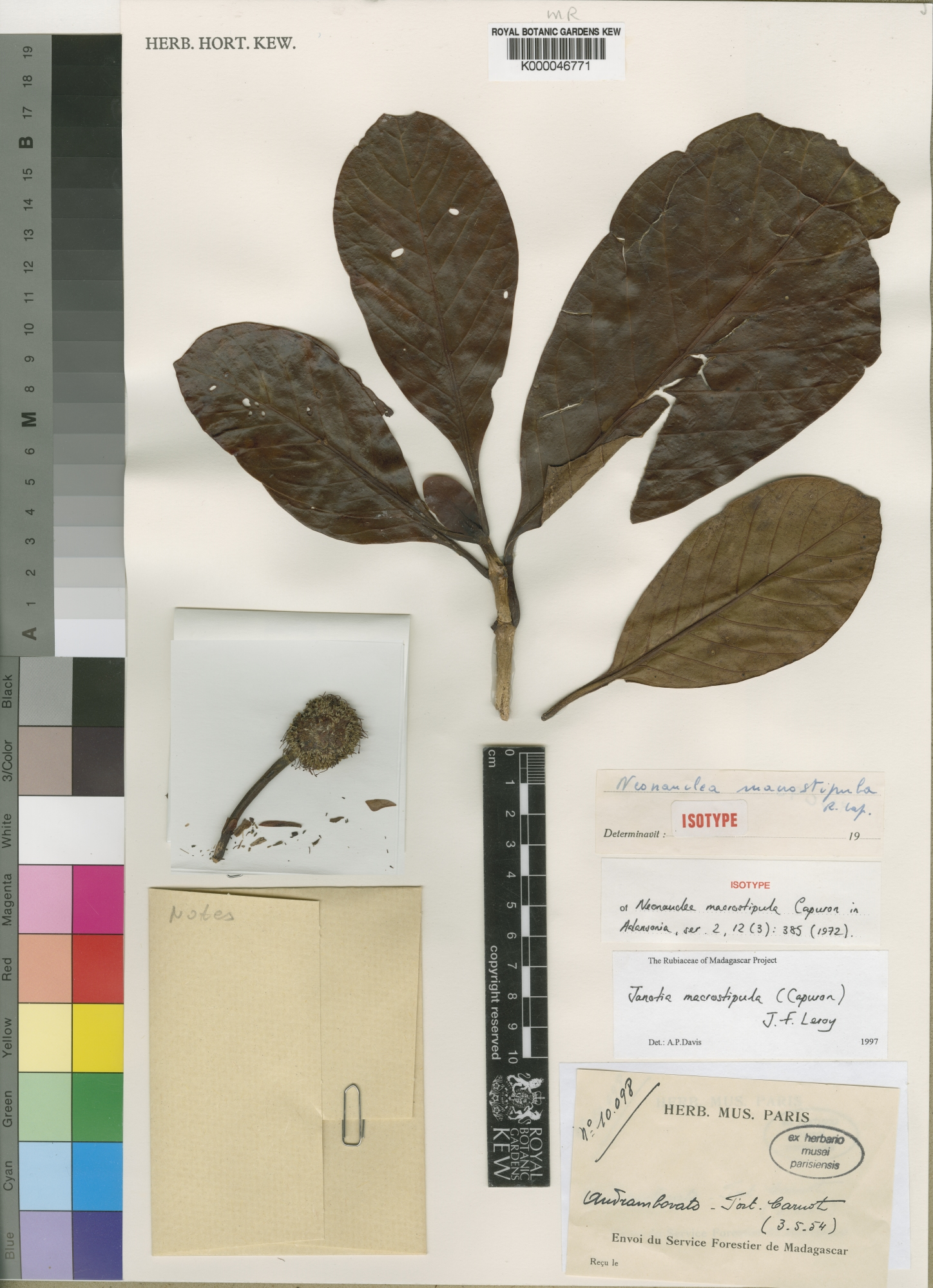

Conservation status
- Endangered (IUCN 3.1)

Scientific classification
- Kingdom: Plantae
- Clade: Tracheophytes
- Clade: Angiosperms
- Clade: Eudicots
- Clade: Asterids
- Order: Gentianales
- Family: Rubiaceae
- Subfamily: Cinchonoideae
- Tribe: Naucleeae
- Genus: Janotia; J.-F.Leroy
- Species: J. macrostipula

Binomial name
- Janotia macrostipula (Capuron) J.-F.Leroy

= Janotia =

Genus of plants

Janotia is a monotypic genus of flowering plants in the family Rubiaceae. The genus contains only one species, viz. Janotia macrostipula, which is endemic to Madagascar.
