= Uncaria perrottetii =

Scientific classification
- Kingdom: Plantae
- Clade: Tracheophytes
- Clade: Angiosperms
- Clade: Eudicots
- Clade: Asterids
- Order: Gentianales
- Family: Rubiaceae
- Genus: Uncaria
- Species: U. perrottetii

Binomial name
- Uncaria perrottetii (A.Rich.) Merr.

Species of plant

Uncaria perrottetii, known locally in the Philippines as “sungay kalabaw” (lit. “carabao’s horn”), is a species of liana in the family Rubiaceae.

It was first described in 1834 by Achille Richard as Sabicea perrottetii, and was transferred to the genus, Uncaria, by Elmer Drew Merrill in 1913.

== Traditional uses ==
In the Philippines, it is used by the indigenous Aeta people for treating hematuria, and for combatting puerperal sepsis among new mothers. This has led to a number of preliminary ethnopharmacology studies on poultices derived from the species, to investigate its possible immunostimulatory properties.

== Synonyms ==
The Catalogue of Life lists the following as synonyms of Uncaria perrottetii:

- Ourouparia perrottetii (A.Rich.) Baill.
- Sabicea perrottetii A.Rich.
- Uncaria ferrea Fern.-Vill.
- Uncaria hookeri Vidal
