= Gyrostipula =

Scientific classification
- Kingdom: Plantae
- Clade: Tracheophytes
- Clade: Angiosperms
- Clade: Eudicots
- Clade: Asterids
- Order: Gentianales
- Family: Rubiaceae
- Subfamily: Cinchonoideae
- Tribe: Naucleeae
- Genus: Gyrostipula; J.-F.Leroy

Genus of plants

Gyrostipula is a genus of flowering plants in the family Rubiaceae. The genus is found on the Comoros and Madagascar.

== Species ==
- Gyrostipula comorensis J.-F.Leroy
- Gyrostipula foveolata (Capuron) J.-F.Leroy
- Gyrostipula obtusa Eman. & Razafim.
