= Neonauclea gageana =

Conservation status
- Critically Endangered (IUCN 2.3)

Scientific classification
- Kingdom: Plantae
- Clade: Tracheophytes
- Clade: Angiosperms
- Clade: Eudicots
- Clade: Asterids
- Order: Gentianales
- Family: Rubiaceae
- Genus: Neonauclea
- Species: N. gageana

Binomial name
- Neonauclea gageana (King) Merr.

Synonyms
- Nauclea gageana King

Species of plant

Neonauclea gageana is a species of large tree in the family Rubiaceae. It is endemic to the Middle and South Andaman Islands of India where it was collected in the 19th century. It has not been recorded since.
