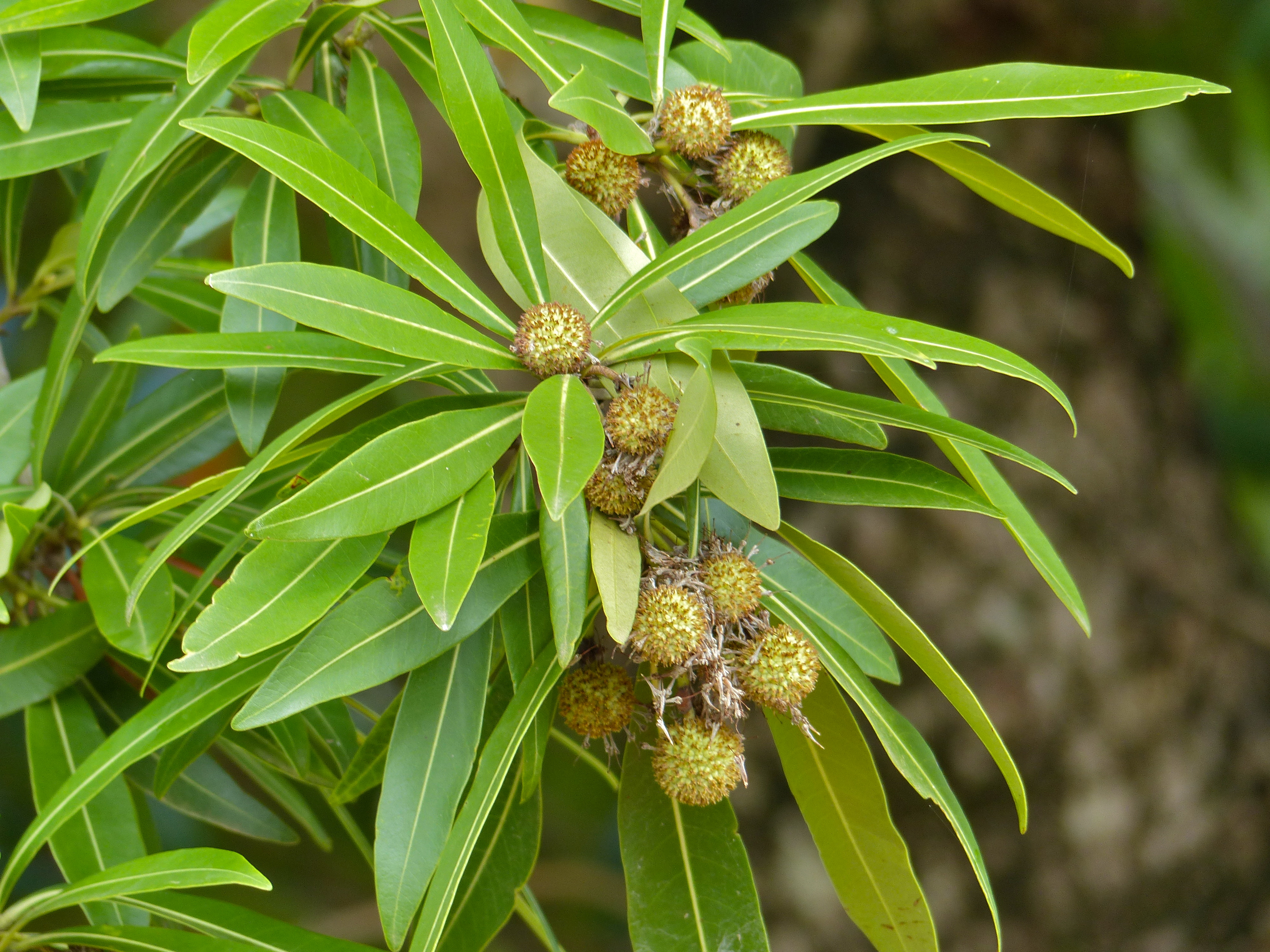

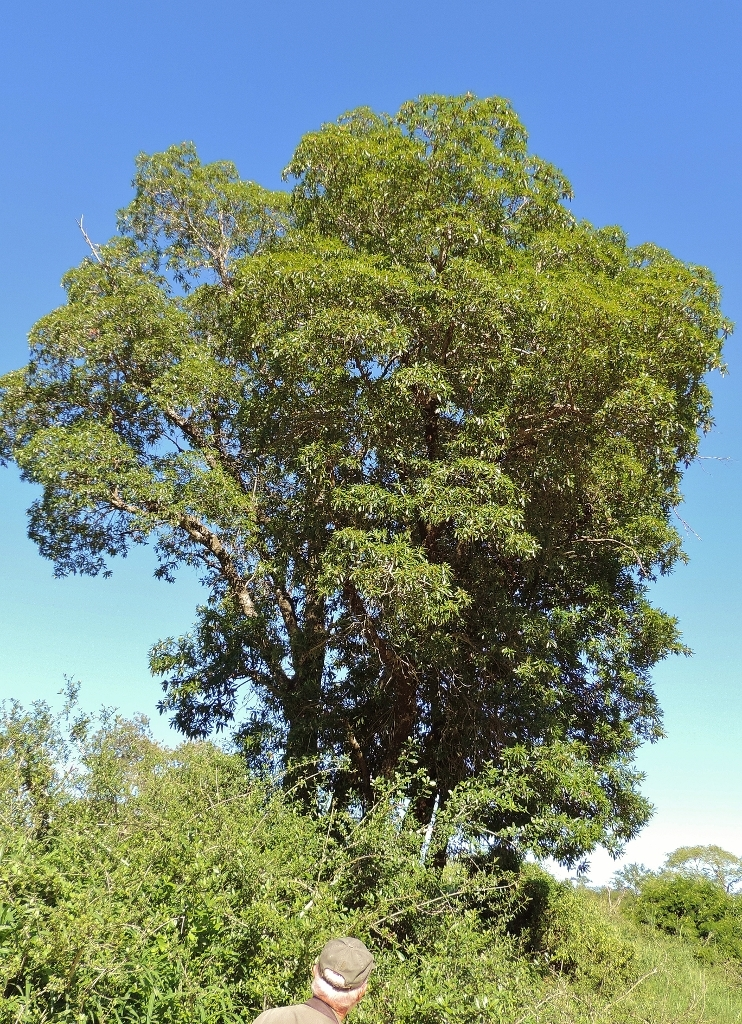
- Matumi in Masvingo Province, Zimbabwe

Conservation status
- Least Concern (IUCN 3.1)

Scientific classification
- Kingdom: Plantae
- Clade: Tracheophytes
- Clade: Angiosperms
- Clade: Eudicots
- Clade: Asterids
- Order: Gentianales
- Family: Rubiaceae
- Subfamily: Cinchonoideae
- Tribe: Naucleeae
- Genus: Breonadia; Ridsdale
- Species: B. salicina

Binomial name
- Breonadia salicina (Vahl) Hepper & J.R.I.Wood
- IUCN distribution of Breonadia salicina (as of 2018)

Synonyms
- Adina galpinii Oliv.; Adina lasiantha K.Schum.; Adina microcephala (Delile) Hiern; Adina spathellifera (Baker) Oliv.; Breonadia microcephala (Delile) Ridsdale; Cephalanthus coriaceus K.Schum.; Cephalanthus spathelliferus Baker; Nauclea microcephala Delile; Nauclea verticillata Baill.; Nerium salicinum Vahl

= Breonadia =

Matumi

Genus of flowering plants

Breonadia is a monotypic genus of flowering plants in the family Rubiaceae. It was described by Colin Ernest Ridsdale in 1975. The genus contains only one species, viz. Breonadia salicina, which is found in tropical and southern Africa from Mali and Benin east to Ethiopia, south to South Africa, as well as Yemen, Saudi Arabia and Madagascar.

Breonadia salicina (Matumi, Afrikaans: Mingerhout, Sotho: Mohlomê, Venda: Mutu-lume, Zulu: Umfomfo) is a protected tree in South Africa.

== Characteristics ==
Breonadia salicina is a medium to large evergreen tree. The leaves occur alternately or in whorls of 3 to 5. The leaf shape is generally lanceolate and the leaf margin is entire. They are leathery to the touch and usually a dark green with yellow on the midrib, which is slightly raised. The fruit is a capsule and they cluster in small spheres. The trees are monoecious with flowers that are small and yellow in colour. The tree is generally found in subtropical to tropical climates, mainly in small populations in South Africa to Saudi Arabia and even Madagascar. It can be found in areas up to 2,000 meters above sea level. They usually live on river banks or in the waters of a stream.

This species is often used in traditional medicine. Many times the whole plant can be used in treating diseases like arthritis and illnesses like diarrhoea. In one experiment, leaf extracts of Breonadia salicina helped prevent the growth of bacteria that cause food poisoning.

== Genetic diversity ==
In a population of B. salicina in Saudi Arabia, genetic diversity was low within individuals of a single population, but was high between individuals from other populations. This means that the individual small populations of B. salicina are very different from one another, but very little genetic diversity is present within the small populations. The populations are fairly far apart (the species is endangered) which would account for the high diversity rate between populations. The populations are also small in size and would be noticeably affected by genetic drift. Tropical trees also must deal with environmental factors such as deforestation and logging. B. salicina has been used as a source of wood used to build houses and objects.

Physical characteristics, such as diameter and density of xylem vessels, is due to the plant's genetic makeup, but also many environmental factors as well (for this experiment it was rainfall).

== Medicinal uses ==
Breonadia salicina is used in traditional African medicine. Mainly people use the bark to fight diarrhoea and other stomach/digestive tract problems but also use other parts of the plant for different uses. The bark of B. salicina has been found to be rich in tannins. Tannins are polyphenols that have been found to help with reducing growth of E. coli in digestive tracts. Leaf extracts of B. salicina have also been found to reduce activity of both gram-negative and gram-positive bacteria. It is believed that these same anti-bacterial properties of B. salicina can be used for the preservation of foods.

Possible antifungal compounds have also been isolated in B. salicina. The same antifungal compounds in B. salicina have been found to show activity in protecting oranges from infections.

== See also ==
- List of Southern African indigenous trees
