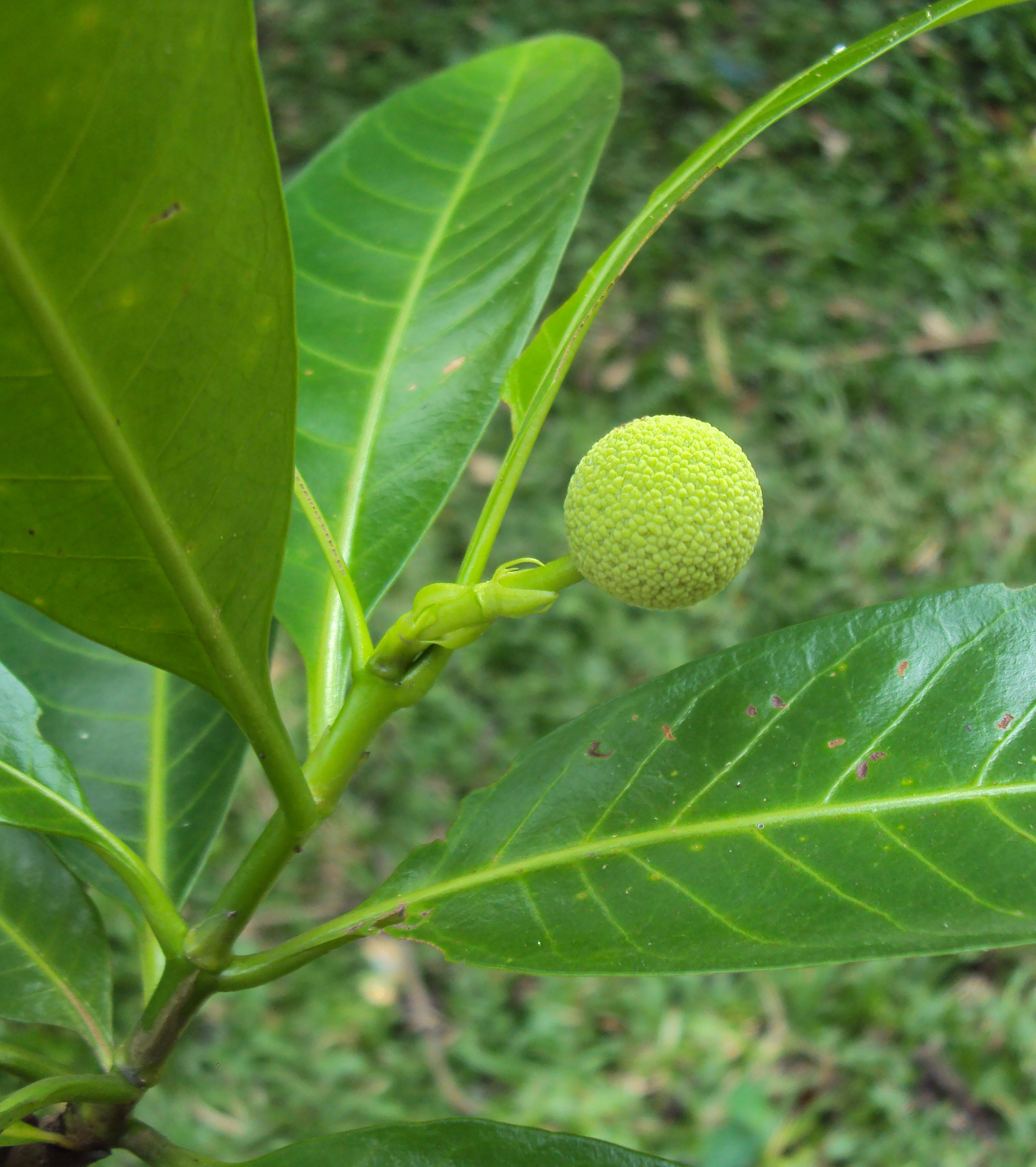
- Leaves and bud

Conservation status
- Vulnerable (IUCN 3.1)

Scientific classification
- Kingdom: Plantae
- Clade: Tracheophytes
- Clade: Angiosperms
- Clade: Eudicots
- Clade: Asterids
- Order: Gentianales
- Family: Rubiaceae
- Genus: Ochreinauclea
- Species: O. missionis

Binomial name
- Ochreinauclea missionis (Wall. ex G. Don) Ridsd.

= Ochreinauclea missionis =

Species of plant

Ochreinauclea missionis is a species of plant in the family Rubiaceae. It is endemic to India. It is threatened by habitat loss.

The caterpillars of the commander (Limenitis procris), a brush-footed butterfly, utilize this species as a food plant.
