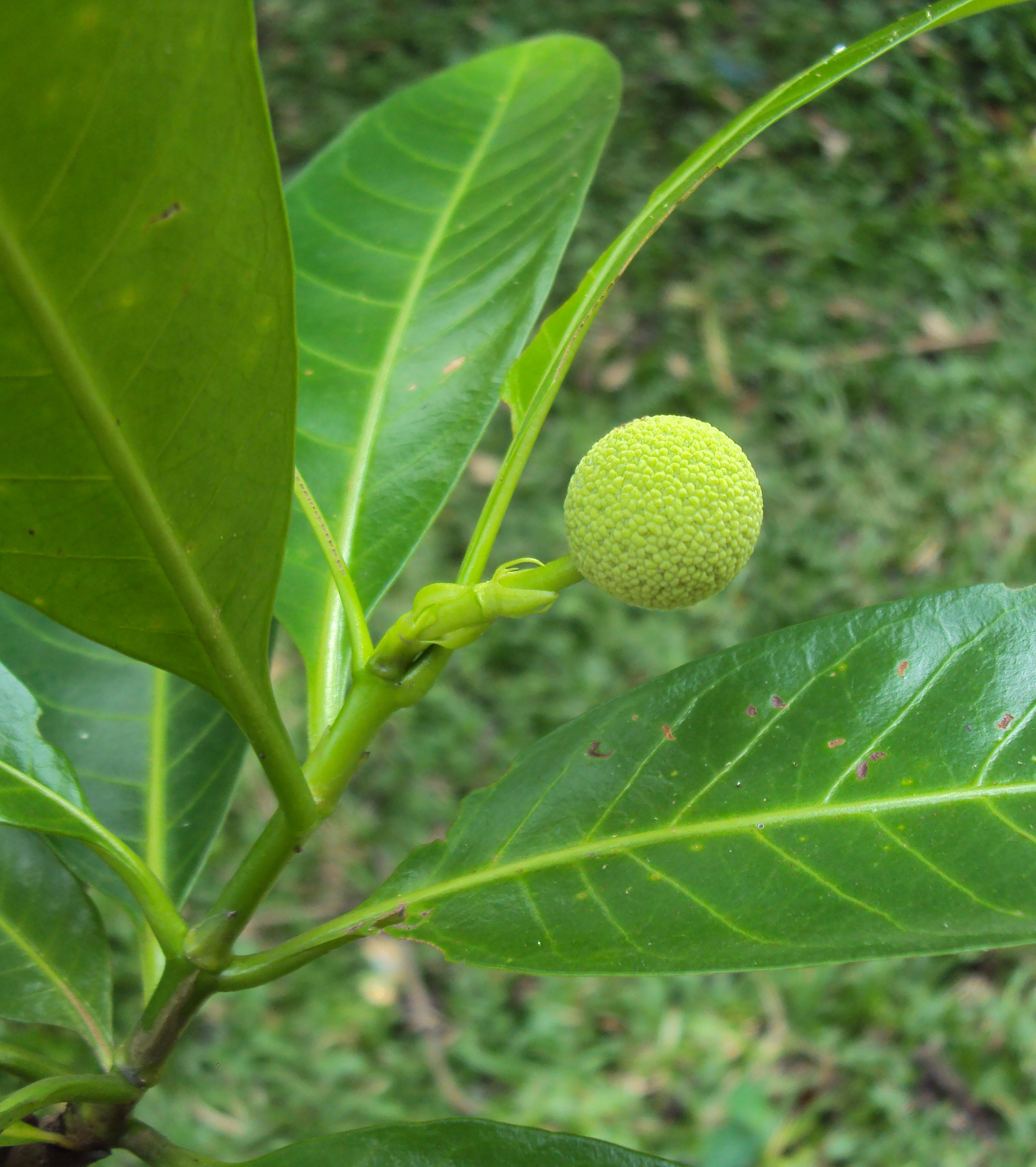
- Ochreinauclea missionis

Scientific classification
- Kingdom: Plantae
- Clade: Tracheophytes
- Clade: Angiosperms
- Clade: Eudicots
- Clade: Asterids
- Order: Gentianales
- Family: Rubiaceae
- Subfamily: Cinchonoideae
- Tribe: Naucleeae
- Genus: Ochreinauclea; Ridsdale & Bakh.f.

= Ochreinauclea =

Genus of plants

Ochreinauclea is a genus of plant in the family Rubiaceae. It contains the following species:

- Ochreinauclea maingayi (Hook.f.) Ridsdale
- Ochreinauclea missionis (Wall. ex G. Don) Ridsd.
