= Uncaria elliptica =

Scientific classification
- Kingdom: Plantae
- Clade: Tracheophytes
- Clade: Angiosperms
- Clade: Eudicots
- Clade: Asterids
- Order: Gentianales
- Family: Rubiaceae
- Genus: Uncaria
- Species: U. elliptica

Binomial name
- Uncaria elliptica R.Br. ex G.Don

Synonyms
- Nauclea dasyoneura (Korth.) Walp.; Nauclea elliptica (R.Br. ex G.Don) Walp.; Uncaria brevispina Maingay ex Hook.f.; Uncaria dasyoneura Korth.; Uncaria gambier Thwaites, sensu auct.; Uncaria rostrata Pierre ex Pit.; Uncaria thwaitesii (Hook.f.) Alston; Uruparia dasyoneura (Korth.) Kuntze

Species of plant

Uncaria elliptica, synonym Uncaria thwaitesii, is a species of plant in the family Rubiaceae. It is native from Sri Lanka through Indo-China to west Malesia.

== Distribution ==
Uncaria elliptica is native to Borneo, Cambodia, Java, the Malay Peninsula, Myanmar, Sri Lanka, Sumatra and Thailand.

== Conservation ==
Uncaria thwaitesii was assessed as "critically endangered" in the 1998 IUCN Red List, where it is said to be native only to Sri Lanka. As of February 2023, U. thwaitesii was regarded as a synonym of Uncaria elliptica, which has a wider distribution.

== Phytochemicals ==
Uncaria elliptica, a woody climber belonging to the Rubiaceae family, is notable for its diverse alkaloid and flavonoid content. Phytochemical investigations have revealed the presence of several key compounds in both the leaves and bark.

=== Alkaloids ===
Numerous alkaloids have been isolated from U. elliptica, with significant differences observed based on the region and growth conditions of the plant. A study of bark collected from the wet lowland forests of Sri Lanka identified the alkaloids ajmalicine, formosanine, isomitraphylline, and mitraphylline, with yields ranging from 0.0015% to 0.0218% by dry weight. Another investigation of bark from the lower montane zone revealed the presence of additional alkaloids, such as roxburghine D and X, which were absent in samples from other regions.

In a separate study, samples collected from Thailand yielded several pentacyclic heteroyohimbine alkaloids, including 14-β-hydroxy-3-isorauniticine, rauniticine oxindole A, and akuammigine pseudoindoxyl. The species is chemically diverse, with various diastereoisomers isolated across different regions.

=== Flavonoids ===
The leaves of U. elliptica are also rich in flavonoids, particularly rutin and (-)-epicatechin. Chromatographic analysis of fresh leaves revealed that rutin content can reach up to 20.2% of the dry weight in young leaves, making U. elliptica a significant commercial source of rutin.
