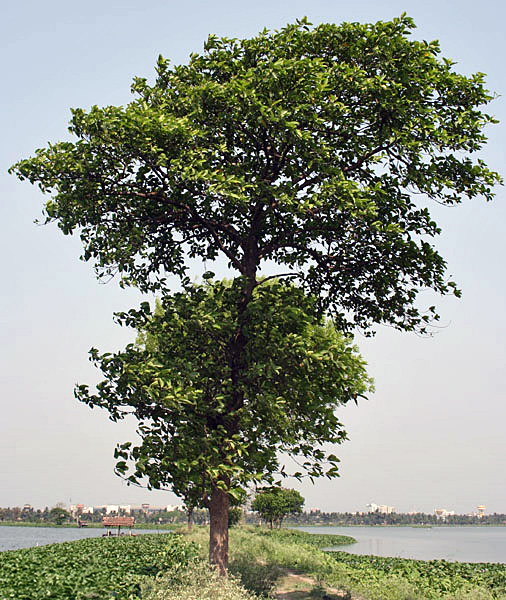
- Tree in Kolkata, West Bengal, India.
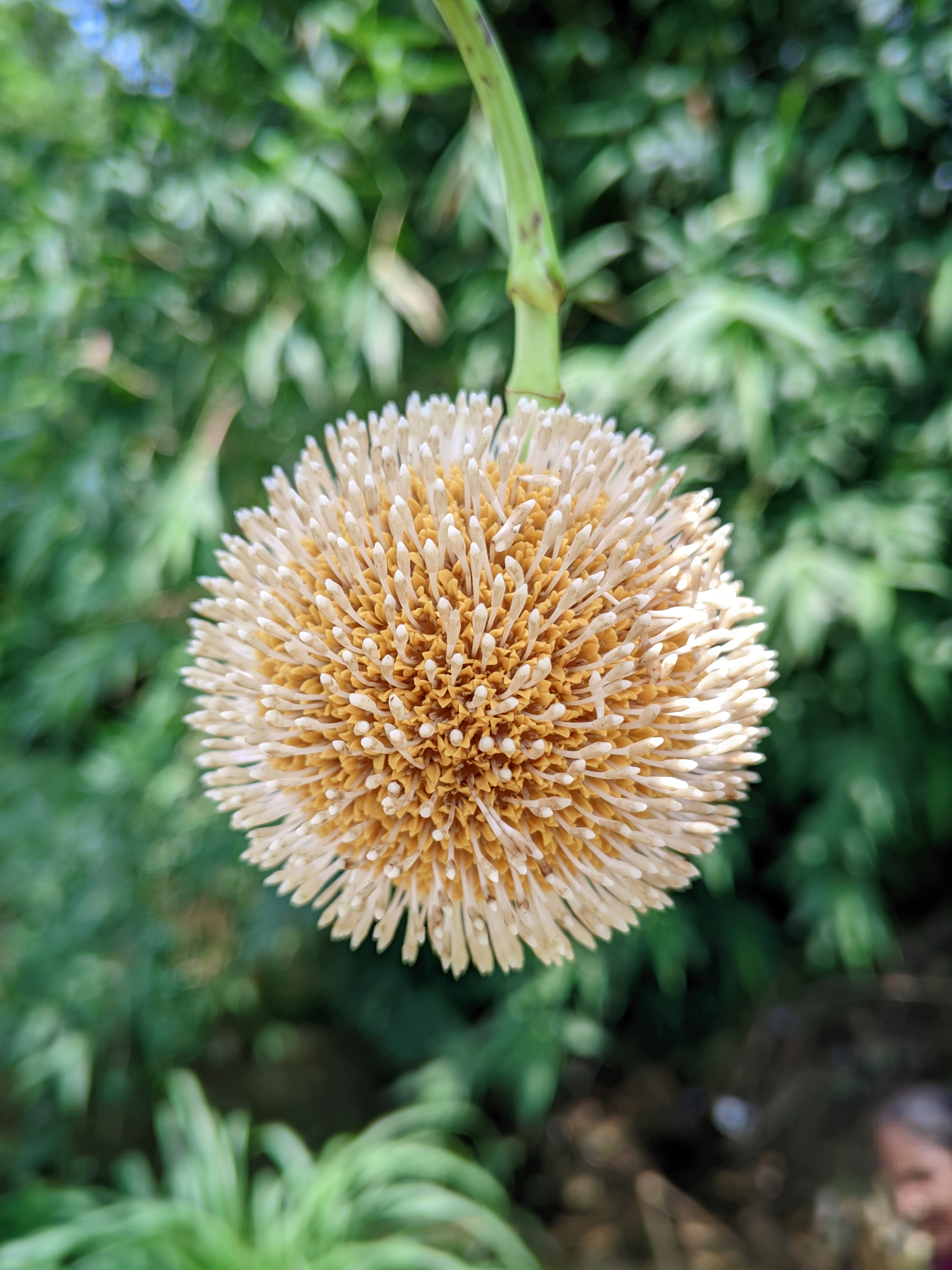
- Close-up of flower

Scientific classification
- Kingdom: Plantae
- Clade: Tracheophytes
- Clade: Angiosperms
- Clade: Eudicots
- Clade: Asterids
- Order: Gentianales
- Family: Rubiaceae
- Genus: Neolamarckia
- Species: N. cadamba

Binomial name
- Neolamarckia cadamba (Roxb.) Bosser

Synonyms
- Nauclea cadamba Roxb.; Anthocephalus cadamba (Roxb.) Miq.; Anthocephalus indicus var. glabrescens H.L.Li; Anthocephalus morindifolius Korth.; Nauclea megaphylla S.Moore; Neonauclea megaphylla (S.Moore) S.Moore; Samama cadamba (Roxb.) Kuntze; Sarcocephalus cadamba (Roxb.) Kurz

= Neolamarckia cadamba =

Species of tree

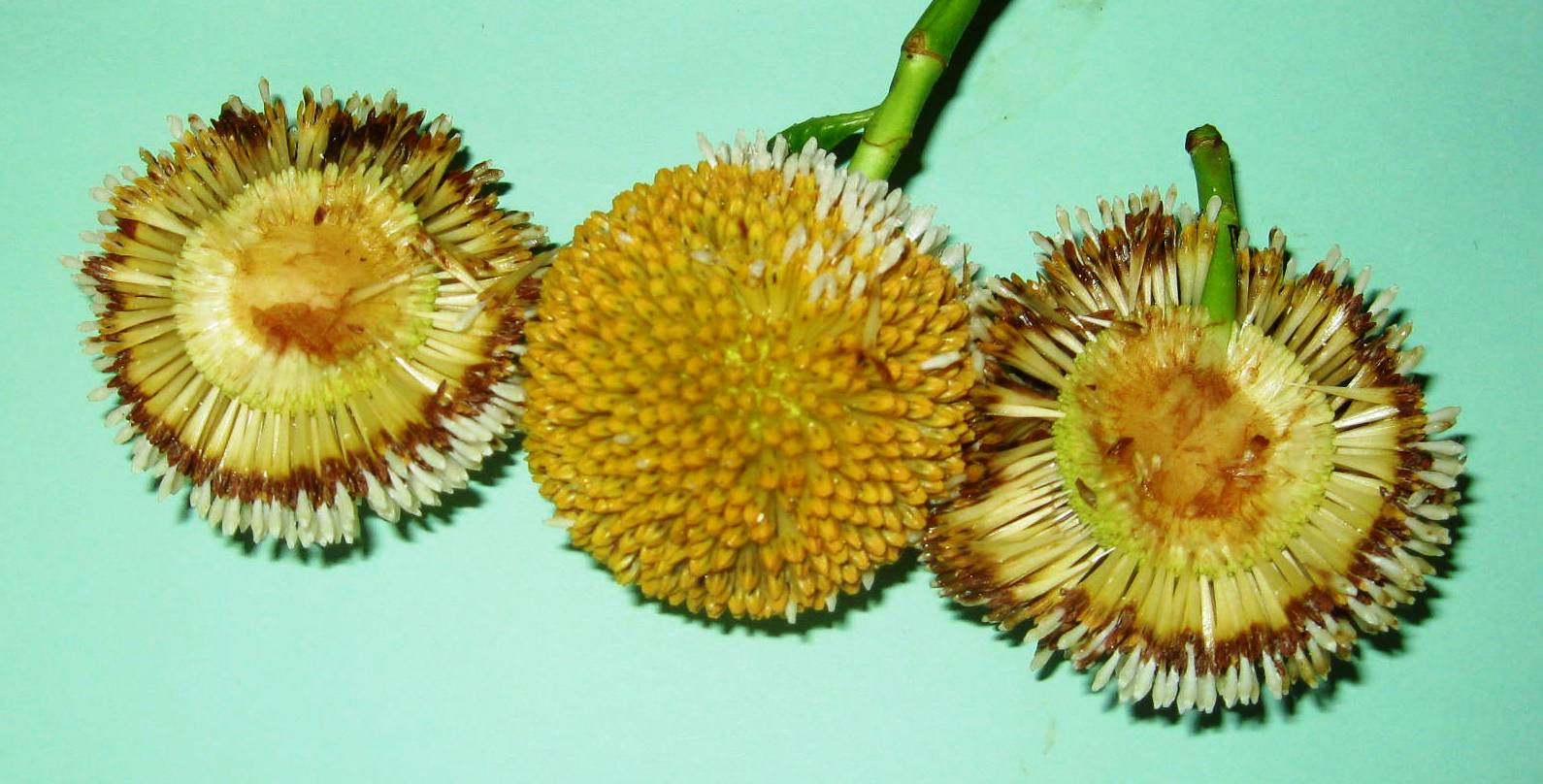
A full fruit with two halved

Neolamarckia cadamba, with English common names burflower-tree, laran, and Leichhardt pine, and called kadamba or kadam or cadamba locally, is an evergreen, tropical tree native to South and Southeast Asia. The genus name honours French naturalist Jean-Baptiste Lamarck. It has scented orange flowers in dense globe-shaped clusters. The flowers are used in perfumes. The tree is grown as an ornamental plant and for timber and paper-making. Kadamba features in Indian religions.

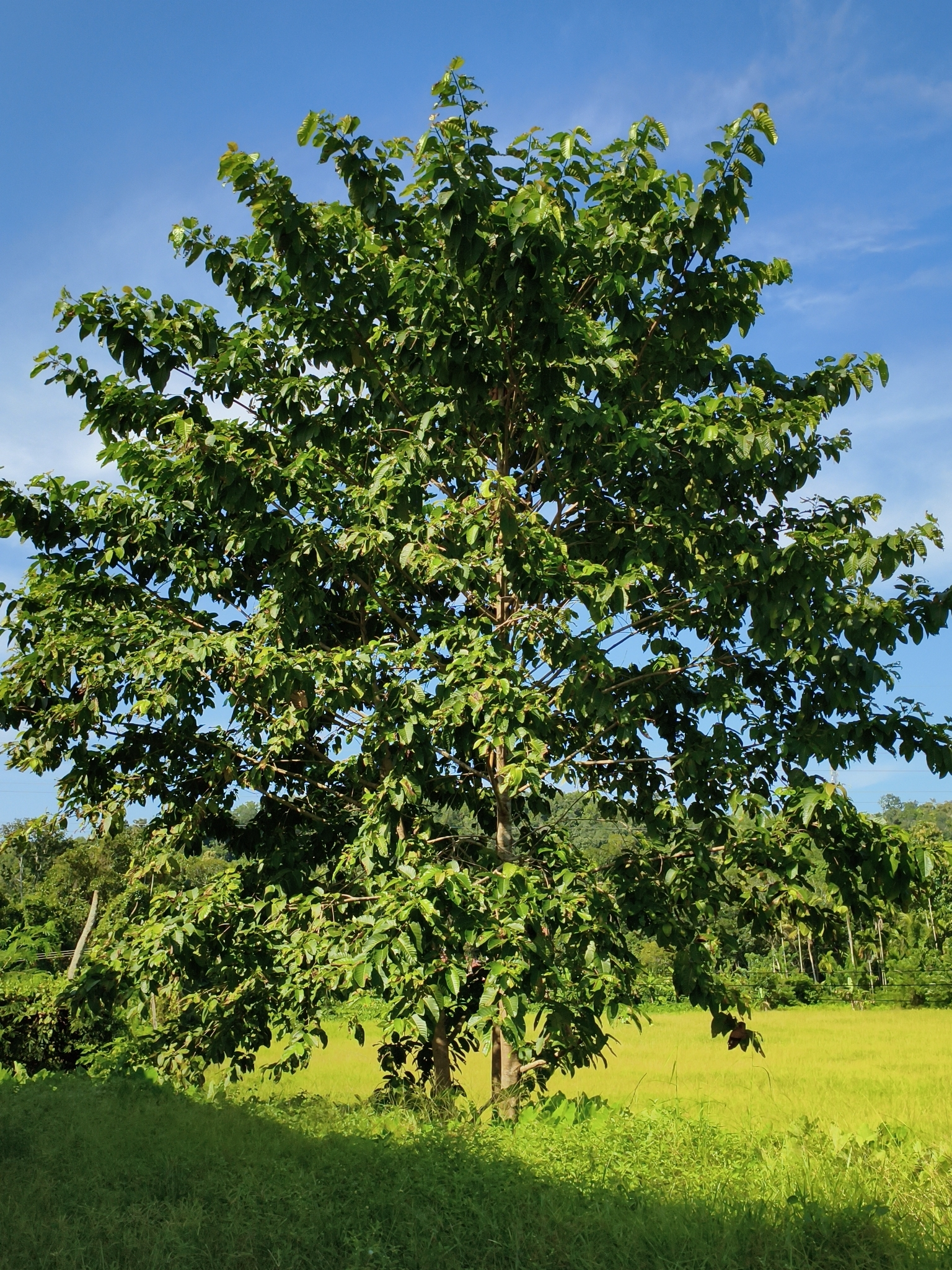
Kadamba tree in Pathanamthitta, Kerala

== Description ==
A fully mature tree can reach up to 45 m (148 ft) in height. It is a large tree with a broad crown and straight cylindrical bole. It is quick growing, with broad spreading branches and grows rapidly in the first 6–8 years. The trunk has a diameter of 100–160 cm, but typically less than that. Leaves are 13–32 cm (5.1–12.6 in) long. Flowering usually begins when the tree is 4–5 years old.

Its flowers are sweetly fragrant, red to orange in colour, occurring in dense, globular heads of approximately 5.5 cm (2.2 in) diameter. The fruit of N. cadamba occur in small, fleshy capsules packed closely together to form a fleshy yellow-orange infructescence containing approximately 8000 seeds. On maturing, the fruit splits apart, releasing the seeds, which are then dispersed by wind or rain.

- Stamens 5, inserted on the corolla tube, filaments short, anthers basifixed. Ovary inferior, bi-locular, sometimes 4-locular in the upper part, style exserted and a spindle-shaped stigma.
- Fruitlets numerous with their upper parts containing 4 hollow or solid structures. Seed trigonal or irregularly shaped.
- The sapwood is white with a light yellow tinge becoming creamy yellow on exposure and is not clearly differentiated from the heartwood.

== Ecology ==
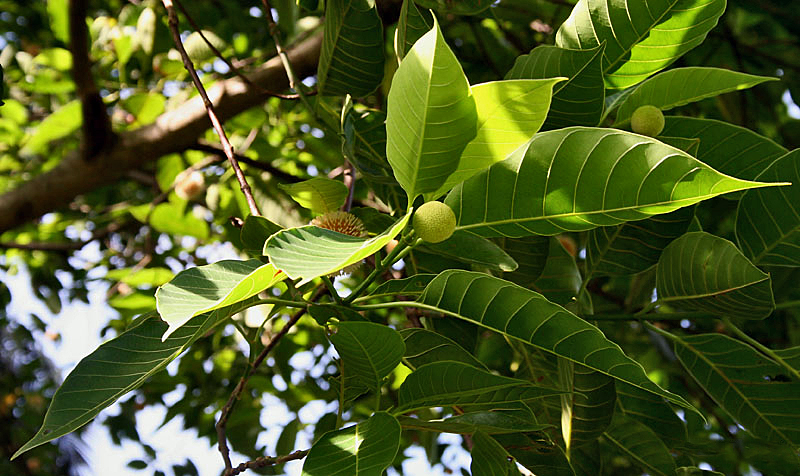
Leaves and flower buds

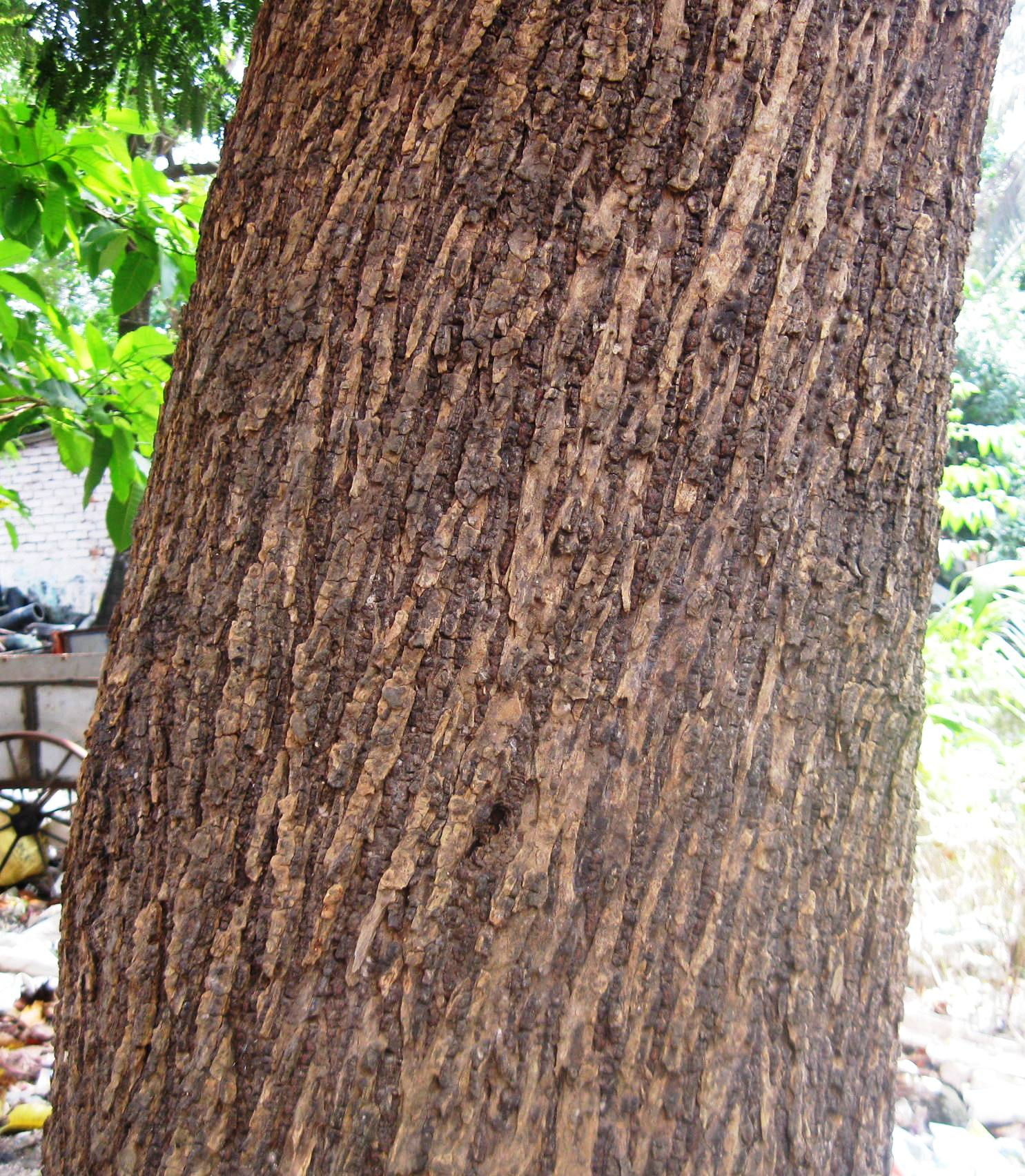
Lower trunk of tree

N. cadamba is native to the following areas:

- Southern China
- Indian subcontinent: India (n. & w.); Bangladesh; Nepal; Sri Lanka
- Southeast Asia: Cambodia; Laos; Myanmar; Thailand; Vietnam, Indonesia; Malaysia; Papua New Guinea; Australia

It is an introduced species in Puerto Rico at Toro Negro State Forest.

The larvae of Moduza procris, a brush-footed butterfly, and Arthroschista hilaralis, a moth, consume this species. The flowers attract pollinators.

== Taxonomy ==
The botanical name of this species has been the subject of a long taxonomic debate, beginning in the 1930s. The problem arose because scientific names are based on type specimens. In 1785 Jean-Baptiste Lamarck described a specimen under the name Cephalanthus chinensis, stating that it came from Madagascar. In 1830, Achille Richard created the name Anthocephalus indicus, stating that the species came from Asia and that his description was based on the same specimen as Lamarck's Cephalanthus chinensis. (Under the rules of the International Code of Nomenclature for algae, fungi, and plants, Richard should have used the name A. chinensis rather than A. indicus, as he should not have changed the specific epithet.)

The issue is whether Richard was indeed using the same specimen as Lamarck; the geographical origin is said to be different, and the descriptions do not match; for example in Lamarck's Cephalanthus chinensis the inflorescences are axillary whereas in Richard's Anthocephalus they are terminal. If specimens were the same, then Anthocephalus is a synonym of the Madagascan Cephalanthus and cannot be a generic name for the Asian kadam tree. If they were different (in spite of Richard's claim that they were the same) then Anthocephalus could be a generic name for the kadam tree. Based on the latter view, the name Anthocephalus chinensis has been widely used for the kadam tree.

The current view taken by most taxonomic sources is that Richard's Anthocephalus indicus or Anthocephalus chinensis is a synonym of Cephalanthus chinensis (now transferred to the genus Breonia as Breonia chinensis (Lam.) Capuron), and that the widespread use of Anthocephalus chinensis for the kadam tree is an error. (This erroneous sense of the scientific name is shown by writing A. chinensis auct., where "auct." is an abbreviation of the Latin for "of authors", i.e. rather than of the correct authority.)

Given that Richard's name for the kadam tree is incorrect, the earliest name is William Roxburgh's 1824 Nauclea cadamba. In 1984, Jean Marie Bosser created the new generic name Neolamarckia, honouring Lamarck, for the Asian genus which matched Richard's description of his Anthocephalus, transferring Nauclea cadamba as Neolamarckia cadamba (Roxb.) Bosser. However, not all botanical sources have accepted this taxonomic analysis and the name Anthocephalus is still in use for the Asian genus.

== Uses ==
The fruit and inflorescences are reportedly edible by humans. The fresh leaves are fed to cattle. N. lamarckia is grown as an ornamental, and for low-grade timber and paper. The timber is used for plywood, light construction, pulp and paper, boxes and crates, dug-out canoes, and furniture components. Kadamba yields a pulp of satisfactory brightness and performance as a hand sheet. The wood can be easily impregnated with synthetic resins to increase its density and compressive strength. The wood has a density of 290–560 kg/cu m at 15% moisture content, a fine to medium texture; straight grain; low luster and has no characteristic odor or taste. It is easy to work, with hand and machine tools, cuts cleanly, gives a very good surface and is easy to nail. The timber air dries rapidly with little or no degrade. Kadamba wood is very easy to preserve using either open tank or pressure-vacuum systems.

Kadamba is one of the most frequently planted trees in the tropics. The tree is grown along avenues, roadsides and villages for shade. Kadamba are suitable for reforestation programs. It sheds large amounts of leaf and non-leaf litter which on decomposition improves some physical and chemical properties of soil under its canopy. This reflects an increase in the level of soil organic carbon, cation-exchange capacity, available plant nutrients and exchangeable bases.

A yellow dye is obtained from the root bark. Kadamba flowers are an important raw material in the production of ‘attar’, which is Indian perfume with sandalwood (Santalum spp.) base in which one of the essences is absorbed through hydro-distillation. An extract of the leaves serves as a mouth gargle. The bulbous fruit (bearing flowers) is edible and is consumed raw in Northern India. It is fragrant, sweet and little tangy in taste and is widely enjoyed as relish.

The leaf extract has recently been used to produce silver nanoparticles for surface-enhanced Raman spectroscopy.

== Cultural significance ==
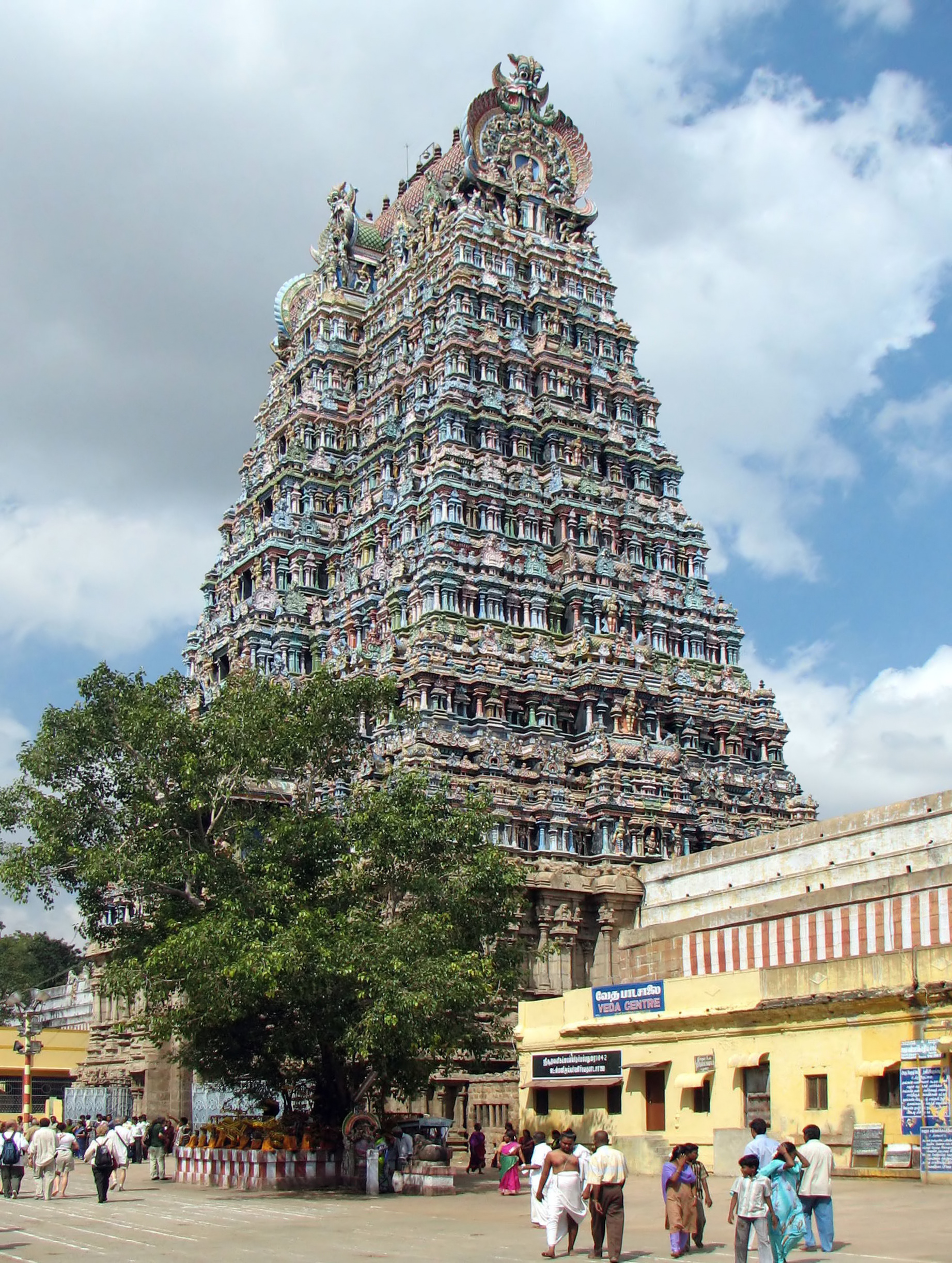
At the entrance to the Meenakshi temple, Madurai, Tamil Nadu, India

=== Symbolism ===
The kadamba flower was the emblem of Athmallik State, one of the princely states of India during the period of the British Raj.

Ediga community in india worship kadamba tree as there devote tree, Edgar thurston mention in his book, the main goddes of this community was yellamma who later blessed in this tree.

The kadamba lends its name to the Kadamba Dynasty that ruled from Banavasi in what is now the state of Karnataka from 345 CE to 525 CE, as per Talagunda inscription of c.450 CE. The kadamba tree was considered a holy tree by the Kadamba dynasty.

According to Hindu tradition the 27 nakshatras, constituting 12 Houses (Rasis) and nine planets, are specifically represented precisely by 27 trees —one for each star. The kadamba tree is said to represent Shatabhisha, roughly corresponding to Aquarii.

=== Religious significance ===
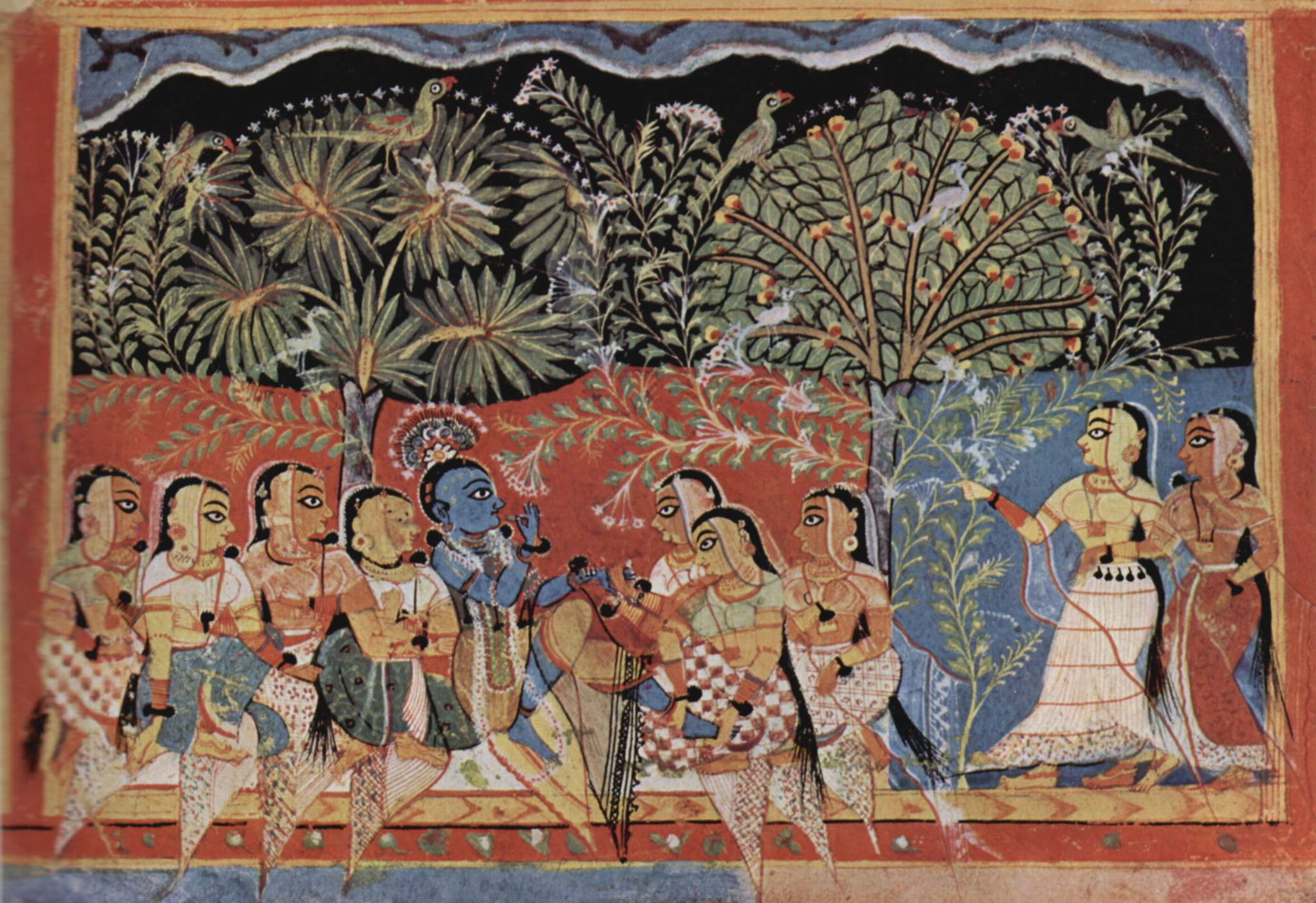
Gita Govinda by Jayadeva

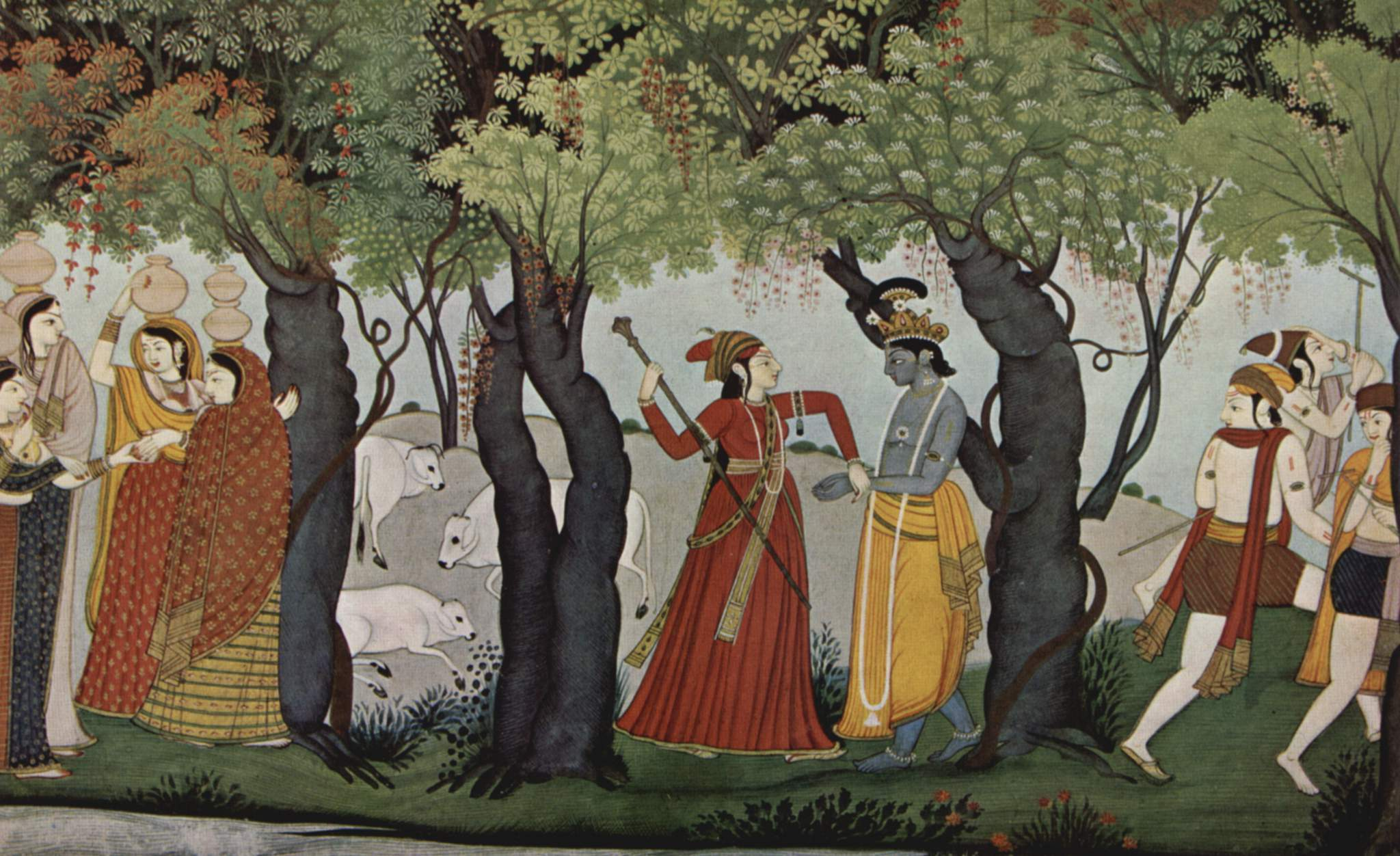
Radha with Krishna

Kadamba is mentioned in the Bhagavata Purana. In North India, it is associated with Krishna while in the south it is known as "Parvati’s tree". Radha and Krishna are supposed to have played in the hospitable and sweet-scented shade of the kadamba tree. In the Sangam period of Tamil Nadu, Murugan of Tirupparankundram Hill of Madurai was referred to as a centre of nature worship. He was in the form of a spear under a kadamba tree.

An episode from the life of Krishna narrates of when he stole the garments of gopis when they were bathing in a pond near Vrindavan. Varuna, the sea-god, had forbidden nude bathing in rivers, ponds and other public places, but gopis often resorted to it. One day, to teach them a lesson, Krishna reached the bank of the pond where they were taking a bath and took away their garments and spread them on the branches of nearby kadamba tree. He himself climbed the tree and hid there behind a branch. After the gopis had bathed, they looked for their garments but found them missing. Suddenly their attention was drawn to the nearby kadamba tree by the stirring of its branches. When they looked up, they saw Krishna hiding there and their garments scattered all over the branches of the tree. Krishna insisted that they come out naked to receive their garments. This episode is portrayed in song, story, painting and artifacts, in the backdrop of the kadamba tree.

Karam-Kadamba is a popular harvest festival, celebrated on the eleventh lunar day of the month Bhadrapada. A twig of the tree is brought and worshipped in the courtyard of the house. Later in the day, young ears of grain are distributed among friends and relatives. This festive custom has been adopted by the Tulu people. Onam (Kerala) and Huttari (Kodagu) are regional variants of this festival. Kadambotsava ("The festival of Kadamba") is also the festival that is celebrated every year by the Government of Karnataka in honor of the Kadamba kingdom, the first ruling Kingdom of Karnataka, at Banavasi, as it was here that the Kadamba kings organised the spring festival every year.

The kadamba tree is also associated with a tree deity called Kadambariyamman. The kadamba, which is considered the Sthala Vriksha ("tree of the place") of the city that is otherwise known as Kadambavanam (kadamba forest) and is present in Meenakshi Amman Temple, Madurai. A withered relic of the kadamba is also preserved there.

In Theravada Buddhism, the kadamba tree was where Sumedha Buddha achieved enlightenment.

=== Social diversions ===
Pelting each other with the flowers of the kadamba tree is shown as a sport for social diversions in the Kama Sutra.

=== Poetry ===
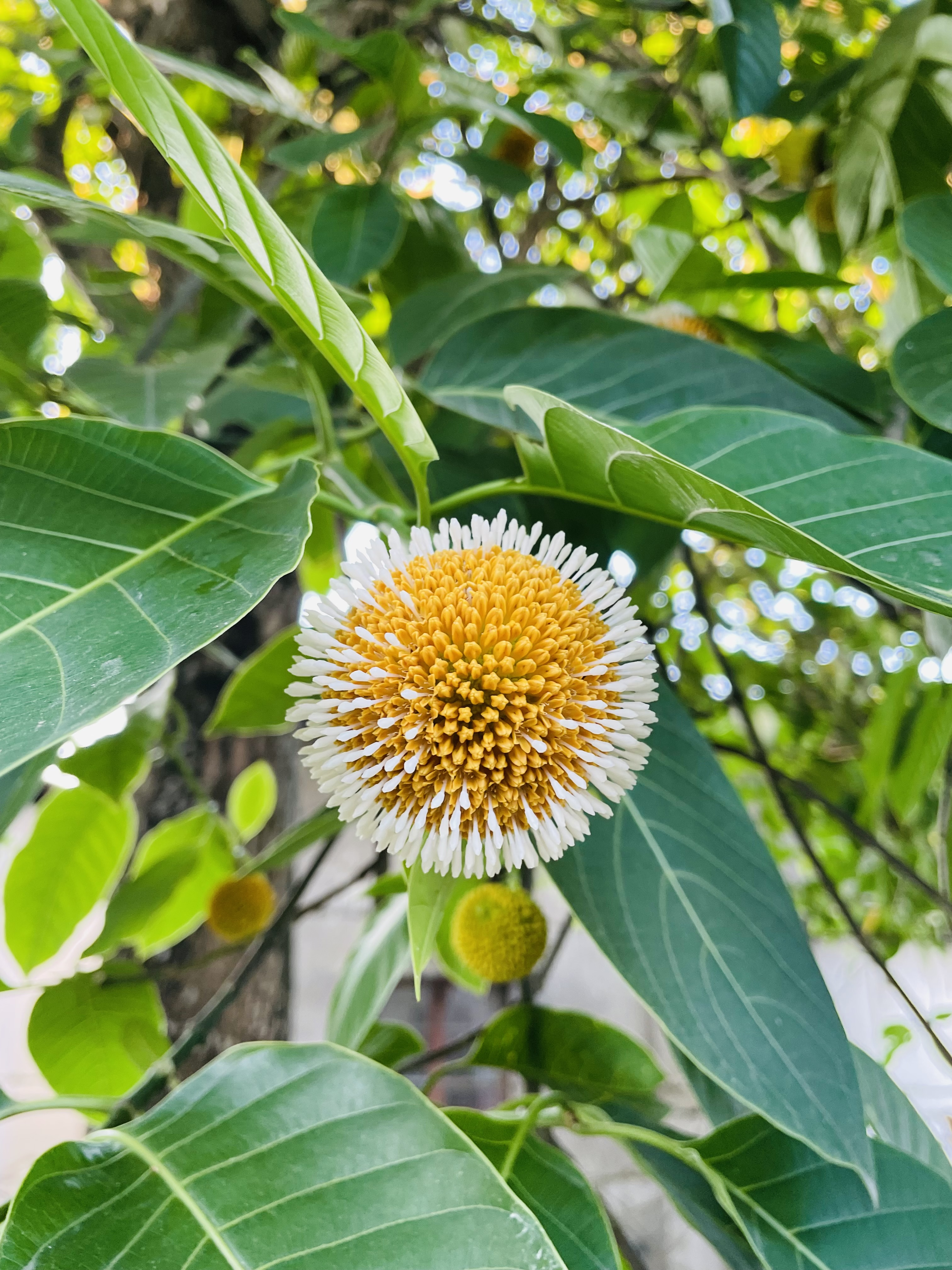
Flower at Duliajan, Assam

It's associated with pleasant monsoon rains after summer, as in these verses from Ritusamharam by Kalidasa:

And the forest, its heat cooled

all over by showers of rain,

is as if filled with great delight:

the kadamba flowering everywhere,

and tree branches dancing in the breeze

as the ketaki laughs with its needle leaves.

Kadamba flowers stir deep longing in lovers parted by the monsoon, when travel becomes arduous and reunions seem distant:

And the breeze rustling through

groves of sarja and kadamba,

of arjuna, nipa, ketaki trees,

carrying their flower scents

and also cooled by drizzling clouds:

whom does this not fill with longing?

The kadamba is also associated with Lord Krishna and the bhakti poetry which shows the separation between the lovers Krishna and Radha during rainy season. Biharilal writes:

Now leave all hope of help, the rains have come:

to bear the fragrance of kadamba flowers

is certainly no game.

Some believe this species is not the true kadamba referenced in Bhakti poetry, instead the kadamba of Stephegyne genus, Mitragyna parvifolia, which grows around Vrindavan, is.

== See also ==
- Nauclea orientalis, the Leichhardt tree. A species commonly confused with the kadam tree.
