= Neonauclea sessilifolia =

Scientific classification
- Kingdom: Plantae
- Clade: Tracheophytes
- Clade: Angiosperms
- Clade: Eudicots
- Clade: Asterids
- Order: Gentianales
- Family: Rubiaceae
- Genus: Neonauclea
- Species: N. sessilifolia

Binomial name
- Neonauclea sessilifolia (Roxb.) Merr.

Synonyms
- Adina sessilifolia (Roxb.) Hook.f. ex Brandis; Adina thanhoaensis N.N.Tran; Bancalus sericeus (Wall. ex G.Don) Kuntze; Nauclea dongnaiensis Pierre ex Pit.; Nauclea ovalifolia Roxb.; Nauclea sericea Wall. ex G.Don; Nauclea sessilifolia Roxb.; Nauclea vestita Zipp. ex Span.

Species of tree in the coffee family

Neonauclea sessilifolia is a tree species in the Rubiaceae family. It is found in Taiwan, and then from Yunnan, Zhōngguó/China, to Southeast Asia and northeastern India.

== Description ==
The tree grows some 7 to 30 m (23 to 98 ft) tall, with a dark gray, transversely fissured and cracked bark, the inner bark is brown and sometimes mottled. The papery/thinly leather leaves are elliptic to elliptic-oblong or suborbicular in shape. The taxa is distinguished from other Neonauclea in China by having the following traits: the shape of the leaf blade, 6 to 9 pairs of secondary veins on the leaves with domatia in abaxial axils of the veins (occurring on the secondary, tertiary and even often on the quaternary veins); the corolla tuve is some 5–6 mm. Flowers appear in October. The wood is whitish-grey, with a specific gravity of 0.7 g/cm^{3}.

== Distribution ==
The distribution of the species is slightly disjunctional, it grows in Taiwan, and then in a contiguous (clumped) area from Yunnan to Southeast Asia and northeastern India. Countries and regions where the plant grows are: Taiwan; Zhōngguó/China (Yunnan); Vietnam; Laos; Cambodia; Thailand; Myanmar; Bangladesh; and India (Assam, Eastern Himalaya).

== Habitat, ecology ==
In Yunnan it grows in thickets or in angiosperm forests on hills, at altitudes from 500 to 800 m (1,600 to 2,600 ft). In Southeast Asia it grows in dense/closed and secondary forest.

The Renikhayong para Village Community Forest, Bandarban District, southeastern Bangladesh, is quite diverse, in 40 acres, there are 81 species of tree, in 35 families. Euphorbiaceae species are most frequent (11 sp.), Rubiaceae next with 7 species, including the not very frequent Neonauclea sessilifolia. The forest is used by the neighbouring village for food and other material gathering, including charcoal making. Even though material is extracted from the forest, the locally managed high diversity is important for natural ecosystem conservation.

== Vernacular names ==
无柄新乌檀, wu bing xin wu tan (Standard Chinese); ru'mliëy thôm (Khmer); kam gaas (Chakma, Bangladesh); kadam (Bandarban District, Bangladesh).

== Uses ==
The wood is not very durable, in Cambodia it used for temporary constructions and the twig are used as firewood. The Chakma people living in the Hill Tracts region of southeastern Bangladesh, use the leaves in their indigenous medicine to treat skin infections (leaf paste applied twice daily).

== History ==
A prolific botanist, and very active academic, Elmer Drew Merrill first described the species in 1915, in his article "On the application of the generic name Nauclea of Linnaeus", published in the Journal of the Washington Academy of Sciences (Baltimore, MD).
