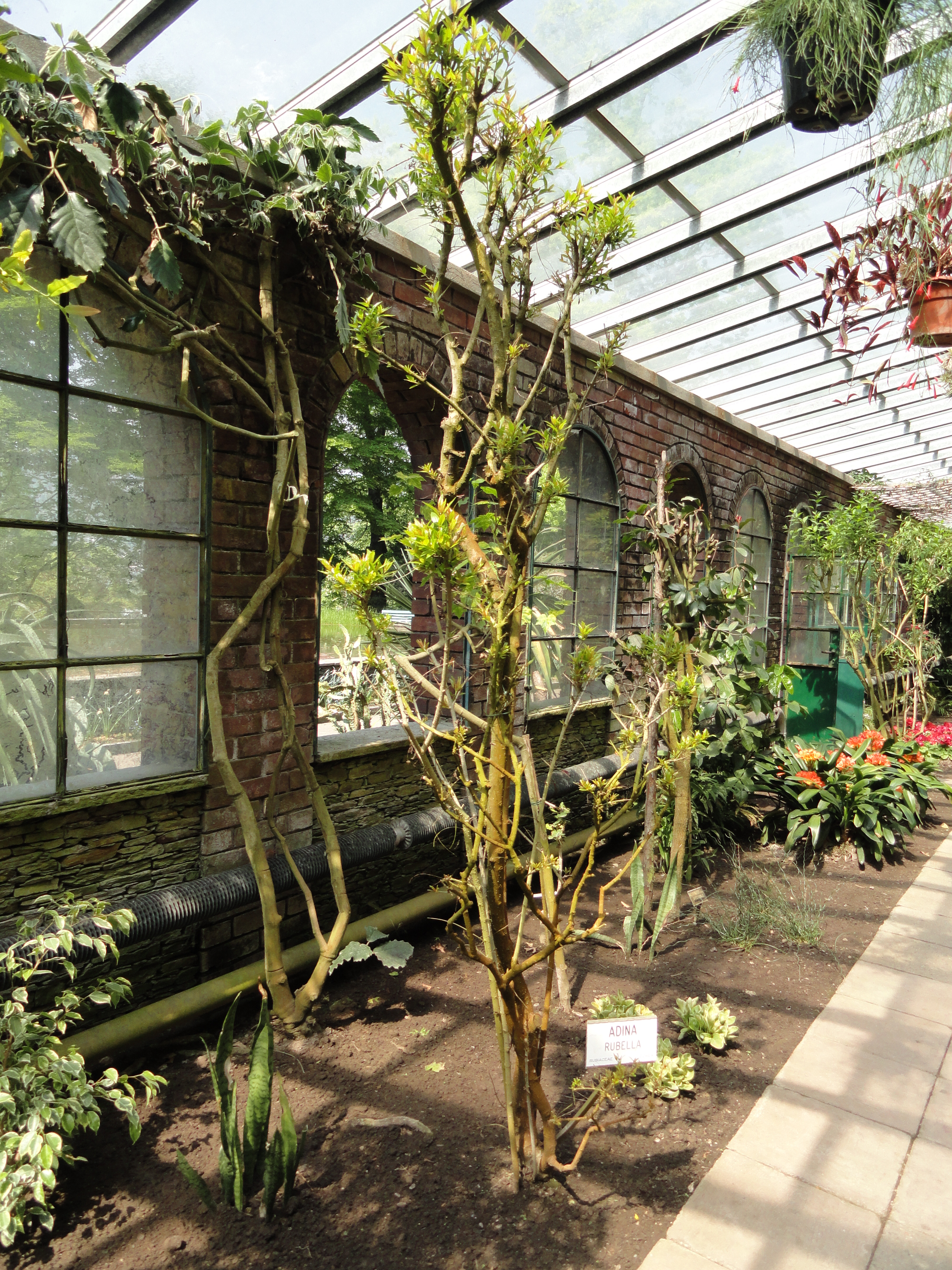
- Adina rubella

Scientific classification
- Kingdom: Plantae
- Clade: Tracheophytes
- Clade: Angiosperms
- Clade: Eudicots
- Clade: Asterids
- Order: Gentianales
- Family: Rubiaceae
- Subfamily: Cinchonoideae
- Tribe: Naucleeae
- Genus: Adina; Salisb.

Type species
- Adina pilulifera (Lam.) Franch. ex Drake

Synonyms
- Adinauclea Ridsdale (1978); Haldina Ridsdale (1978); Metadina Bakh.f. (1970); Pertusadina Ridsdale (1978); Sinoadina Ridsdale (1978)

= Adina (plant) =

Genus of flowering plants

Adina is a genus of 12 species of flowering plants in the family Rubiaceae. They are shrubs or small trees, native to East Asia and Southeast Asia.

== Description ==
Adina is a genus of shrubs and small trees. The terminal vegetative buds are inconspicuous and loosely surrounded by the stipules. The stipules are bifid for at least 2/3 of their length. The corolla lobes are nearly valvate in bud, being subimbricate at the apex. The anthers are basifixed and introrse. The ovary has two locules, with up to four ovules per locule.

== Taxonomy ==
Adina was named by Richard Salisbury in 1807 in his book, The Paradisus Londinensis. The genus name is derived from the Ancient Greek word adinos, meaning "clustered, crowded". It refers to the tightly clustered heads of flowers. The biological type for Adina consists of the specimens that Salisbury called Adina globiflora. These are now included in the species Adina pilulifera. Molecular phylogenetic studies have shown that Adina is paraphyletic over Adinauclea, a monospecific genus from Sulawesi and the Moluccas.

== Species ==
12 species are currently accepted:

- Adina cordifolia (Roxb.) Brandis - from India to Yunnan to Peninsular Malaysia
- Adina dissimilis Craib - Thailand and Peninsular Malaysia
- Adina eurhyncha (Miq.) Å.Krüger & Löfstrand - Borneo; W. Malesia; Sumatra.
- Adina fagifolia (Teijsm. & Binn. ex Havil.) Valeton ex Merr - Sulawesi and Maluku
- Adina malaccensis (Ridsdale) Å.Krüger & Löfstrand - Malaya; Thailand
- Adina metcalfii Merr. ex H.L.Li, J. Arnold SE. China to Thailand
- Adina multifolia Havil., J. Linn. - Philippines, New Guinea
- Adina pilulifera (Lam.) Franch. ex Drake - Japan, China, Vietnam
- Adina pubicostata Merr. - Hunan, Guangxi, Vietnam
- Adina racemosa (Siebold & Zucc.) Miq. – northern Myanmar and Thailand, southern China, Taiwan, and Japan
- Adina rubella Hance - China, Korea
- Adina trichotoma (Zoll. & Moritzi) Benth. & Hook.f. ex B.D.Jacks. - from Assam to southern China south to Java and New Guinea
