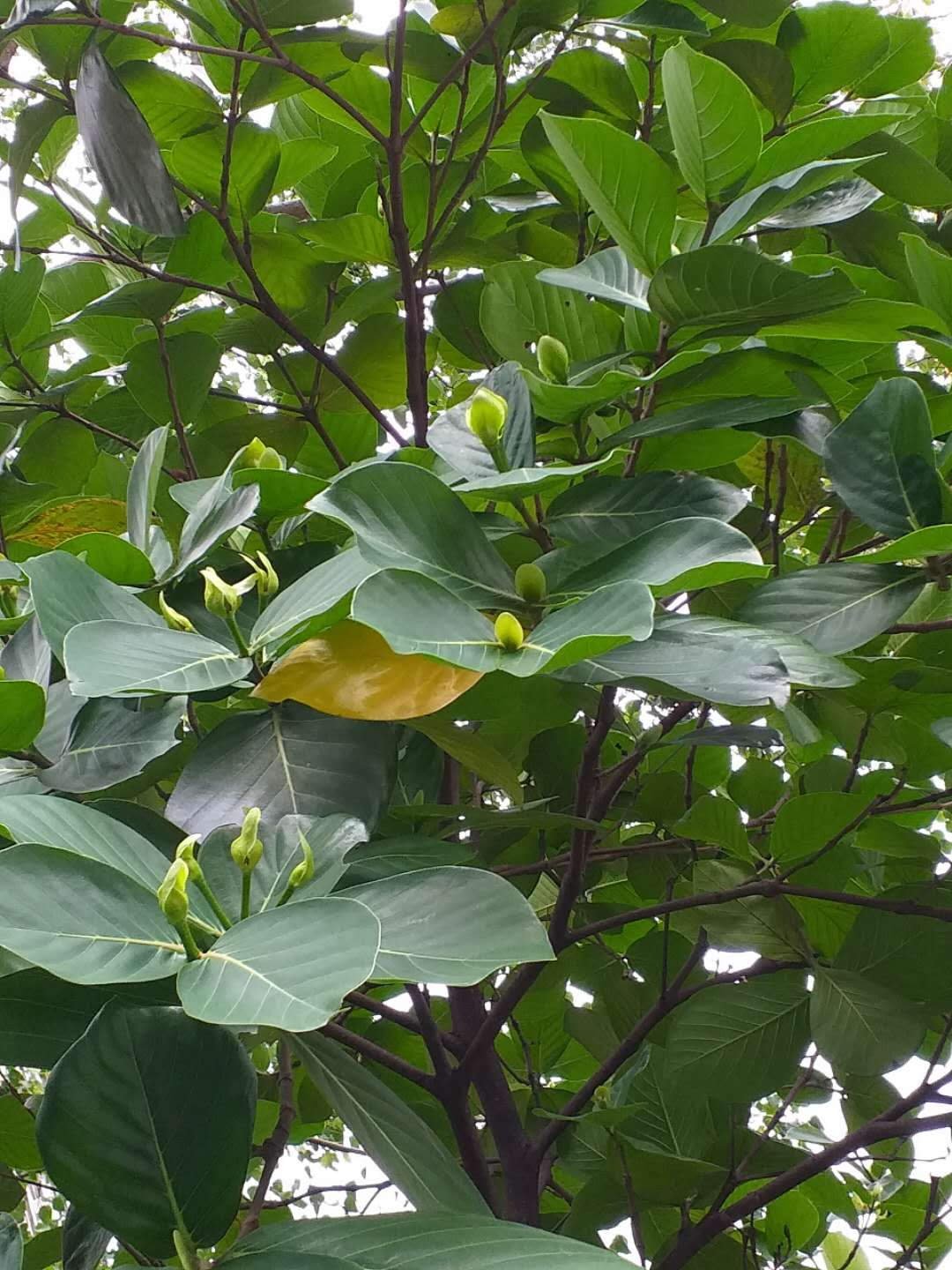
- Neonauclea truncata

Scientific classification
- Kingdom: Plantae
- Clade: Tracheophytes
- Clade: Angiosperms
- Clade: Eudicots
- Clade: Asterids
- Order: Gentianales
- Family: Rubiaceae
- Tribe: Naucleeae
- Genus: Neonauclea; Merr.

Type species
- Neonauclea excelsa (Blume) Merr.

Species
- ~65 species. See text

= Neonauclea =

Genus of flowering plants

Neonauclea is a genus of flowering plants in the family Rubiaceae. It comprises about 71 species. Neonauclea is a genus of shrubs and trees They are indigenous to China, India, Southeast Asia, Wallacea, New Guinea and Australia.

Neonauclea was named in 1915 by Elmer Drew Merrill. The generic name is derived from the related genus Nauclea and the Greek word neos, meaning "new".

The biological type for Neonauclea consists of those specimens that Merrill called Neonauclea obtusa. These are now included in Neonauclea excelsa.

The circumscription of Neonauclea is uncertain. Molecular phylogenetic studies indicate that some related genera are probably embedded in it.

== Species ==
- Neonauclea acuminata Ridsdale
- Neonauclea angustifolia (Havil.) Merr.
- Neonauclea anthraciticus Ridsdale
- Neonauclea artocarpoides Ridsdale
- Neonauclea bartlingii (DC.) Merr.
- Neonauclea bomberaiensis Ridsdale
- Neonauclea borneensis Ridsdale
- Neonauclea brassii S.Moore
- Neonauclea butonensis Ridsdale
- Neonauclea calcarea Ridsdale
- Neonauclea calycina (Bartl. ex DC.) Merr.
- Neonauclea celebica (Havil.) Merr.
- Neonauclea ceramensis Ridsdale
- Neonauclea chalmersii (F.Muell.) Merr.
- Neonauclea circumscissa Ridsdale
- Neonauclea clemensiae Merr. & L.M.Perry
- Neonauclea colla Ridsdale
- Neonauclea connicalycina Ordas, Taradji, Valdez & Alejandro
- Neonauclea coronata Ridsdale
- Neonauclea cyclophylla (Miq.) Merr.
- Neonauclea cyrtopoda (Miq.) Merr.
- Neonauclea endertii Ridsdale
- Neonauclea excelsa (Blume) Merr.
- Neonauclea excelsioides Ridsdale
- Neonauclea formicaria (Elmer) Merr.
- Neonauclea forsteri (Seem. ex Havil.) Merr.
- Neonauclea gageana (King) Merr.
- Neonauclea gigantea (Valeton) Merr.
- Neonauclea glabra (Roxb.) Bakh.f. & Ridsdale
- Neonauclea glandulifera Ridsdale
- Neonauclea griffithii (Hook.f.) Merr.
- Neonauclea hagenii (Lauterb. & K.Schum.) Merr.
- Neonauclea havilandii Koord. ex Ridsdale
- Neonauclea intercontinentalis Bakh.f. & Ridsdale
- Neonauclea jagorii (Merr.) Merr.
- Neonauclea kentii (Merr.) Merr.
- Neonauclea kraboensis Ridsdale
- Neonauclea kranjiensis K.M.Wong & W.W.Seah
- Neonauclea lanceolata (Blume) Merr.
- Neonauclea longipedunculata Merr.
- Neonauclea maluensis (Valeton) S.Moore
- Neonauclea media (Havil.) Merr.
- Neonauclea montana Ridsdale
- Neonauclea morotaiensis Ridsdale
- Neonauclea obversifolia (Valeton) Merr. & L.M.Perry
- Neonauclea pallida (Reinw. ex Havil.) Bakh.f.
- Neonauclea paracyrtopoda Bakh.f. & Ridsdale
- Neonauclea parviflora (Koord. & Valeton) Ridsdale
- Neonauclea perspicuinervia Merr. & L.M.Perry
- Neonauclea pseudoborneensis Ridsdale
- Neonauclea pseudocalycina Ridsdale
- Neonauclea pseudopeduncularis Ridsdale
- Neonauclea puberula (Merr.) Merr.
- Neonauclea purpurea (Roxb.) Merr.
- Neonauclea reticulata (Havil.) Merr.
- Neonauclea rupestris Bakh.f. & Ridsdale
- Neonauclea sericea Ridsdale
- Neonauclea sessilifolia (Roxb.) Merr.
- Neonauclea solomonensis Ridsdale
- Neonauclea subsessilis Ridsdale
- Neonauclea subulifera Ridsdale
- Neonauclea superba (S.Moore) S.Moore
- Neonauclea tricephala Ridsdale
- Neonauclea truncata (Hayata) Yamam.
- Neonauclea tsaiana S.Q.Zou
- Neonauclea unicapitulifera Ridsdale
- Neonauclea ventricosa Ridsdale
- Neonauclea versteeghii Merr. & L.M.Perry
- Neonauclea vinkiorum Ridsdale
- Neonauclea viridiflora Ordas, Banag & Alejandro
- Neonauclea wenzelii (Merr.) Merr.
