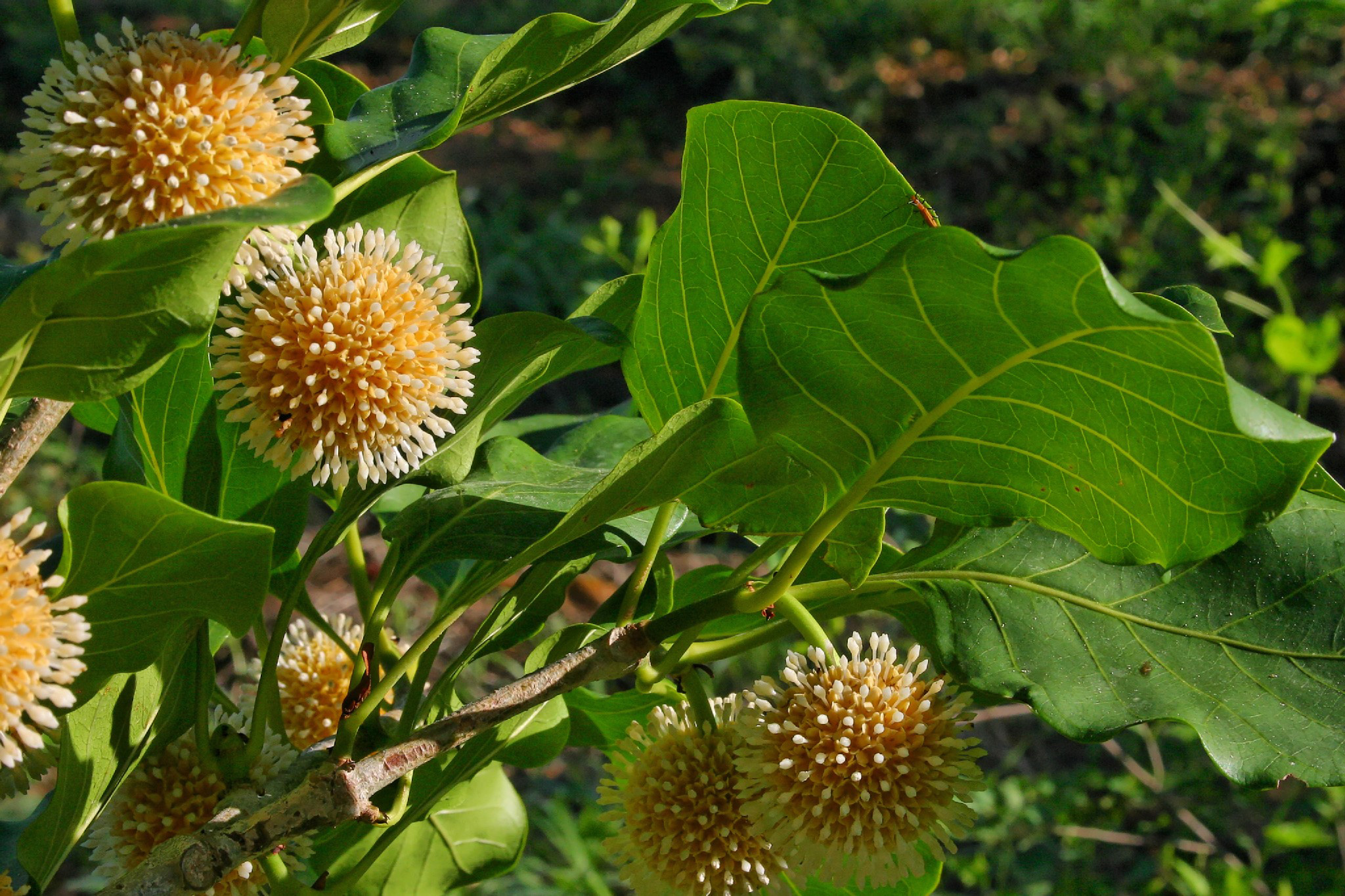
- The Leichhardt tree (Nauclea orientalis)

Scientific classification
- Kingdom: Plantae
- Clade: Tracheophytes
- Clade: Angiosperms
- Clade: Eudicots
- Clade: Asterids
- Order: Gentianales
- Family: Rubiaceae
- Subfamily: Cinchonoideae
- Tribe: Naucleeae; DC. ex Miq.

Type genus
- Nauclea L.

= Naucleeae =

Tribe of plants

Naucleeae is a tribe of flowering plants in the family Rubiaceae and contains about 183 species in 24 genera. Species belonging to Naucleeae occur from Australasia, tropical Asia, Madagascar, tropical Africa, and to the Neotropics and North America.

== Genera ==
Currently accepted names

- Adina Salisb. (4 sp)
- Adinauclea Ridsdale (1 sp)
- Breonadia Ridsdale (1 sp)
- Breonia A.Rich. ex DC. (20 sp)
- Burttdavya Hoyle (1 sp)
- Cephalanthus L. (6 sp)
- Corynanthe Welw., including Pausinystalia Pierre ex Beille (8 sp)
- Gyrostipula J.-F.Leroy (3 sp)
- Haldina Ridsdale (1 sp)
- Janotia J.-F.Leroy (1 sp)
- Ludekia Ridsdale (2 sp)
- Mitragyna Korth. (7 sp)
- Myrmeconauclea Merr. (4 sp)
- Nauclea L. (10 sp)
- Neolamarckia Bosser (2 sp)
- Neonauclea Merr. (68 sp)
- Ochreinauclea Ridsdale & Bakh.f. (2 sp)
- Pertusadina Ridsdale (4 sp)
- Sarcocephalus Afzel. ex R.Br. (2 sp)
- Sinoadina Ridsdale (1 sp)
- Uncaria Schreb. (40 sp)

Synonyms

- Fleroya Y.F.Deng = Mitragyna
- Hallea J.-F.Leroy = Mitragyna
- Metadina Ridsdale = Adina
- Pseudocinchona A.Chev. ex Perrot = Corynanthe
