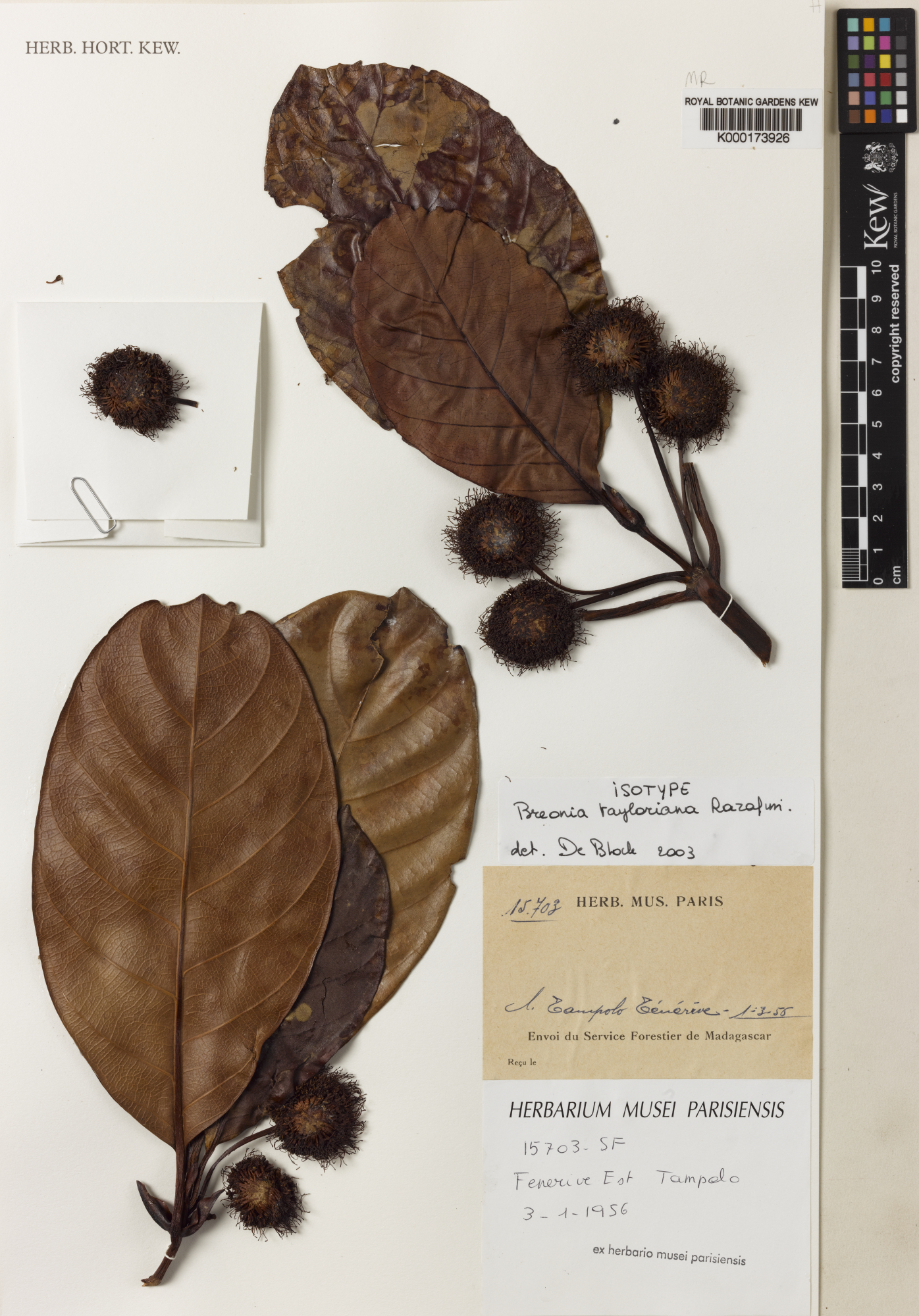
- Isotype of Breonia tayloriana, deposited in the herbarium of the Royal Botanic Gardens, Kew (barcode: K000173926)

Scientific classification
- Kingdom: Plantae
- Clade: Tracheophytes
- Clade: Angiosperms
- Clade: Eudicots
- Clade: Asterids
- Order: Gentianales
- Family: Rubiaceae
- Subfamily: Cinchonoideae
- Tribe: Naucleeae
- Genus: Breonia; A.Rich. ex DC.

Type species
- Breonia madagascariensis A.Rich. ex DC.

Synonyms
- Anthocephalus A.Rich.; Cephalidium A.Rich.; Elattospermum Soler.; Franchetia Baill.; Neobreonia Ridsdale; Samama Rumph. ex Kuntze, nom. illeg.

= Breonia =

Genus of plants

Breonia is a genus of flowering plants in the family Rubiaceae. It is endemic to Madagascar. Most species are trees, rarely shrubs.

== Species ==
- Breonia boivinii^{(Wikispecies)} Havil.
- Breonia capuronii^{(Wikispecies)} Razafim.
- Breonia chinensis^{(Wikispecies)} (Lam.) Capuron – Bur-flower tree
- Breonia cuspidata^{(Wikispecies)} (Baker) Havil.
- Breonia decaryana^{(Wikispecies)} Homolle
- Breonia fragifera^{(Wikispecies)} Capuron ex Razafim.
- Breonia havilandiana^{(Wikispecies)} Homolle
- Breonia louvelii^{(Wikispecies)} Homolle
- Breonia lowryi^{(Wikispecies)} Razafim.
- Breonia macrocarpa^{(Wikispecies)} Homolle
- Breonia madagascariensis A.Rich. ex DC.
- Breonia membranacea^{(Wikispecies)} Havil.
- Breonia perrieri^{(Wikispecies)} Homolle
- Breonia richardsonii^{(Wikispecies)} Razafim.
- Breonia sambiranensis^{(Wikispecies)} Razafim.
- Breonia sphaerantha^{(Wikispecies)} (Baill.) Homolle ex Ridsdale
- Breonia stipulata^{(Wikispecies)} Havil.
- Breonia taolagnaroensis^{(Wikispecies)} Razafim.
- Breonia tayloriana^{(Wikispecies)} Razafim.
- Breonia tsaratananensis^{(Wikispecies)} Razafim.
