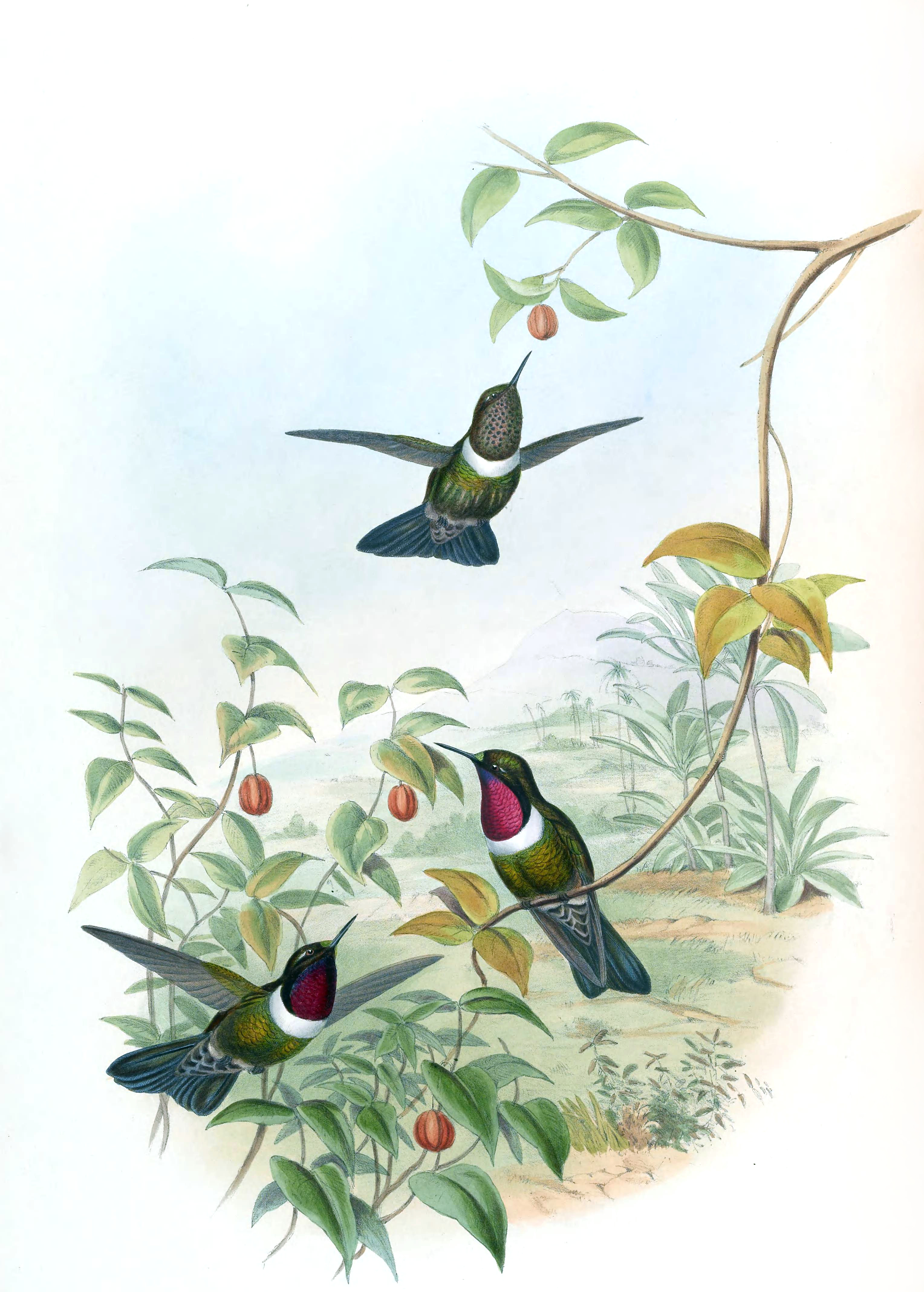

Conservation status
- Least Concern (IUCN 3.1)
- CITES Appendix II

Scientific classification
- Kingdom: Animalia
- Phylum: Chordata
- Class: Aves
- Order: Apodiformes
- Family: Trochilidae
- Genus: Heliangelus
- Species: H. spencei

Binomial name
- Heliangelus spencei (Bourcier, 1847)

Synonyms
- Heliangelus amethysticollis spencei

= Mérida sunangel =

Species of hummingbird

The Mérida sunangel (Heliangelus spencei) is a species of hummingbird in the "coquettes", tribe Lesbiini of subfamily Lesbiinae. It is endemic to Venezuela.

== Taxonomy and systematics ==
The taxonomy of the Merida sunangel is not settled. The International Ornithological Committee (IOC), the Clements taxonomy, and BirdLife International's Handbook of the Birds of the World (HBW) treat it as a species. The South American Classification Committee (SACC) of the American Ornithological Society treats it as a subspecies of the amethyst-throated sunangel (H. amethysticollis).

== Description ==
The Merida sunangel is 10 to 11 cm (3.9 to 4.3 in) long. It has a straight black bill. The adult male has a pale blue frontlet just above the bill, a dark green crown, and shining green upperparts. The face has black ear coverts. Its throat and upper breast gorget is glittering purple with pinkish scales and has a white pectoral band below it. The rest of the underparts are yellowish to pale buff with round green spots. The central tail feathers are dark green and the outer feathers blackish, occasionally with pale tips. The adult female has less black on the face. Its throat is maroon with white and green scaling. Its underparts have fewer green spots than the male's and appears more yellowish. Juveniles are thought to resemble the female.

== Distribution and habitat ==
The Merida sunangel is found only in the Andes of Mérida state in northwestern Venezuela. It inhabits rather open landscapes such as shrubby forest edges, openings within forest, and brushy pastures. In elevation it ranges between 2,000 and 3,600 m (6,600 and 11,800 ft).

== Behavior ==
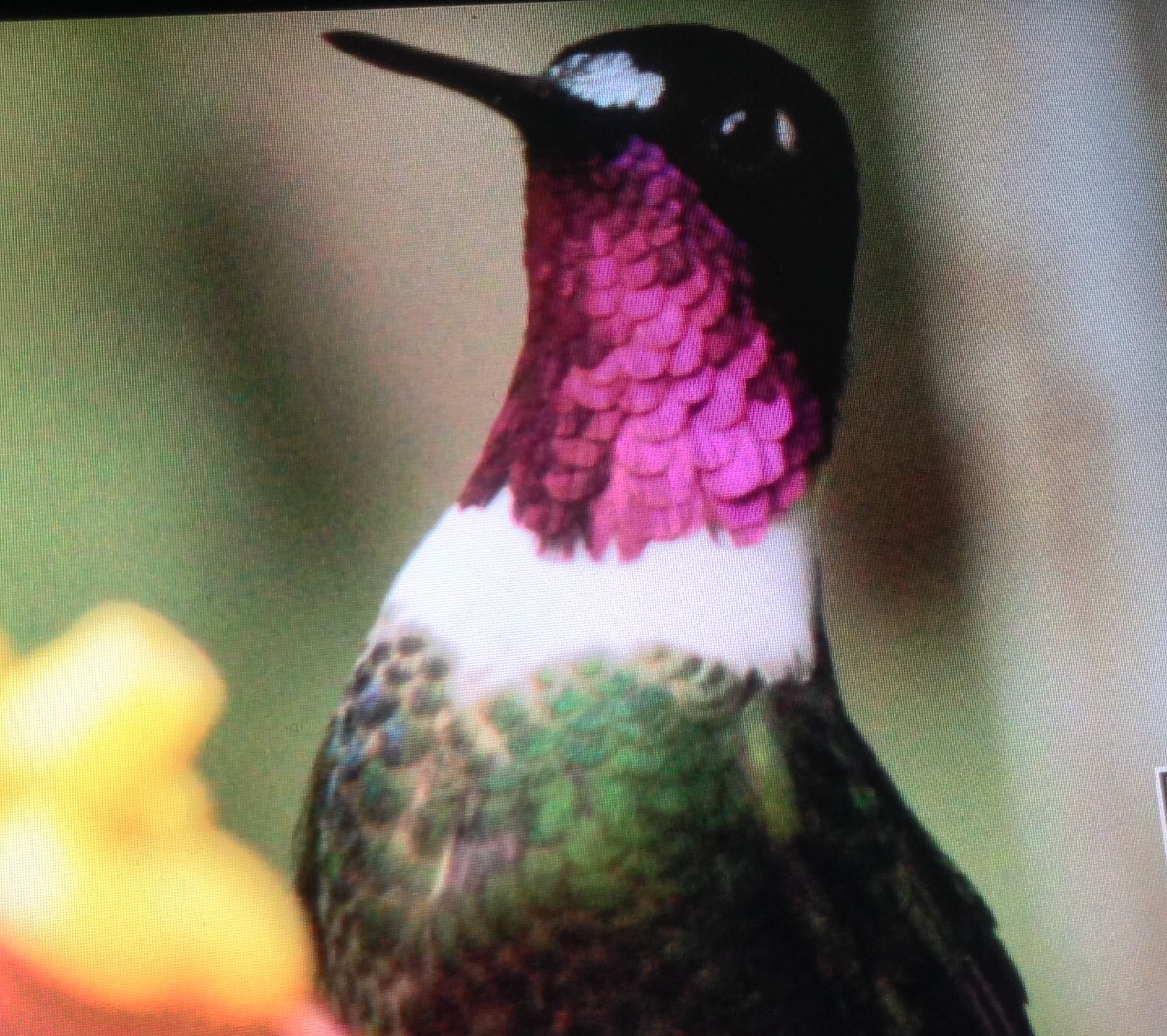
Live bird

=== Movement ===
The Merida sunangel is sedentary.

=== Feeding ===
Little is known about the Merida sunangel's feeding habits and diet, but they are believed to essentially the same as those of its close relative, Longuemare's sunangel (H. clarisse). That species feeds on nectar and also includes insects in its diet. It defends feeding territories that are dense with nectar sources. It typically feeds at heights up to 6 m (20 ft), often along streams. It captures insects by hawking from a perch.

=== Breeding ===
The only known Merida sunangel nest was found in June. It was a downy cup perched on a small root under an overhang in a road cut. It held two white eggs. Nothing else is known about the species' breeding phenology.

=== Vocalization ===
The Merida sunangel's call is "a repeated, high-pitched, cricket-like, short trill" that is given both while perched and in flight.

== Status ==
The IUCN has assessed the Merida sunangel as being of Least Concern, though its population size and trend are not known. It has a small range but about 3/5 of it is within protected areas. The principal threats are "expansion of agricultural frontier and habitat fragmentation."
