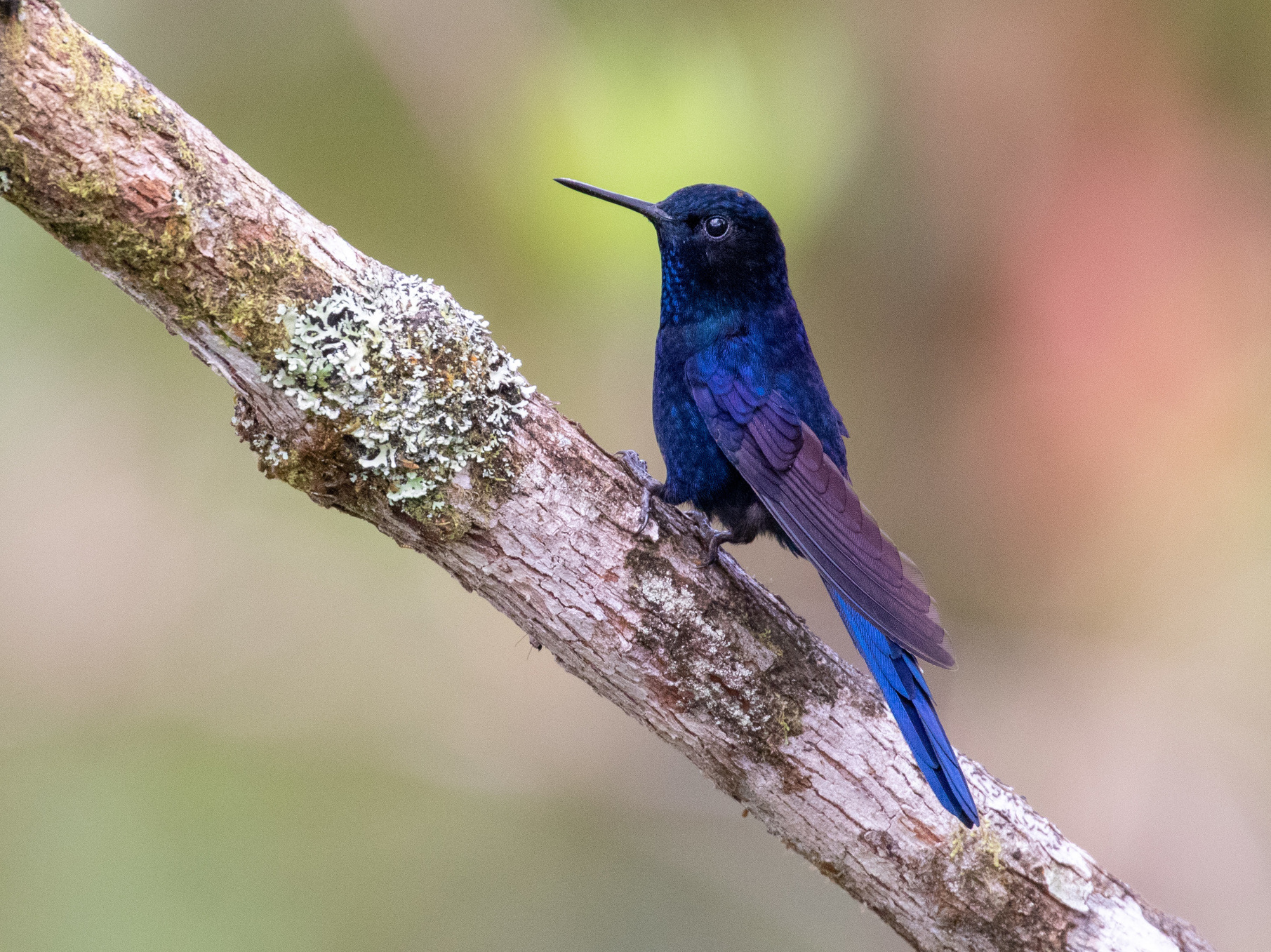

Conservation status
- Near Threatened (IUCN 3.1)
- CITES Appendix II (CITES)

Scientific classification
- Kingdom: Animalia
- Phylum: Chordata
- Class: Aves
- Clade: Strisores
- Order: Apodiformes
- Family: Trochilidae
- Genus: Heliangelus
- Species: H. regalis

Binomial name
- Heliangelus regalis Fitzpatrick, Willard & Terborgh, 1979

= Royal sunangel =

Species of hummingbird

The royal sunangel (Heliangelus regalis) is an endangered species of hummingbird in the "coquettes", tribe Lesbiini of subfamily Lesbiinae. It is found in Ecuador and Peru.

== Taxonomy and systematics ==
The royal sunangel was originally described in 1979 as monotypic. In 2011 a second subspecies, H. r. johnsoni, was described and was accepted by major taxonomic systems.

== Description ==
The royal sunangel is 10 to 12 cm (3.9 to 4.7 in) long and weighs 3.4 to 4.5 g (0.12 to 0.16 oz). Its black bill is short and straight. Both subspecies are strongly sexually dichromatic. The adult males are unique among genus Heliangelus: Their bodies are entirely dark blue. The nominate's plumage is slightly shiny, with significant iridescence only on its forecrown (just above the bill). H. r. johnsoni is intensely iridescent all over and especially so on the crown, throat, and upper breast. The male nominate's tail is dark metallic violet-purple and that of johnsoni is metallic indigo. Both males' tails are deeply forked.

Adult females of the two subspecies are similar to those of the rest of genus Heliangelus and differ only slightly between them. They are dark green above and rich cinnamon with bronzy green discs below. A buffy breastband separates the throat and chest. Their tails are not as deeply forked as those of the males. The nominate female's tail is blue-black and that of johnsoni is metallic indigo like that of the male. Juveniles are like the females but with gray spots instead of green on the throat. The amount of blue in males increases with age and typically the gorget is the first area to achieve it.

== Distribution and habitat ==
The nominate subspecies of royal sunangel is mostly found in the Cordillera del Cóndor of Peru's Cajamarca and Amazonas departments, and also on the east slope of the Andes in Peru's departments of San Martín and Loreto. It was first documented in extreme southeastern Ecuador's Zamora-Chinchipe Province in 2008. H. r. johnsoni is found only in the Cordillera Azul of northern Peru.

The royal sunangel inhabits a few specialized landscapes. It is most numerous in "elfin scrub", a rather dry grassland habitat with mossy stunted forest and small bushes that forms the transition between dry savannah and humid elfin forest. It is also found in steep wooded ravines, and in Ecuador is most numerous on sandstone ridges with páramo-like vegetation but also in medium-elevation forest. The species is most abundant between 1,500 and 2,200 m (4,900 and 7,200 ft) of elevation. It has been documented as low as 1,250 m (4,100 ft) and there are sight records between 550 and 700 m (1,800 and 2,300 ft) in Peru.

== Behavior ==
=== Movement ===
The royal sunangel's movements have not been documented but seasonal altitudinal changes are likely. Outside the breeding season it seems that females tend to occur at lower elevations than males.

=== Feeding ===
The royal sunangel feeds on nectar and insects. Several flowering plants, shrubs, and small trees have been identified as nectar sources. Males are highly territorial at flowering bushes. Both sexes often feed by perching on a flower rather than hovering, and they have been observed "robbing" nectar from holes pierced by other birds. They capture insects by hawking from a perch and by gleaning from vegetation.

=== Breeding ===
The few records suggest that the royal sunangel's breeding season is from July to September. The clutch of two white eggs is incubated by the female. Nothing else is known about the species' breeding phenology and no nest has been described.

=== Vocalization ===
The royal sunangel has a wide variety of vocalizations. During aerial displays males give "a series of emphatic 'tseep' notes". Two agonistic males "uttered an endless, thin, high-pitched jumble of 'jijijit'jijit'jijit'jijiji…' notes". Calls given while feeding are "a repeated short dry and emphatis 'tsik' or 'tsawk'". One male gave "a sharp, high-pitched, fast 'chichúp chúp!'" and a female "a thin, high-pitched 'tziíp!'".

== Status ==
The IUCN assesses the royal sunangel as near threatened. It has a highly fragmented range, with a documented presence at fewer than 10 locations, and its specialized habitat is under threat from cultivation and deforestation.
