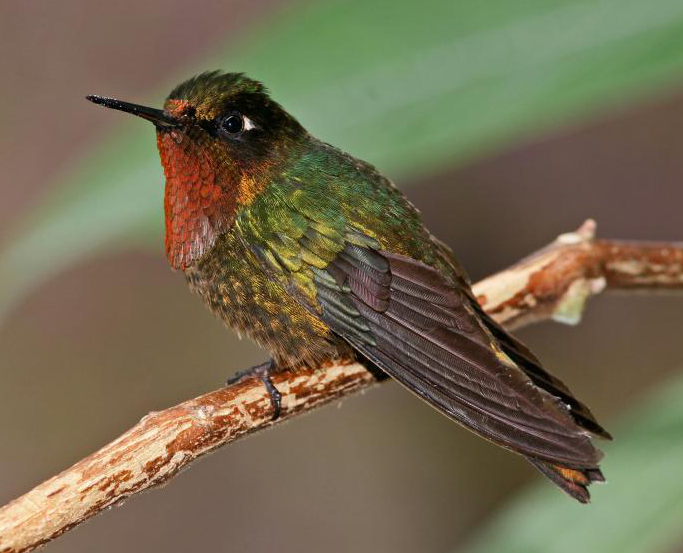
- Heliangelus mavors

Scientific classification
- Kingdom: Animalia
- Phylum: Chordata
- Class: Aves
- Order: Apodiformes
- Family: Trochilidae
- Tribe: Lesbiini
- Genus: Heliangelus; Gould, 1848

Type species
- Ornismya clarisse Longuemare, 1841

= Sunangel =

Genus of birds

The sunangels are a genus of hummingbirds, Heliangelus, found in montane South America.

== Taxonomy ==
The genus Heliangelus was introduced in 1848 by the English ornithologist John Gould. The genus name combines the Ancient Greek ἡλιος/hēlios meaning "sun" with αγγελος/angelos meaning "angel". Gould did not specify a type species but in 1855 George Gray designated the type as Trochilus clarissae Longuemare which is Ornismya clarisse Longuemare, 1841, Longuemare's sunangel.

The genus contains the following nine species:

Genus Heliangelus – Gould, 1848 – nine species
Common name	Scientific name and subspecies	Range	Size and ecology	IUCN status and estimated population
Orange-throated sunangel	Heliangelus mavors Gould, 1848	Colombia and Venezuela	Size: Habitat: Diet:	LC
Amethyst-throated sunangel	Heliangelus amethysticollis (d'Orbigny & Lafresnaye, 1838) Four subspecies: H. a. laticlavius, Salvin (1891); H. a. decolor, Zimmer, JT (1951); H. a. apurimacensis, Weller (2009); H. a. amethysticollis, d'Orbigny & Lafresnaye (1838)	south Ecuador to northwest Bolivia	Size: Habitat: Diet:	LC
Longuemare's sunangel	Heliangelus clarisse (Longuemare, 1841) Three subspecies: H. c. violiceps Phelps, WH Sr & Phelps, WH Jr, 1953; H. c. verdiscutus Phelps, WH Sr & Phelps, WH Jr, 1955; H. c. clarisse (de Longuemare, G, 1841)	east Colombia and west Venezuela	Size: Habitat: Diet:	LC
Merida sunangel	Heliangelus spencei (Bourcier, 1847)	Mérida (northwest Venezuela)	Size: Habitat: Diet:	LC
Gorgeted sunangel	Heliangelus strophianus (Gould, 1846)	southwest Colombia and northwest Ecuador	Size: Habitat: Diet:	LC
Tourmaline sunangel	Heliangelus exortis (Fraser, 1840)	Colombia and northwest Ecuador	Size: Habitat: Diet:	LC
Flame-throated sunangel	Heliangelus micraster Gould, 1872 Two subspecies: H. m. micraster; H. m. cutervensis	Ecuador and Peru	Size: Habitat: Diet:	LC
Purple-throated sunangel	Heliangelus viola Gould, 1853 Three subspecies: H. v. viola; H. v. pyropus; H. v. splendidus	Ecuador and Peru	Size: Habitat: Diet:	LC
Royal sunangel	Heliangelus regalis Fitzpatrick, Willard & Terborgh, 1979 Two subspecies: H. r. johnsoni; H. r. regalis	north Peru	Size: Habitat: Diet:	NT

The Bogotá sunangel was formerly placed in this genus. It is regarded as a hybrid specimen by AviList based on a study published in 2018 by Jorge Pérez-Emán and colleagues.
