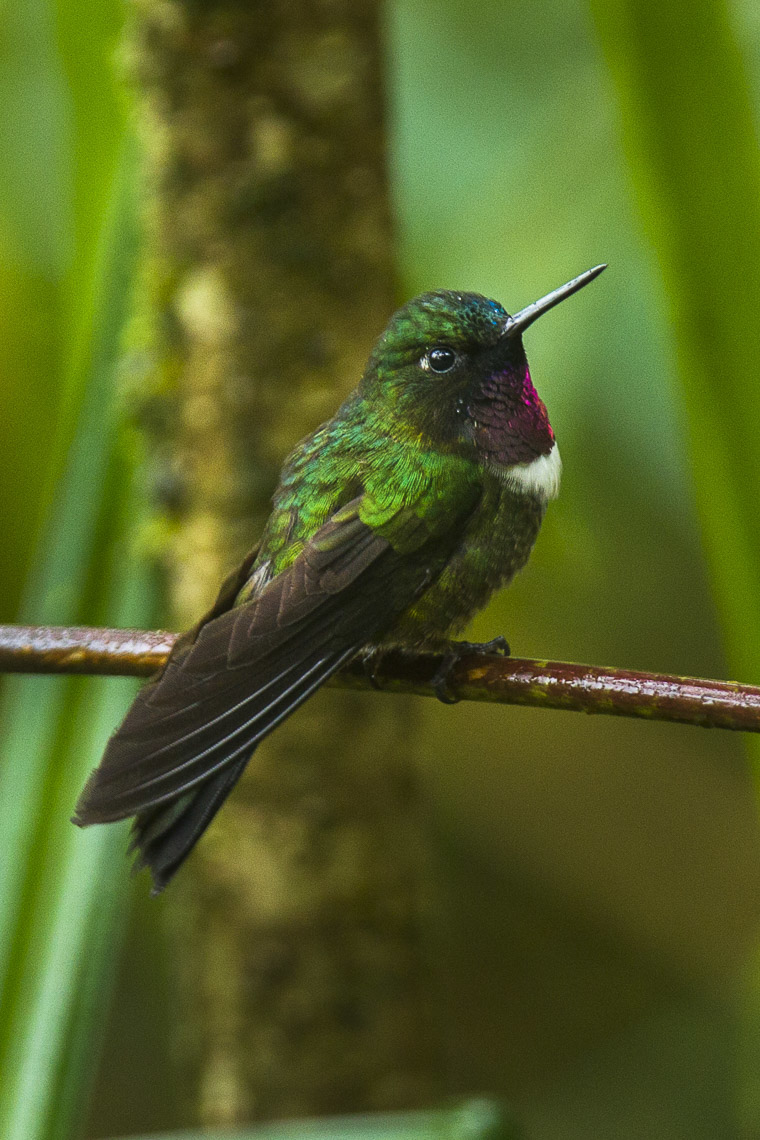

Conservation status
- Least Concern (IUCN 3.1)
- CITES Appendix II

Scientific classification
- Kingdom: Animalia
- Phylum: Chordata
- Class: Aves
- Order: Apodiformes
- Family: Trochilidae
- Genus: Heliangelus
- Species: H. amethysticollis

Binomial name
- Heliangelus amethysticollis (d'Orbigny & Lafresnaye, 1838)

Synonyms
- Heliangelus laticlavius

= Amethyst-throated sunangel =

Species of humminigbird

The amethyst-throated sunangel (Heliangelus amethysticollis) is a species of hummingbird in the "coquettes", tribe Lesbiini of subfamily Lesbiinae. It is found in Bolivia, Ecuador, and Peru.

== Taxonomy and systematics ==
The amethyst-throated sunangel's taxonomy is not settled. The International Ornithological Committee (IOC), BirdLife International's Handbook of the Birds of the World (HBW), and the Clements taxonomy assign these four subspecies to it:

- H. a. laticlavius, Salvin (1891)
- H. a. decolor, Zimmer, JT (1951)
- H. a. apurimacensis, Weller (2009)
- H. a. amethysticollis, d'Orbigny & Lafresnaye (1838)

The South American Classification Committee (SACC) of the American Ornithological Society includes three other subspecies. They are H. a. violiceps and H. a. clarisse that IOC, HBW, and the Clements taxonomy treat as Longuemare's sunangel (H. clarisse) and H. a. spencei that they treat as the Mérida sunangel (H. spencei).

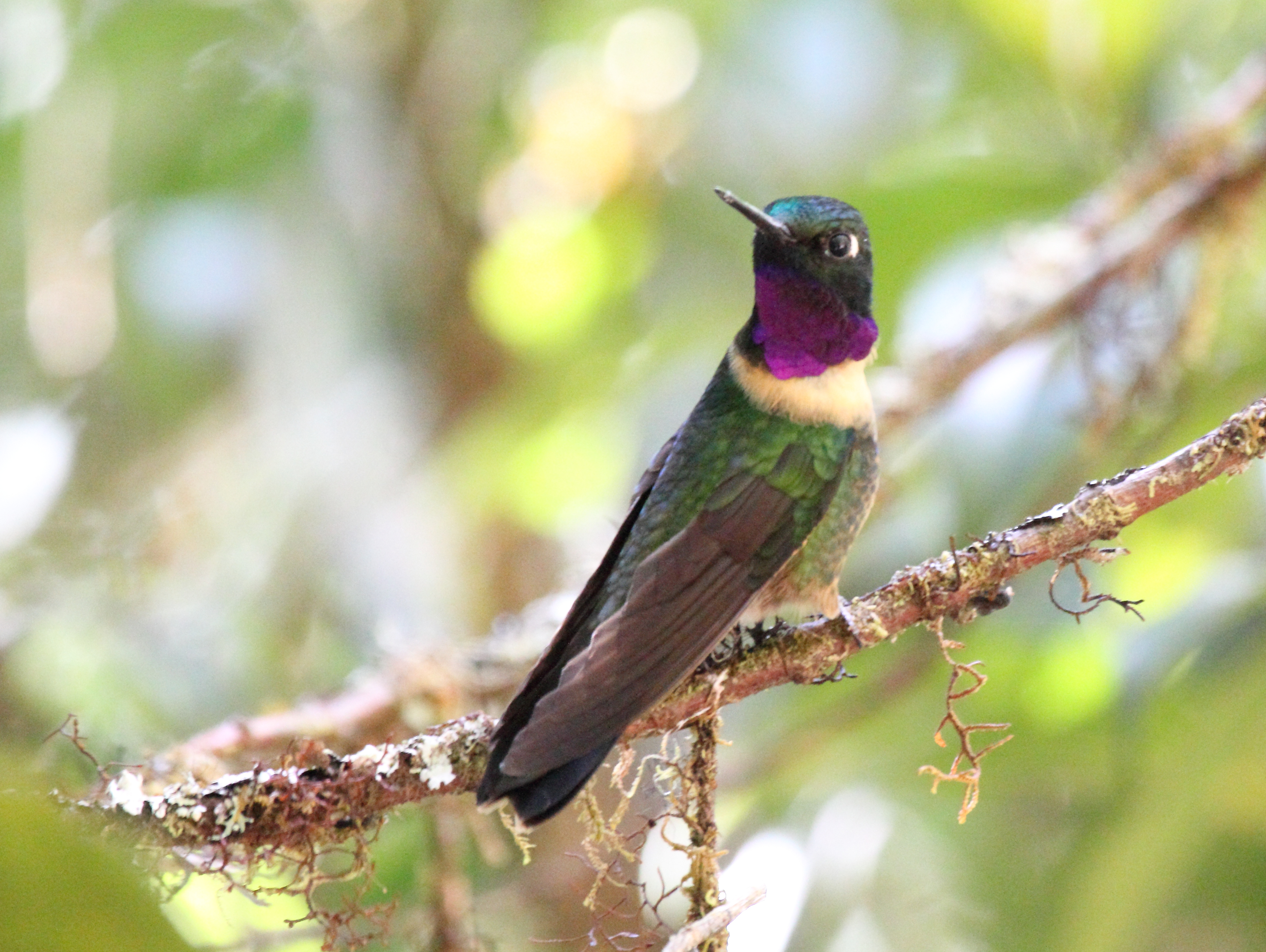
Peru, 2013

== Description ==
The amethyst-throated sunangel, as defined by the IOC, is about 10 cm (3.9 in) long and weighs 3.8 to 7.7 g (0.13 to 0.27 oz). The species has a straight, rather short, black bill. The adult male of nominate subspecies H. a. amethysticollis has shiny dark green upperparts with a bright green frontlet just above the bill. Its throat and upper breast gorget is rosy amethyst. That area has a narrow black border on the neck and a broader cinnamon band below it. The lower breast is glittery green and the rest of the underparts buff with green discs. The central tail feathers are bronze-green and the outer ones blue-black. The adult female is similar to the male but has a rusty throat with black flecks. Immatures are similar to the female.

Subspecies H. a. laticlavius has a reddish purple gorget, a whitish breastband, and a buffy grayish belly. H. a. decolor has a paler frontlet than the nominate; its gorget is a deeper violet, its breast band whiter, and its belly grayer. H. a. apurimacensis has a turquoise-green frontlet, a whitish buff breast, and a pale buff belly.

== Distribution and habitat ==
The four subspecies of amethyst-throated sunangel are found thus:

- H. a. laticlavius, the Andes of southern Ecuador south to northern Department of Cajamarca in Peru
- H. a. decolor, the eastern slope of the Andes in central Peru from south of the Marañón River to the Department of Junín
- H. a. apurimacensis, the valleys of the Apurímac River and upper Urubamba River in the departments of Ayacucho and Cusco, southeastern Peru
- H. a. amethysticollis, the eastern slope of the Andes from southern Peru into northwestern Bolivia as far as Cochabamba Department

The species inhabits wet and humid montane forest including cloudforest and elfin forest. Though it is found at forest edges and open bushy terrain, it prefers the interior of closed forest. In elevation it mostly ranges between 1,800 and 3,200 m (5,900 and 10,500 ft) but has been often recorded as high as 3,700 m (12,100 ft) in Peru.

== Behavior ==
=== Movement ===
The amethyst-throated sunangel is sedentary.

=== Feeding ===
The amethyst-throated sunangel feeds on nectar and also includes a high percentage of insects in its diet. It defends feeding territories that are dense with nectar sources; with its short bill it primarily feeds at flowers with shallow corollas. It typically feeds at heights up to 6 m (20 ft) and always near cover at the forest edge or interior. It captures insects by hawking from a perch.

=== Breeding ===
The amethyst-throated sunangel nests in Peru during February and March. It builds a nest of fine plant fiber, moss, and lichens attached to a strand of moss dangling from a branch. It typically places it about 1.5 m (5 ft) above ground and under a leaf or clump of moss that shelters it from weather. The clutch of two eggs is incubated by the female, who first breeds in her second year. The incubation period and time to fledging are not known.

=== Vocalization ===
The amethyst-throated sunangel's call is "a short, buzzy, dry trill...repeated at intervals."

== Status ==
The IUCN has assessed the amethyst-throated sunangel as being of Least Concern. Its population size is not known but is believed to be stable. It is fairly common overall, locally abundant, and occurs in several protected areas.
