= Charles Parzudaki =

Ottoman-French ornithologist and natural history dealer (1806–1889)

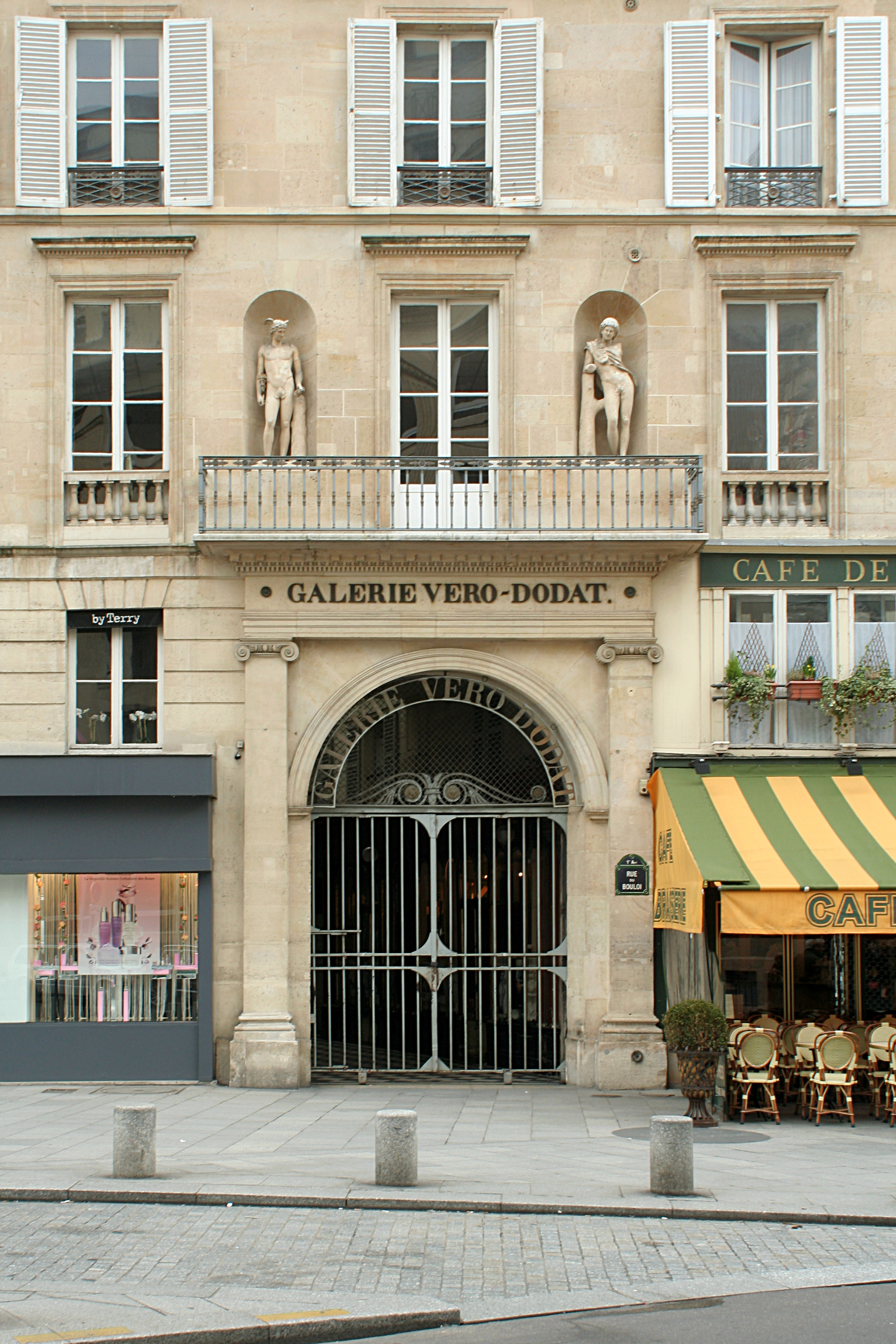
2 rue Bouloi as it is today

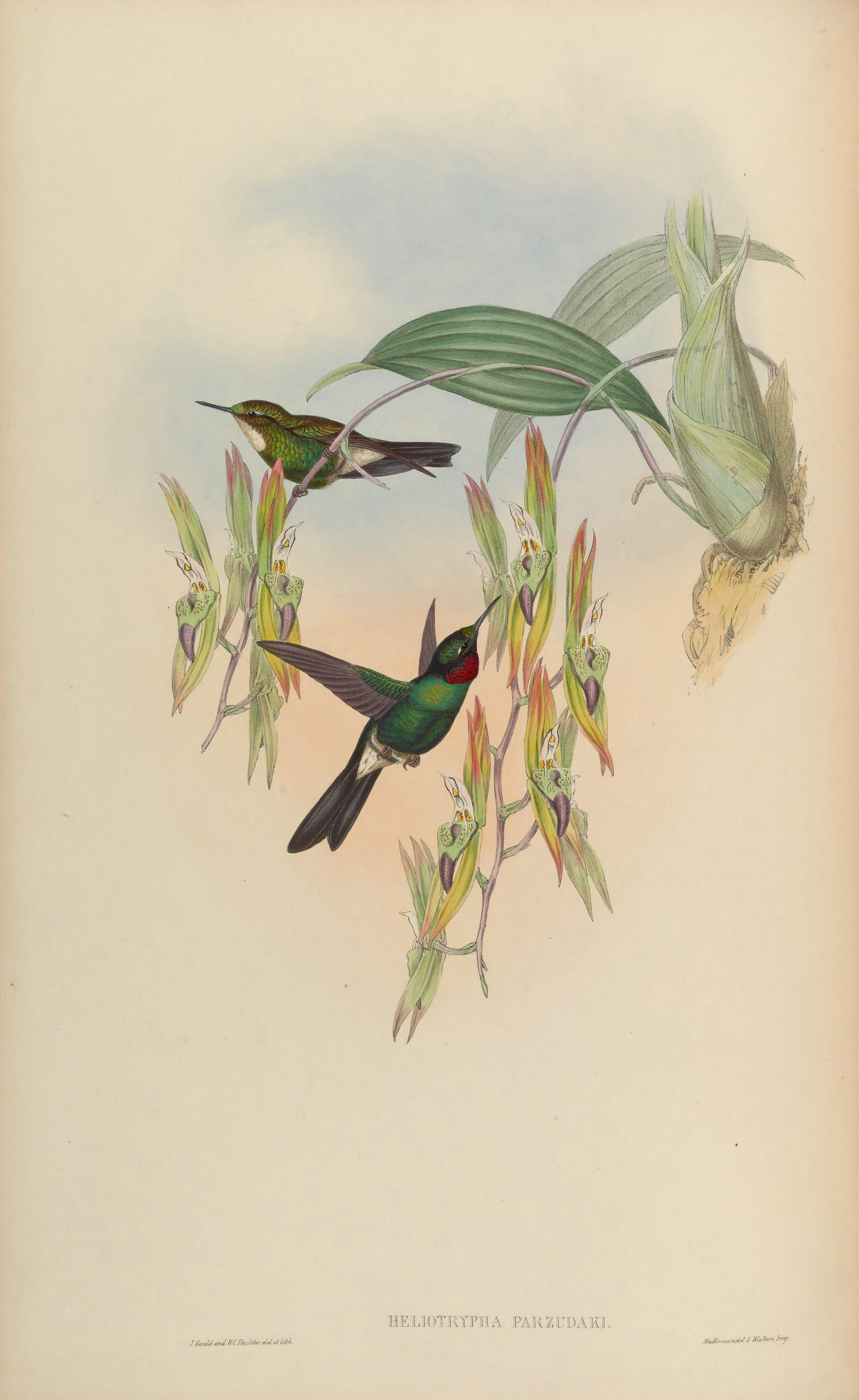
Heliotrypha parzudaki illustrated by John Gould

Charles Parzudaki (7 May 1806 Chania – 30 December 1889 Nointel, Oise) was an Ottoman-French ornithologist and natural history dealer. Charles Parzudaki was awarded for his outstanding taxidermic exhibits, which he exhibited at the Exposition publique des produits de l'industrie française, in 1839, 1844 and 1849. Around 1839 he began a natural goods trade at 2 rue Bouloi fr in Paris, which he later ran together with his stepson Émile until about 1864. To improve their exhibits, they had the support of artists such as Elie Maillard (1838–1887), who repainted the glass eyes of the bird mounts and the sculptor Jules Dalou (1838–1902), who replaced the usual stuffing materials with clay.

Private collectors such as John Gould, Frédéric de Lafresnaye, Philip Lutley Sclater, George Loddiges, Thomas Campbell Eyton, Thomas Powys, 4th Baron Lilford and Louis Antoine François Baillon also purchased skins from Magasin Parzudaki. Even though the core competence of the house was birds, it also dealt in bird eggs,shells, insects, scorpions, amphibians and mammals. Many of its birds led to new first descriptions, and there were also some specimens of species that are now considered extinct. Charles himself described Eriocnemis isaacsonii in 1845, a species that is now considered extinct or hybrid. In 1840, Parzudaki (as Parzudhaki) was introduced by Jean Baptiste Alexandre André Esprit Ricord (1792–1876) as member number 185 of the Société Cuvierienne and Parzudaki presented Gustav Hartlaub as a new member of the society. Between 1841 and 1849, Parzudaki published six articles on new bird species in Revue Zoologique par La Société Cuvierienne, Magasin de zoologie, d'anatomie comparée et de palaeontologie and Revue et magasin de zoologie pure et appliquée. He was the first to describe Manacus candei (1841), Oxypogon lindenii (1845)) and Iodopleura isabellae (1847).

In 1843, Lafresnaye honored him in the name of the Flame-faced tanager (Tangara parzudakii). René Primevère Lesson named two species of hummingbird after Parzudaki. In 1838 he described Ornismya Parzudhaki, a name that is now synonymous with the Cuban Emerald Hummingbird (Riccordia ricordii) (Gervais, 1835), and in 1840 Ornismya Parzudaki, a name that is now synonymous with the Tourmaline sunangel (Heliangelus exortis). In 1854, Heinrich Gottlieb Ludwig Reichenbach introduced the genus Parzudakia, a synonym for Heliangelus Gould, 1848. Since he placed Lessons Ornismya Parzudaki in the genus, the genus name is probably originally derived from the species name, but is not a further dedication

== Works ==
- 1841 Manakin nouveau, découvert par M. de Maussion Candé Revue Zoologique par La Société Cuvierienne 1841: 306 biodiversitylibrary.org
- 1843 Manakin nouveau, découvert par M. de Maussion Candé Magasin de zoologie, d’anatomie comparée et de palaeontologie 2, 5 Plate 45 and Text biodiversitylibrary.org
- 1845 Nouvelle espèce d’Oiseau-Mouche Revue Zoologique par La Société Cuvierienne 7: 95 biodiversitylibrary.org
- 1845 Nouvelle espèce d’Oiseau-Mouche Revue Zoologique par La Société Cuvierienne 7:253 biodiversitylibrary.org
- 1847 Description d’une nouvelle espèce du genre Iodopleurus (Lesson) Revue Zoologique par La Société Cuvierienne 9:186 biodiversitylibrary.org
- 1849 Description et figure d’une espèce D’Oiseaux-Mouche de la Républiques du Venezuela Revue et magasin de zoologie pure et appliquée 2, 1: 273-274 biodiversitylibrary.org
