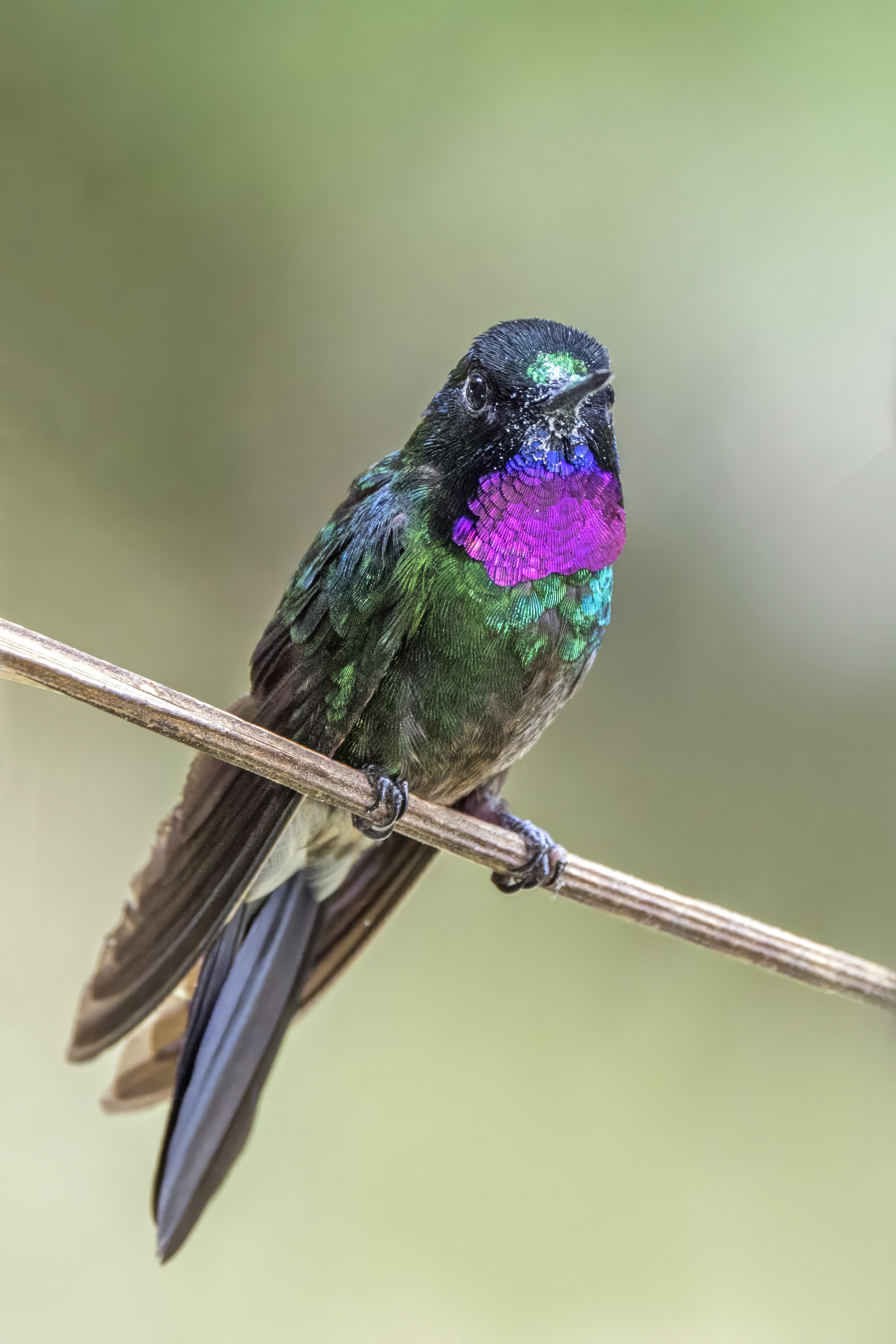
- male in Colombia
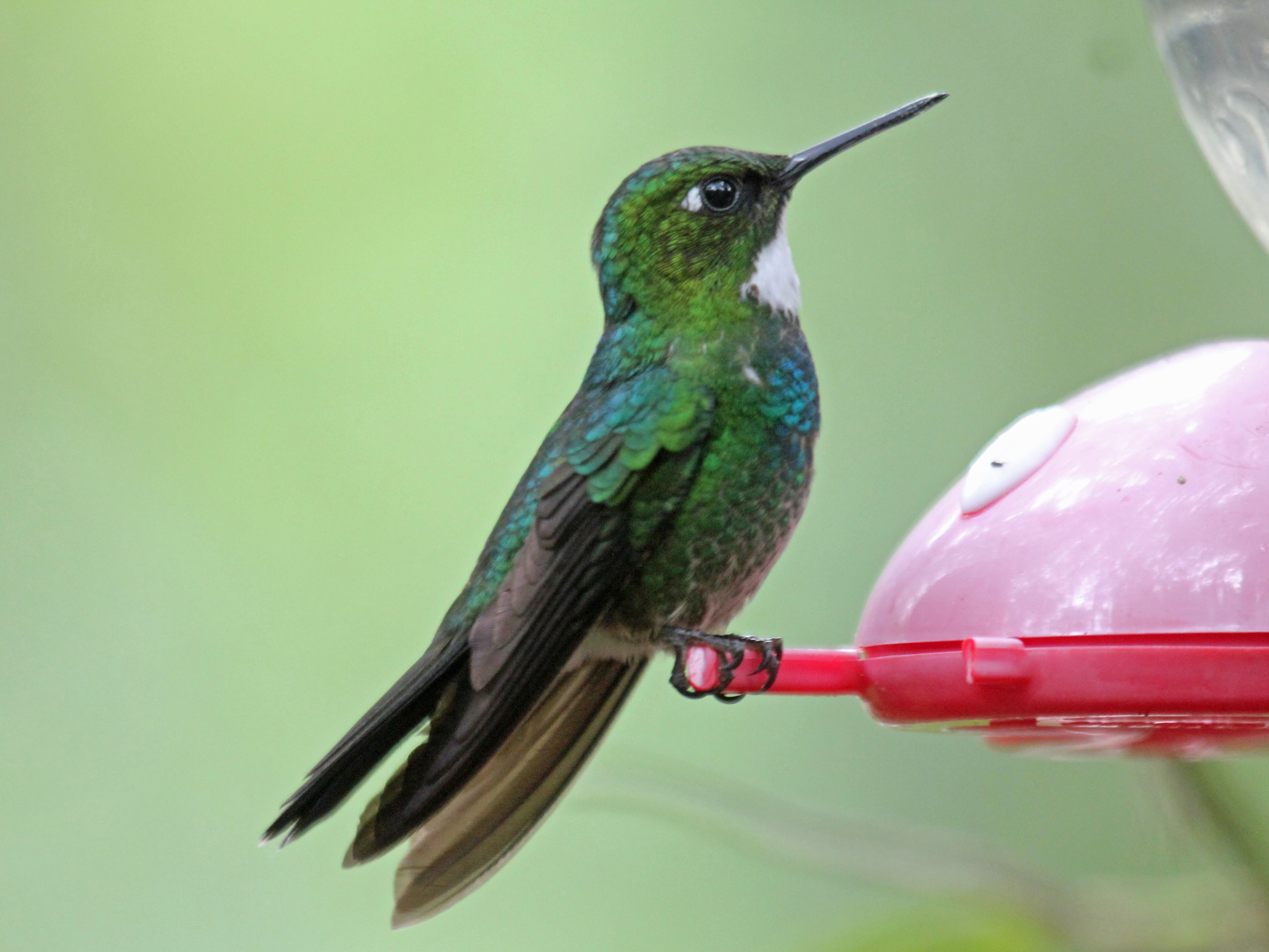
- female in Ecuador

Conservation status
- Least Concern (IUCN 3.1)
- CITES Appendix II (CITES)

Scientific classification
- Kingdom: Animalia
- Phylum: Chordata
- Class: Aves
- Clade: Strisores
- Order: Apodiformes
- Family: Trochilidae
- Genus: Heliangelus
- Species: H. exortis

Binomial name
- Heliangelus exortis (Fraser, 1840)

= Tourmaline sunangel =

Species of hummingbird

The tourmaline sunangel (Heliangelus exortis) is a species of hummingbird in the "coquettes", tribe Lesbiini of subfamily Lesbiinae. It is found in Colombia and Ecuador.

== Taxonomy and systematics ==
The tourmaline sunangel is monotypic. However, at times it has been considered conspecific with the flame-throated sunangel (H. micraster).

== Description ==
The tourmaline sunangel is 10 to 11 cm (3.9 to 4.3 in) long. Males weigh 3.5 to 8.5 g (0.12 to 0.30 oz) and females 4 to 5.2 g (0.14 to 0.18 oz). Their bill is blackish, straight, and of medium length. Both sexes have dark shining green upperparts and dusky gray underparts with round green spots. Their tails' central feathers are dark bronze and the others blackish. Adult males have a glittering green frontlet just above the bill, a dark purple-blue chin, and a glittering rosy pink gorget with a glittering emerald green border below it. Adult females lack the green frontlet, their chin is blackish, and their throat whitish with green to dusky speckles and sometimes a few glittering rosy feathers. Juveniles are like the adult female but the male has a white chin.

== Distribution and habitat ==
The tourmaline sunangel is found in all three Andes ranges of Colombia and south on the eastern slope to Ecuador's Morona-Santiago Province. It inhabits the interior and edges of humid to wet premontane forest, especially cloudforest and elfin forest. It also occurs in bushy clearings and shrubby pastures. In elevation it mainly ranges between 2,300 and 3,400 m (7,500 and 11,200 ft) but is found as low as 1,500 m (4,900 ft).

== Behavior ==
=== Movement ===
The tourmaline sunangel is almost entirely sendentary but in Colombia makes occasional movements into the tropical zone.

=== Feeding ===
The tourmaline sunangel is aggressively territorial at feeding locations. It takes nectar from a variety of flowering plants, usually those low to the ground both in semi-open landscapes and within the forest. It usually clings to flowers to feed rather than hovering at them. It captures insects by hawking from a perch and by gleaning from vegetation.

=== Breeding ===
The tourmaline sunangel's breeding season appears to span from March to August. The clutch of two white eggs is incubated by the female. Nothing else is known about the species' breeding phenology.

=== Vocalization ===
A vocalization believed to be the tourmaline sunangel's song is "a repeated series of single notes...typically a few high-pitched upslurred notes followed by a slightly lower-pitched downslurred note, 'suwee....suwee..tsew...suwee...tsew...'." Its call is "a short dry gravelly trill 'trrr', repeated at intervals" and it also makes a continuous dry chatter.

== Status ==
The IUCN has assessed the tourmaline sunangel as being of Least Concern. Its population size is not known but is believed to be stable. It is locally fairly common and occurs in several protected areas.
