= Nointel =

Nointel may refer to:

- Nointel, Oise, a commune in the Oise department, France
- Nointel, Val-d'Oise, a commune in the Val-d'Oise department, France

== See also ==
- Charles Marie François Olier, marquis de Nointel (1635—1685), French ambassador to the Ottoman court
