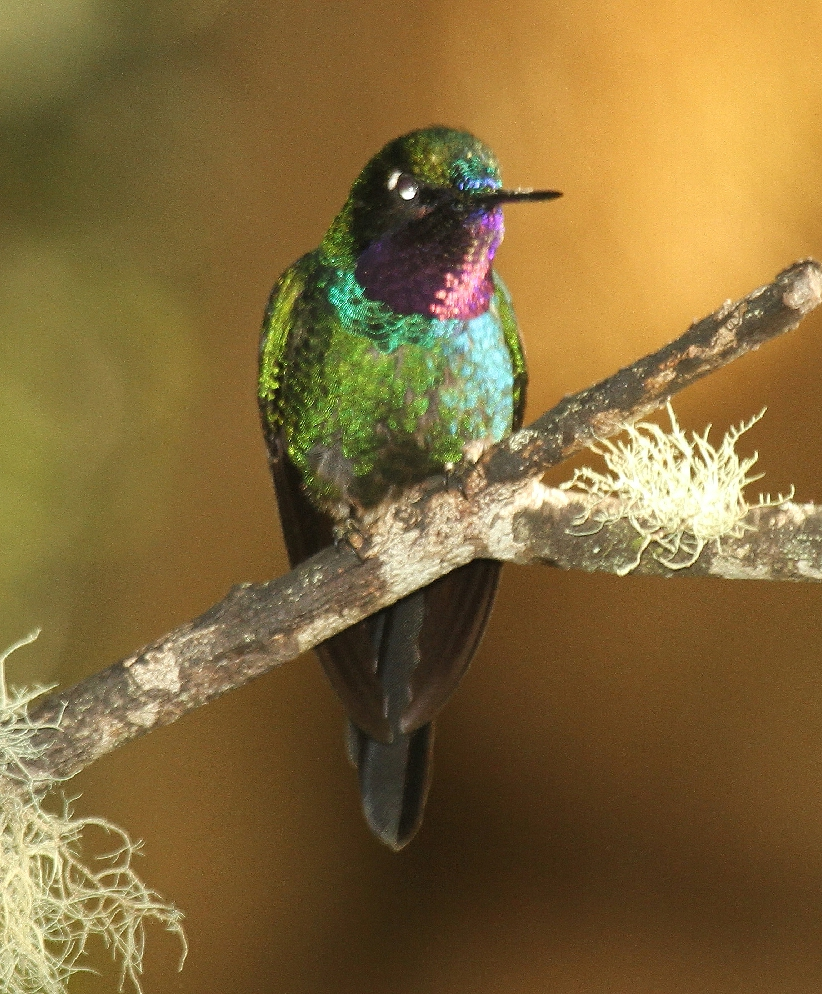

Conservation status
- Least Concern (IUCN 3.1)
- CITES Appendix II

Scientific classification
- Kingdom: Animalia
- Phylum: Chordata
- Class: Aves
- Order: Apodiformes
- Family: Trochilidae
- Genus: Heliangelus
- Species: H. viola

Binomial name
- Heliangelus viola (Gould, 1853)

= Purple-throated sunangel =

Species of hummingbird

The purple-throated sunangel (Heliangelus viola) is a species of hummingbird in the "coquettes", tribe Lesbiini of subfamily Lesbiinae. It is found in Ecuador and Peru.

== Taxonomy and systematics ==
The International Ornithological Committee (IOC), BirdLife International's Handbook of the Birds of the World (HBW), and the South American Classification Committee of the American Ornithological Society (AOS) treat the purple-throated sunangel as monotypic. However, the Clements taxonomy splits it into three subspecies, H. v. viola, H. v. pyropus and H. v. splendidus.

== Description ==
The purple-throated sunangel is 11 to 12 cm (4.3 to 4.7 in) long and weighs 5.1 to 6.6 g (0.18 to 0.23 oz). It has a short, straight, blackish bill. Both sexes have shining green upperparts and green bellies. Their central tail feathers are shining green and the others blackish. Adult males have a glittering blue-green frontlet just above the bill and a deep violet iridescent gorget with a blue-green pectoral bar below it. Adult females lack the blue-green frontlet and iridescent gorget. Their throat is tawny to off-white with bronzy green speckles. Juveniles are similar to the adult female. The differences among the "Clements" subspecies are treated by the other taxonomic systems as being within the range of variation of the nominate.

== Distribution and habitat ==
The purple-throated sunangel is found on the west slope of the Andes from north-central Ecuador south into Peru as far as the departments of Cajamarca and Amazonas. When treated as separate subspecies, H. v. viola is found east of the Marañón River in northern Peru, H. v. pyropus in southern Ecuador and northwestern Peru, and H. v. splendidus in northern Peru west of the Marañón. The species inhabits a variety of landscapes including the interior and edges of cloudforest and secondary forest, alder (Alnus) woodlands, and shrubby areas. In elevation it ranges between 2,150 and 3,000 m (7,100 and 9,800 ft).

== Behavior ==
=== Movement ===
The purple-throated sunangel is sedentary.

=== Feeding ===
The purple-throated sunangel feeds on nectar and insects. In parts of Ecuador it appears to be dependent on the introduced Eucalyptus globulus; at the least its distribution is correlated with that tree's altitudinal occurrence. It captures insects by hawking from a perch and by gleaning from vegetation.

=== Breeding ===
The purple-throated sunangel's breeding season spans from October to January. The clutch of two white eggs is incubated by the female. Nothing else is known about the species' breeding phenology.

=== Vocalization ===
The purple-throated sunangel's calls include "a loose series of short dry trills 'trr..tr..trr....trr..', and a repeated, drawn-out, dry, buzzy 'bzzzrrr'."

== Status ==
The IUCN has assessed the purple-throated sunangel as being of Least Concern. Though its population size is not known it is believed to be stable. Though it has a relatively restricted range it is locally fairly common. It occurs in several protected areas.

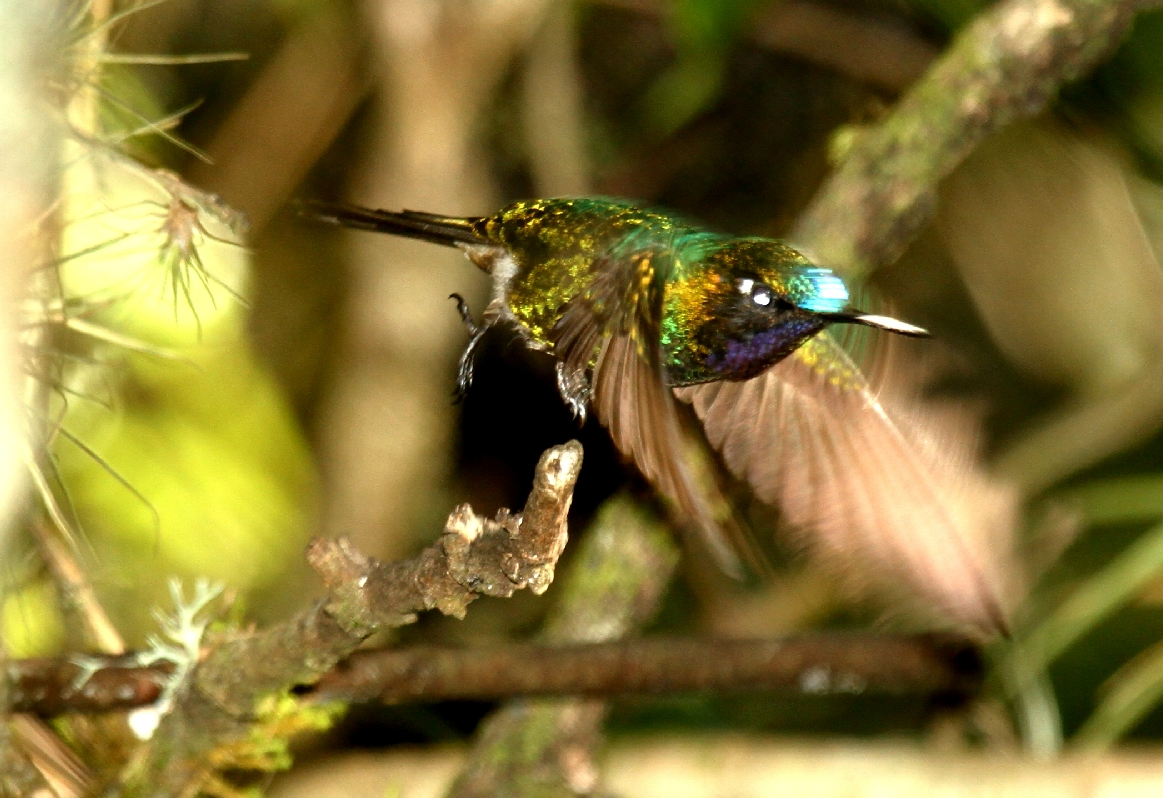
Utuana Reserve - Ecuador

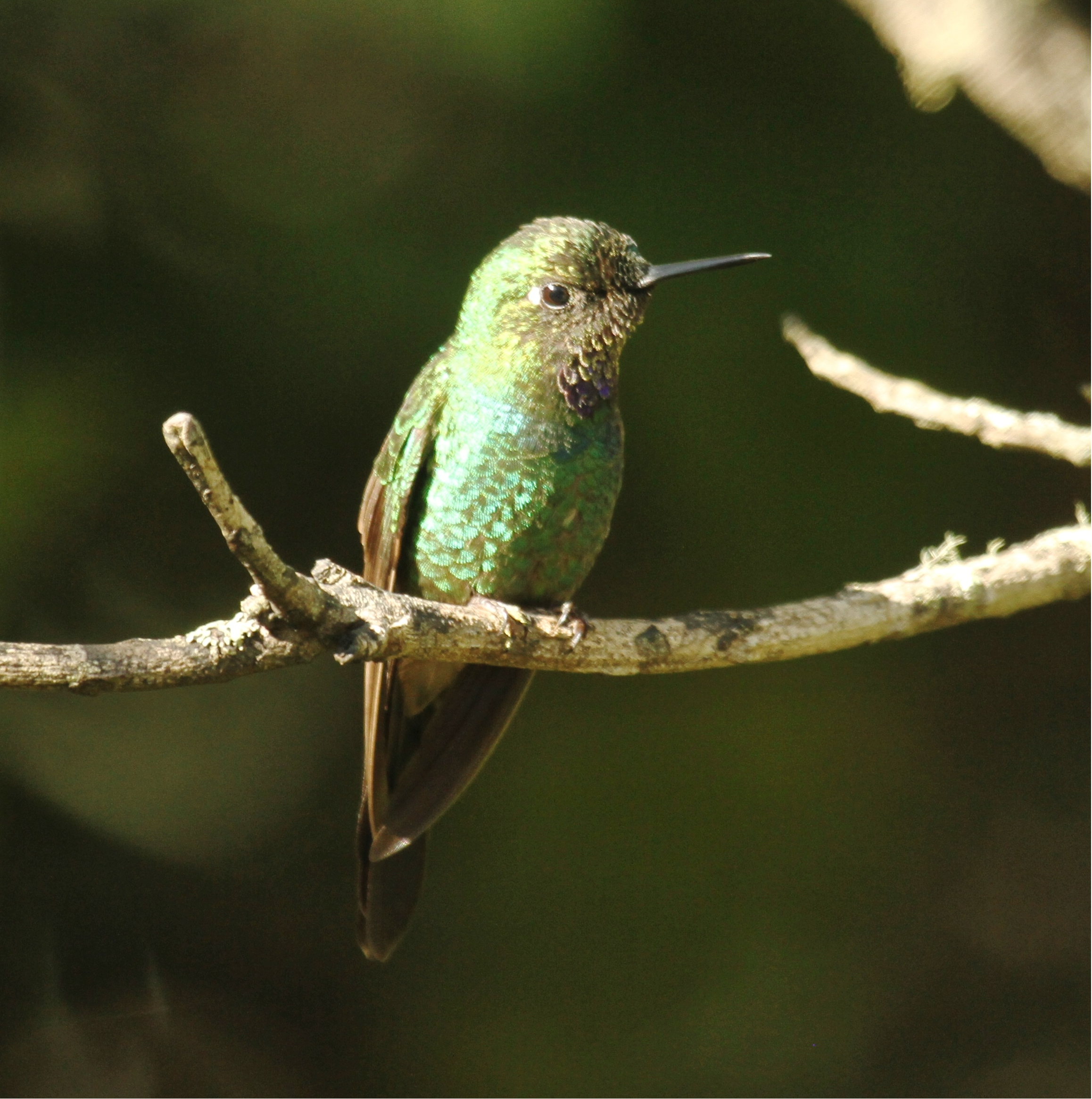
female / Utuana Reserve - Ecuador

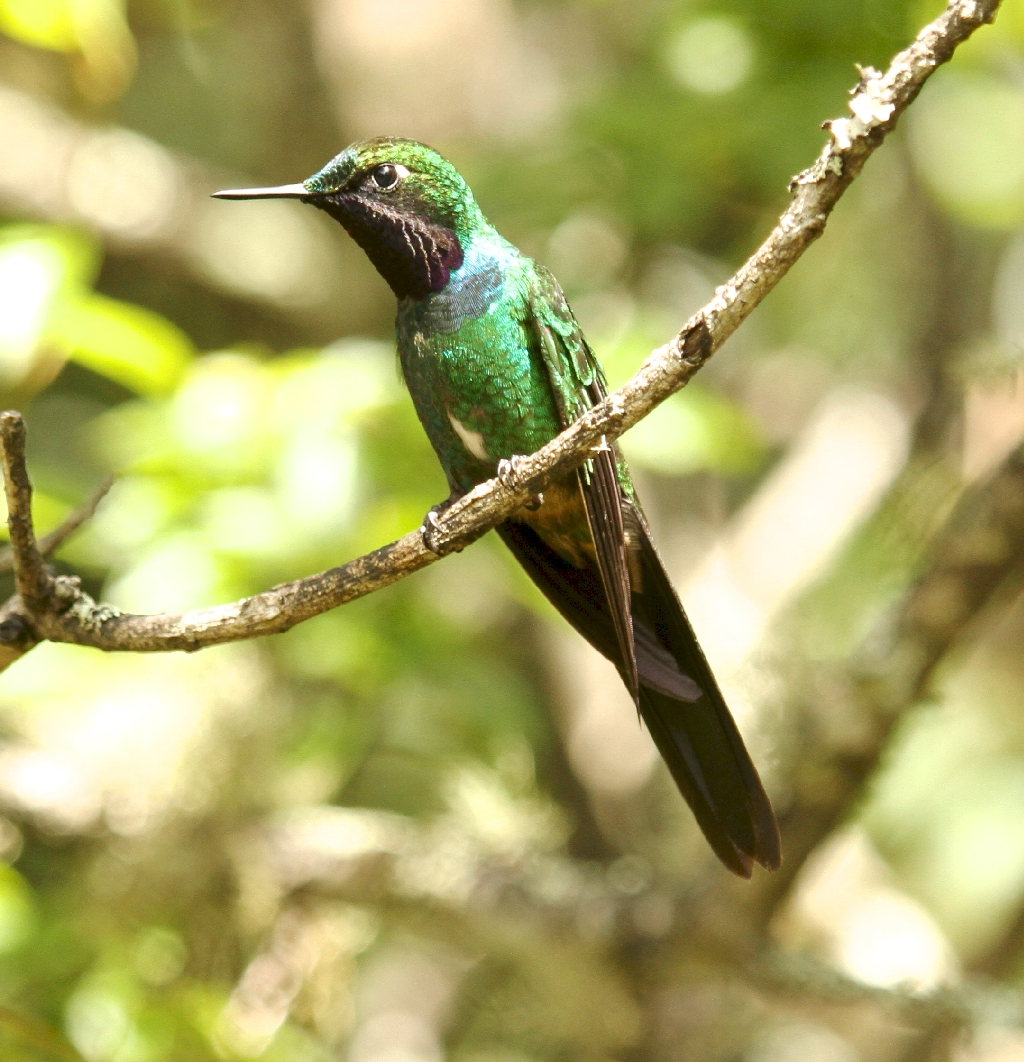
Utuana Reserve - Ecuador
