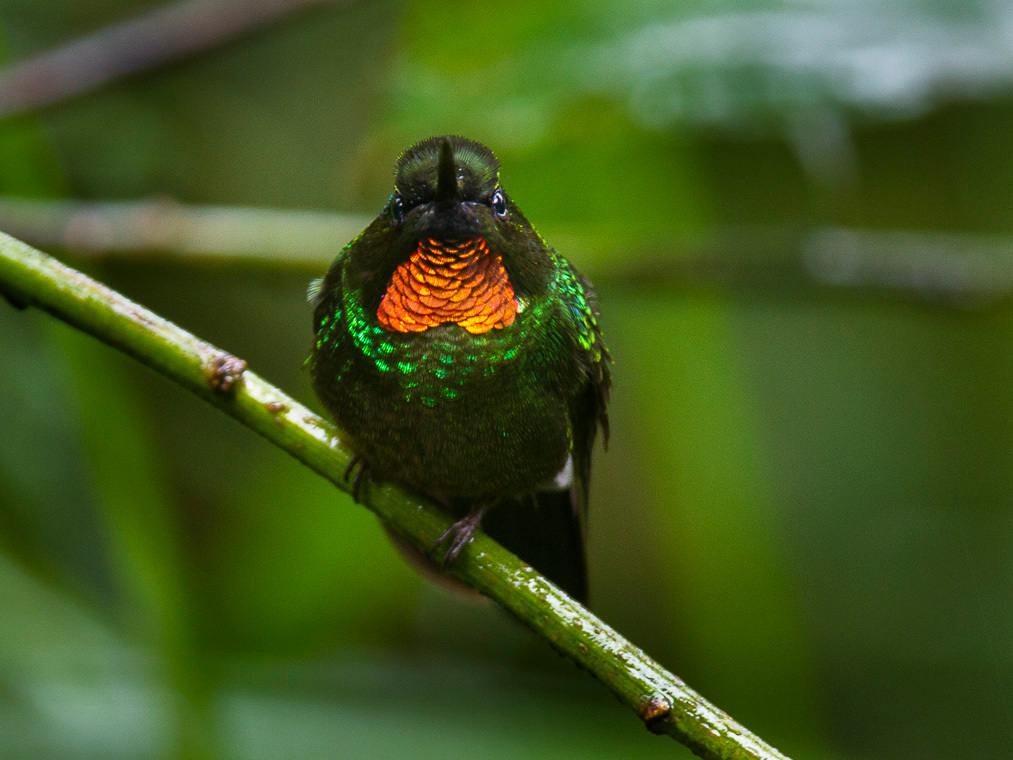

Conservation status
- Least Concern (IUCN 3.1)
- CITES Appendix II

Scientific classification
- Kingdom: Animalia
- Phylum: Chordata
- Class: Aves
- Order: Apodiformes
- Family: Trochilidae
- Genus: Heliangelus
- Species: H. micraster

Binomial name
- Heliangelus micraster Gould, 1872

= Flame-throated sunangel =

Species of hummingbird

The flame-throated sunangel or little sunangel (Heliangelus micraster) is a species of hummingbird in the "coquettes", tribe Lesbiini of subfamily Lesbiinae. It is found in Ecuador and Peru.

== Taxonomy and systematics ==
The flame-throated sunangel has been considered conspecific with the gorgeted sunangel (H. exortis). It has two subspecies, the nominate H. m. micraster and H. m. cutervensis.

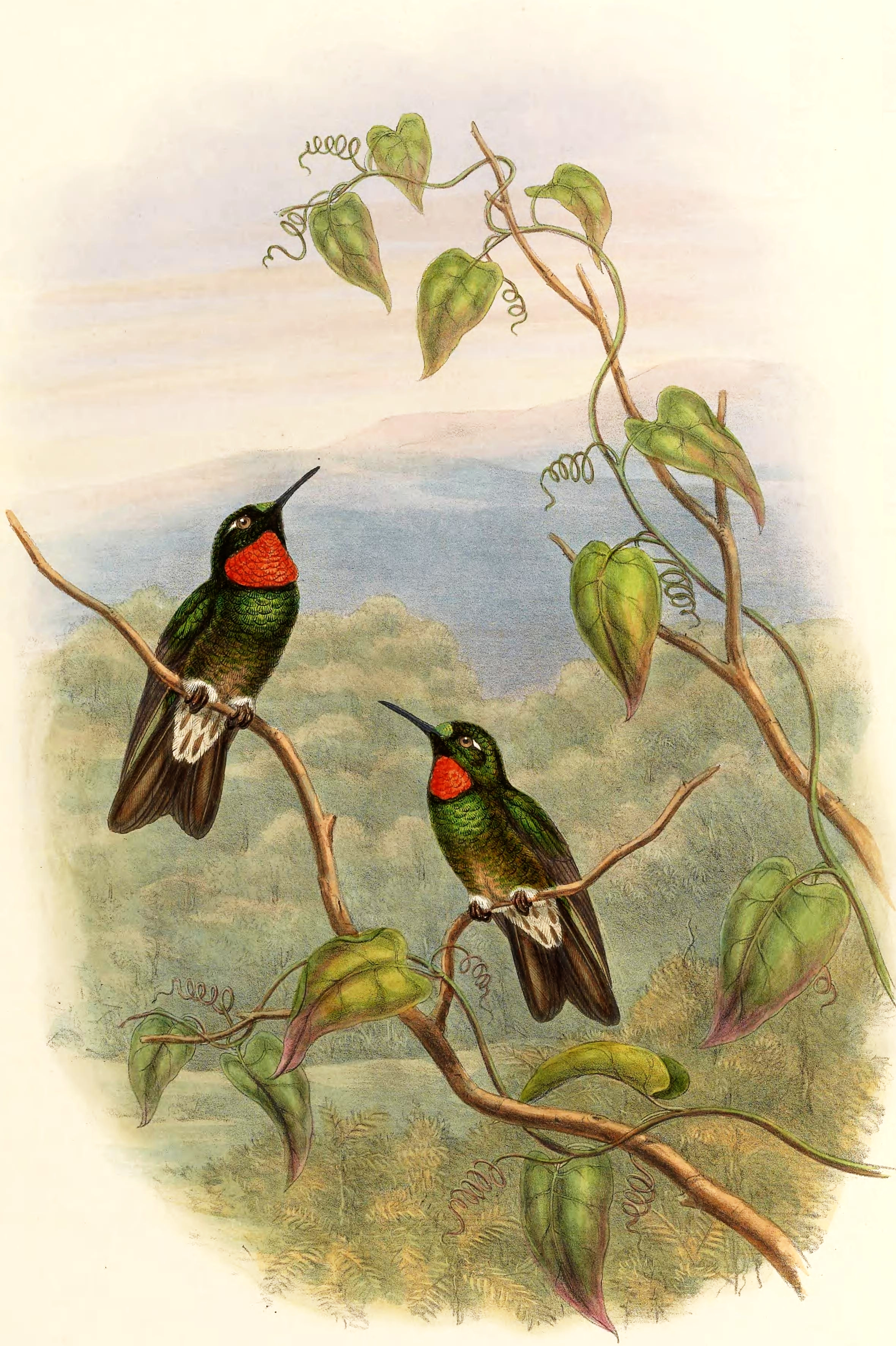
Painting by John Gould.

== Description ==
The flame-throated sunangel is 10 to 11 cm (3.9 to 4.3 in) long and weighs 3.6 to 4.1 g (0.13 to 0.14 oz). Its straight bill is blackish. Both sexes have dark metallic green upperparts. Their lower breasts are dark metallic green, their bellies grayish, and their vent areas almost white. Their tails are dark steel blue. Adult males of the nominate subspecies have a glittering blue-green frontlet just above the bill, a dark purplish blue chin, and an iridescent yellow-orange gorget with a glittering emerald green border. Adult females lack the blue-green frontlet, their chin is blackish, and their throat is white with green to dusky gray speckles and sometimes a few iridescent reddish orange discs. Juveniles are like the adult female but the male does not have the blackish chin. Males of subspecies H. m. cutervensis have a reddish orange gorget.

== Distribution and habitat ==
The nominate subspecies of flame-throated sunangel is found on the eastern slope of the Andes from Ecuador's Morona-Santiago Province into northern Peru. H. m. cutervensis is found in Peru's Department of Cajamarca. The species inhabits the interior and borders of dense mossy forest. In elevation it mostly ranges between 2,300 and 3,400 m (7,500 and 11,200 ft) but has been recorded as low as 1,500 m (4,900 ft).

== Behavior ==
=== Movement ===
The flame-throated sunangel is mostly sedentary but disperses altitudinally after the nesting season.

=== Feeding ===
The flame-throated sunangel defends foraging areas. It mostly feeds on nectar, usually at flowers at low to medium heights above the ground, within the forest and on its borders. Females often venture further into bushy pastures. It usually clings to flowers to feed rather than hovering at them. It also captures insects by hawking from a perch and by gleaning from vegetation.

=== Breeding ===
The flame-throated sunangel's breeding season spans from January to May in Ecuador but has not been defined in Peru. The clutch of two white eggs is incubated by the female. Nothing else is known about the species' breeding phenology.

=== Vocalization ===
The flame-throated sunangel's call is "a repeated dry 'djit' or more gravelly 'drrt'."

== Status ==
The IUCN has assessed the flame-throated sunangel as being of Least Concern, although its population size and trend are not known. The species is locally common but generally uncommon.
