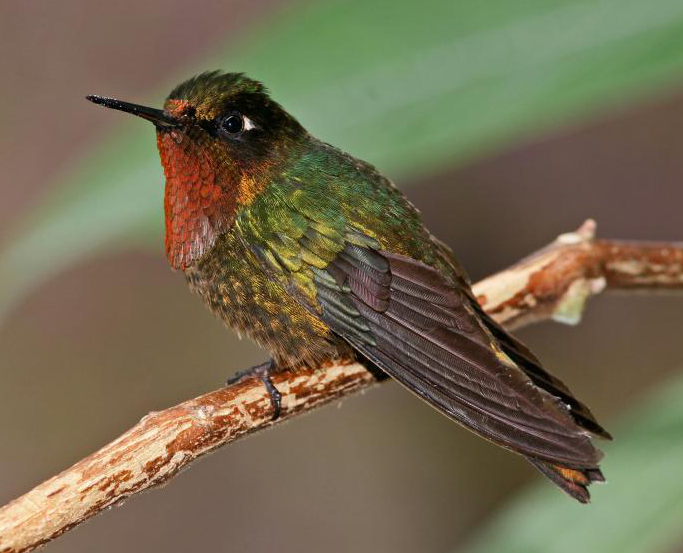

Conservation status
- Least Concern (IUCN 3.1)
- CITES Appendix II

Scientific classification
- Kingdom: Animalia
- Phylum: Chordata
- Class: Aves
- Order: Apodiformes
- Family: Trochilidae
- Genus: Heliangelus
- Species: H. mavors

Binomial name
- Heliangelus mavors Gould, 1848

= Orange-throated sunangel =

Species of hummingbird

The orange-throated sunangel (Heliangelus mavors) is a species of hummingbird in the "coquettes", tribe Lesbiini of subfamily Lesbiinae. It is found in Colombia and Venezuela.

== Taxonomy and systematics ==
The orange-throated sunangel is monotypic.

== Description ==
The orange-throated sunangel is 10 to 11 cm (3.9 to 4.3 in) long and weighs 3.9 to 4.4 g (0.14 to 0.16 oz). It has a straight blackish bill. Adult males have a shining green crown and back. A small area above the bill and the throat and upper breast are glittering coppery orange. A broad cinnamon-buff band separates the upper breast from the buff lower breast that is spotted golden green. The central tail feathers are golden green and the outer ones dark bronze with pale tips. Adult females are similar but their throat and upper breast are reddish brown with buff speckles. Immatures are similar to the adult female but young males have a dusky brown throat.

== Distribution and habitat ==
The orange-throated sunangel is found from Venezuela's Lara state southwest into Colombia as far as Boyacá Department. It inhabits open landscapes such as the edges of humid cloudforest and elfin forest, pastures, and páramo. It is also found in dryer habitats. In elevation it ranges from 2,000 to 3,200 m (6,600 to 10,500 ft).

== Behavior ==
=== Movement ===
The orange-throated sunangel is mainly sedentary but it descends to the lower part of its elevational range after breeding.

=== Feeding ===
The orange-throated sunangel defends flower clusters from which it takes nectar, often clinging to the flower while feeding. It usually forages at low level and near cover. It also catches insects by hawking from a perch.

=== Breeding ===
The orange-throated sunangel's breeding season spans from December to March. Its nest has not been described. The clutch of two eggs is incubated by the female, who first breeds in her second year. The incubation period and time to fledging are not known.

=== Vocalization ===
The orange-throated sunangel's call is "a repeated, high-pitched, cricket-like, faint trill" that is given both in flight and from a perch.

== Status ==
The IUCN has assessed the orange-throated sunangel as being of Least Concern. Though its population size is not known, it is believed to be stable. It is locally common in Venezuela but uncommon to rare in Colombia.
