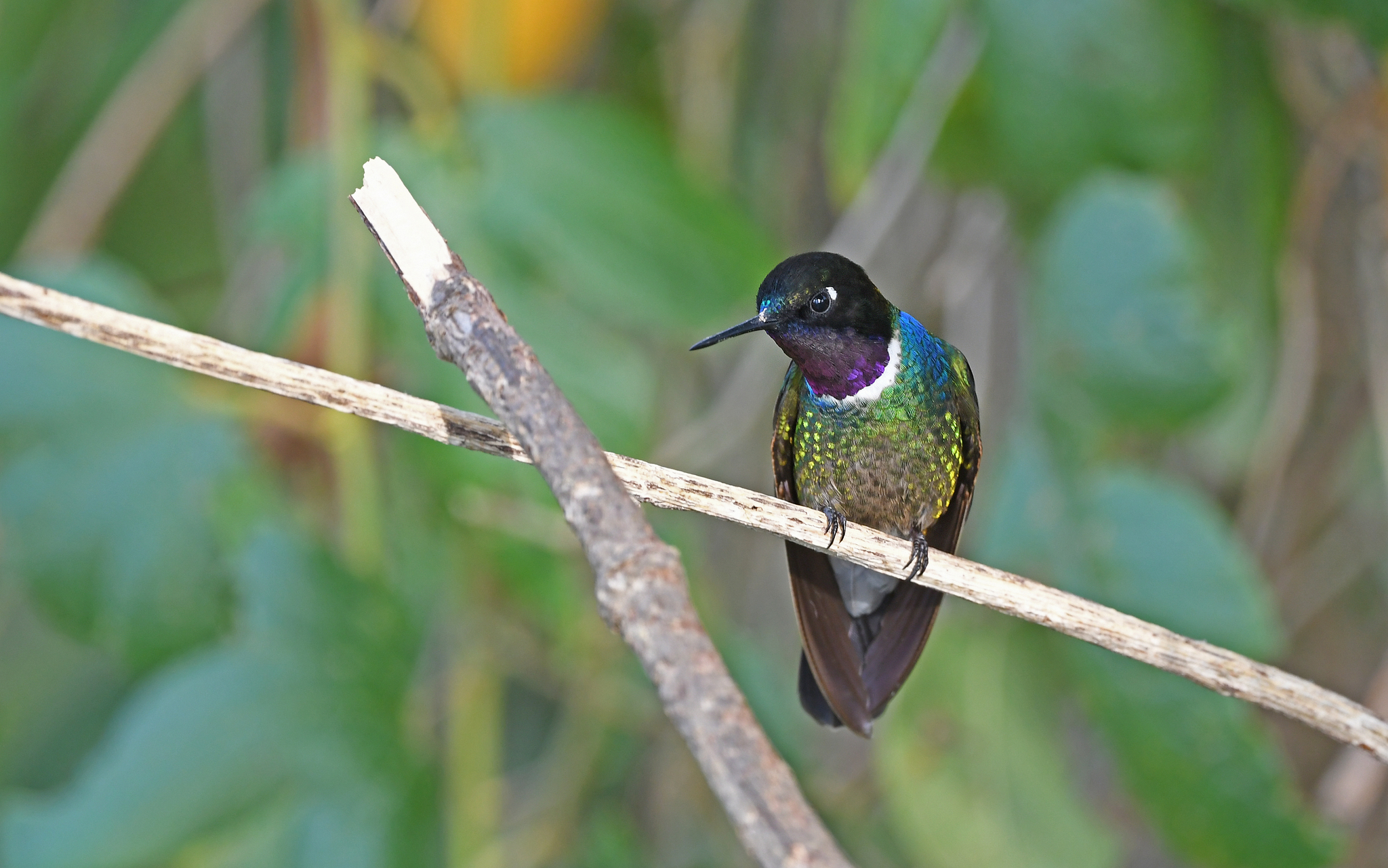

Conservation status
- Least Concern (IUCN 3.1)
- CITES Appendix II

Scientific classification
- Kingdom: Animalia
- Phylum: Chordata
- Class: Aves
- Clade: Strisores
- Order: Apodiformes
- Family: Trochilidae
- Genus: Heliangelus
- Species: H. clarisse

Binomial name
- Heliangelus clarisse (Longuemare, 1841)

Synonyms
- Heliangelus amethysticollis clarisse

= Longuemare's sunangel =

Species of hummingbird

Longuemare's sunangel (Heliangelus clarisse) is a species of hummingbird in the "coquettes", tribe Lesbiini of subfamily Lesbiinae. It is found in Colombia and Venezuela.

== Taxonomy and systematics ==
Longuemare's sunangel was formally described in 1841 by the French ornithologist Agathe François Gouÿe de Longuemare under the binomial name Ornismya clarrisse. He chose the specific epithet to honour Clarisse Parzudaki née Moreuil (1807-1884) wife of French naturalist Charles Parzudaki. Longuemare's sunangel is now one of nine species placed in the genus Heliangelus that was introduced in 1848 by the English ornithologist John Gould. It has sometimes been considered as a subspecies of the amethyst-throated sunangel (Heliangelus amethysticollis).

Three subspecies are recognised:

- H. c. violiceps Phelps, WH Sr & Phelps, WH Jr, 1953 – Sierra de Perijá (Colombia/Venezuela border)
- H. c. verdiscutus Phelps, WH Sr & Phelps, WH Jr, 1955 – Tamá region of northeastern Colombia and northwestern Venezuela
- H. c. clarisse (de Longuemare, G, 1841) – eastern Colombia and western Venezuela

== Description ==
Longuemare's sunangel is 9 to 10 cm (3.5 to 3.9 in) long and weighs 5.0 to 6.0 g (0.18 to 0.21 oz). It has a short (less than 2 cm (0.79 in)), straight, blackish bill. The adult male of the nominate H. c. clarisse has a narrow glittering blue-green frontlet just above the bill, a dusky crown, and dark bronzy green upperparts. Its throat and upper breast gorget is glittering rosy and has a white pectoral band below it. The rest of the underparts are dusky buff with round green spots. The inner tail feathers are dark bronzy green and the outer ones blackish and occasionally have pale tips. The female has dull brown throat feathers with rufous or bronze green inclusions. Its belly has less spotting than the male's. Juveniles are plumaged like the adult female.

The male H. c. violiceps has a strongly blue frontlet and a purple gorget. The female's frontlet is dull; its dull brown throat patch is smaller than that of the nominate and a band of dark green separates it from the white pectoral band. The male H. c. verdiscutus has an emerald green frontlet, a deep bronzy purple crown, and a dark line along the upper edge of the gorget. The female has the same dark line and a smaller gorget than the nominate's with a dark green border.

The call is "a repeated dry, upward-inflected 'tsik' or 'tsit'."

== Distribution and habitat ==
The nominate Longuemare's sunangel H. c. clarisse is found in Colombia's Eastern Andes and adjacent western Venezuela. H. c. violiceps is found further north, in Serranía del Perijá that defines the Colombia-Venezuela border. H. c. verdiscutus is restricted to the Tamá Massif, an extension of Colombia's eastern Andes on the border with Venezuela.

Longuemare's sunangel primarily inhabits the edges of humid cloudforest and elfin forest. It can also be found in more open landscapes including fields with scattered bushes and trees, open woodland, overgrown ravines, and páramo. In elevation it ranges from 1,800 to 3,600 m (5,900 to 11,800 ft). It is sedentary.

== Behavior ==
=== Feeding ===
Longuemare's sunangel feeds on nectar and also includes insects in its diet. It defends feeding territories that are dense with nectar sources. It typically feeds at heights up to 6 m (20 ft), often along streams. It captures insects by hawking from a perch.

=== Breeding ===
The breeding season of Longuemare's sunangel extends at least from May to August. Its nest of moss and fine plant material is usually hung below a leaf or other structure that provides shelter from the weather. The clutch of two eggs is incubated by the female. The incubation period and time to fledging are not known.

== Status ==
The IUCN has assessed Longuemare's sunangel as being of Least Concern. Its population size is not known but is believed to be stable. It is considered fairly common to common and no potential threats are known.
