= Émile Parzudaki =

French businessman an ornithologist

- Born: François Charles Emil Fauqueux; May 28, 1829; Nointel, France
- Died: March 21, 1899 (aged 69); 12th arrondissement of Paris
- Occupation(s): Businessman, natural history dealer, scientist
- Known for: Publisher of a bird catalogue that he had compiled according to the systematics of Charles Lucien Jules Laurent Bonaparte
- Spouse: Louise Emma Bonifay (m. 1855; death 1894)
- Children: 2

François Charles Émile Fauqueux-Parzudaki (28 May 1829 in Nointel Département Oise- 21 March 1899 in 12th arrondissement of Paris) was a French businessman, natural History dealer, and ornithologist who published a number of scientific catalogues on birds.

== Early years ==
Émile Parzudaki was born François Charles Emil Fauqueux. He was the son of Clarisse Moreuil and the furniture merchant François Napoléon Fauqueux (1806–1833). They married on 7 February 1828 in Nointel. After the death of his father, his mother married the natural history dealer Charles Parzudaki on August 19, 1837. In 1858, Émile added his name by decree, to the surname of his stepfather. In the course of the renaming, Emil also became Émile.

Among the scientists of his time, he was known only as Émile Parzudaki even before his official renaming. He called himself Émile Parzudaki in his first publication in 1856.

== Career ==
This was a catalogue with a list of bird specimens that he had compiled according to the systematics of Charles Lucien Jules Laurent Bonaparte. The value of the catalogue for science is also shown by the fact that Edmond de Sélys Longchamps wrote a review of it in 1857 and Bonaparte also published further notes.

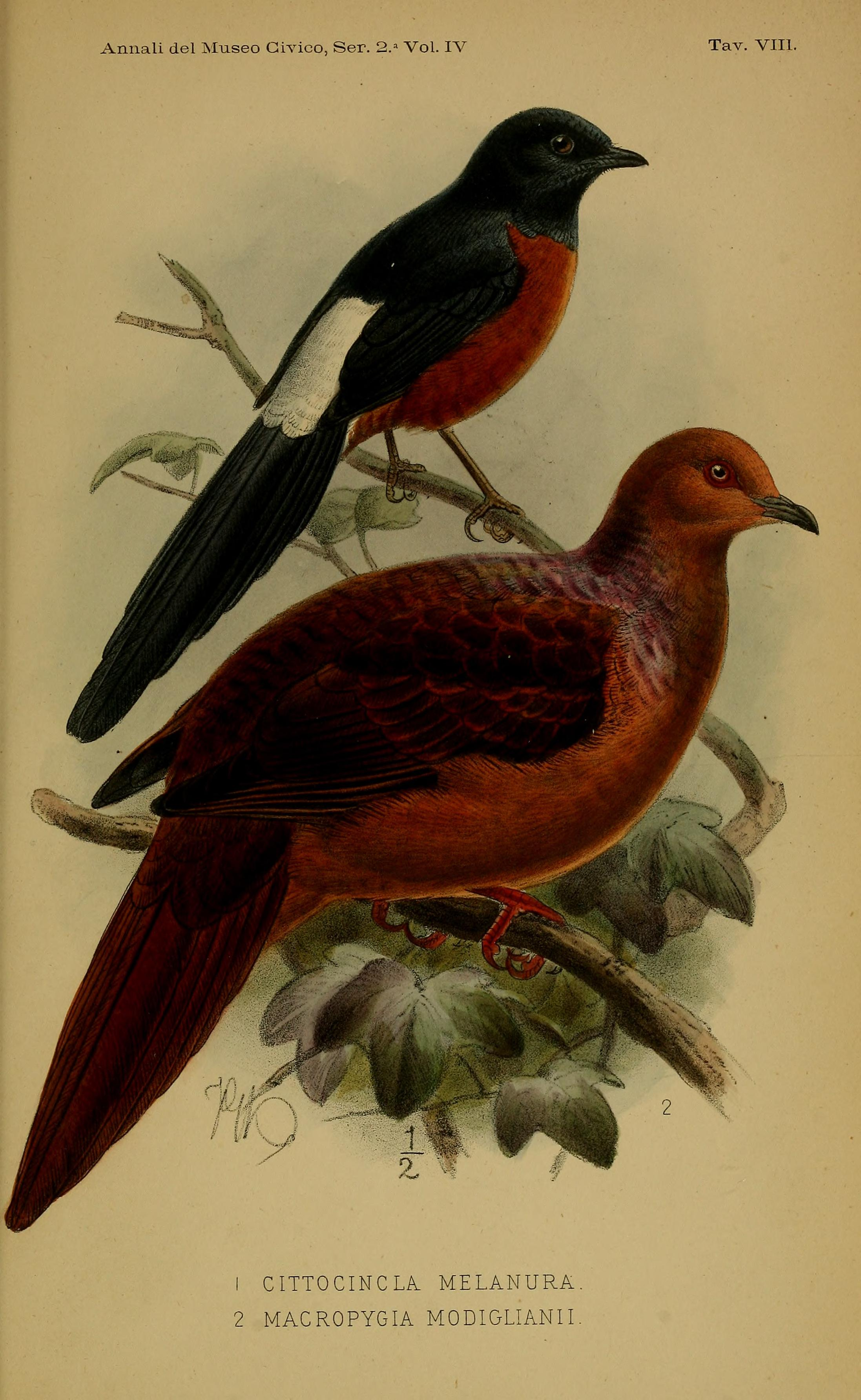
Macropygia emiliana named for Emile

Émile published further catalogues. In 1861, a catalogue of hummingbirds was published, and in 1862, together with Auguste Sallé, a catalogue of birds from Mexico. In 1862, Paolo Lanfossi reported on another catalogue of birds from Algeria (Catlogo degli uccelli d'Algeria del Parzudaki). Despite the publications, they did not only sell bird skins in their natural history trade. Exhibits of bird eggs, shells, insects, scorpions, amphibians and mammals can still be found in numerous natural history museums around the world. In the archives of the Reale Museo di fisica e storia naturale di Firenze, for example, there is a handwritten list of exotic reptiles entitled Elenco di rettili esotici ricevuti in baratto dal naturalista Emilio Parzudaki di Parigi (29 November 1862).

His importance as a natural history dealer is also shown by the fact that he had many skins in his possessions, which were new to science or already extinct. He also sold parts of François Victor Masséna's parrot collection to the Natural History Museum in London in 1859 and 1860. Around 1867, Émile must have given up the natural history trade.

The natural history shop was probably sold to Jérôme Louis Peter (c. 1819–1888) and his son Auguste Peter (1849–1899). In August 1874, he and Marie Joseph Emile Rogelin took over the management of their uncle Philippe Latour's shoe factory after his death. The production of the shoes was located in Liancourt and was managed by Parzudaki.

Charles and Émile's natural history shop was located at 2 rue Bouloi and 37 rue de La Fontaine-St-Georges. At the end of his life, Emile lived at 54 rue Ledru-Rollin in the 12th arrondissement of Paris

== Personal life ==
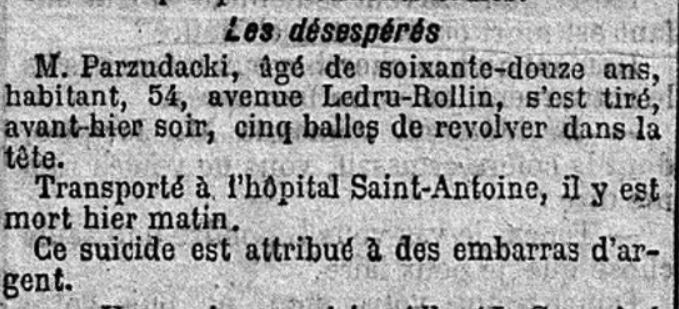
Announcement of death of Émile Parzudaki in Le Petit journal Parti social français from 22. March 1899

On 15 December 1855, Émile married Louise Emma Bonifay (1832–1894) in Paris. The marriage produced two daughters: Louise Clarisse Emma, born on 9 September 1858, and Jeanne Marie Emilie, born on 18 May 1860.

In 1899, Parzudaki shot himself with five bullets in the head with a revolver in Avenue Ledru-Rollin and died on the way to the hospital.

== Publications ==
Publications include:

- Catalogue des oiseaux d’Europe offerts en 1856 aux ornithologistes suivi d'une ènumeration supplémentaire des espèces algériennes nun européennes d'une liste des espèces acclimatées et d'une autre de celles a tort comme d'Europe rédigé d'après dernières classification de S. A. Monseigneur le Prince Bonaparte. Chez M. Èmile Parzudaki, Paris 1856 (gallica.bnf.fr).
- Catalogue de la collection des trochilidés. Chez M. Èmile Parzudaki, Paris 1861 (archive.org)." Emile Parzudaki's Catalogue des Trochilides is another printed list of the same character, which those ornithologists who are studying the group of Humming-birds would do well to apply for. M. Parzudaki has a very large series of skins of this group of birds on sale. The Ibis 1861"
- with Auguste Sallé: Catalogue des oiseaux du Mexique, composant les collections de M. A. Sallé et de M. E. Parzudaki. Mme. Ve. Bouchard-Huzard, Paris 1862.
