= Agathe François Gouÿe de Longuemare =

Agathe François Gouÿe de Longuemare (February 6, 1792 in Versailles – February 12, 1866), was a French ornithologist and agent at the Overseas Hospitals and Prisons Directorate of the Ministry of the Navy and Colonies.

== Biography ==
He is son of Denis Charles François Gouÿe de Longuemare and Félicité Victoire Sayollé.

On May 2, 1811, he was hired as a student in the administration of the French Navy. From July 7, 1812 to April 12, 1813, he served aboard gunboat No. 192 of the Napoleonic army. Initially registered as out of service, he returned to duty on March 18, 1816. From March 1817 to November 1818 he worked aboard Le Rhône and in February 1819 in the naval administration. Until July 1848, he continued his administrative career in Rochefort and Paris, where he worked as an administrative assistant in the overseas hospitals and prisons department (Deputy Head of Hospitals) at the Ministry of the Navy and Colonies.

He married Victoire Françoise Rosalie Joséphine (born Marsy, March 22, 1796 in Gisors and died October 29, 1873 in Paris) on April 20, 1822. They had at least one son, Henri Victor Goüye de Longuemare (1823–1890), who pursued a career similar to that of his father.

It was probably in Rochefort that he met René Primevère Lesson, who described some of the hummingbirds of his collection. He received a specimen from Charles Parzudaki that he named Longuemare's sunangel (Heliangelus clarisse) in the Revue Zoologique par la Société Cuvierienne. A year later, a more detailed description of it appeared in Magasin de zoologie with a plate of the hummingbird illustrated by his wife, engraved by Christophe Annedouche.

In 1840, he was introduced by Sauveur Abel Aubert Petit de la Saussaye (1792–1870) as member number 184 of the Cuvierian Society. On April 25, 1844, he received the title of Knight of the Legion of Honor.

The epithets of the Little Hermit (Phaethornnis longuemareus (Lesson, RP, 1832)) and the Purple Sunbird (Anthreptes Longuemarei (Lesson, 1831)) · are named in his honor. The Purple-collared woodstar (Myrtis Fanny (Lesson, 1838)) is named after his wife.

== Publications ==
- Oiseaux-mouche nouveau / Revue Zoologique par La Société Cuvierienne. Vol. 4. 1841. p. 306..
- G. Oiseaux-Mouche. Ornismia. Curvier. O.M: Clarisse. O. Clarisse. De Longuemare / Magasin de zoologie, d'anatomie comparée et de palaeontologie. Vol. 4. 1842. pp. 1–2..
