= Bogotá sunangel =

Scientific classification
- Domain: Eukaryota
- Kingdom: Animalia
- Phylum: Chordata
- Class: Aves
- Clade: Strisores
- Order: Apodiformes
- Family: Trochilidae
- Genus: Heliangelus
- Species: H. zusii

Binomial name
- Heliangelus zusii Graves, 1993

Species of bird

The Bogotá sunangel (Heliangelus zusii) is a species of hummingbird that is only known from one specimen. It is a dark bluish-black hummingbird with a straight bill. It is distinguishable from other Heliangelus species by its forked, dark purple tail and bright green frontlet and gorget. This bird has only been found in Colombia and is assumed to live in cloud forest between 1200 and 3400 meters. Most of its potential habitat is degraded, though it is feasible that a population may still exist.

This hummingbird is known from a single skin purchased in Bogotá in 1909. Nothing more is known of the bird, and though the skin is most commonly thought to come from either the Eastern or Central Andes of Colombia, other specimens from Bogotá have come from as far away as Ecuador. Since the bird has not been seen alive, it is assumed to have a relict population if it still survives. Some have suggested that the bird is just a hybrid, though the skin is very distinct.

Phylogenetic analyses place H. zusii as sister to a clade of mid -to high- elevation Andean species currently placed in the genera Taphrolesbia and Aglaiocercus (but outside the genus Heliangelus).

After the discovery of a hummingbird hybrid at Rogitama in 2011 which shows similarities to the Bogotá sunangel it has been shown that the Bogotá sunangel might be a hybrid between Aglaiocercus kingii and a yet undetermined species.

In 2017, the IOC lumped this bird with the long-tailed sylph, following the taxonomy of Pérez-Emán et al. 2017 and Kirchman et al. 2010 that it was a hybrid. Other taxonomic authorities, such as the American Ornithological Society, have continued to recognize the species.
