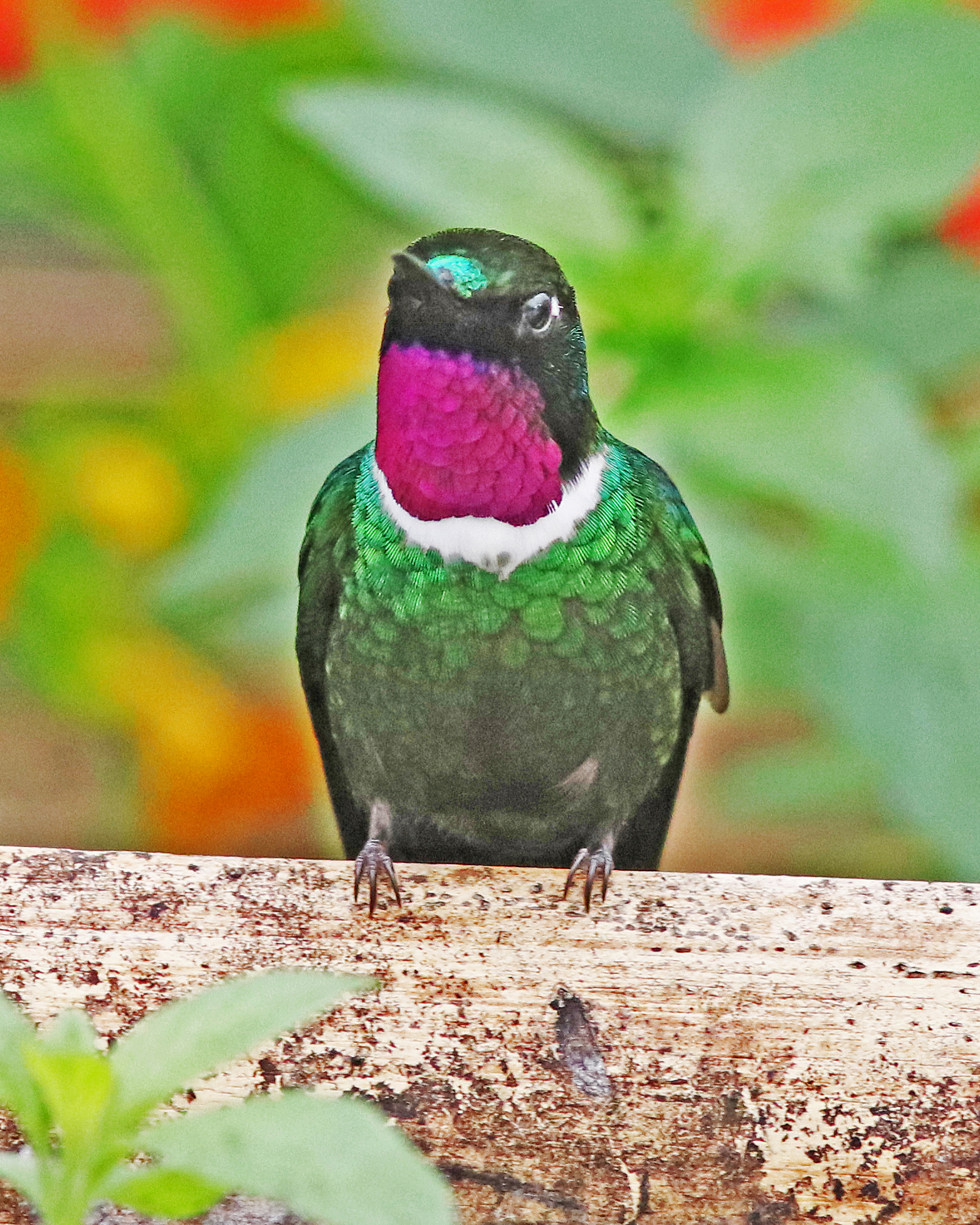
- male in northwestern Ecuador
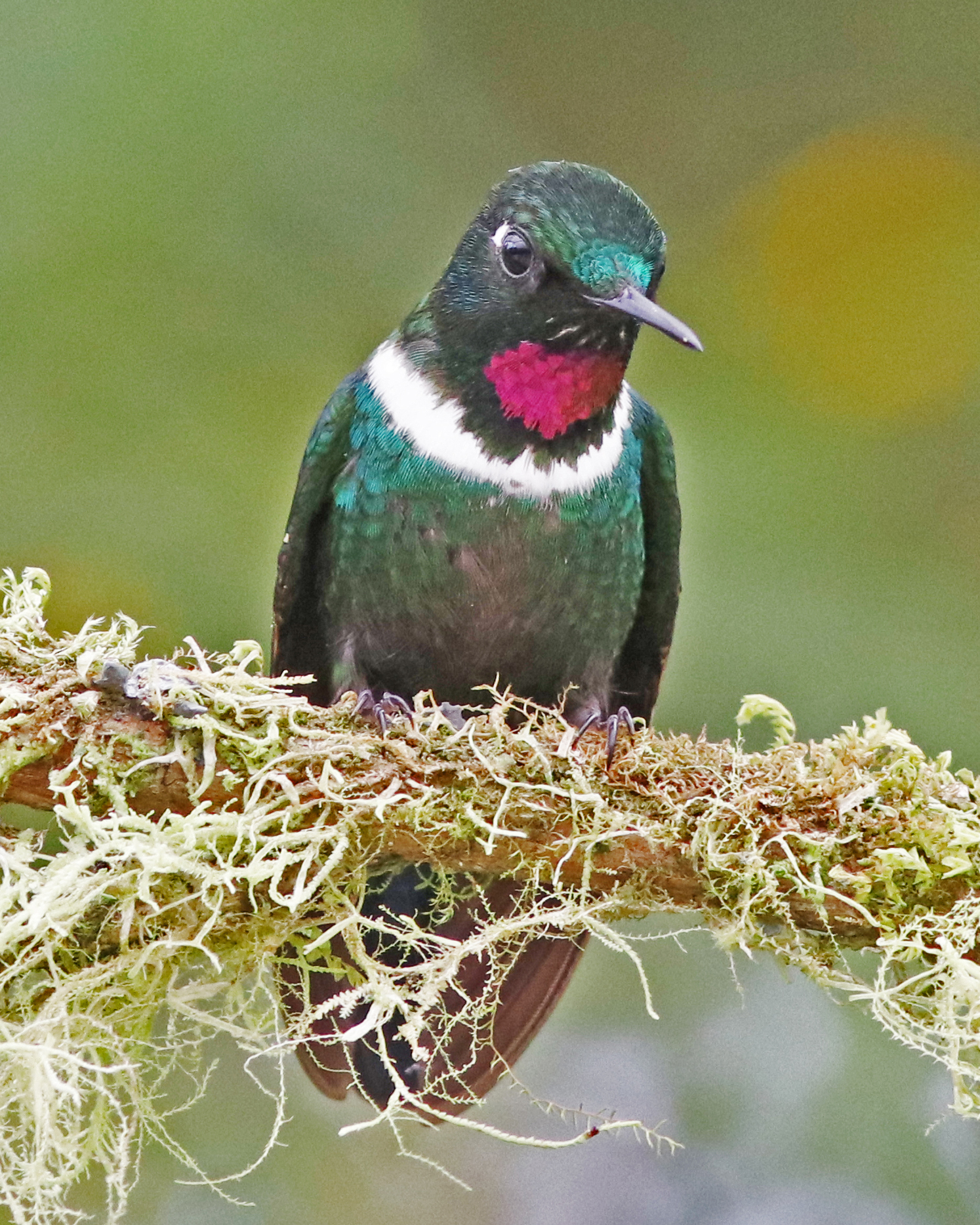
- female in northwestern Ecuador

Conservation status
- Least Concern (IUCN 3.1)
- CITES Appendix II

Scientific classification
- Kingdom: Animalia
- Phylum: Chordata
- Class: Aves
- Order: Apodiformes
- Family: Trochilidae
- Genus: Heliangelus
- Species: H. strophianus

Binomial name
- Heliangelus strophianus (Gould, 1846)

= Gorgeted sunangel =

Species of hummingbird

The gorgeted sunangel (Heliangelus strophianus) is a species of hummingbird in the "coquettes", tribe Lesbiini of subfamily Lesbiinae. It is found in Colombia and Ecuador.

== Taxonomy and systematics ==
The gorgeted sunangel is monotypic.

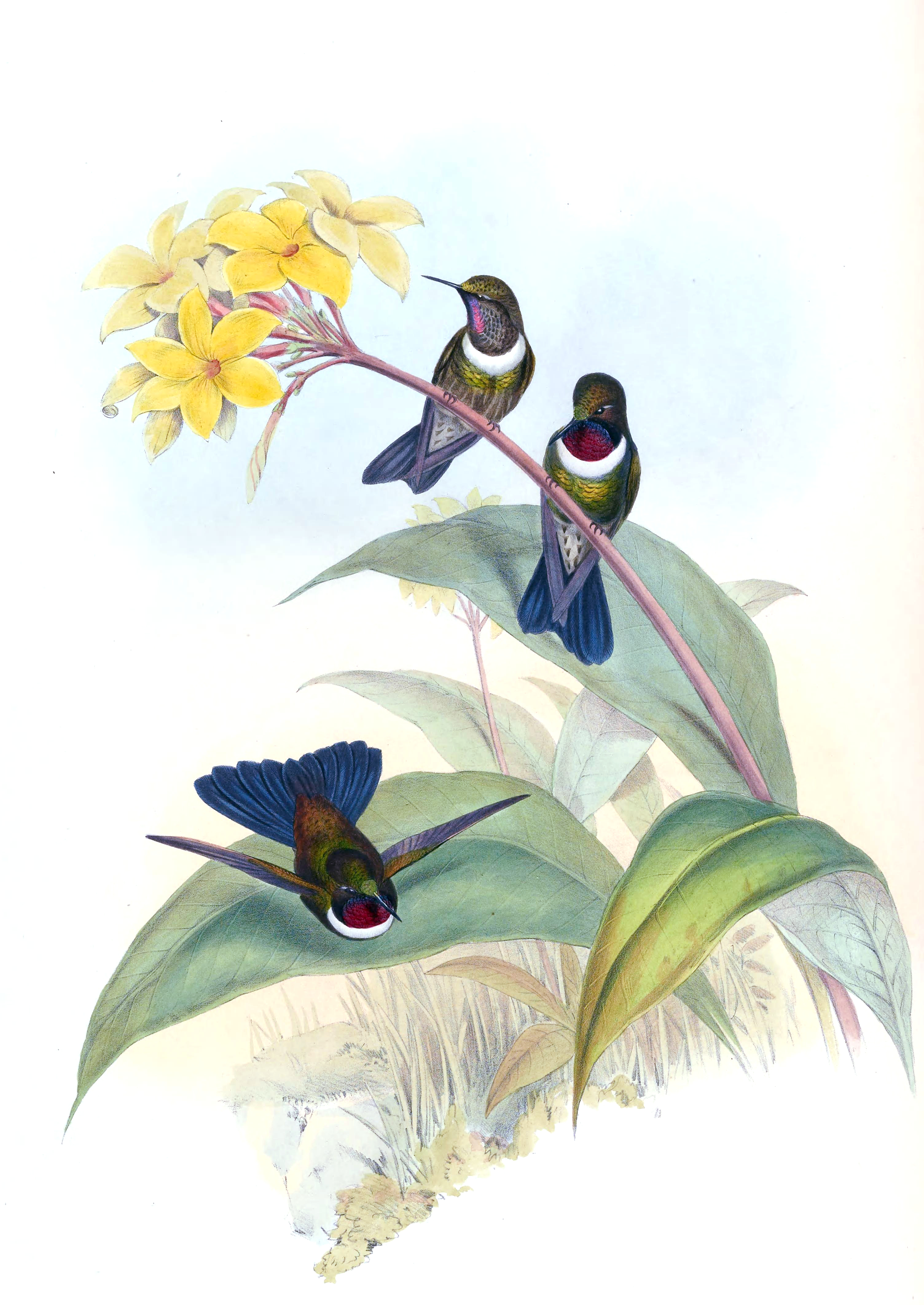
Painting by John Gould

== Description ==
The gorgeted sunangel is 10 to 11 cm (3.9 to 4.3 in) long and weighs about 5.3 g (0.19 oz). Its bill is short, blackish, and straight. The species is sexually dimorphic, but only slightly. Both sexes are dark velvety green above with a small white postocular spot and a dark steel-blue tail. Their lower underparts are dark green with dark gray speckles towards the rear. The male has a small glittering green frontlet just above the bill. Its throat and upper breast gorget is glittering rose to violet and has a white pectoral band below it. The female's chin is dark gray-brown with white fringes on the feathers and occasionally some glittering rosy feathers. Juveniles are like the female but with a narrower white pectoral band.

== Distribution and habitat ==
The gorgeted sunangel is found from far southwestern Colombia's Nariño Department south discontinuously through much of western Ecuador. It primarily inhabits humid to wet premontane forest but is also found at the forest's shrubby borders and thickets. Within the forest it favors damp ravines. In elevation it ranges from 1,200 to 2,800 m (3,900 to 9,200 ft) but is rare at the upper elevations.

== Behavior ==
=== Movement ===
Little is known about the gorgeted sunangel's movements but some seasonal altitudinal movement is likely.

=== Feeding ===
The gorgeted sunangel is usually seen alone, so it is probably territorial. It feeds on nectar, mostly at low flowers but sometimes as high as the subcanopy. It stays in or near cover and shuns open areas. No further information has been documented, though other species of its genus include insects in their diets.

=== Breeding ===
The gorgeted sunangel's breeding season is mainly between October and December but might begin earlier. The clutch of two white eggs is incubated by the female. Nothing else is known about the species' breeding phenology.

=== Vocalization ===
The gorgeted sunangel's song is "a repeated series of 2–3 high-pitched 'pseee' notes...followed by a slightly lower-pitched 'tsip' note." Its call is "a dry chattering followed by a mellow note 'kr..krr..krr..whee..'" and it also makes a high-pitched twitter.

== Status ==
The IUCN has assessed the gorgeted sunangel as being of Least Concern, though its population size is not known and is believed to be decreasing. It is fairly common in much of its range and occurs in a few protected areas.
