= Société Cuvierienne =

French zoological society

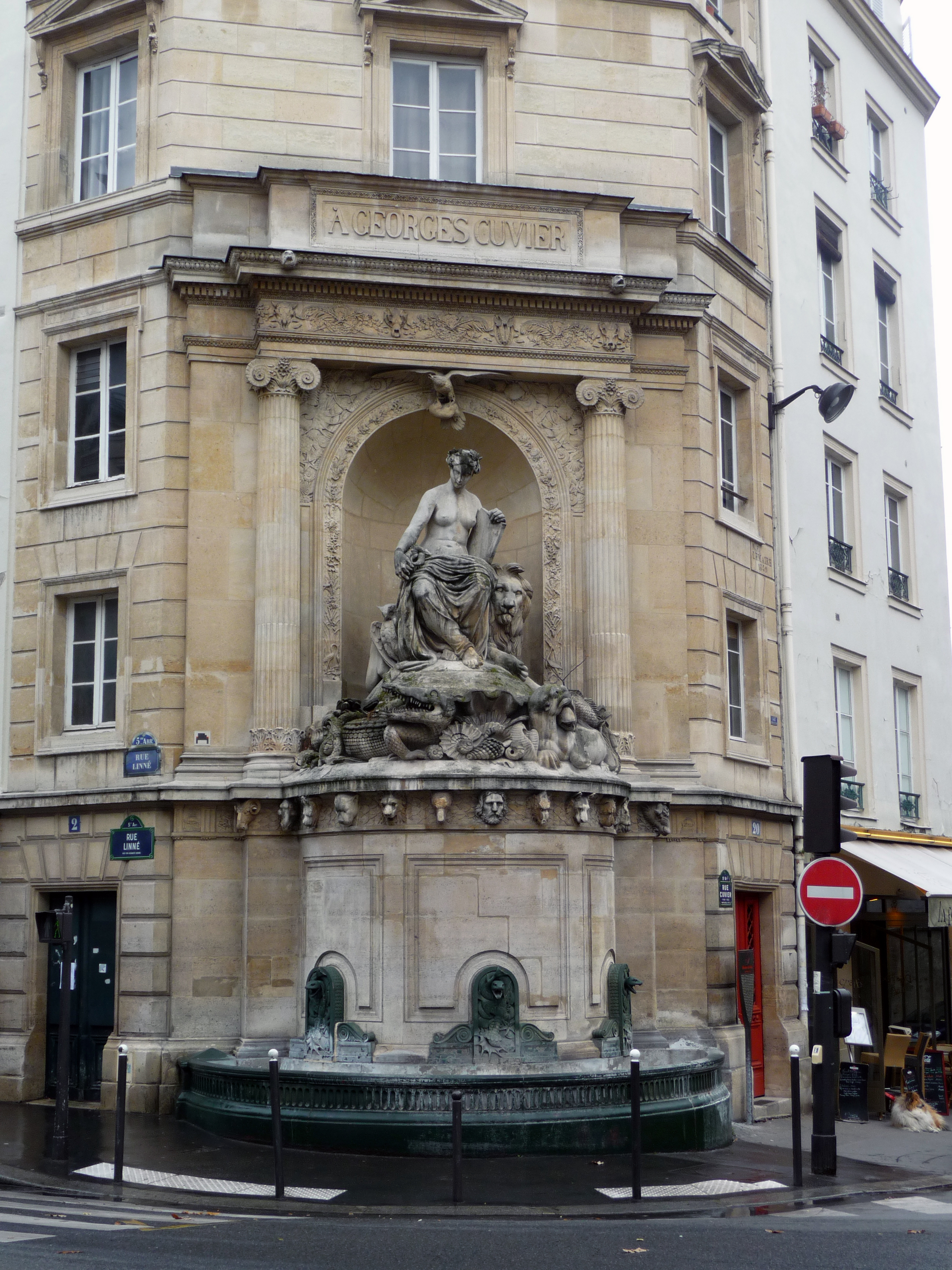
Fountain honouring Georges Cuvier (Paris)

The Société Cuvierienne was a zoological society founded in Paris in 1838, named after the zoologist Georges Cuvier, who had died six years earlier It existed until about 1848 the year of the February Revolution. The society published the monthly journal Revue zoologique par la Société Cuvierienne, the first volume of which appeared in 1838 and the last volume in 1848 (the last issue was from December 1848). The editor was the entomologist and zoological illustrator Félix Édouard Guérin-Méneville, who continued Cuvier's zoological encyclopedia from 1829 as Iconographie du règne animal de G. Cuvier, and also published the annual journal Magasin de zoologie, d'anatomie comparée et de palaeontologie from 1831 (which appeared until 1849). Guérin-Méneville also published the monthly zoological journal Revue et magasin de zoologie pure et appliquée from 1849. However, it had no connection to the Cuvier Society, which had been dissolved shortly before. According to its statutes, the society dealt not only with zoology, but also with comparative anatomy and paleontology. When it was founded, the Société Cuvierienne had 140 members including important French biologists. Members included Alexander von Humboldt and the explorer Maximilian zu Wied-Neuwied, Lorenz Oken, Christian Gottfried Ehrenberg, Gotthelf Fischer von Waldheim, William Buckland, Charles Henry Dessalines d'Orbigny and Alcide Dessalines d'Orbigny, Charles Lucien Jules Laurent Bonaparte, the Duke of Orleans and the kings Louis-Philippe I and Christian VIII. To be admitted, you had to be introduced by a member and pay 18 francs per year. Other Parisian societies of this period that dealt with biology and published their own journals were (in addition to the Academy of Sciences) various societies named after Carl von Linnaeus, such as the Société Linnéenne de Paris (1821 to 1835, as well as an older society from 1787 to 1790 called the Société d'Histoire Naturelle de Paris) and various societies in the provinces (such as the Linnaeus Society, founded in Lyon in 1822, those in Normandy, northern France and Bordeaux), the Société entomologique de France, founded in 1832, the Société d'histoire naturelle de Paris (since 1831 Société des sciences naturelles de France), the Société philomatique de Paris (founded in 1788), which was generally devoted to science and philosophy, and the Société anatomique and the Société géologique.
