= Nointel, Oise =

Nointel
- Commune
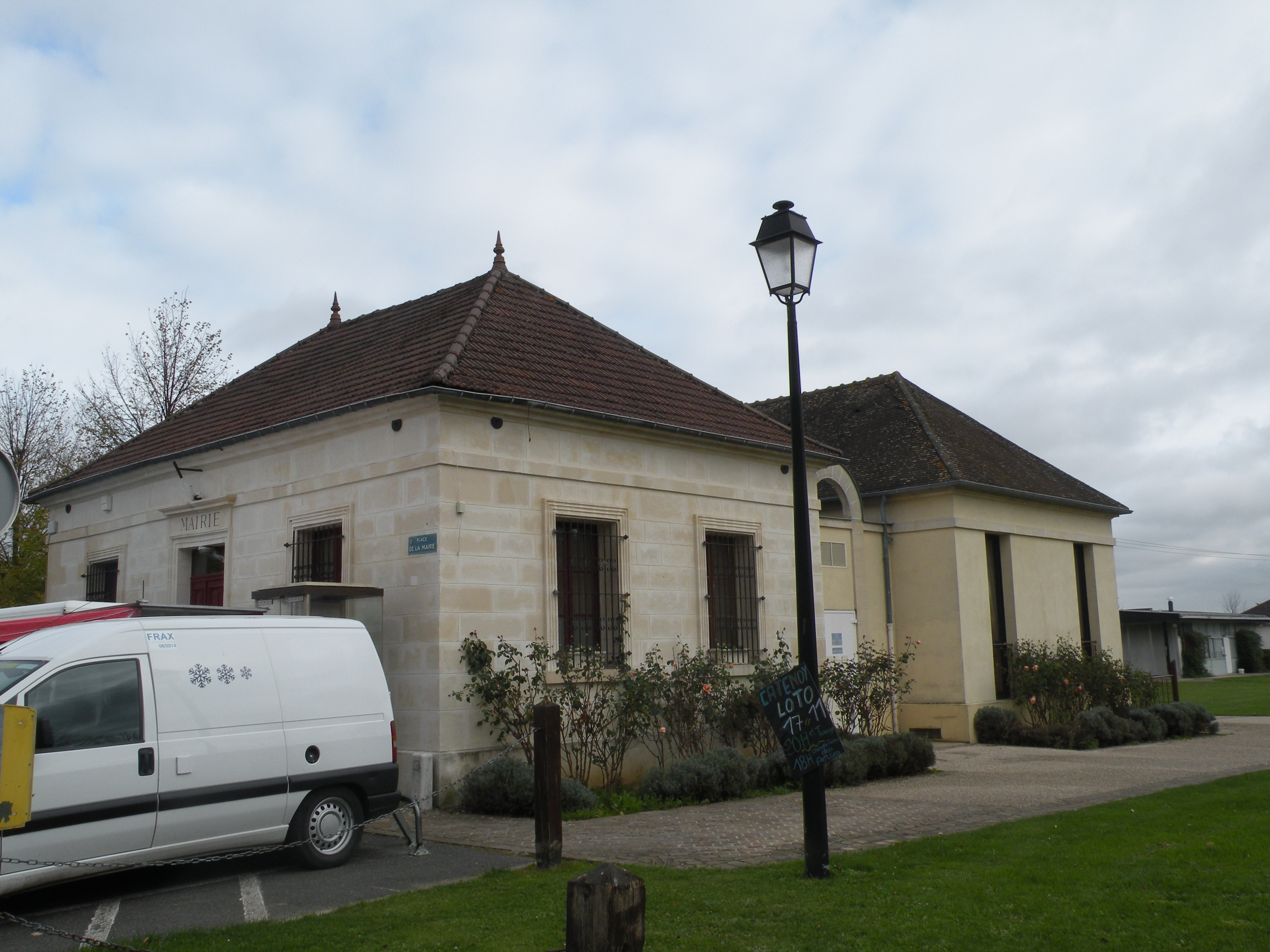
- The town hall in Nointel
- Location of Nointel
- Location within France Location within Hauts-de-France
- Coordinates: 49°22′32″N 2°28′58″E
- Country: France
- Region: Hauts-de-France
- Department: Oise
- Arrondissement: Clermont
- Canton: Clermont
- Intercommunality: CC Clermontois

Government
  - Mayor (2020–2026): Hélène Dufranne
- Area^{1}: 9.35 km^{2} (3.61 sq mi)
- Elevation: 66 m (217 ft)
- Highest elevation: 158 m (518 ft)
- Lowest elevation: 53 m (174 ft)
- Population (2023): 1,170
  - Density: 125/km^{2} (324/sq mi)
- Time zone: UTC+01:00 (CET)
  - Summer (DST): UTC+02:00 (CEST)
- INSEE/Postal code: 60464 /60840
- ^{1} French Land Register data, which excludes lakes, ponds, glaciers > 1 km^{2} (0.386 sq mi or 247 acres) and river estuaries.

Nointel (French pronunciation: [nwɛ̃tɛl]) is a commune in the Oise department in northern France.

== See also ==
- Communes of the Oise department
