= Hawking (birds) =

Feeding strategy in birds involving catching flying insects in the air

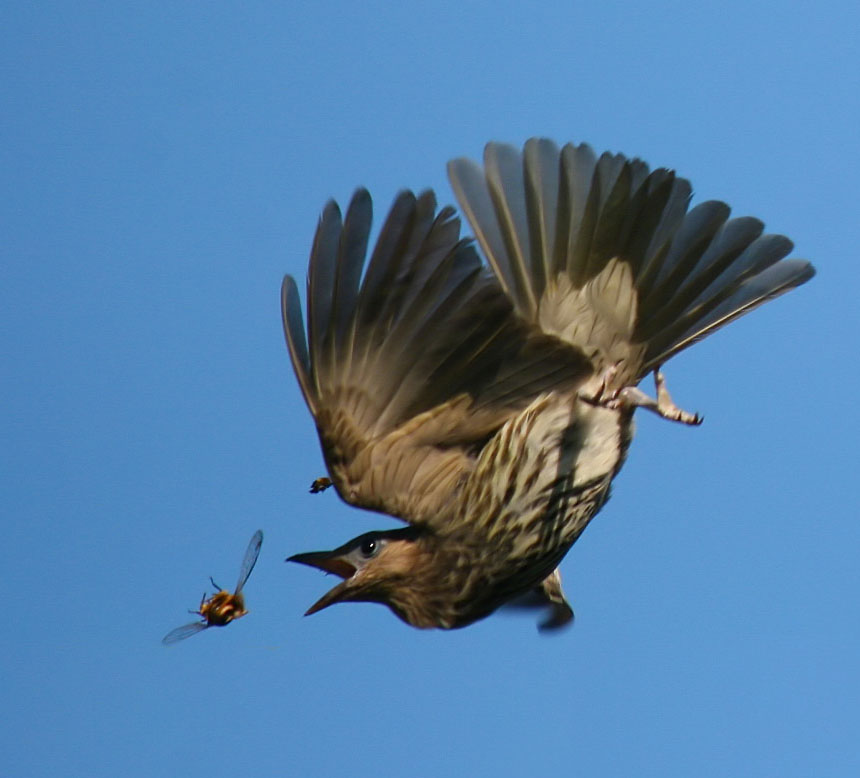
Australasian figbird, catching a beetle on the wing

Hawking is a feeding strategy in birds involving catching flying insects in the air. The term usually refers to a technique of sallying out from a perch to snatch an insect and then returning to the same or a different perch, though it also applies to birds that spend almost their entire lives on the wing. This technique is called "flycatching" and some birds known for it are several families of "flycatchers": Old World flycatchers, monarch flycatchers, and tyrant flycatchers; however, some species known as "flycatchers" use other foraging methods, such as the grey tit-flycatcher. Other birds, such as swifts, swallows, and nightjars, also take insects on the wing in continuous aerial feeding. The term "hawking" comes from the similarity of this behavior to the way hawks take prey in flight, although, whereas raptors may catch prey with their feet, hawking is the behavior of catching insects in the bill. Many birds have a combined strategy of both hawking insects and gleaning them from foliage.

== Flycatching ==
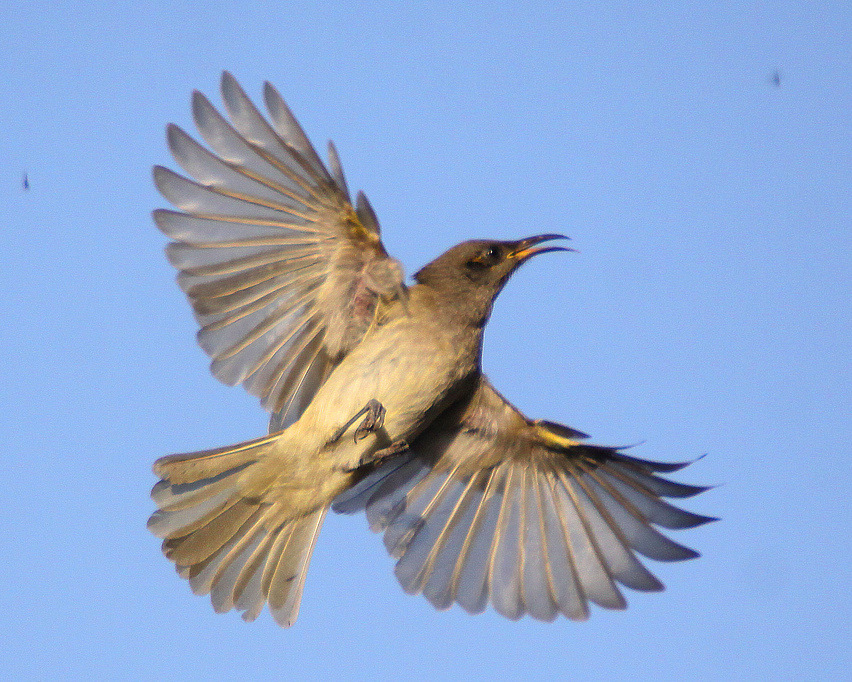
Brown honeyeater, one of a group hawking from a Casuarina

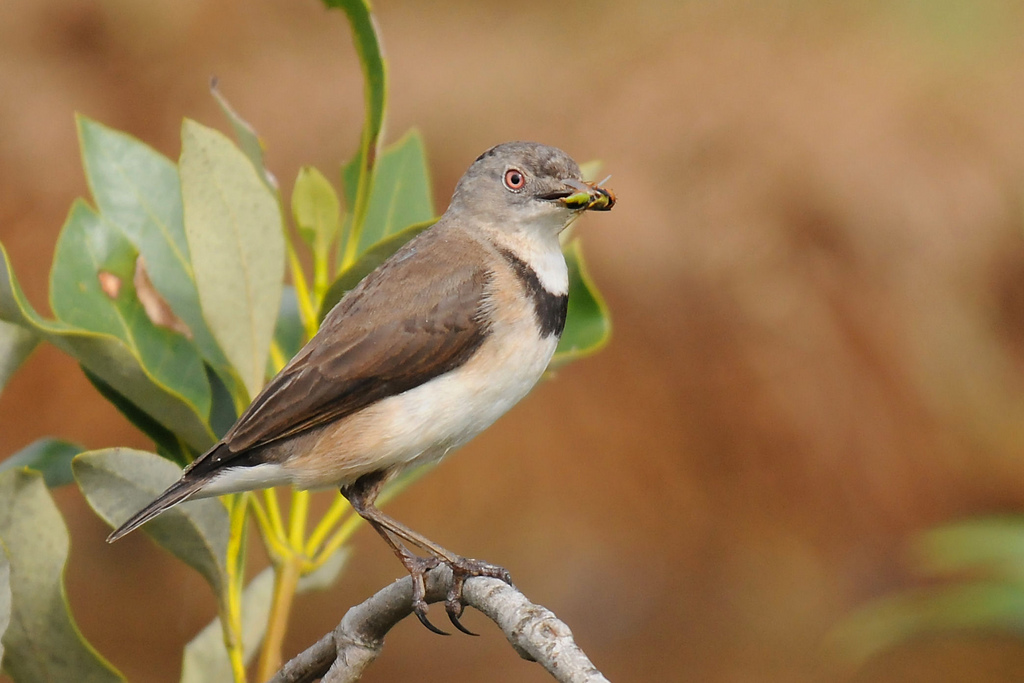
White-fronted chat, returning to a perch with insects caught in flight

The various methods of taking insects have been categorized as: gleaning (perched bird takes prey from branch or tree trunk), snatching (flying bird takes prey from ground or branch), hawking (bird leaves perch and takes prey from air), pouncing (bird drops to ground and takes prey) and pursuing (flying bird takes insects from air).

In hawking behavior, a bird will watch for prey from a suitable perch. When it spies potential prey, the bird will fly swiftly from its perch to catch the insect in its bill, then return to the perch or sometimes to a different perch. This maneuver is also called a "sally". Prey that is very small relative to the bird, such as gnats, may be consumed immediately while in flight, but larger prey, such as bees or moths, are usually brought back to a perch before being eaten. Sometimes the prey will attempt to escape and this can result in a fluttering pursuit before returning to the perch. Depending on the species of bird, there are observable variations on this behavior. Some species, such as the olive-sided flycatcher of North America and the ashy drongo of the Indian Subcontinent, tend to choose an exposed perch, such as a dead tree branch overlooking a clearing, whereas others, such as the North American Acadian flycatcher and the Asian small niltava perch within the cover of foliage deep in a forest or woodland habitat.

Many birds make use of a variety of tactics. A study of feeding behaviors in the family Tyrannidae categorized the following moves as ways of taking insect prey: aerial hawking (i.e. flycatching), perch-to-ground sallying, ground feeding (chasing after insects on the ground), perch-to-water sallying, sally-gleaning (can involve an hover-gleaning or a rapid strike), and gleaning while perched. Some tyrant flycatchers, such as those that choose a prominent perch from which to hawk insects, have more of a tendency to return to the same perch after each sally, while others, particularly those of the forest interior, show less of this tendency. A similar pattern is seen in Great Britain, where there are but two flycatchers, the spotted flycatcher and the pied flycatcher. The spotted flycatcher is the specialist, and tends to return to the same perch after each sally. The pied flycatcher is more of a generalist, gleaning as well as flycatching, and changes perches often.

Birds with the name "flycatcher" are not the only ones to engage in flycatching behavior. For example, Lewis's woodpecker feeds by flycatching. Some honeyeaters of Australasia employ hawking and gleaning as feeding tactics. Bee-eaters catch bees in a similar manner and return to the perch to remove the sting before consuming. Furthermore, many small owls take insect prey on the wing; examples include the western screech owl of North America and the brown boobook of Asia.

== Sustained-flight feeding ==
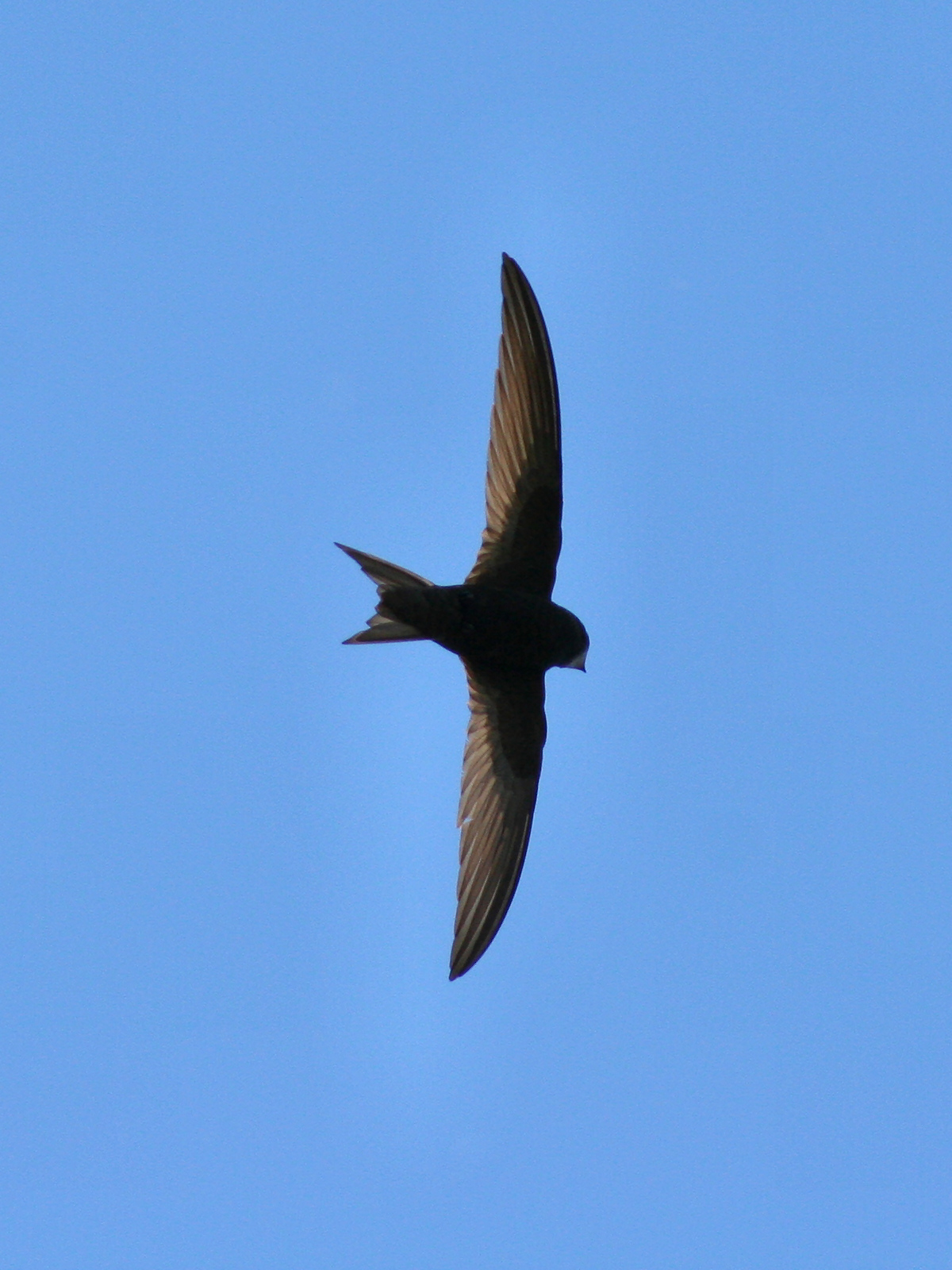
Common swift in flight

Continuous aerial feeding is a different way of hawking insects. It requires long wings and skillful flying, as in nightjars, swallows, and swifts. Swifts are the masters of aerial feeding; several species spend virtually their entire lives in the air (some non-mating common swifts have spent as much as 10 months in the air without landing), and have come to rely on insects as their main source of food. Swallows, though visually similar to swifts but being unrelated to them, feed in a similar manner, but less continuously, as they don't glide as much and they stop to perch for a while between bouts of aerial feeding. This has to do with their prey: swifts fly higher in pursuit of smaller, lighter insects that are scattered by rising air currents, while swallows generally chase after medium-sized insects that are lower to the ground, such as flies. When swallows fly higher to go after smaller insects, they adjust their flight style to glide more, like a swift. Birds of the nightjar family employ a variety of moves for catching insects. The common nighthawk of North America flies in swift-like fashion on its long, slender, pointed wings. The common poorwill, on the other hand, flies low and perches low to the ground and will sally up into the air after insects.

== Opportunistic feeding ==
Many other birds are known to engage in hawking as an opportunistic feeding technique or a supplemental source of nutrition: among these are the cedar waxwing, which mostly eats fruit but is also often observed hawking insects over streams; terns of the genus Chlidonias, such as the black tern, fly in search of insects, sometimes chasing after dragonflies in flight; and even large owls that normally feed on rodents will snatch flying insects when the opportunity arises.

== Physical adaptations ==
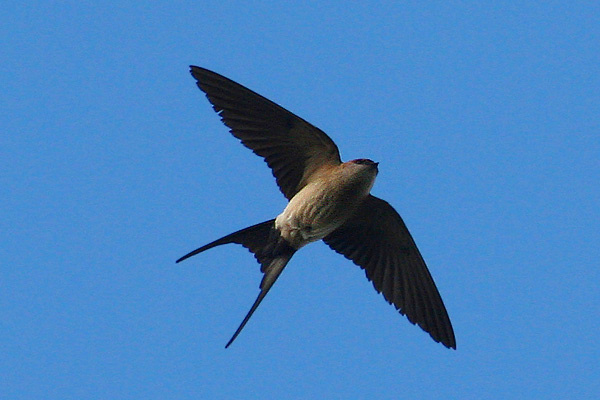
Red-rumped swallow in flight

Hawking insects, like any feeding strategy, must provide a bird with sufficient nourishment to make the expenditure of energy worthwhile. The strategies and tactics for feeding on airborne insects are inextricably related to the adaptations and lifestyles of the birds that employ them.

Flight, especially flight driven by the muscle-powered flapping of wings, is a strenuous physical activity. Although a sally from a perch may look like a single, rapid movement to the human eye, actually the bird must perform several moves: it begins its take-off by pushing with its feet to get into the air, it flaps its wings to generate forward motion (thrust), pursues the prey item, turns in the air, flies back, and, with a final flurry of wings, lands on its perch. When a bird hawks insects, the prey must be substantial enough to pay off in terms of a biological energy budget. In other words, the bird must take in more energy in food than it is using up in the pursuit of food. Therefore, flycatchers tend to prefer insect prey of moderate size, such as flies, over smaller insects like gnats.

For birds that live in a forest habitat or other setting where short bursts of flight are used in sallies or for getting from tree branch to tree branch, their short, rounded wings are suitable for the rapid flapping required to maneuver in tight spaces. Birds in more open settings that sally after larger insects like bees, such as kingbirds and bee-eaters, benefit from longer, more pointed wings, which are more efficient because they generate more lift and less drag. Swallows and swifts, which glide about in totally open spaces, have even longer wings. Another function of long, pointed wings is to enable these birds to turn quickly and smoothly in mid-glide. The wingtips create little vortices of air, within which the low air pressure creates additional lift on the wingtips. Furthermore, long, forked tails provide additional lift, stability, and steering ability, which is important for flying at slower speeds (swifts, though capable of flying very fast, actually must fly relatively slowly to intercept airborne insects). In fact, swifts have bodies so well adapted for flying that they are unable to perch on branches or land on the ground, and so they nest and roost on precipices such as rocky cliffs, behind waterfalls (as the American black swift of North America and the great dusky swift of South America are known to do) or in chimneys, as in the case of the chimney swift.

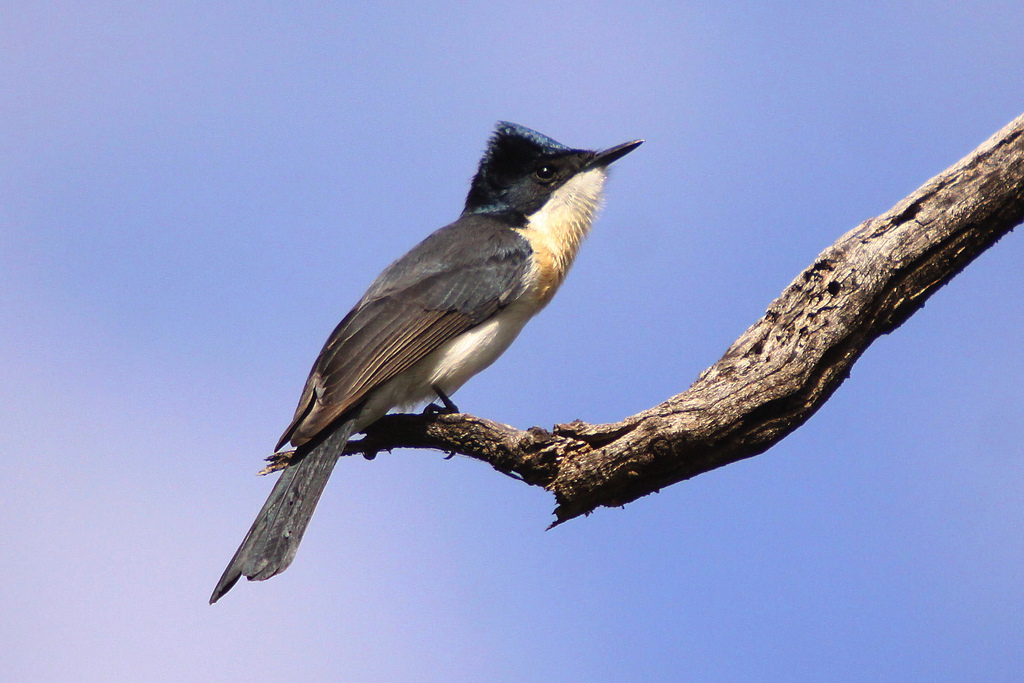
A restless flycatcher watches for insects

Bill size and shape is also important. Compared to the bills of birds specialized for gleaning, a relatively larger, broader bill is ideal for catching sizeable insects such as bees and flies. The presence of bristles near the bill (rictal bristles) in some flycatchers may be an adaptation for hawking insects; scientists are not sure of the function but they may help protect the eyes or they might actually help provide the bird sensory information as to the location of the prey. Swallows, swifts, and nightjars do not have large bills, but they have wide-gaping mouths. Some nightjars also have bristles around the bill (the common poorwill does, the common nighthawk does not).

When different kinds of birds have the same adaptations, such similarities are not necessarily indicative of any familial relationship between bird species. Rather, they are the result of convergent evolution. Consider, for example, the marked resemblance in body size, shape, and coloration between flycatchers of several families, though these species are not closely related: the Asian brown flycatcher (of the Muscicapidae or Old World flycatcher family), Acadian flycatcher (of the Tyrannidae or tyrant flycatcher family) of the New World, and slaty monarch (of the Monarchidae or monarch flycatcher family), endemic to Fiji. All three use flycatching to acquire some or all of their food. But these three families belong to separate branches of the evolutionary tree of songbirds, which diverged in two branching events some 60 and 90 million years ago and continued to evolve independently in different parts of the world. Likewise, the similarities of swifts and swallows once led naturalists to conclude they were related, but it is now established that they are unrelated, and that the same lifestyle has led to the same adaptations.

== Ecological implications ==
In temperate climates, the availability of flying insects as a food source is seasonal, and this is probably why many birds that rely on this food source during the breeding season migrate in winter. Migration is timed to the availability of the birds' preferred food. For instance, it has been observed in Great Britain that migrating swallows arrive earlier in the spring than swifts, this correlates with the later profusion of small insects that swifts feed on. Weather also affects the availability of flying insects. Swallows, for example, are obliged to go where the insects are, and depending on the weather they may adjust their choice of prey or be forced to seek out prey in different locations.

The preference for certain kinds of aerial insect as a food source seems to correlate with gregarious or colonial behavior versus territoriality. For birds that take advantage of swarming insects, which are by nature found in local concentrations, colonial breeding can be a successful strategy. An example is the cliff swallow of western North America. Its relative the barn swallow hunts larger, non-swarming insects, and is more solitary.

Certain neotropical tyrant flycatchers will join mixed-species foraging flocks, as will some Asian drongos. Such flocks stir up flying insects, which can then be picked off in quick sallies.
