= List of natural history dealers =

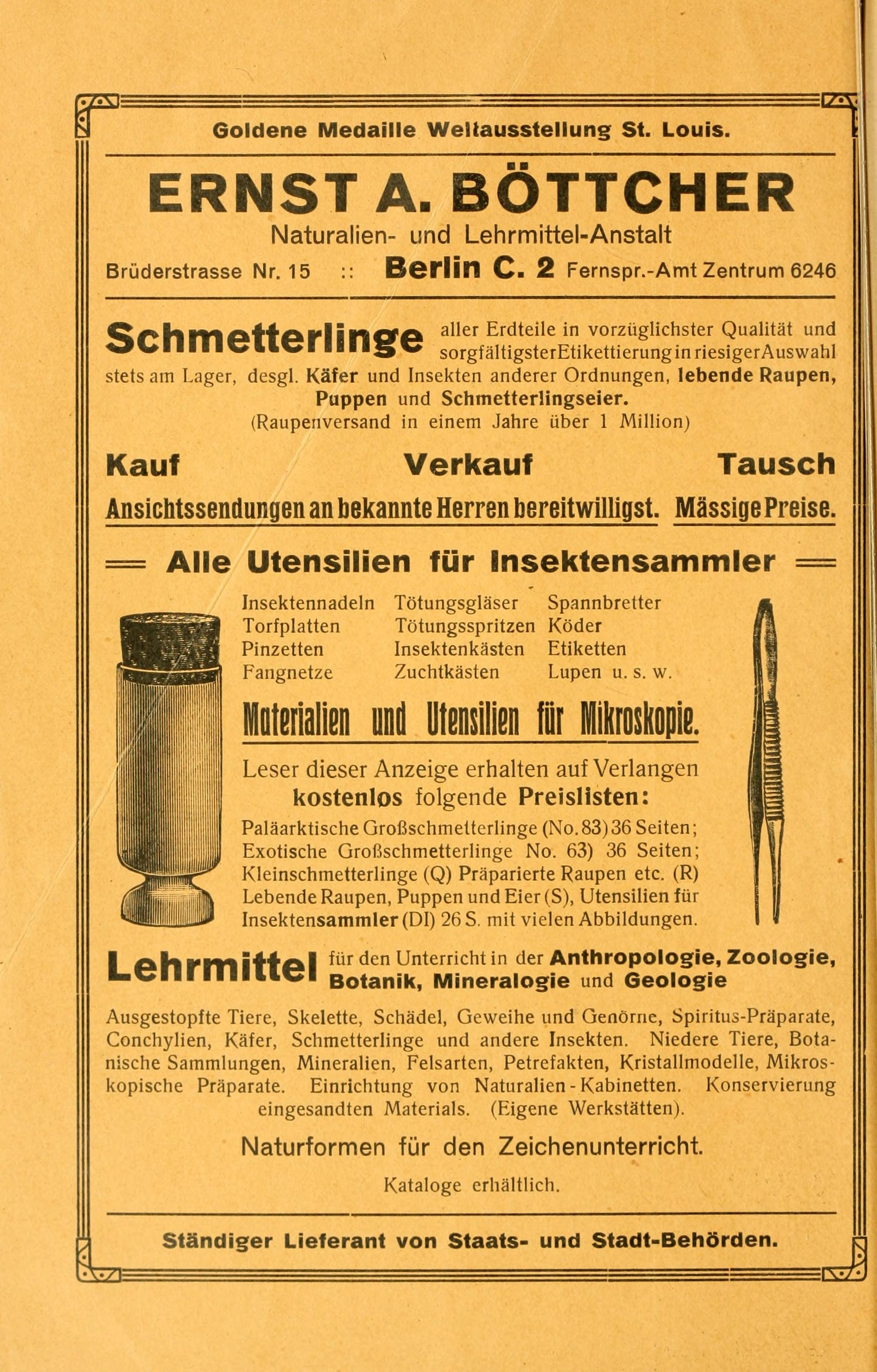
Advertisement Ernst A. Bottcher

Natural history specimen dealers had an important role in the development of science in the 18th, 19th and early 20th centuries. They supplied the rapidly growing, both in size and number, museums and educational establishments and private collectors whose collections, either in entirety or parts finally entered museums. Most sold not just zoological, botanical and geological specimens but also equipment and books. Many also sold archaeological and ethnographic items. They purchased specimens from professional and amateur collectors, sometimes collected themselves as well as acting as agents for the sale of collections. Many were based in mercantile centres notably Amsterdam, Hamburg, and London or in major cities. Some were specialists and some were taxonomic authorities who wrote scientific works and manuals, some functioned as trading museums or institutes.

This is a list of natural history dealers from the 16th to the 19th century: here are names that are frequently encountered in museum collections.

- Johan Hans Abegg (fl. 1882–1885) Mineral collector and dealer in Zurich.
- Augustus Theodore Abel (?1802-1882); German Mineral dealer resident in Ballarat.
- Anton Franz Abraham Preparator and dealer in educational materials at " "Naturhistorisches Institut" on Beatrixgasse, Vienna, 1896, on Ungargasse, Vienna in 1903–1906.Supplied specimens to Archduke Franz Ferdinand.
- Ludwig Anker (1822, Budapest -1887) Insektenhändler
- Mary Anning
- Bernardino Astfäller (1879–1964) Insektenhändler in Meran
- Louis Thomas Jérôme Auzoux Paris
- Andreas Bang-Haas
- Otto Bang-Haas
- Max Bartel (1879–1914) Berlin
- Leopold and Rudolf Blaschka
- Julius Böhm (c. 1850?-1925) Vienna mineral dealers as "Österr.-ungar. Mineralien-Comptoir" or Austro-Hungarian Mineral Dealership.
- Auguste Boissonneau (1802-1883, Paris) Bird skin dealer.
- Edward Percy Bottley Gregory, Bottley & Lloyd geology and mineral dealership
- Ernst August Böttcher, born 14 June 1870 Naturalien und Lehrmittel-Anstalt Berlin C. 2, Brüderstrasse 15.
- August Friedrich Böttcher
- Brazenor Bros Dealers in zoological specimens in Brighton from 1858 to 1937.
- Nérée Boubée Paris
- Adolphe Boucard
- Braun; Karl Friedrich Wilhelm (1800–1864) Fossil and mineral dealer in Regensburg de:Karl Friedrich Wilhelm Braun
- Brendel and Sohn Botanical modelmakers in Breslau and Berlin.
- Antonie Augustus Bruijn Dutch East Indies
- Jean Baptiste Lucien Buquet (Paris)
- Gustav Calliess (1871-1956) Insektenhändler in Guben
- Emile Clement Australia
- William Deans Cowan Madagascar
- Giuseppe De Cristoforis (Milan)
- Eduard Dämel Insect dealer in Hamburg.
- Robert Damon Natural history dealer in Weymouth
- Walter Dannatt Natural history dealer in Lee, London, mainly Lepidoptera.
- Jules Desbrochers des Loges French insect dealer.
- Émile Deyrolle (1838–1917) French naturalist and natural history dealer in Paris. The business was originally owned by his naturalist grandfather, Jean-Baptiste Deyrolle who opened his shop in 1831 at 23, Rue de la Monnaie. Émile's father Achille Deyrolle ran the business for many years. It is now at 46, rue du Bac, Paris
- Maarten Dirk van Renesse van Duivenbode trader of bird skins in the Dutch East Indies.
- Henri Donckier de Donceel Paris insect dealer
- Richard Henry Puech Dupont (1798 –1873) Paris trader (Quai Saint-Michel) in specimens of beetles and birds.
- Alfred William Ecutt (1879-) Newport, Wales.
- William Eling (also known as William Ealing, c.1790-1853), shell and marine specimen dealer based at Deptford.
- Entomologisch Institut Hamburg (E. M. Schulz) Hamburg 22, Hamburgerstrasse 45.
- Josef Erber(c. 1830 – c. 1918) Mineral and natural history dealer in Vienna St. Ullrich, Siebensterngasse No. 29.
- Anton Hermann Fassl Naturhistorisches-Institut, 948 Zeidlerstrasse, Teplitz, Bohemia, Germany (now the Czech Republic)
- Adolarius Jacob Forster (1739–1806).Leading mineral dealer of the 18th century with premises in London, Paris and St. Petersburg.
- R. Fuess Berlin - Steglitz mineral and petrographic specimens an instruments Heinrich Ludwig Rudolf Fuess (1838–1917)de:Rudolf Fuess.
- Gustav Adolph Frank (1809–1880) Natural history dealer in Amsterdam who had worldwide trade connections.
- Václav Frič (1839–1916) Prague
- Hans Fruhstorfer

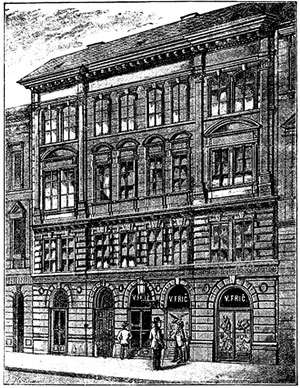
Václav Frič's shop at Wassergasse 736-II in Prague

- Alfred George Gabriel (1884–1968) English butterfly dealer who also worked for the British Museum.
- Otto Garlepp and Gustav Garlepp Otto (1864-1959) Gustav (1862 – 1907) South America
- Bruno Geisler (1857-1945) New Guinea bird skins
- Karl Ludwig Giesecke Mineral dealer in Copenhagen.
- Johann Cesar VI. Godeffroy The Godeffroy Museum and dealership.
- Richard Haensch Berlin
- Johann Wilhelm Adolf Hansemann (1784–1862) German insect dealer
- Thomas Hawkins

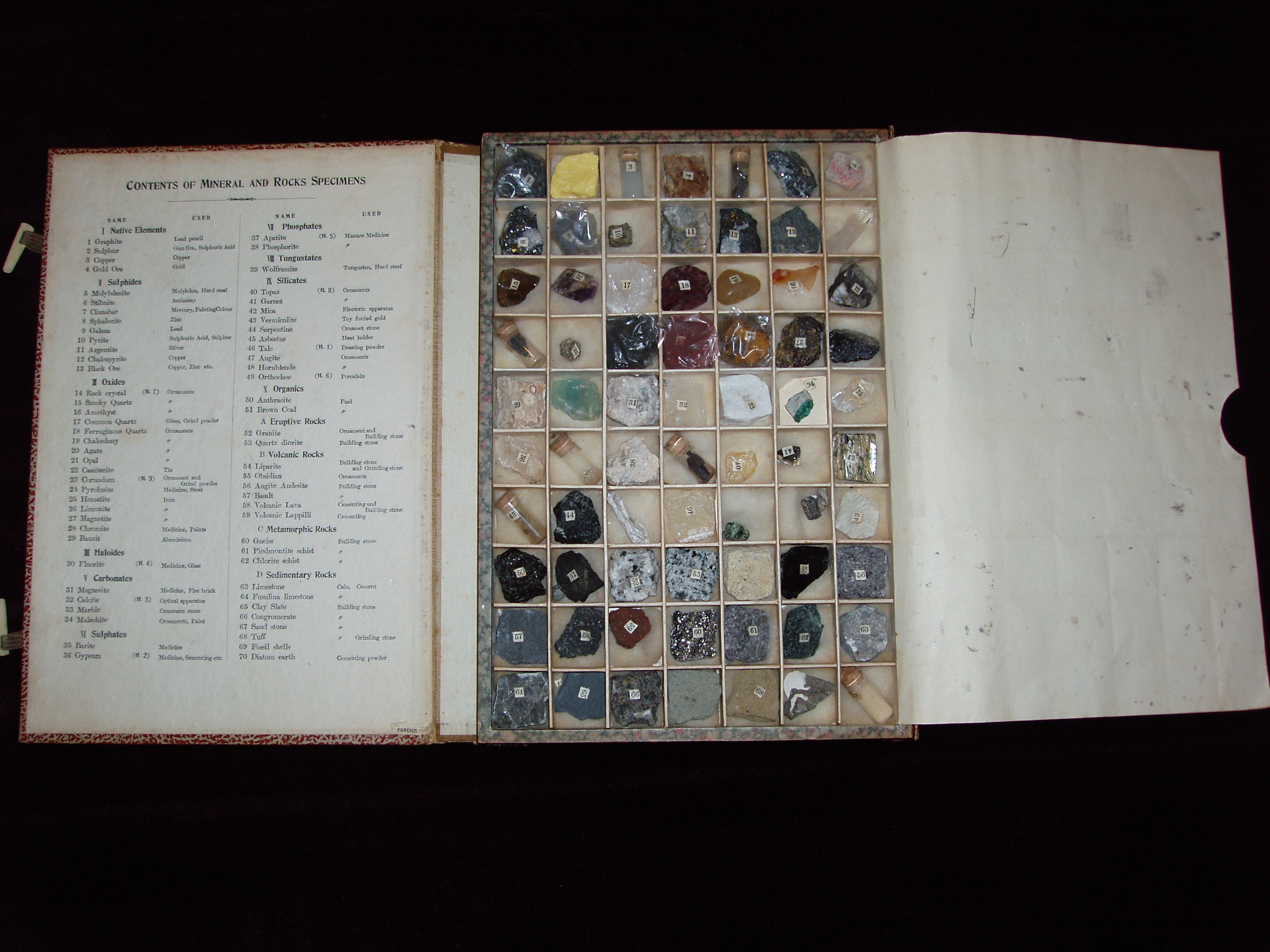
Mineral collection for schools.Germany.

- Henry Heuland (1778–1856) London Mineral collector and dealer
- Alexander Heyne Berlin
- George Humphrey London dealer in shells and ‘curiosities’ in the 18th century.
- Charles Jamrach
- Charles Georges Javet
- Edward Wesley Janson London
- Jan Kalinowski Peru
- Heinrich Kühn (naturalist) (1860-1906) Birds and butterflies East Indies, New Guinea
- Emil Riemel, Mühen, Augustenstrasse 41 Insect dealer
- Kny-Scheerer Company, 404 West Twenty- seventh street, New York. Agency for German dealers - specimens, equipment. Active 1900- 1930s?
- Friedrich Kohl (1839–1907) Fossil and mineral dealer

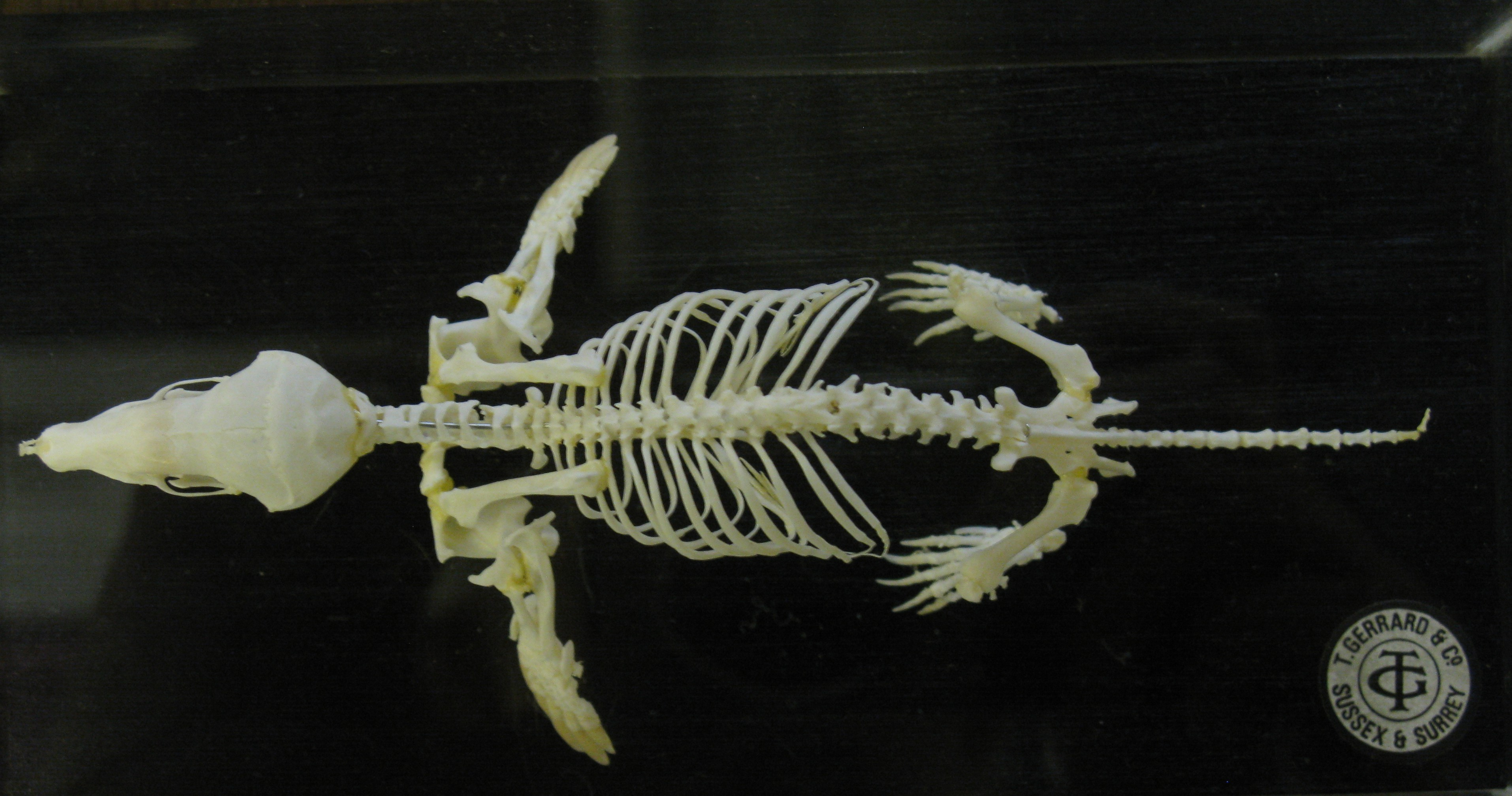
Mole skeleton supplied by T Gerrard & Co Ltd.

- Adam August Krantz (1809–1872); Natural history dealer in Berlin after 1850 in Bonn.
- Frank H. Lattin & Co. Albion, New York
- Benjamin Leadbeater (1760–1837) Dealer in ornithological specimens.
- Hermann von Maltzan (1843 – 1891) Conchology
- Charles Johnson Maynard (1845–1929) Natural history dealer in Boston and Newton, Massachusetts.
- Friedrich Christian Meuschen
- Heinrich Benno Möschler
- Eugène Le Moult
- August Müller
- Ida Laura Pfeiffer
- Maison Azoux
- Maison Tramond Established by the mid-19th century at 9 Rue de l' Ecole de Medicine in Paris. Later "Maison Tramond - N. Rouppert successeur".Models of human and comparative anatomy and osteological preparations.
- Albert Stewart Meek
- Wilhelm Neuburger Berlin (between 1900 and 1910) Insect dealer
- Heinrich Michael Neustetter Insect dealer, Vienna
- Friedrich Wilhelm Niepelt
- Gustav Paganetti-Hummler as Zoologische Institut für Balkanforschung des Gust. Paganetti-Hummler
- Ludwig Parreys (1796–1879) Parreys lived in Vienna, where he was dealer in natural history objects. Trading as Ludwig and Joseph Mann, he supplied zoological specimens to many leading taxonomists whose collections are now conserved by natural history museums.
- Émile Parzudaki (1829-1899) and Charles Parzudaki 2 rue Bouloi, Paris, mainly bird mounts and skins.
- Andrew Pritchard London
- Max Quedenfeldt Berlin insect dealer.
- Orazio Querci (and family). Butterfly dealer in Florence, Italy - collected extensively in Spain and Portugal also Cuba. Supplied butterflies to Roger Verity and European butterflies to R.C. Williams, Academy of Natural Sciences, Philadelphia.
- Lovell Augustus Reeve

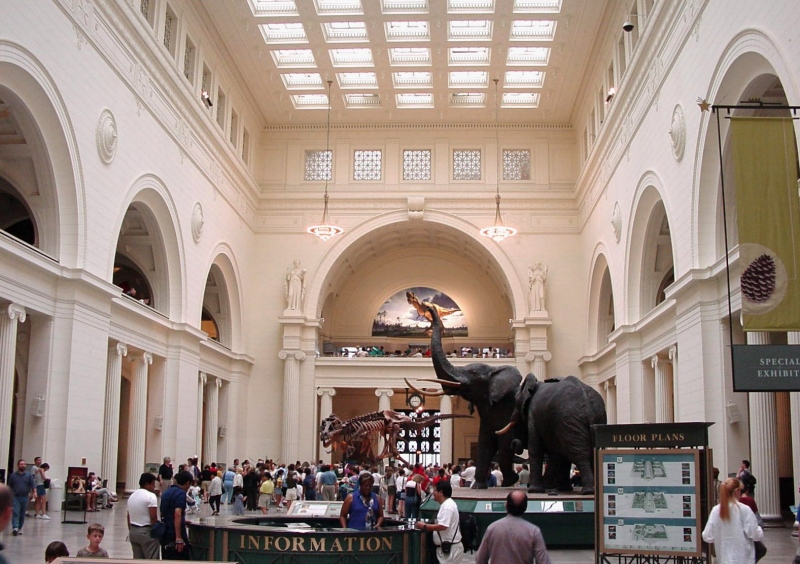
The Field Museum in Chicago. Late entrants United States museums were major purchasers.

- Edmund Reitter "Natural History Institute" 1879 -1880 Vienna, 1881-1891 Mödling, after 1891 Paskau and Munich (extant).
- Carl Ribbe
- Heinrich Ribbe (1832–1898) Entomologist and dealer in Berlin
- Hermann Rolle Berlin
- William Frederick Henry Rosenberg (1868–1957) 57 Haverstock Hill, London fl. 1920s. Claimed to hold 5,000 bird species as scientific skins (and to be the largest bird skin dealership in the world). Supplier to museums and private collectors. Traveller.
- Emil Adolf Rossmässler Natural History dealer
- Karl Rost
- Fritz Rühl
- Auguste Sallé
- L.W. Schaufuß else E. Klocke, Dresden
- Christian Julius Wilhelm Schiede
- Wilhelm Schlüter
- Gustav Schneider (1867–1958) Basel
- Gustav Schrader
- Wilhelm Schlüter
- Abraham Scrivener (fl. 1840s) naturalist and merchant with a shop at Deptford Bridge, Greenwich.
- Paul Smart
- Southwick & Jencks’ Natural History Store Providence, Rhode Island
- Otto Staudinger
- Stazione Zoologica Anton Dohrn Marine specimens.
- Wilh. Steeg "Dr. Steeg & Reuter" after 1879. Crystallographic microscope slides.
- Alexandre Stuer(fl. 1890s-1920?) Paris mineral dealer. Owner of Comptoir Géologique et Minéralogique, 40, rue de Mathurins and at 4, rue de Castellane.
- John Crace Stevens Covent Gardens auctioneer.
- Emanuel Sweerts (1552–1612) Dutch merchant and natural history dealer.

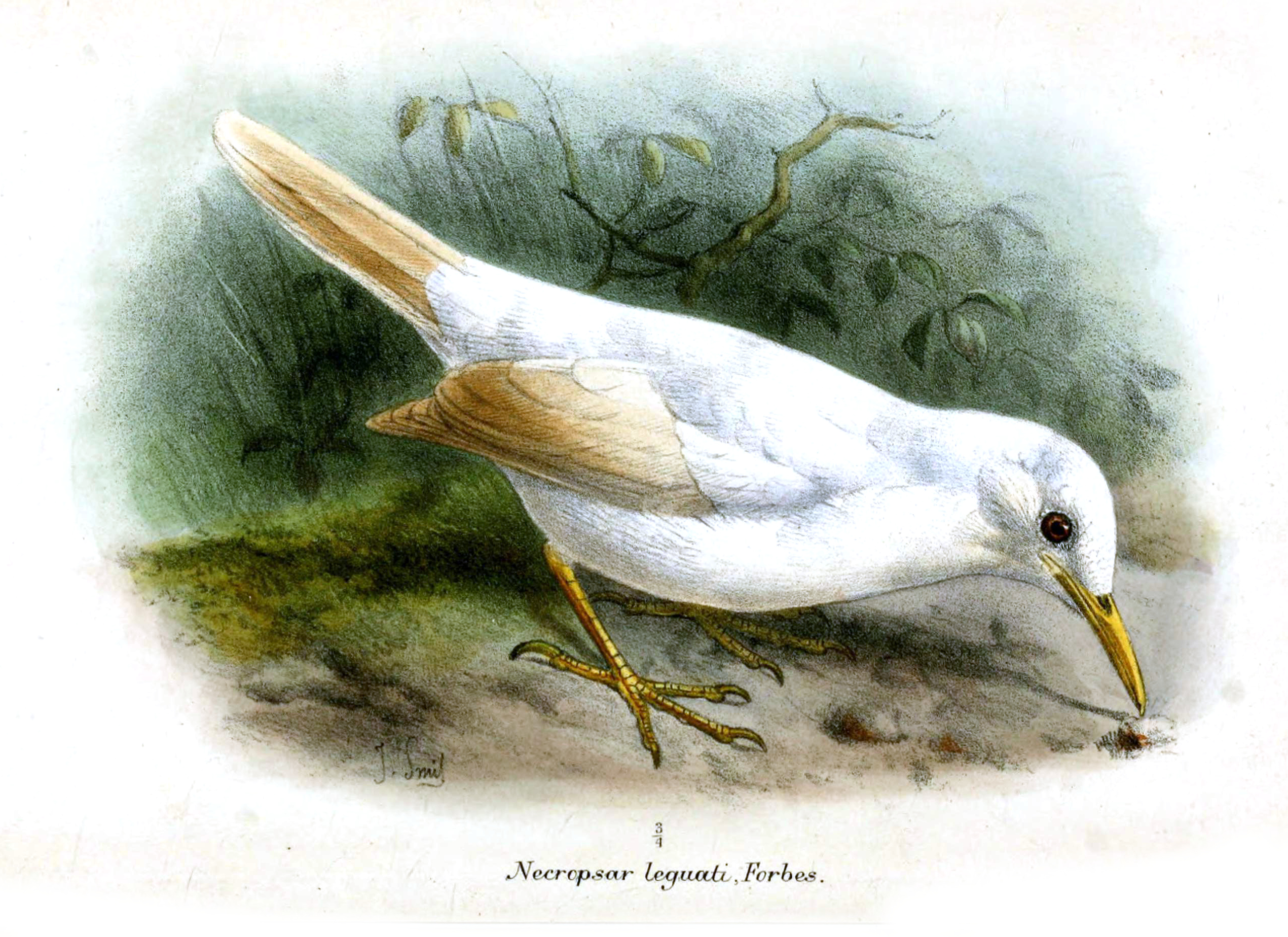
The grey trembler. In 1898 a unique skin was discovered in the Liverpool Museum. This specimen was obtained by Edward Smith-Stanley, 13th Earl of Derby from bird collector Jules Verreaux in 1850. It was labeled only "Madagascar"

- Rudolf Tancré (1842–1934) Anklam, Pomerania Dealer in Lepidoptera mainly of Central Asia and Siberia.
- Georg Thorey - Hamburg pharmacist and beetle collector. Also sold beetles to other natural history collectors.
- Johann Friedrich Gustav Umlauff (1833–1889) Proprietor of prominent Hamburg-based natural history and ethnographic dealership and associated museum.
- Unio Itineraria a German Scientific Society based in Esslingen am Neckar sold specimens as a dealership.
- Van Ingen & Van Ingen
- Jules Verreaux Owner of Maison Verreaux, established in 1803 by his father, Jacques Philippe Verreaux, at Place des Vosges in Paris, which was the earliest known company that dealt with objects of natural history.
- Jean Villet Cape Town
- Voigt & Hochgesang Göttingen
- Józef Warszewicz Guatemala 1844–1850
- Henry Augustus Ward Founder of Ward's Natural History Establishment in Rochester, New York.
- Rowland Ward London
- White Watson
- William Watkins Began trading in 1874 in Eastbourne. In 1879 the address was 36 The Strand, London. In 1907 the dealership became Watkins & Doncaster (1907). In 1937 ownership passed to Frederick Metté an expert on bird eggs.
- Frank Blake Webster's Naturalists Supply Depot 409 Washington Street, Hyde Park, Massachusetts
- Walter Freeman Webb (1869–1957) Shell dealer St. Petersburg, Florida
- Henry Whitely
- Bryce McMurdo Wright father (1814–1875) or son (1850–1895), both with same name and both dealers at 90 Great Russell Street, London. They dealt in minerals and fossils, ethnographic and archaeological objects.
- Bohuslav Železný Prague 1890-? Lepidoptera.
- Karl Wahnes New Guinea, Borneo, Solomon Islands Leipoptera, Coleoptera, Birds
- Emil Weiske Saalfeld Insect and bird collector and dealer.
- Rudolf Zimmermann (1878–1943) mineralogist and dealer in natural history specimens for schools based in Chemnitz, Saxony. Author of Die Mineralien. Eine Anleitung zum Sammeln und Bestimmen derselben nebst einer Beschreibung der wichtigsten Arten

== See also ==
- Insektenbörse
- Taxidermists
