= Ribbe =

Ribbe is a surname of German origin. People with that name include:

- Carl Ribbe (1860–1934), German explorer and entomologist
- Claude Ribbe (born 1954), French writer, historian, philosopher, and filmmaker
- Heinrich Ribbe (1832–1898), German entomologist
- Markus Ribbe, American chemist

== See also ==
- Ribbe's glassy acraea, a common name for the butterfly Acraea leucographa
- The Norwegian Christmas dish is described at Pork ribs § Other cuts and preparations
