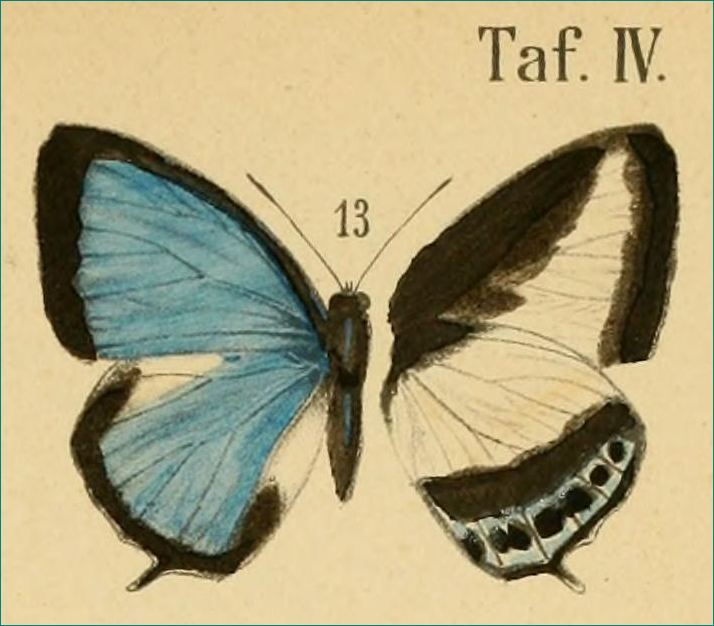
- Arhopala pagenstecheri male, Bismarck Archipelago from original description.

Scientific classification
- Kingdom: Animalia
- Phylum: Arthropoda
- Clade: Pancrustacea
- Class: Insecta
- Order: Lepidoptera
- Family: Lycaenidae
- Genus: Arhopala
- Species: A. pagenstecheri

Binomial name
- Arhopala pagenstecheri (Ribbe, 1899)

= Arhopala pagenstecheri =

Species of butterfly

Arhopala pagenstecheri is a butterfly in the family Lycaenidae. It was described by Carl Ribbe in 1899. It is found in the Australasian realm where it is endemic to New Britain. The specific name honours Arnold Pagenstecher. It may be a subspecies of Arhopala florinda (Grose-Smith, 1896).
