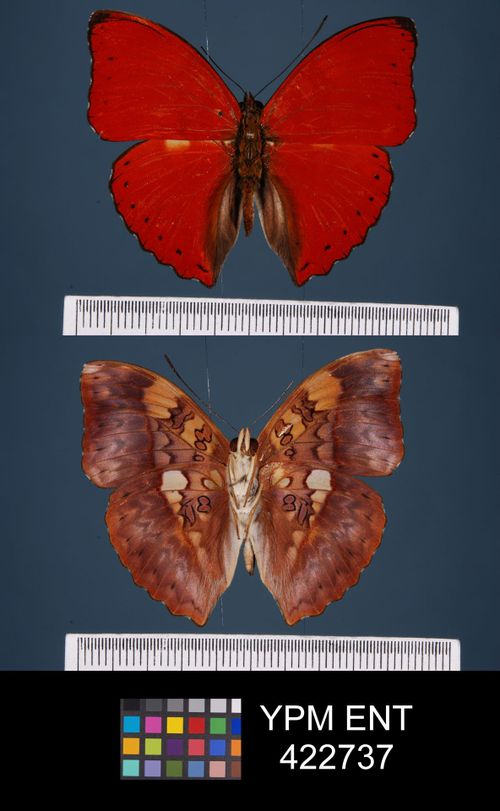

Scientific classification
- Kingdom: Animalia
- Phylum: Arthropoda
- Class: Insecta
- Order: Lepidoptera
- Family: Nymphalidae
- Genus: Cymothoe
- Species: C. excelsa

Binomial name
- Cymothoe excelsa Neustetter, 1912

Synonyms
- Cymothoe aramis excelsa Neustetter, 1912; Cymothoe excelsa f. schultzei Overlaet, 1944; Cymothoe caenis ab. talboti Overlaet, 1952; Cymothoe excelsa deltoides f. kapangae Overlaet, 1944; Cymothoe excelsa deltoides f. emundata Overlaet, 1944; Cymothoe excelsa f. ueleana Overlaet, 1944; Cymothoe excelsa f. rubricata Overlaet, 1944; Cymothoe excelsa regispoldi f. diffusa Overlaet, 1944; Cymothoe excelsa f. hutereauae Overlaet, 1944; Cymothoe excelsa fontinalis Overlaet, 1952

= Cymothoe excelsa =

Species of butterfly

Cymothoe excelsa, the scalloped red glider, is a butterfly in the family Nymphalidae. It is found in Nigeria, Cameroon, the Republic of the Congo, the Central African Republic, the Democratic Republic of the Congo and Angola.

The larvae feed on Rinorea species.

== Subspecies ==
- Cymothoe excelsa excelsa (Nigeria: Cross River loop, Cameroon, Congo, Central African Republic)
- Cymothoe excelsa deltoides Overlaet, 1944 (Democratic Republic of the Congo: Lualaba, Angola: southern Cabinda)
- Cymothoe excelsa regisleopoldi Overlaet, 1944 (Democratic Republic of the Congo: Ubangi, Mongala, Uele, Ituri, north Kivu, Tshopo, Equateur)
