= August Müller (ornithologist) =

German dealer of naturalia, entomologist and ornithologist (1853–1913)

August Müller (19 July 1853 in Eichelsdorf – 1913 in Berlin) was a German natural history dealer, entomologist and ornithologist. August Müller studied natural sciences from 1877 to 1881 at the University of Halle and in 1880 at the Friedrich-Wilhelms-Universität zu Berlin, and received his doctorate in 1882 from the University of Erlangen with his dissertation Die Ornis der Insel Salanga sowie Beiträge zur Ornithologie der peninsula Malacca. A zoogeographical study that was printed by Gottfried Pätz in Naumburg an der Saale and published in the Journal für Ornithologie in the same year. During his studies in Halle an der Saale, he worked for the natural history dealer Wilhelm Schlüter (1828–1919) for a time. After 1882, August Müller took over the Natural History Institute "Linnaea", founded in 1879 by Hermann von Maltzan in Frankfurt am Main at Große Eschenheimer Straße 45, and later continued it in Berlin. From 1887 it was located as the Natural History Institute "Linnaea" at Luisenplatz 6 in Berlin, where the zoologist Paul Matschie often worked and the entomologist and later natural history dealer Richard Haensch worked as an assistant in 1892. From 1894 onwards, the "Linnaea" was located in Berlin at Novalisstrasse 16 and later at Turmstrasse 19. The natural history and teaching materials business run by August Müller isolated insects of the world and sold teaching aids from the entire field of descriptive natural sciences.

He corresponded with Ernst Haeckel of the University of Jena and Franz Steindachner of the Natural History Museum in Vienna, was a corresponding member of the Offenbach Society for Natural History in 1880 and from 1880 a member of the German Ornithological Society led by Eugen Ferdinand von Homeyer and after 1885 a member of the Berlin Entomological Society, founded in 1856 by Ernst Gustav Kraatz.
