= Heinrich Kühn (naturalist) =

German naturalist (1860–1906)

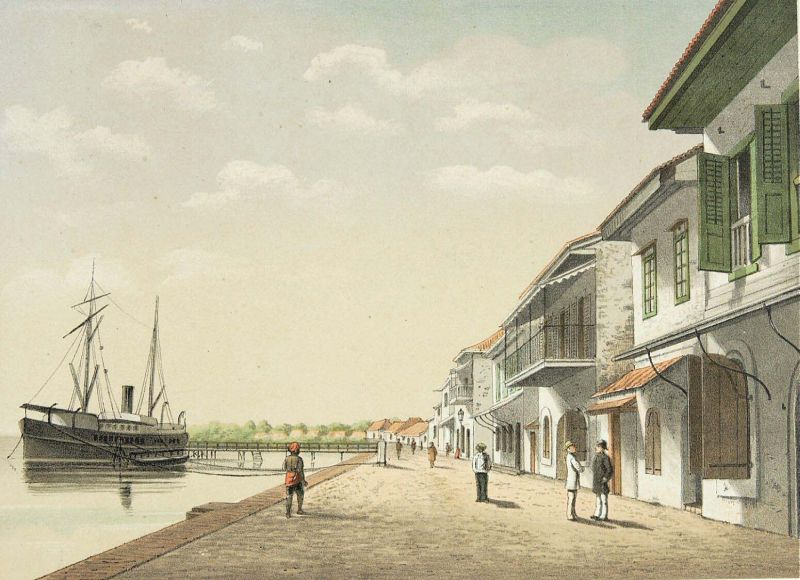
Makassar c. 1882

Heinrich Kühn (8 February 1860 in Erlbach - 26. August 1906 in Surabaya) was a German naturalist, entomologist and explorer

In 1882, Heinrich Kühn embarked on a journey to the Dutch East Indies on behalf of Heinrich Ribbe together with Ribbe's eldest son Carl Ribbe, collected with him on Celebes and the Aru Islands, explored the east coast of Celebes and later (alone) the island of Bangkai.He returned to Germany in 1886 where in 1885, the entomologist Johannes Röber had already made the first published accounts of the collection material. In 1887 he travelled to the Malay Archipelago and collected ethnographic objects for the Museum für Völkerkunde in Berlin with Johan Adrian Jacobsen. While Jacobsen returned to Germany in 1888, Kühn stayed in the southeastern area of the Moluccas on the Kei Islands to operate a sawmill and establish a coconut plantation. After economic success failed to materialize, he devoted himself more to collecting activities and collected on the Lesser Sunda Islands, Southwest Islands, Damar Island, Banda Islands and the northwestern tip of New Guinea. The collection results of these journeys, which mainly include birds, butterflies and beetles and form the focus of his research activities, he entrusted above all to Walter Rothschild, for his Tring museum, which opened in 189. His finds were edited and published in several works in the Novitates Zoologicae In honour of Heinrich Kühn, numerous birds, butterflies and beetles were subsequently named. In 1903 he returned to Germany in search of investors for his plantation company, married an Englishwoman in London a little later and in the spring of 1905 made a new start in Tual on the Kei Islands together with his wife, but died the following year in a hospital in Surabaya. He had been a member of the Entomological Society Iris zu Dresden since 1887. The ornithologist Ernst Hartert named in his honour, among other birds, the Ambon-eyed bird Zosterops kuehni Hartert, 1906, and the Kisar barn owl Tyto javanica kuehni Hartert, 1929, a subspecies of the eastern barn owl, which is only found on the Indonesian island of Kisar. In November 1883, the Dresden Museum of Ethnology acquired the first cultural objects collected by Carl Ribbe and Heinrich Kühn on the Aru Islands. The purchase of the Kühn collection for the Ethnographic Museum was mainly financed by the German explorer, anthropologist and patron Arthur Baessler.

== Works ==
- Excursionen im ostindischen Archipel. In: Correspondenz-Blatt des Entomologischen Vereins "Iris" zu Dresden, 1, Dresden 1. Oktober 1884, Seite 4–8.
- Instinct oder Ueberlegung. In: Correspondenz-Blatt des Entomologischen Vereins "Iris" zu Dresden, 4, Dresden 15. Juni 1887, Seite 118.
- Zur Kenntniss indischer Lepidopterenlarven. In: Correspondenz-Blatt des Entomologischen Vereins "Iris" zu Dresden, 4, Dresden 15. Juni 1887, Seite 179–183.
