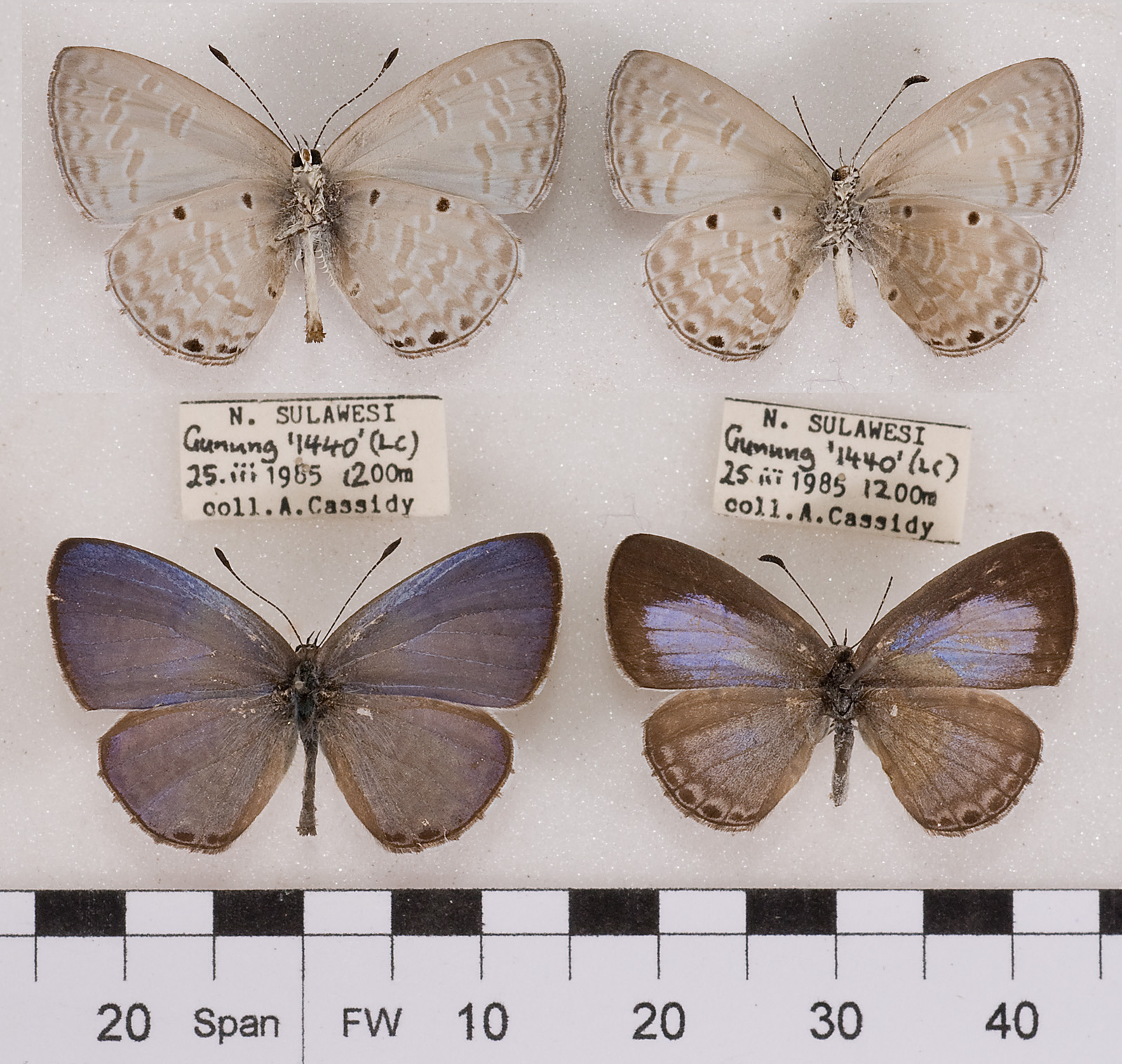

Scientific classification
- Domain: Eukaryota
- Kingdom: Animalia
- Phylum: Arthropoda
- Class: Insecta
- Order: Lepidoptera
- Family: Lycaenidae
- Genus: Monodontides
- Species: M. kolari

Binomial name
- Monodontides kolari (Ribbe, 1926)

Synonyms
- Cyaniris kolari Ribbe, 1926

= Monodontides kolari =

Species of butterfly

Monodontides kolari is a butterfly of the family Lycaenidae. It is found on Sulawesi.
