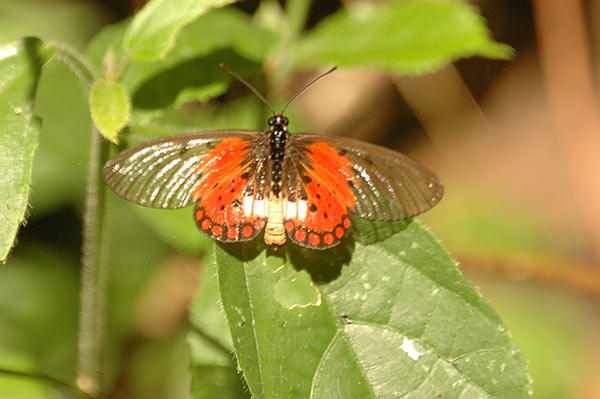

Scientific classification
- Kingdom: Animalia
- Phylum: Arthropoda
- Class: Insecta
- Order: Lepidoptera
- Family: Nymphalidae
- Genus: Acraea
- Species: A. leucographa

Binomial name
- Acraea leucographa Ribbe, 1889

Synonyms
- Acraea (Acraea) leucographa; Acraea admatha ab. gyldenstorpei Aurivillius, 1925; Acraea leucographa f. sinalba Pierre, 1979

= Acraea leucographa =

Species of butterfly

Acraea leucographa, the Ribbe's glassy acraea, is a butterfly of the family Nymphalidae. It is found in Ivory Coast, Ghana, Nigeria, Cameroon, Gabon, the Republic of the Congo, the Central African Republic, Angola, the southern part of the Democratic Republic of the Congo, Uganda, western Kenya, western Tanzania and north-western Zambia.

== Description ==
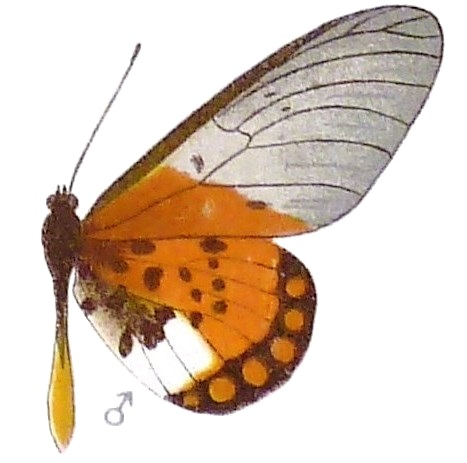

A. leucographa Ribbe (53 e) only differs from admatha in having cellules 1 b to 2 of the hindwing white between the discal dots and the marginal band. Sierra Leone to Abyssinia and British East Africa.

== Biology ==
The habitat consists of forests.

The larvae feed on Rinorea species.

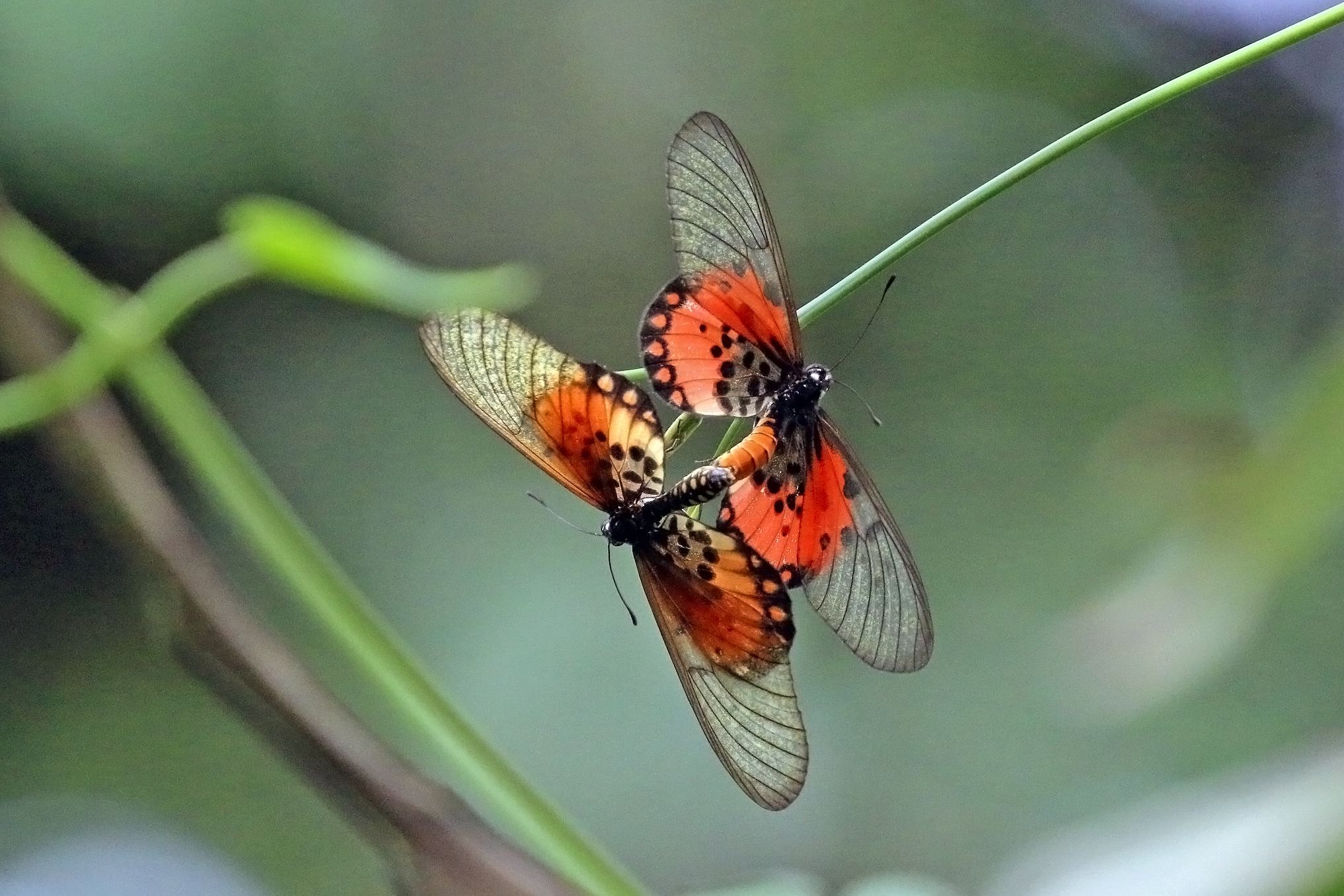
mating, Ghana

== Taxonomy ==
It is a member of the Acraea terpsicore species group - but see also Pierre & Bernaud, 2014
