= Robert William Plant =

English plant collector (1818–1858)

Robert William Plant (baptised 3 May 1818, in Lewisham – 1858) was an English plant collector, one of the sons of Robert Benjamin Glyddon Plant and Ann Caroline Plant. and described by Sir Joseph Paxton as 'a zealous and industrious experimental cultivator and nurseryman'. In the 1850s he collected in the Colony of Natal in South Africa.

Before emigrating to South Africa in 1850 he had published "The New Gardener's Dictionary or Catalogue of all the really good flowers, fruits, trees, and shrubs, cultivated in Great Britain" published by R. Groombridge and Sons in 3 parts, the first in 1849.

Once in South Africa he collected for Samuel Stevens, a London dealer in 'curiosities of natural history'. His collections also included beetles, butterflies, bird skins and shells. He published a paper on the Zulu Kingdom which led to a request by the Royal Botanic Gardens at Kew to compile a Flora natalensis. While collecting material for this work Plant contracted malaria in Maputaland, dying at Lake St. Lucia in 1858.

== See also ==
- Nominative determinism
