= Rudolf Tancré =

German natural history dealer

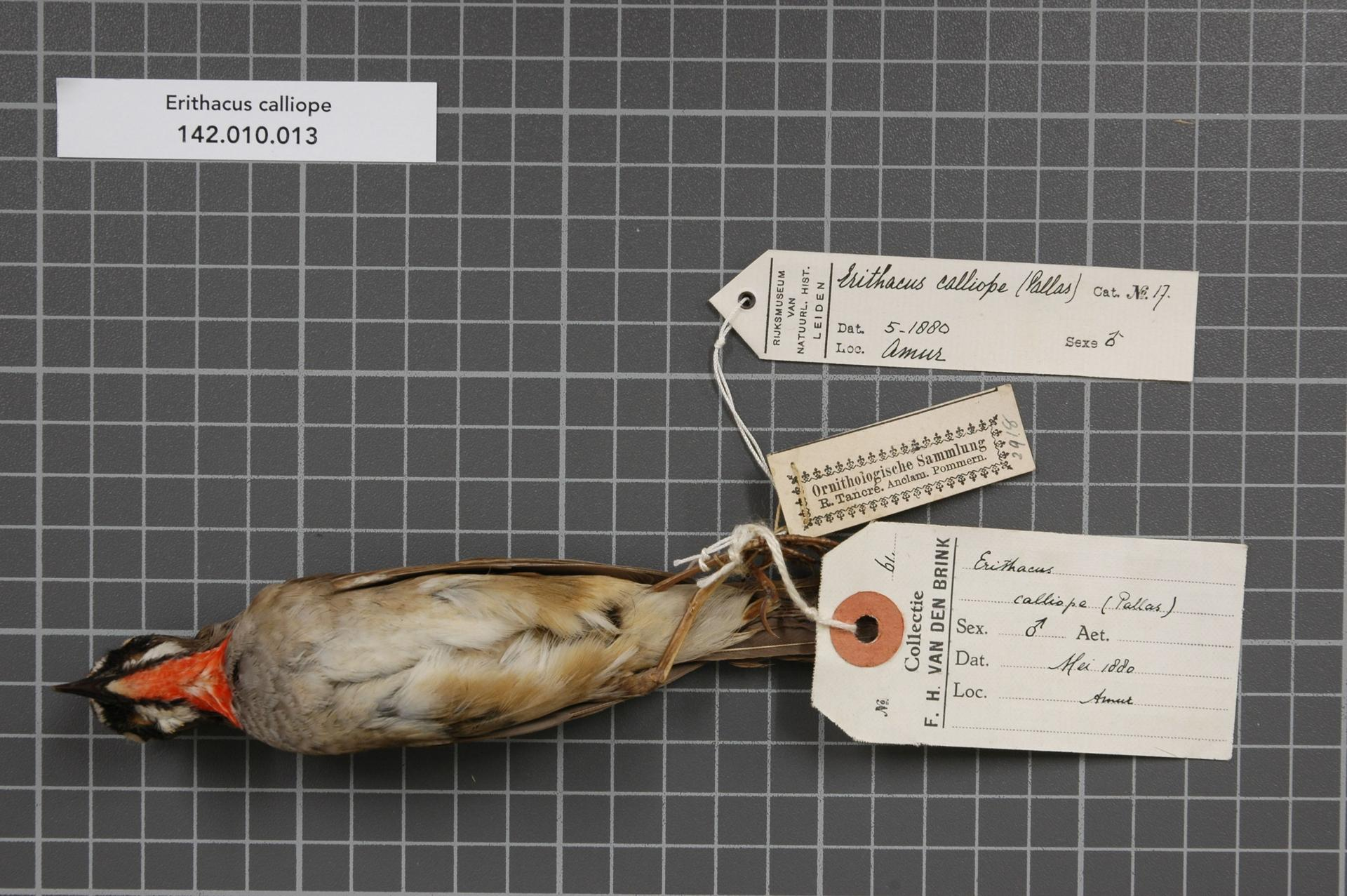
A specimen of Erithacus calliope collected by Rudolf Tancré and purchased by Rijksmuseum van Natuurlijke Historie, Leiden.

Rudolf Tancré ( December 24, 1842 Anklam, Pomerania – 19 September 1934 Anklam) was a German natural history dealer, ornithologist and entomologist whose Tancré Trade Company in Anklam had employed the German collector brothers Rückbeil, who had made extensive collections of birds and insects while exploring the Russian Far East, and the East and the South of Siberia.The Rückbeil family had contact with Grigory Grum-Grshimailo another source of expedition specimens for Tancré.

Tancré obtained specimens from Eastern Europe as well as Central Asia. He traded with European museums and private collectors, for instance Alexander Koenig and the bird curators at Tring Ernst Hartert and Karl Jordan. Insect collections were sold to various European museums and nowadays some of the collections are in the museums of Amsterdam, Bonn, Braunschweig and Linz and in the National Museum of "Grigore Antipan" in Bucharest . He named the butterfly Limenitis homeyeri for one of his customers Alexander von Homeyer. He cowrote the original description of Perdix perdix robusta Homeyer and Tancré, 1883.

== Works ==
- Tancre, R[udolf]. Das Steppenhuhn, Syrrhaptes paradoxus, Pall., b'ei Anklam. Wien Ornith. Ver. Mitth., 12, 1888, 108–109.
- Homeyer, E. F. Von, & Tancre, C. A. Beitrage zur Kenntniss der Ornithologie Westsibiriens, namentlich der Altai-Gegend. Mittheilungen des Ornithologischen Vereins in Wien 1883, pp. 81–92 NB C.A. not R.
