= August Friedrich Böttcher =

German entomologist

August Friedrich Böttcher (5 October 1825 – 20 November 1900) was a German entomologist.

He was born in Thorn and went later to Berlin, where he became an insect dealer.
