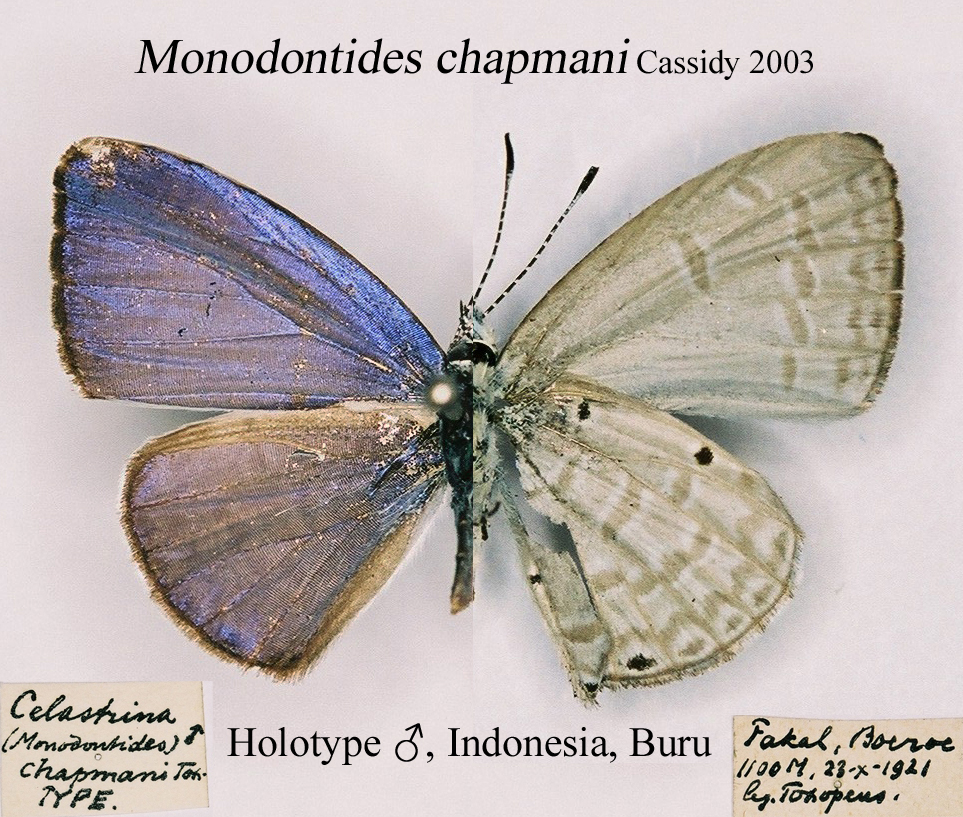

Scientific classification
- Domain: Eukaryota
- Kingdom: Animalia
- Phylum: Arthropoda
- Class: Insecta
- Order: Lepidoptera
- Family: Lycaenidae
- Genus: Monodontides
- Species: M. chapmani

Binomial name
- Monodontides chapmani Cassidy, 2003

= Monodontides chapmani =

Species of butterfly

Monodontides chapmani is a butterfly of the family Lycaenidae. It is found on Buru in Indonesia.
