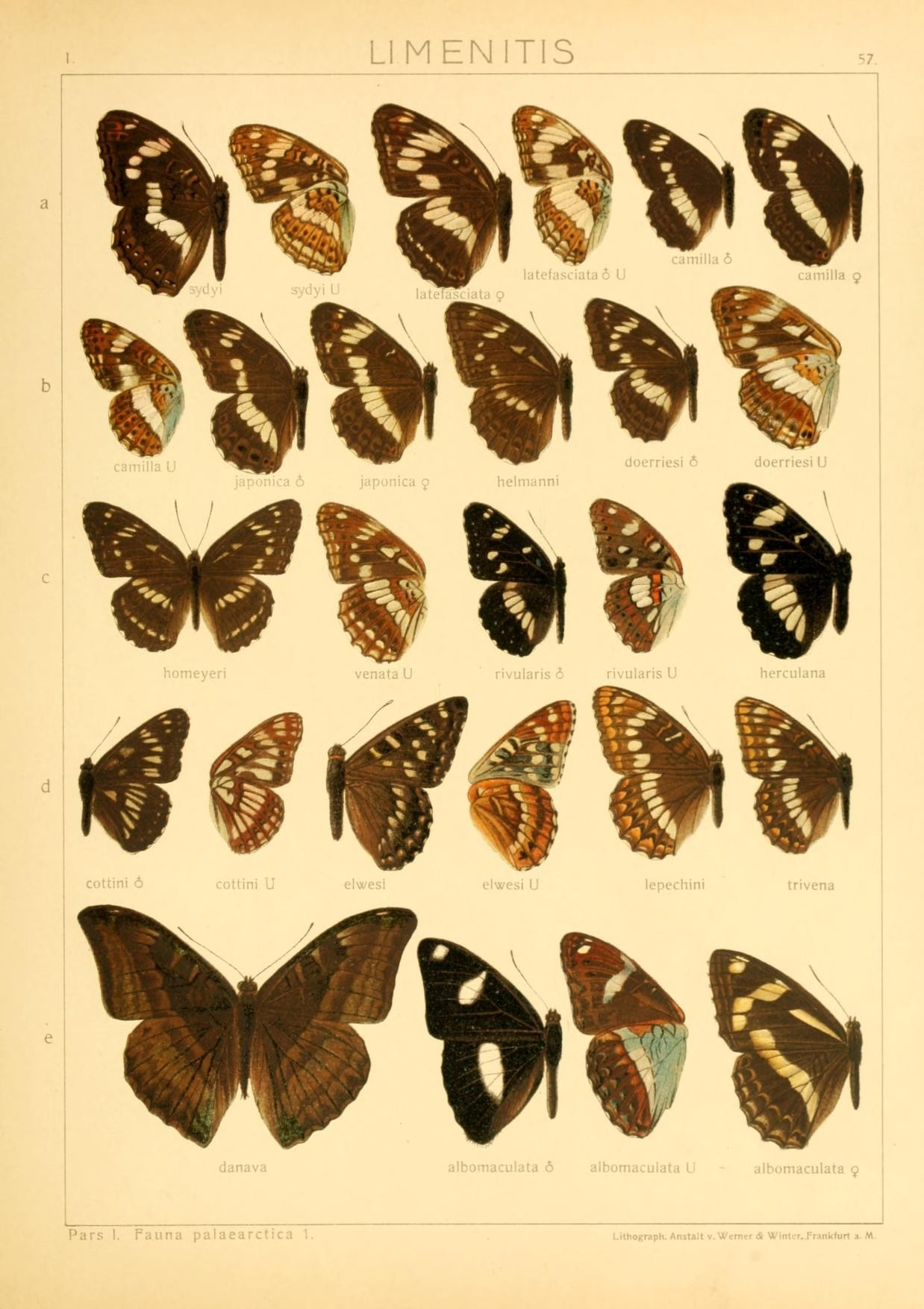
- Limenitis homeyeri in Seitz 57b

Scientific classification
- Domain: Eukaryota
- Kingdom: Animalia
- Phylum: Arthropoda
- Class: Insecta
- Order: Lepidoptera
- Family: Nymphalidae
- Genus: Limenitis
- Species: L. homeyeri

Binomial name
- Limenitis homeyeri Tancre, 1881

= Limenitis homeyeri =

Species of butterfly

Limenitis homeyeri is a butterfly found in the East Palearctic that belongs to the browns family.

== Subspecies ==
- Limenitis homeyeri homeyeri Amur
- Limenitis homeyeri venata Leech, [1892] Sichuan, Shaanxi
- Limenitis homeyeri meridionalis Hall, 1930 Yunnan
- Limenitis homeyeri sugiyamai Yoshino, 1997 North Sichuan, Shaanxi, Hubei

== Description from Seitz ==
L. homeyeri Tancre (57c) is somewhat more narrow-winged than the previous forms [sydi, camilla, helmanni, doerriesi], but very similar lo them, being more delicately marked. The middle spots of the discal row of the forewing as in doerriesi project less distally, the band of the hindwing however is anteriorly narrower and there is a row of distinct venata. small white spots in the marginal area of the hindwing. Amur, Ussuri. — venata Leech (57c) is a larger form of a darker tint, with the white markings enlarged, which is especially evident with the cell -streak of the forewing and the band of the hindwing. On the underside too the ground has a deeper colour, the markings are silky white, the band of the hindwing being sharply traversed by the black veins. South -East and West China.

== Etymology ==
The name honours Eugen Ferdinand von Homeyer.

== See also ==
- List of butterflies of Russia
