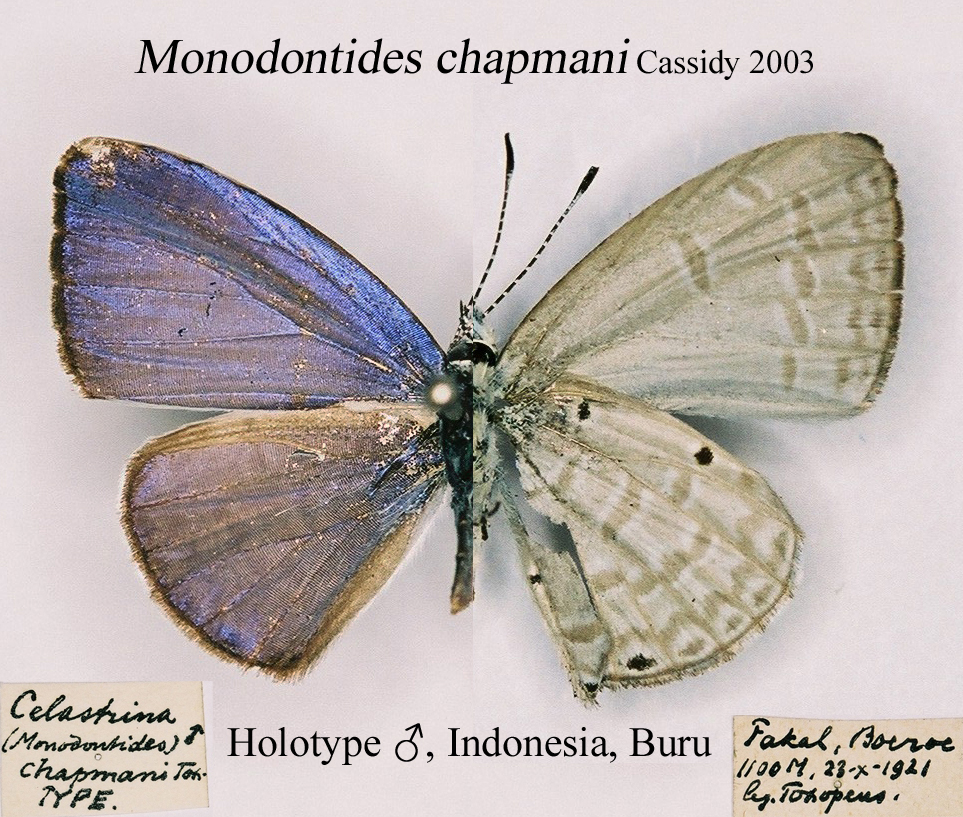
- Monodontides chapmani

Scientific classification
- Domain: Eukaryota
- Kingdom: Animalia
- Phylum: Arthropoda
- Class: Insecta
- Order: Lepidoptera
- Family: Lycaenidae
- Subfamily: Polyommatinae
- Tribe: Polyommatini
- Genus: Monodontides; Toxopeus, 1927

= Monodontides =

Butterfly genus in family Lycaenidae

Monodontides is a genus of butterflies in the family Lycaenidae. The species of this genus are found in the Indomalayan realm and the bordering Palearctic realm.

== Species ==
- Subgenus Buakraengius Eliot and Kawazoé, 1983
  - Monodontides cara (de Nicéville, 1898)
- Subgenus Monodontides Toxopeus, 1927
  - Monodontides apona (Fruhstorfer, 1910)
  - Monodontides argioloides (Rothschild, 1915)
  - Monodontides chapmani Cassidy, 2003
  - Monodontides hondai Eliot and Kawazoé, 1983
  - Monodontides kolari (Ribbe, 1926)
  - Monodontides luzonensis Eliot and Kawazoé, 1983
  - Monodontides musina (Snellen, 1892)
  - Monodontides ternatensis Eliot and Kawazoé, 1983
