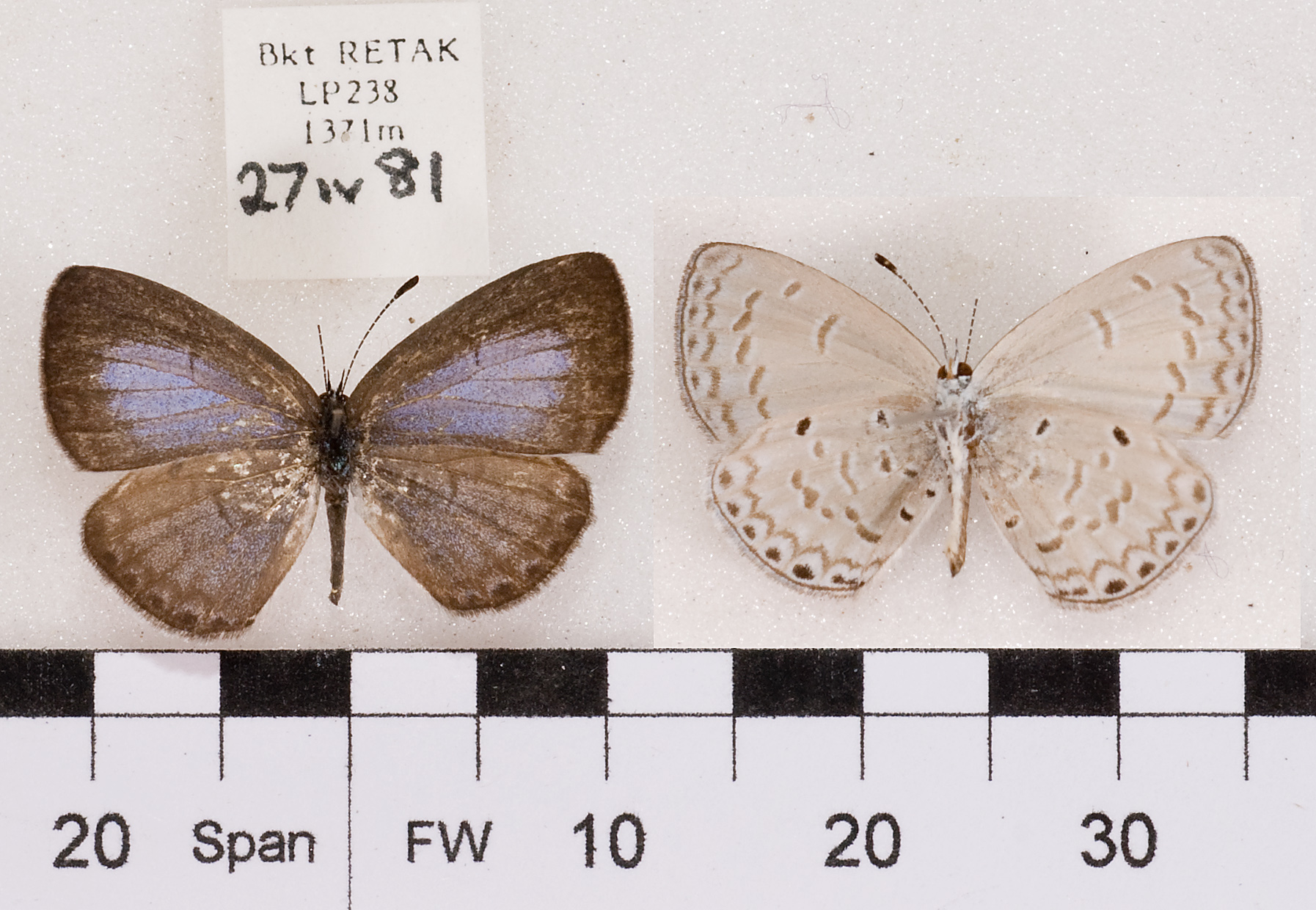

Scientific classification
- Domain: Eukaryota
- Kingdom: Animalia
- Phylum: Arthropoda
- Class: Insecta
- Order: Lepidoptera
- Family: Lycaenidae
- Genus: Monodontides
- Species: M. musina

Binomial name
- Monodontides musina (Snellen, 1892)

Synonyms
- Lycaena musina Snellen, 1892; Celastrina musina; Cyaniris candaules de Nicéville, 1895; Cyaniris lugra H. H. Druce, 1895; Lycaenopsis musinoides Swinhoe, 1910; Cyaniris parishii Rhé-Philippe, 1911; Cyaniris musina pelides Fruhstorfer, 1910

= Monodontides musina =

Species of butterfly

Monodontides musina, the Swinhoe's hedge blue, is a butterfly of the family Lycaenidae. It is found in South-East Asia, including India.

== Description ==
Male underside: pale lilacine grey. Forewing: costa bordered by a slender line, termen by a comparatively broad and even band of dusky black, the latter diffuse along its inner margin. Hindwing: costal margin diffusely dusky black, termen with a slender black anteciliary line; dorsal margin narrowly pale. Underside: white with a slight tinge of blue. Forewing: a short line on the discocellulars, a postdiscal transverse series of six abbreviated lines pointing obliquely outwards and en echelon one with the other, the uppermost shifted well inwards, followed by a subterminal series of transverse spots enclosed between an inner subterminal, lunular, transverse line and an outer anteciliary slender line, pale brown. Hindwing: a transverse subbasal series of three, sometimes four, minute spots and a spot beyond on the dorsum, with a larger subcostal spot near the apex of the wing, black; a short slender line on the discocellulars and some irregular dots on the disc pale brown; terminal markings as on the forewing. Cilia of both forewings and hindwings whitish. Antenna, head, thorax and abdomen dark brown, the antennae ringed with white beneath: the palpi, thorax and abdomen white.

Female upperside, forewing: a broad border to the costal and terminal margins dusky black, the rest of the wing iridescent light blue; on the costa the lower edge of the black traverses the middle of the cell, on the apex and termen it occupies the outer fourth of the wing. Hindwing: anterior third dusky black, the rest of the wing pale lilacine glossed with iridescent blue in certain lights; a subterminal series of dusky black spots that more or less coalesces with an anteciliary dusky black hue and is enclosed on the inner side by a slender similarly-coloured lunular line. The underside, antennae, head, thorax and abdomen as in the male.

== Taxonomy ==
The butterfly was earlier known as Lycaenopsis musina Swinhoe.

== Subspecies ==
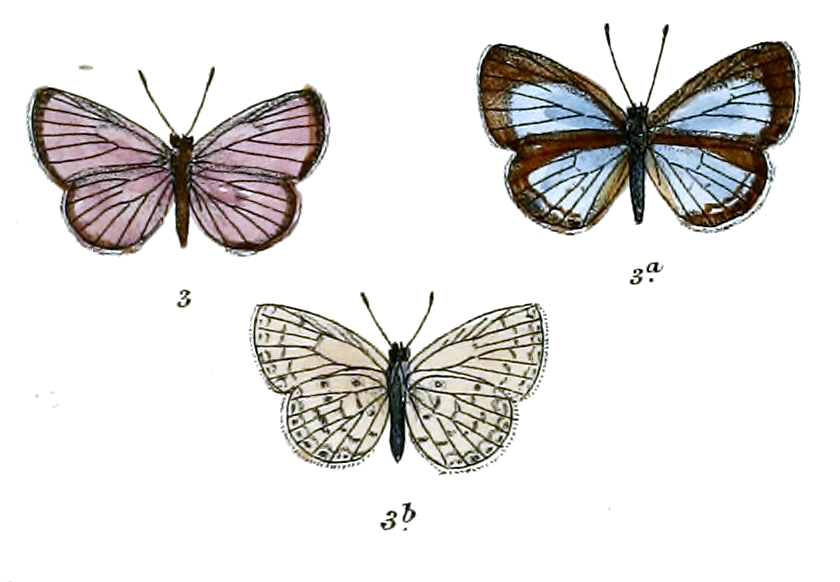
M. m. musinoides

- Monodontides musina musina (Java, Malaysia)
- Monodontides musina musinoides (Swinhoe, 1910) (north-eastern India, Burma, northern Thailand, Yunnan)
- Monodontides musina pelides (Fruhstorfer, 1910) (southern Laos, southern Vietnam)

== See also ==
- List of butterflies of India
- List of butterflies of India (Lycaenidae)
