= Monodontides apona =

Scientific classification
- Kingdom: Animalia
- Phylum: Arthropoda
- Class: Insecta
- Order: Lepidoptera
- Family: Lycaenidae
- Genus: Monodontides
- Species: M. apona

Binomial name
- Monodontides apona (Fruhstorfer, 1910)

Synonyms
- Cyaniris dilectus apona Fruhstorfer, 1910; Lycaenopsis apona; Celastrina (Udara) dilecta (?) apona (Fruhstorfer) Toxopeus, 1928

Species of butterfly

Monodontides apona is a butterfly of the family Lycaenidae. It is found on Mindanao in the Philippines.
