= Ludwig Anker =

Hungarian entomologist

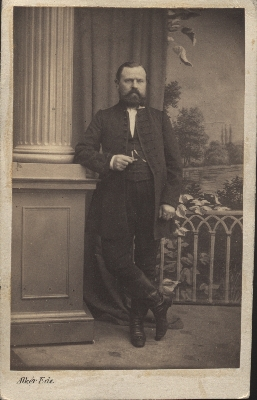
Ludwig Anker Hungarian insect dealer

Ludwig Anker (1822, Budapest – 1887) was an entomologist. He was an insect dealer.

Anker described Chondrosoma fiduciaria Anker, 1854
