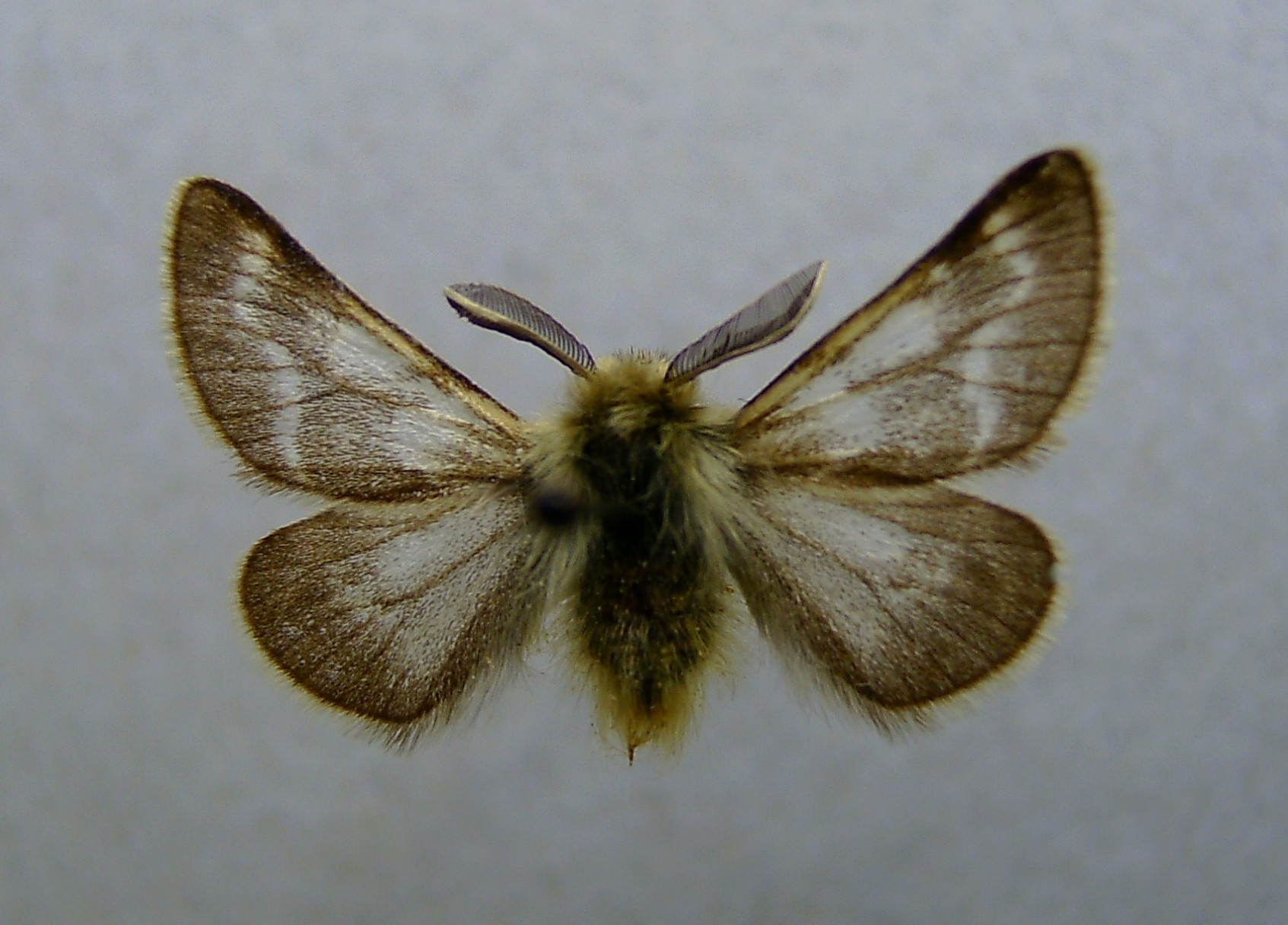

Scientific classification
- Domain: Eukaryota
- Kingdom: Animalia
- Phylum: Arthropoda
- Class: Insecta
- Order: Lepidoptera
- Family: Geometridae
- Genus: Chondrosoma; Anker, 1854
- Species: C. fiduciaria

Binomial name
- Chondrosoma fiduciaria Anker, 1854

= Chondrosoma =

Genus of moths

Chondrosoma is a monotypic moth genus in the family Geometridae erected by Ludwig Anker in 1854. Its only species, Chondrosoma fiduciaria, was described by the same author in the same year. It is found in eastern Austria, Hungary and Slovakia. It has also been recorded from the Tarbagatai region in the Khangai Mountains and Siberia.

The wingspan is 18–24 mm for males. Females are wingless. Adults are on wing from October to November.

The larvae feed on various low-growing plants, including Euphorbia and Centaurea species. Older larvae have also been recorded feeding on the leaves of Achillea asplenifolia. Pupation takes place in the soil. It overwinters as an egg.
