= Monodontides luzonensis =

Scientific classification
- Domain: Eukaryota
- Kingdom: Animalia
- Phylum: Arthropoda
- Class: Insecta
- Order: Lepidoptera
- Family: Lycaenidae
- Genus: Monodontides
- Species: M. luzonensis

Binomial name
- Monodontides luzonensis Eliot and Kawazoé, 1983

Species of butterfly

Monodontides luzonensis is a butterfly of the family Lycaenidae. It is found on Luzon in the Philippines.
