= Monodontides ternatensis =

Scientific classification
- Domain: Eukaryota
- Kingdom: Animalia
- Phylum: Arthropoda
- Class: Insecta
- Order: Lepidoptera
- Family: Lycaenidae
- Genus: Monodontides
- Species: M. ternatensis

Binomial name
- Monodontides ternatensis Eliot and Kawazoé, 1983

Species of butterfly

Monodontides ternatensis is a butterfly of the family Lycaenidae. It is found on Ternate in the Moluccas.
