= William Watkins (entomologist) =

English entomologist

William Watkins (1849–1900) was an English entomologist.

He was an insect dealer who began trading exotic butterflies in 1874 in Eastbourne. In 1879 established a natural history supplies and specimen dealership and moved to 36 The Strand, London, in partnership with Arthur Doncaster, and the dealership became Watkins & Doncaster. The partnership was dissolved after only a year but the business retained his name. In 1937 ownership passed to Frederick Metté an expert on bird eggs.
