= Monodontides argioloides =

Scientific classification
- Domain: Eukaryota
- Kingdom: Animalia
- Phylum: Arthropoda
- Class: Insecta
- Order: Lepidoptera
- Family: Lycaenidae
- Genus: Monodontides
- Species: M. argioloides

Binomial name
- Monodontides argioloides (Rothschild, 1915)

Synonyms
- Nacaduba argioloides Rothschild, 1915; Lycaenopsis argioloides (Rothschild) Fruhstorfer, 1917; Notarthrinus (Monodontides) argioloides (Rothschild) Toxopeus, 1927; Celastrina (Monodontides) argioloides (Rothschild) Toxopeus, 1928; Celastrina argrioloides

Species of butterfly

Monodontides argioloides is a butterfly of the family Lycaenidae. It is found in New Guinea.
