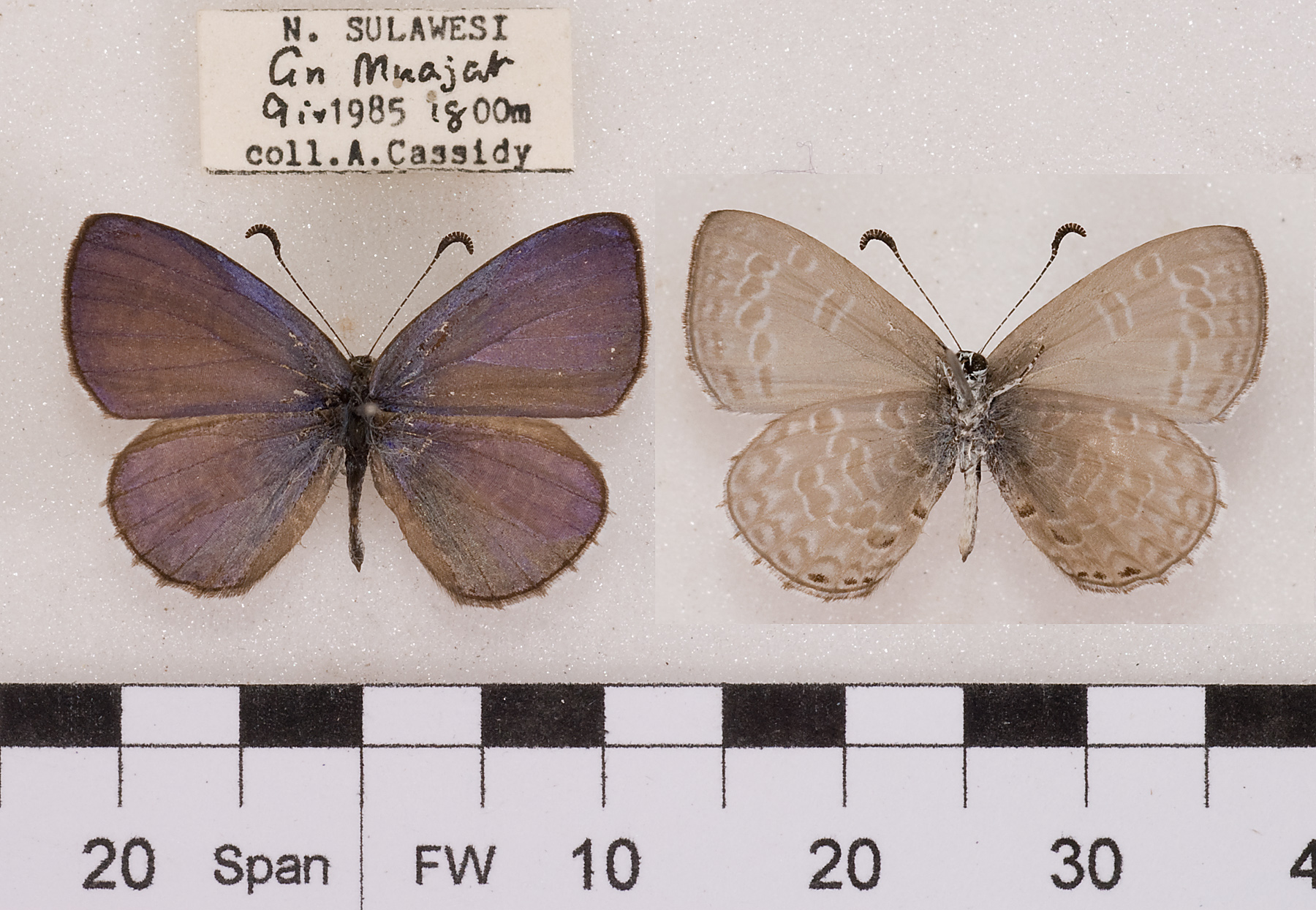

Scientific classification
- Domain: Eukaryota
- Kingdom: Animalia
- Phylum: Arthropoda
- Class: Insecta
- Order: Lepidoptera
- Family: Lycaenidae
- Genus: Monodontides
- Species: M. cara

Binomial name
- Monodontides cara (de Nicéville, 1898)

Synonyms
- Cyaniris cara de Nicéville, 1898

= Monodontides cara =

Species of butterfly

Monodontides cara is a butterfly of the family Lycaenidae. It is found on Sulawesi.
