= JFG Umlauff =

JFG Umlauff was a Hamburg-based natural history specimen and ethnographic art dealing firm and museum. It was active between 1868 and 1974.

== History ==
The firm was founded by Johann Friedrich Gustav Umlauff (1833 - 1889) in 1868. Johann was a ship's carpenter who collected and sold items he had sourced from his voyages. In 1863 he married Caroline Hagenbeck (1839–1918), the sister of Carl Hagenbeck. The firm traded from Spielbudenplatz 8–15 in Hamburg, Germany. Johann developed a network of traders, collectors, and scientists who supplied the firm with its stock of specimens and ethnographic art. The firm also supplied dioramas, models, and taxidermy services for museums and exhibitions portraying both natural history and foreign cultures. The firm grew in promenance and supplied to collectors and museums worldwide.

The firm expanded to also house a museum on the premises to feature and advertise the firm's expertise. The museum was named Umlauff'sches Weltmuseum.

After Johann's death in 1889, his widow Caroline Umlauff took over the management of the business, with assistance from her brother Carl Hagenbeck and her sons, Heinrich Christian (1869–1925), Johannes, and Theodore Umlauff. Each son developed a specialisation with Heinrich taking on the ethnographic department, Johannes the zoology department, and Theodore, the malacology (shells) department. Heinrich gained a reputation as a taxidermist, diaramist, and model maker and also created sets and props for the German film industry between 1919 and his death in 1925. Johannes left the firm in 1912 and founded the company Johannes Umlauff. Naturalien und Lehrmittel.

After Heinrich's death, his wife Bertha and his children Gustav, Thea, and Käthe Umlauff continued the company. After a family disagreement Gustav left the company and by September 1929 he was working in Carl Hoppe's business. He took over that business in October 1929 and renamed it Curiosities Umlauff.

During the second world war the majority of the ethnographic stock was destroyed by a bombing raid in 1943.

Thea, and Käthe Umlauff continued to manage the firm after their mother's death and their brother's departure. It was disestablished after Käthe's death in 1974.

== Archives ==
The business records of the firm are held at the Völkerkundemuseum Hamburg and the archive of the Museum am Rothenbaum. Kulturen und Künste der Welt, Hamburg.

== Specimens ==
The museums that hold specimens sourced from or provenanced to the J. F. G. Umlauff firm include:

- Penn Museum, Philadelphia
- Field Museum, Chicago
- British Museum, London
- Völkerkundemuseum, Hamburg
