= Monodontides hondai =

Scientific classification
- Domain: Eukaryota
- Kingdom: Animalia
- Phylum: Arthropoda
- Class: Insecta
- Order: Lepidoptera
- Family: Lycaenidae
- Genus: Monodontides
- Species: M. hondai

Binomial name
- Monodontides hondai Eliot and Kawazoé, 1983

Species of butterfly

Monodontides hondai is a butterfly of the family Lycaenidae. It is found in Palawan province of the Philippines.
