= Stevens' auction rooms =

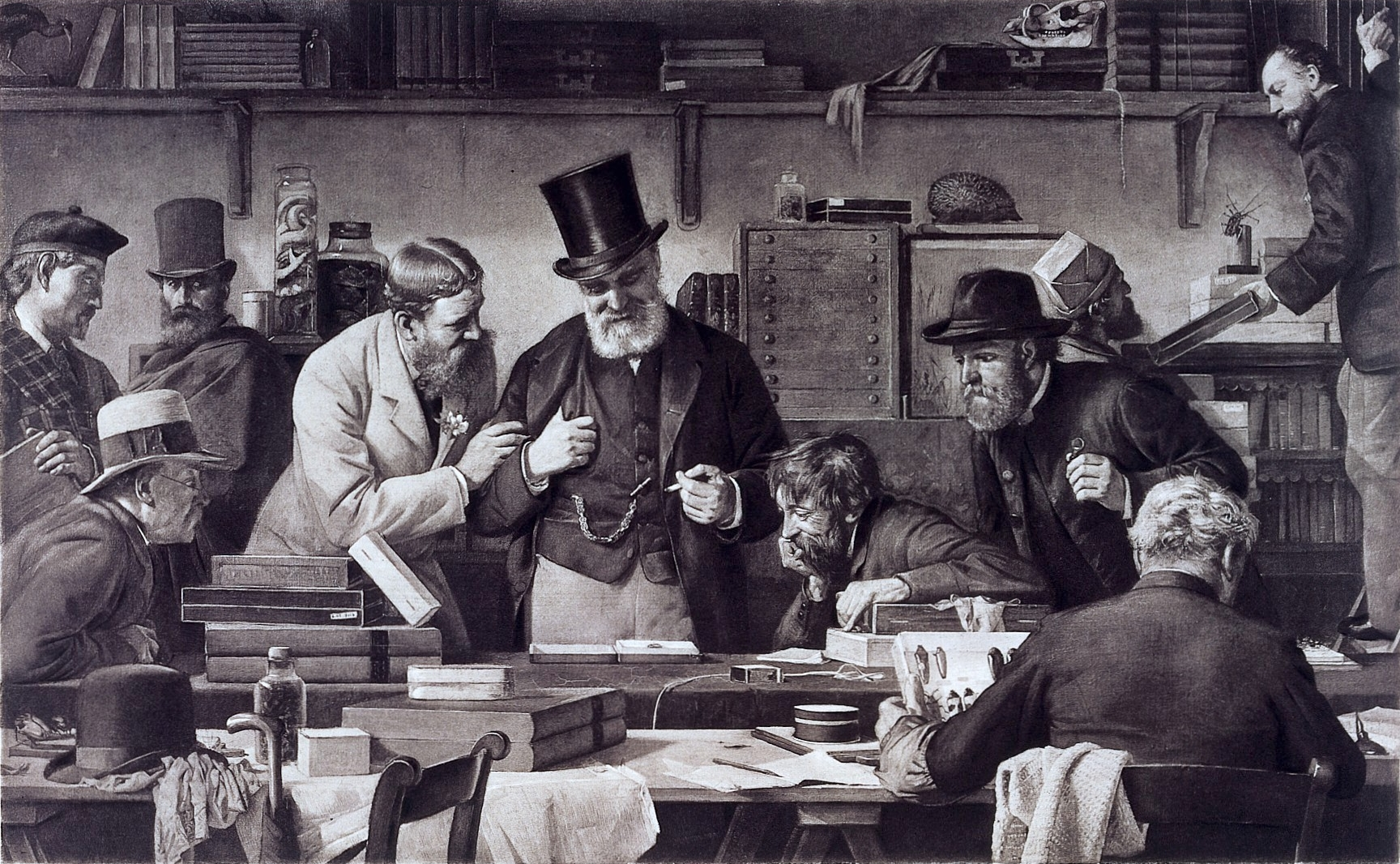
Engraving based on a painting by Edward Armitage (1817-1896) titled "After an entomological sale. Beati possidentes" depicting insect collectors F. Buchanan White, J. W. Douglas and Edward Newman admiring their purchases

Stevens' Auction Rooms was a British enterprise founded by John Crace Stevens (1809-1859) in 1831 that sold objects of 'zoological or scientific interest' including specimens of natural history and ethnography. The enterprise was located at 38 King Street, Covent Garden, London and the company was joined in by John's brother Samuel Stevens (1817-1899) as a partner in 1840 and in the 1890's it was managed by Samuel's nephew Henry Stevens who ran it until the closure of the establishment in 1939.

The origin of the company in Covent Garden was in 1759 when Samuel Paterson ran a book shop. The company later went to King, Collins and Chapman. The building served as a venue for evening entertainment for a while. It later changed hands in 1824 to Thomas of Foster Lane who was joined in 1831 by John Crace Stevens. Stevens was the son of (c.1772–1836) and Augusta Crace. He was joined by his brother Samuel Stevens (1817–1899). The first major sale was of 40000 insect specimens collected by Adrian Hardy Haworth. By 1841 Samuel was selling items that included orchids and animals from Lord Derby's menagerie. Samuel moved in 1848 and set up a natural history agency on 24, Bloomsbury Street but returned back to the auction work following the death of John. John's son Henry Stevens (1843–1925) received a license in 1863 and continued the auction business and was a noted expert on plants and molluscs, taking an interest also in photography. His sales included orchids, bird eggs, fossils, minerals, a 'bit of the Holy Cross', and shrunken human heads from various parts of the world. He would later auction the butterfly collections of his deceased uncle Samuel. Henry died of pneumonia on 11 June 1925 and the company continued to run but its sales fell before it was closed down in 1939.

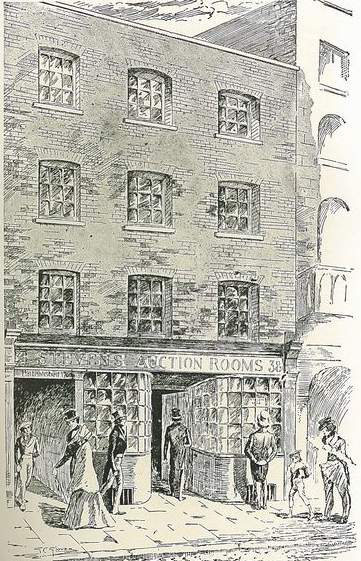
Stevens' Auction House

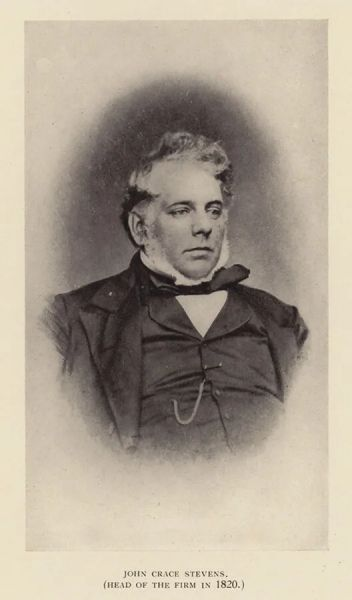
John Crace Stevens

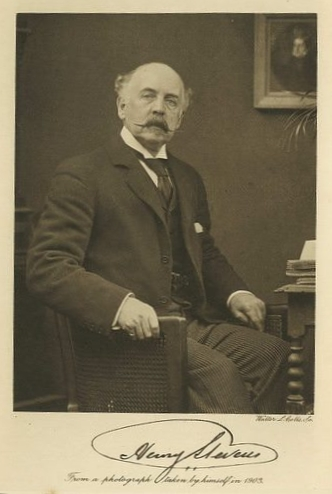
Henry Stevens

== Sources ==
- Allingham, E.G. (1924). A romance of the rostrum, being the business life of Henry Stevens … together with some account of famous sales. London: H. F. & G. Witherby.
