= Insektenbörse =

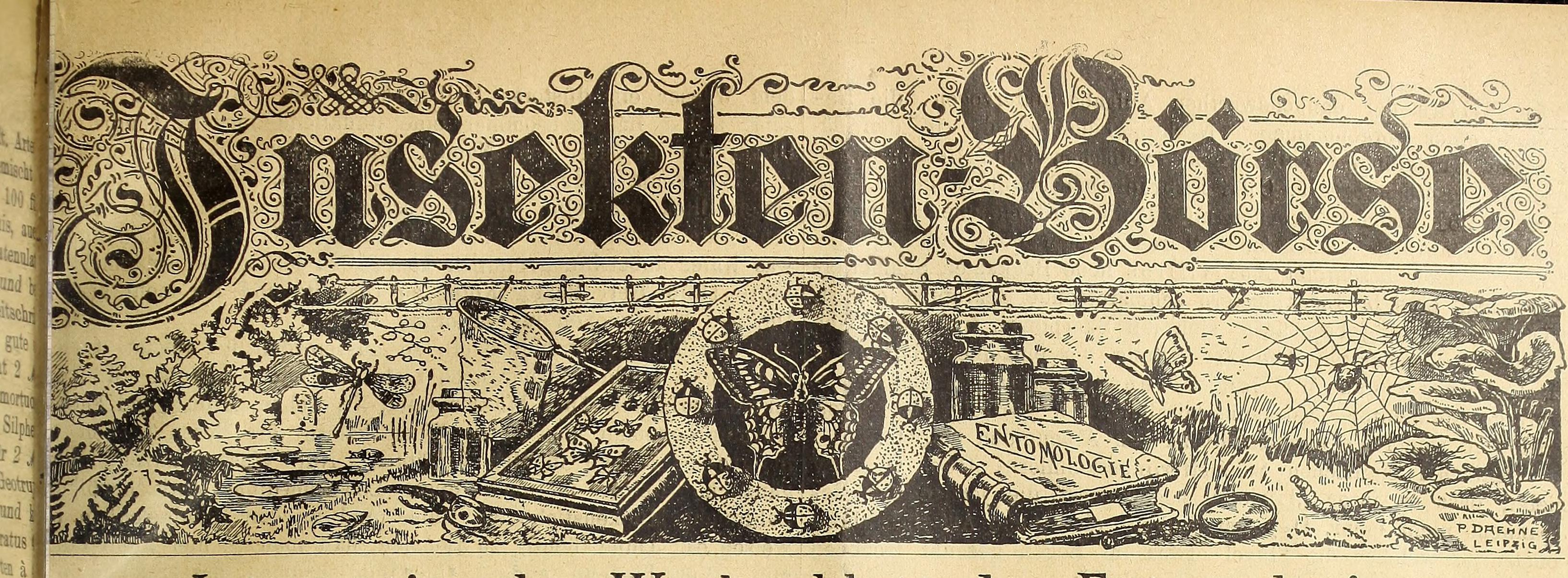
- Discipline: insect research
- Language: German

Publication details
- History: 1884–1939

Standard abbreviations
- ISO 4: Insektenbörse

Indexing
- ISSN: 0020-1839
- OCLC no.: 1606262

Insektenbörse (English: Insect Exchange) was a German entomology magazine established in 1884. It was renamed Entomologisches Wochenblatt (English: Entomology Weekly) in 1907–1908 and renamed again Entomologische Rundschau (English: Entomological Review) in 1909–1939. Beginning with volume 26 the journal was published by Alfred Kernen Verlag, Stuttgart, Germany. Insekten-Börse was also issued at various times as a trade supplement to Entomologische Zeitschrift (English: Entomological Journal).

== See also ==
- Carl Ribbe, "1900 Neue Lepidopteren aus Neu-Guinea" Insektenbörse 17 (39): 308, (42): 329-330, (44): 346

== General references ==
- Biodiversity Heritage Library – Insektenbörse – issue date: January 1914.
- More info Biodiversity Heritage Library. September 2010.
