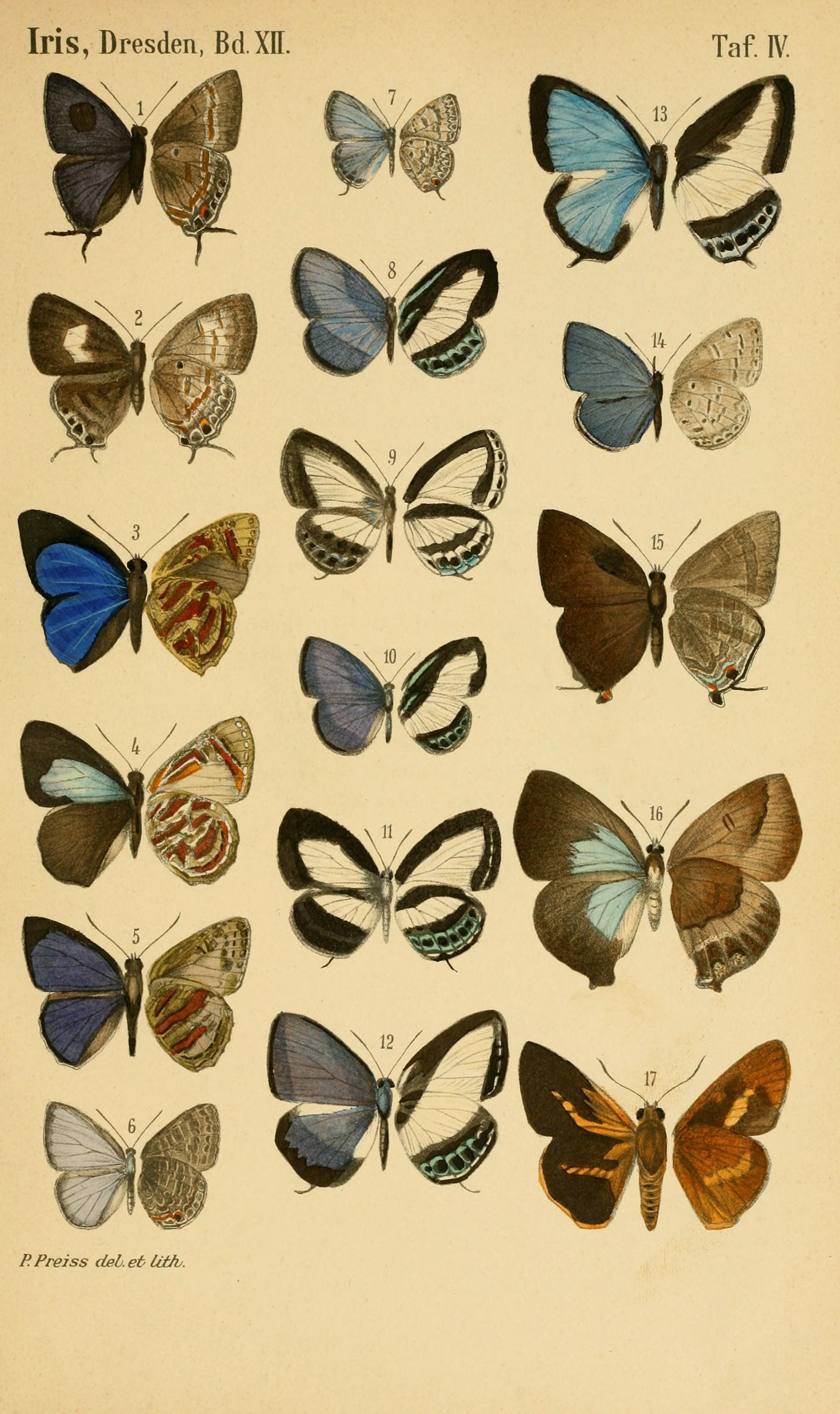
- Arhopala florinda pagenstecheri in Deutsche Entomologische Zeitschrift 1899

Scientific classification
- Kingdom: Animalia
- Phylum: Arthropoda
- Clade: Pancrustacea
- Class: Insecta
- Order: Lepidoptera
- Family: Lycaenidae
- Genus: Arhopala
- Species: A. florinda

Binomial name
- Arhopala florinda (Grose-Smith, 1896)

= Arhopala florinda =

Species of butterfly

Arhopala florinda is a species of butterfly belonging to the lycaenid family described by Henley Grose-Smith in 1896. It is found in the Australasian realm where it is endemic to the Solomon Islands.

== Description ==
Male above bright blue with a broad black margin of the wings and black veins the distal margin of the blue area in the hindwing dentate at the veins; the tail broader than in the other species.Under surface deep blackish-brown with a broad, white band with a slight brownish-grey touch, being in the hindwing of a uniform width, whilst in the forewing it begins somewhat narrower at the inner-margin and grows continually narrower anteriorly as far as vein 6. The rings at the border of the hindwing large and distinct, of a silvery blue, coherent, the black spots large; the three posterior ones smaller. Solomon Islands. — pagenstecheri Ribbe 142 h) from the Bismarck archipelago (New Pomerania) differs by a somewhat lighter blue and a narrower black margin above and by exhibiting a large white spot at the costal margin and at the base of the inner margin in the hindwing, and besides by the white band of the forewing beneath extending a little more anteriorly.

== Subspecies ==
- A. f. florinda Guadalcanal
- A. f. pagenstecheri (Ribbe, 1899) New Britain
