= Gustav Calliess =

Gustav Calliess (2 December 1871 Greifenberg in Pomerania- 1956 , Guben) was a German teacher, entomologist and insect dealer. Gustav Calliess worked as a teacher and vice principal in Guben. He worked as a beekeeper and entomologist, traded in insects at the address Sand 11, Guben, and was involved in various capacities at the Internationalen Entomologen-Bund in Guben [International Association of Entomologists in Guben]. In 1921 he took over the editorial office of the Internationalen Entomologischen Zeitschrift [International Entomological Journal], Guben, and headed it until its merger with the Entomologischen Zeitschrift at the end of 1935.

== External[ links ==
Wikisource de|Gustav Calliess

- Calliess, Gustav in Biographies of the Entomologists of the World
- ZOBODAT Gustav Calließ
