= Johann Friedrich Gustav Umlauff =

Johann Friedrich Gustav Umlauff (1833 - 1889) was a German dealer of natural history and ethnographic specimens and founder of the firm JFG Umlauff.

Johann was a ship's carpenter who collected and sold items he had sourced from his voyages. In 1863 he married Caroline Hagenbeck (1839–1918), the sister of Carl Hagenbeck from whom he learnt taxidermy. In 1868 he established the firm JFG Umlauff and traded from Spielbudenplatz 8–15 in Hamburg, Germany. Johann developed a network of traders, collectors, and scientists who supplied the firm with its stock of specimens and ethnographic art. The firm also expanded to supply dioramas, models, and taxidermy services for museums and exhibitions portraying both natural history and foreign cultures. The firm grew in promenance and supplied to collectors and museums worldwide.
