= William Eling (naturalist) =

English naturalist (c. 1790–1853)

- Born: c. 1790; Deptford, London, England
- Died: 1853; Deptford
- Other name: William Ealing
- Occupations: Naturalist natural history dealer conchologist

William Eling (c. 1790 – 1853), also written as William Ealing, was a British shipwright, naturalist and specimen dealer who specialised in shells.

== Family life ==
Eling was baptised on 20 February 1791 at St Paul's Church, Deptford. Eling's parents were John Eling, a house carpenter, and Elizabeth (nee Chambers). Eling had two brothers named Thomas and Henry, and a sister named Sophia (married name Sophia Rowley).

Aged in his early fifties on the 1841 census of England, Eling described himself as a shell merchant. In 1851 when he was 61 years old, William Eling was head of a household living with his sister's children, and he was described as a "shipwright superan'd' (= shipwright superannuated, meaning he was by then retired). William Eling is not recorded as having married, and he bequeathed his estate to his niece and nephew, Henry and Elizabeth Rowley.

== Natural History dealing ==
In William Swainson's Naturalist's Guide, published in 1822, Eling was listed as a commercial naturalist and resident at High Street, Deptford (Eling's home was at number 5 High Street).

Eling knew John Edward Gray of the British Museum and in May 1839 loaned Gray coral and "sea egg" (sea urchin) specimens for a lecture at the Greenwich Branch of the Society for Acquisition and Diffusion of Useful Knowledge, for which Eling received a vote of thanks at the end of the evening. During the 1840s the British Museum's registers show a series of regular purchases of marine specimens from Eling (these specimens are now in the collection of the Natural History Museum, London): e.g. specimens collected from the HMS Sulphur, and corals.

The shell collector Abraham Lincolne of Islington (d. 1849), whose collection was donated to the Royal Museum in Salford, also purchased specimens from Eling.

== A note about the spelling of Eling's name ==
In the second edition of William Swainson's Naturalist's Guide, Eling's last name is given as Ealing and his address as given as Butt Lane, Deptford: Eling had not actually changed address – Butt Lane was renamed in about 1825 and became Deptford High Street. It is not known who submitted the correction to Swainson and it is not certain how Eling preferred to spell his own name, as the alternate spellings Eling and Ealing can both be found in the historical record. This wiki biography uses "Eling" as it is the version of his last name which appears in more official sources (e.g. the England Census returns of 1841 and 1851, and his will).
