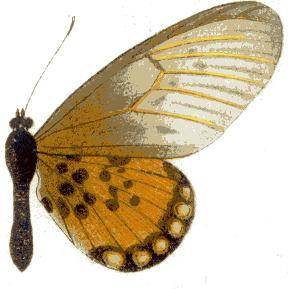
- Female
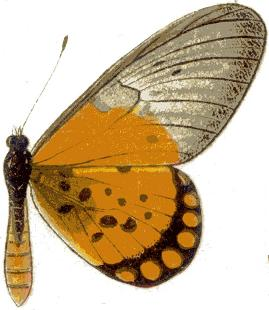
- Male

Scientific classification
- Kingdom: Animalia
- Phylum: Arthropoda
- Class: Insecta
- Order: Lepidoptera
- Family: Nymphalidae
- Genus: Acraea
- Species: A. admatha

Binomial name
- Acraea admatha Hewitson, 1865 London.

Synonyms
- Acraea (Acraea) admatha; Acraea admatha ab. mildbraedi Schultze, 1917

= Acraea admatha =

Species of butterfly

Acraea admatha, the Hewitson's glassy acraea, is a butterfly in the family Nymphalidae. It is found in southern Nigeria, Cameroon, Equatorial Guinea, Gabon, the Republic of the Congo, northern Angola and the western part of the Democratic Republic of the Congo.

== Description ==
A. admatha Hew. (53 e). Forewing as far as vein 2 or 3 rose-coloured or brick-red, then smoky and transparent, discal dots 1 b to 5 and a dot in the cell usually more or less distinct, but never sharply prominent; hindwing above with red ground-colour and sharply prominent basal and discal dots and broad black marginal band with large red marginal spots; beneath marked as above but with light, reddish white ground-colour. In the female, the red parts of the male are dirty yellowish-grey or grey-brown. Sierra Leone to Natal and British East Africa.

== Biology ==
The habitat consists of forest edges, secondary forests and agricultural areas with a full canopy.

The larvae feed on Rinorea species.

== Taxonomy ==
It is a member of the Acraea terpsicore species group - but see also Pierre & Bernaud, 2014
