= Gustav Schrader =

German ornithologist

Gustav Schrader (1852, Missolonghi, Greece – 1942 Alexandria, Egypt) was an ornithologist.

Gustav Schrader, the son of a taxidermist was a bird collector and natural history dealer in Port Said. He collected in Egypt, Asia Minor, Ethiopia and Somaliland. Schrader supplied the Halle Saale dealer Wilhelm Schlüter and the Tring ornithologist Walter Rothschild with large series of scientific bird skins.
