= Walter Freeman Webb =

American biologist

Walter Freeman Webb (1869 – 1957) was an American ornithologist, conchologist and shell dealer.

Webb was born on a farm in the Mid-west of the United States on May 28, 1869. At age 13 he began collecting and selling bird's eggs. He first worked as a stenographer, then a nurseryman, then he became a natural history dealer in Albion, NY following a successful commercial exhibit at World's Columbian Exposition in Chicago. From 1894-1905 he published the magazine The Museum: "A journal devoted to research in natural science". He bought and sold several important shell collections. In 1946 he moved to St. Petersburg, Florida where he continued his shell and coin business.

Webb sold over 20,000 eggs and 10,000 bird skins between 1883 and 1903. In 1930 he was America's largest shell dealer, having about 25,000 species in stock.

He died in June 1957, in St. Petersburg, Florida.

== Works ==
- Ornithologists' and oologists' manual: consisting of a complete list of all North American birds, with prices of their eggs and skins, also an exhaustive line of ornithogists', oologists', and taxidermists' supplies, valuable information for the amateur, recipes etc (1895)
- United States Mollusca: a descriptive manual of many of the marine, land and fresh water shells of North America, north of Mexico. All species covered in the book are fully illustrated Rochester, N. Y. (1942)
- Handbook for shell collectors: illustrations and descriptions of (over 2000) marine species foreign to the United States of America Wellesley Hills, Mass., Lee (1935, 1948, revised 15th edition 1960)
