= Samuel Stevens (naturalist) =

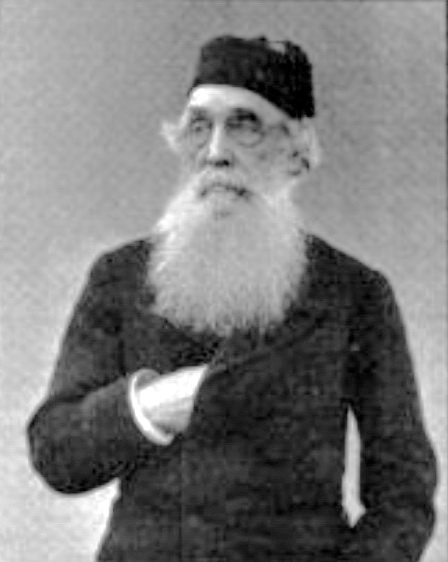
Stevens towards the end of his life

Samuel Stevens (11 March 1817 – 29 August 1899) was an entomological collector and a natural history agent in London. He was one of the founding members of the Entomological Society of London. He sold specimens from collectors that he sponsored including Alfred Russel Wallace and Henry Walter Bates.

== Life and work ==
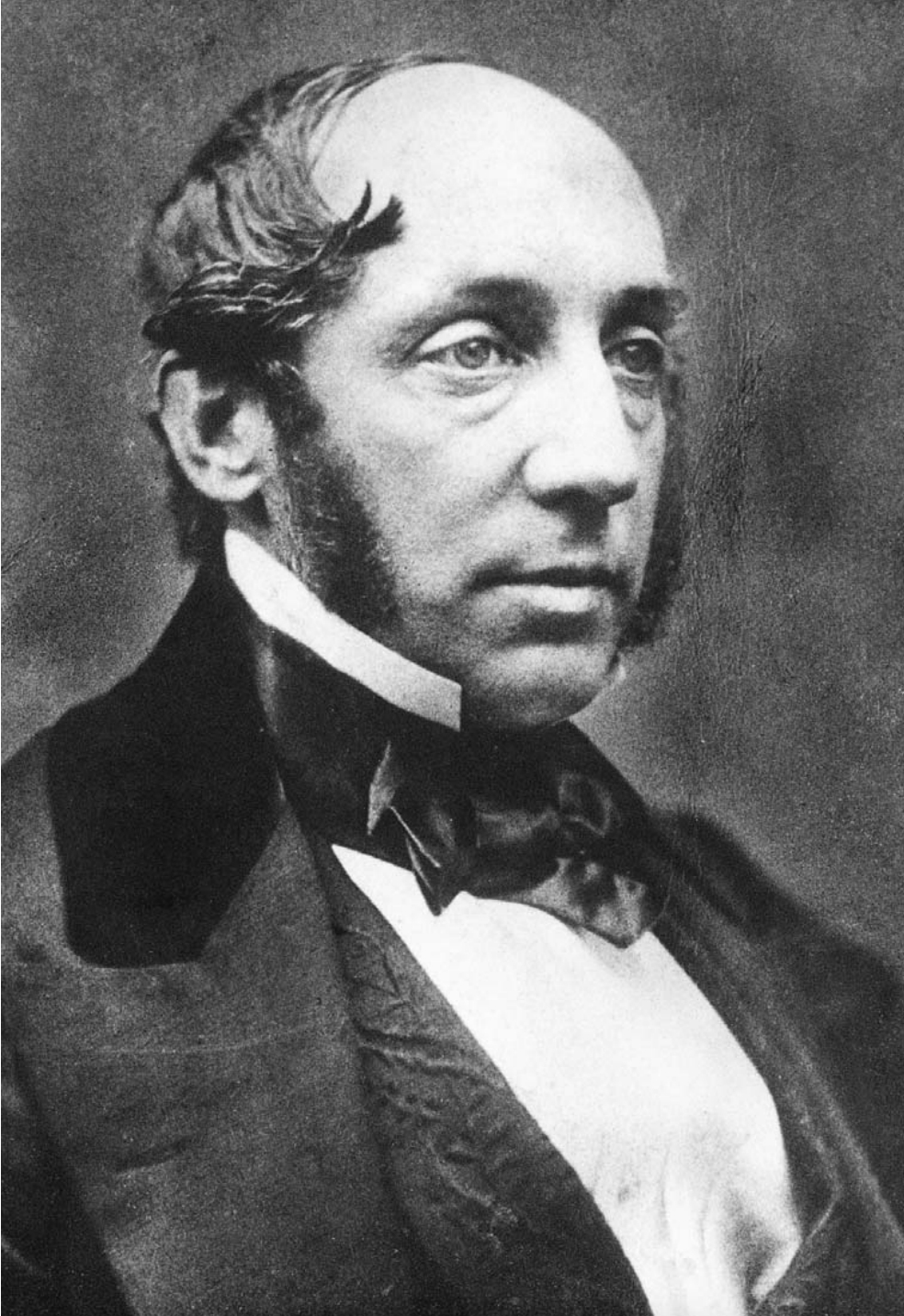
Stevens in younger days

Stevens was born in Kennington to John (c.1772–1836) and Augusta Crace. With a father interested in arts Samuel also sought to train as an artist. He received a medal from the Royal Society of Arts for some pencil sketches at the age of thirteen but illness prevented him from pursuing art. He partnered with his brother John Crace Stevens (1809-1859) from 1840 in Stevens' Auction Rooms on 38, King Street. The auction house, known as Covent Garden auction house founded in 1760 was joined in by John Crace as a partner in 1831 and the company name was changed to J.C. Stevens' in 1834. Both the Stevens brothers was a keen entomological collectors for much of their life but were not very scientifically inclined. Samuel left the auction company in 1848 and started his own natural history agency from his shop at 24 Bloomsbury Street, London which ran until 1867 when he sold it to Edmond Thomas Higgins. He briefly managed the auction company after the death of his brother in 1859 until his nephews could take over. Stevens was an agent who sponsored specimen collection and two of his best known collectors were Alfred Russel Wallace and Henry Walter Bates. He supported their joint collecting expedition to the Amazon and then Wallace's journeys in the Malay Archipelago by buying their specimens, displaying them to learned societies and selling them to collectors. Their sales included the collections of 40000 insects made by Adrian Hardy Haworth, orchids, and the menagerie of Lord Derby. also supported the botanical collector Robert William Plant (1818-1858). For many years, Stevens lived with his mother Augusta, who died in 1868. Stevens married late in life to Francis Wood in 1874. After 1876 he retired to live at Loanda, Beulah Hill, Upper Norwood taking an interest in his insect collections, fishing, and water-colour painting. After his death, his collections were sold off in auctions by his nephew J.S. Stevens.

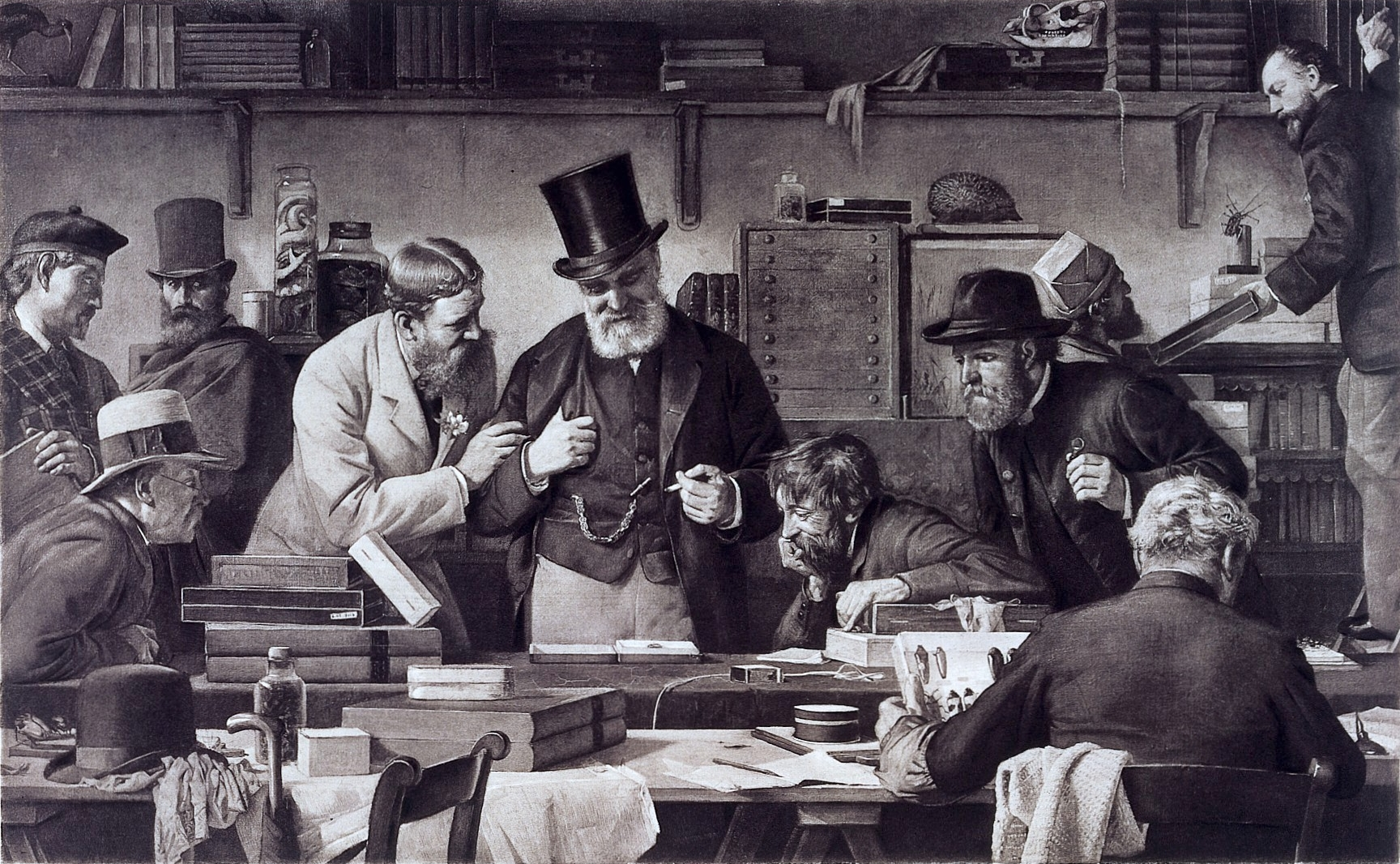
J. C. Stevens Auction Room depicted in a painting by Edward Armitage (1878)

Stevens was a member of the Linnean Society from 1850. Stevens is remembered in the specific name of the Jamaican snail, Petitia stevensiana (now Fadyenia stevensiana), named by Edward Chitty in 1857 “in compliment to the naturalist’s universal friend, S. Stevens, Esq., Bloomsbury Street, London.”
