= Markus Ribbe =

American microbiologist and biochemist

Markus W. Ribbe is an American microbiologist and biochemist, focusing in chemical biology and inorganic and organometallic, currently at University of California, Irvine, also holding the Chancellor's Professorship, and an Elected Fellow of the American Association for the Advancement of Science and American Academy of Microbiology.
