= Heinrich Michael Neustetter =

Heinrich Michael Neustetter (14 June 1874, Vienna – 13 February 1958 Offenhausen) was an Austrian entomologist who specialised in Lepidoptera. He was an insect specimen dealer. His collection is held by Naturhistorisches Museum, Vienna.

== Works ==
Africa

- Neustetter, H. (1912): Neue oder wenig bekannte Cymothoe Arten. Deutsche Entomologische Zeitschrift, Iris 26: 167-185.
- Neustetter, H. (1916): Neue und wenig bekannte afrikanische Rhopaloceren. Deutsche Entomologische Zeitschrift, Iris 30: 95-108.
- Neustetter, H. (1921): Besprechung wenig bekannter afrikanischer Nymphalidae. Zeitschrift des Osterreichischen Entomologen-Vereins, Wien 6: 27, 34, 41-42, 47-48.
- Neustetter, H. Verzeichnis der von Herrn Rudolf Oldenburg in Kamerun gesammelten Schmetterlinge. Zeitschrift des Osterreichischen Entomologen-Vereins, Wien 11: 106-108.
- Neustetter, H. (1927a): Neue afrikanische Tagfalter. Internationale Entomologische Zeitschrift 21: 7-8, 14-16, 23-24, 32.
- Neustetter, H. (1927b): Verzeichnis de von Herrn Rudolf Oldenburg in Kamerun versammelten Schmetterlinge. Zeitschrift des Osterreichischen Entomologen-Vereins, Wien 12: 60-62.
- Neustetter, H. (1928) Eine neue afrikanische Nymphalide. Internationale Entomologische Zeitschrift 21: 445-446.
- Neustetter, H. (1929a): Neue exotische Tagfalter. Internationale Entomologische Zeitschrift 22: 389-392.
- Neustetter, H. (1929b): Eine neue Catopsilia von Madagascar. Internationale Entomologische Zeitschrift 23: 336-337.
- Neustetter, H. (1929c): Eine neue afrikanische Pieriden-Gattung. Internationale Entomologische Zeitschrift 23: 191-192.
