= Wilhelm Schlüter =

German natural history dealer

Wilhelm Schlüter (1828 – 25 April 1919) was a German natural history dealer.

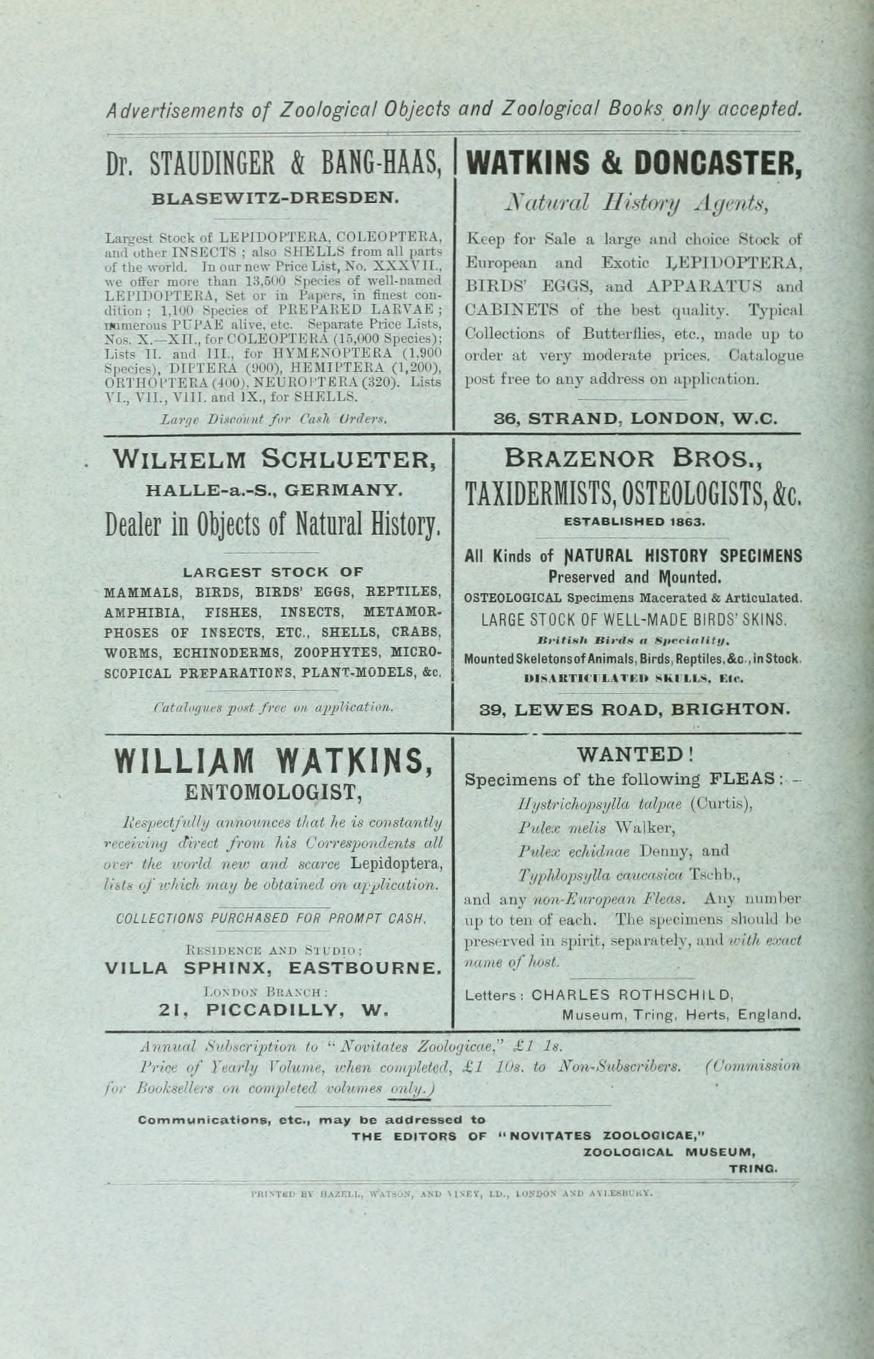
Advertisement in Novitates Zoologicae Volume 2 1896

Wilhelm Schlüter was the proprietor of das Naturwissenschaftliche Institut - Naturalien und Lehrmittelhandlung in Halle an der Saale. He sold many important bird and insect collections to museums and private collections. He also supplied specimens, equipment and books to universities. He was associated with the ornithologists Otto Kleinschmidt, Oscar Rudolph Neumann and August Carl Eduard Baldamus and sold bird specimens collected by Herbert and Bruno Geisler in New Guinea, by Gustav Schrader in the Near East and by Carl Constantin Platen in China and South East Asia.

A subspecies of lizard, Ophisops elegans schlueteri, is named in his honor. An African ant Polyrhachis schlueteri is also named for him.
