= Heinrich Ribbe =

German entomologist

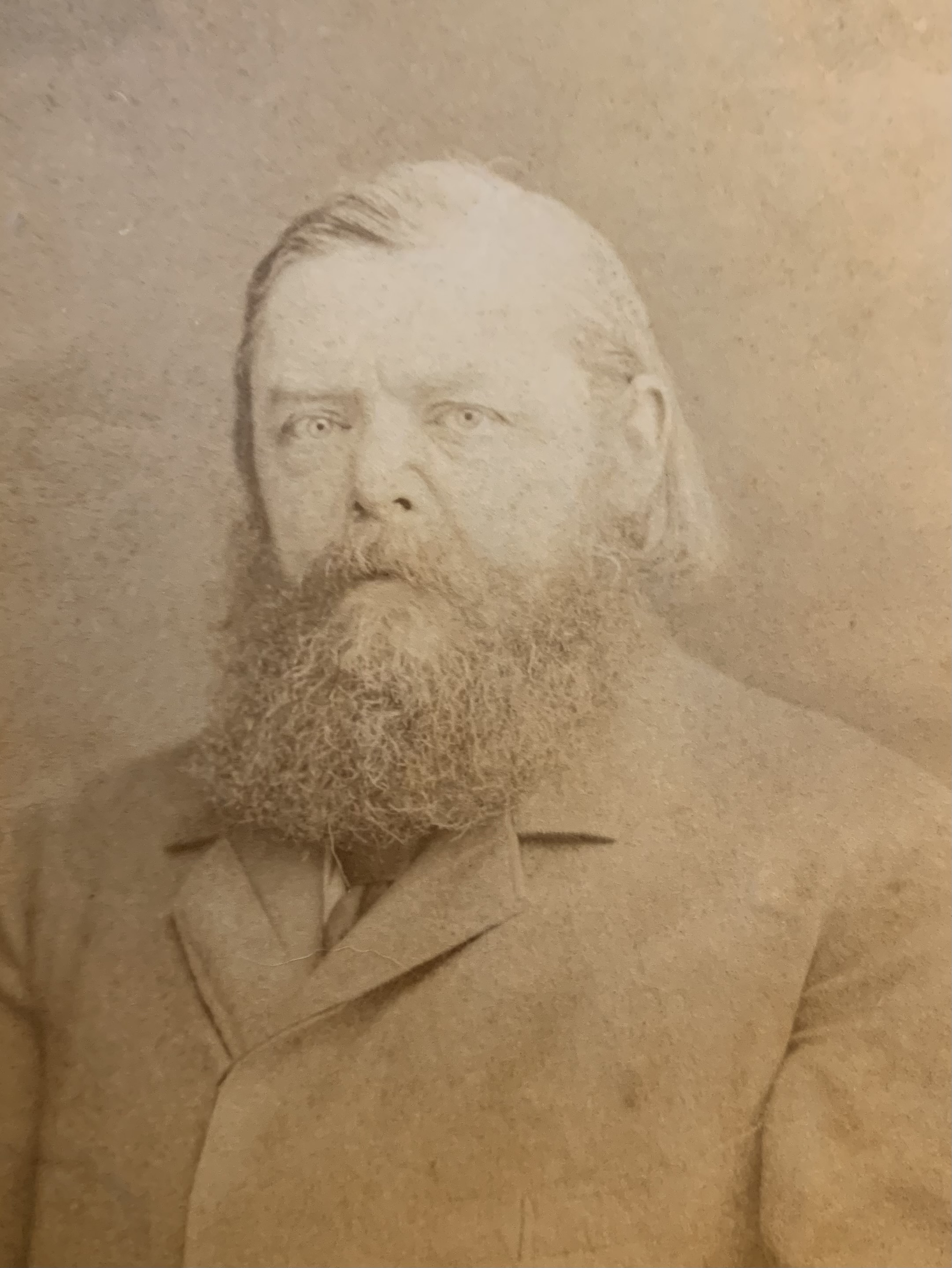

August Theodor Heinrich Ribbe (June 13, 1832 Berlin - January 19, 1898) was a German entomologist.

Heinrich Ribbe was an insect dealer in Dresden and Berlin. In 1876 he collected trade insects in the Crimea and in 1878 he collected for Otto Staudinger and Andreas Bang-Haas in Panama and Chiriqui. His private collection is in the State Museum of Zoology, Dresden. His entomologist interest and profession was passed to his son Carl Ribbe.
