= Carl Ribbe =

German explorer and entomologist (1860-1934)

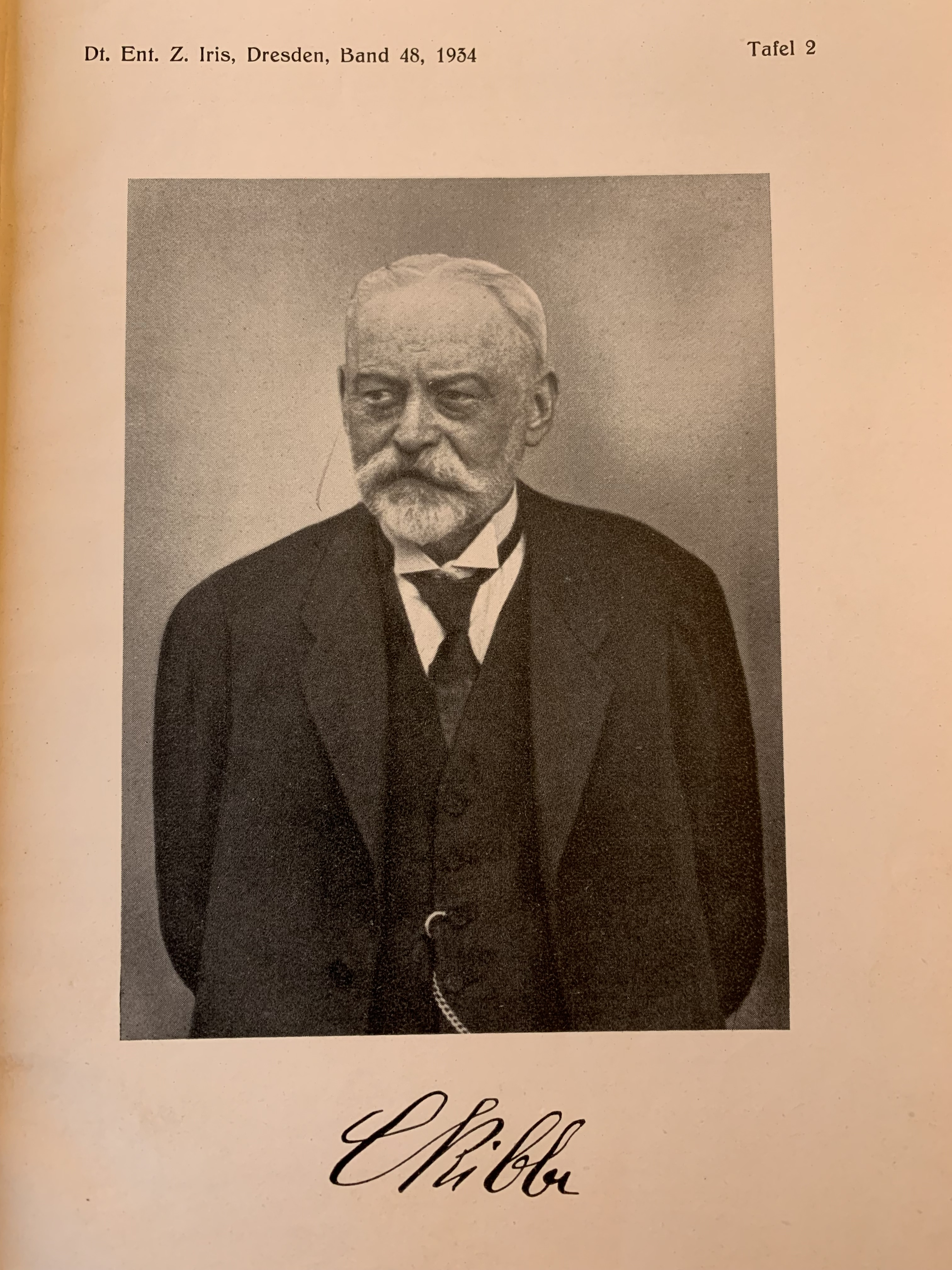

Carl Heinrich Michael Ribbe (November 16, 1860, Berlin - August 27, 1934, Radebeul Dresden) was a German explorer and entomologist.

Carl Ribbe was an insect dealer in Berlin. He travelled widely in the South Seas, exploring Celebes, the Aru Islands, Ceram, Amboina, Key Island, Wumba-Inseln, the Bismarck Archipelago, Solomon Islands, Shortland Island and "New Pomerania" (New Guinea). He also collected in Andalusia and Southern Spain. His private collection of Lycaenidae is in the Natural History Museum in Dresden. Ribbe described many new species of butterflies, including Graphium weiskei. He also collected and sold ethnographic material de:Ethnologisches Museum and published an ethnographical travelogue of his time in Solomon Islands. Carl followed the profession of his father, also entomologist, Heinrich Ribbe.

== Journal articles ==
partial list

- Ribbe, C., 1894. Reise nach Bougainville. Globus 66:133-136
- Ribbe, C., 1899. Beiträge zur Lepidopteran-Fauna des Bismarck- und Salomo-Archipels in Süd-See. Deutsche Entomologische Zeitschrift herausgegeben von der Gesellschaft Iris zu Dresden 12: 219-260
- Ribbe, C., 1900. Neue Lepidopteren aus Neu-Guinea Insekten-Börse 17 (39): 308, (42): 329–330, (44): 346
- Ribbe, C., 1900. Neue Lepidopteren aus der Süd-See und einige Bemerkungen. Deutsche Entomologische Zeitschrift herausgegeben von der Gesellschaft Iris zu Dresden 12 (2): 407–409.
- Ribbe, C., 1900. Zwei Jahre auf den Salomoninseln. Verein fur Erdkunde zu Metz, Jahresbericht 22:84-104.
- Ribbe, C., 1901. Neue Lepidopteren von Ceram. Niederlandisch-Ostindien. Deut. ent. Zeit. [Iris] 13: 334-337 1 pl.
- Ribbe, C., 1904. Die Entdeckungsgeschichte der Salomons-Inseln und uber die fruheren und jetzigen Bewonhner dieser Inseln. Gesellschaft fur Erdkunde zu Berlin, Zeitschrift: 241.
- Ribbe, C., 1907. Zwei neue Papilioformen von der Salomo-Insel Bougainville. Deut. ent. Zeit. [Iris] 20: 59–63, pls 4,5.
- Ribbe, C., 1914. Die Salomons-inseln und ihre Bewohner. Kolonie und Heimat 36: 4.
- Ribbe, C., 1926. Neue Lycaenenformen hauptsächlich von Celebes. Ent. Mitt. 15: 78–91.

== Books ==
- Zwei Jahre unter den Kannibalen der Salomo-Inseln: Reiseerlebnisse und Schilderungen von Land und Leuten. Dresden-Blasewitz: Elbgau-Buchdruckerei, Hermann Beyer, 1903.
- Ein Sammelaufenthalt in Neu-Lauenburg (Duke of York im Bismarckarchipel). Dresden: Buchdruckerei der Wilhelm und Bertha v. Baensch Stiftung, 1910–1912.
- Unter dem südlichen Kreuz: Reisebilder aus Melanesien. Dresden: Deutsche Buchwerkstätten, 1924.
- Anleitung zum sammeln in tropischen Ländern. Stuttgart, A. Kernen, 1931.
