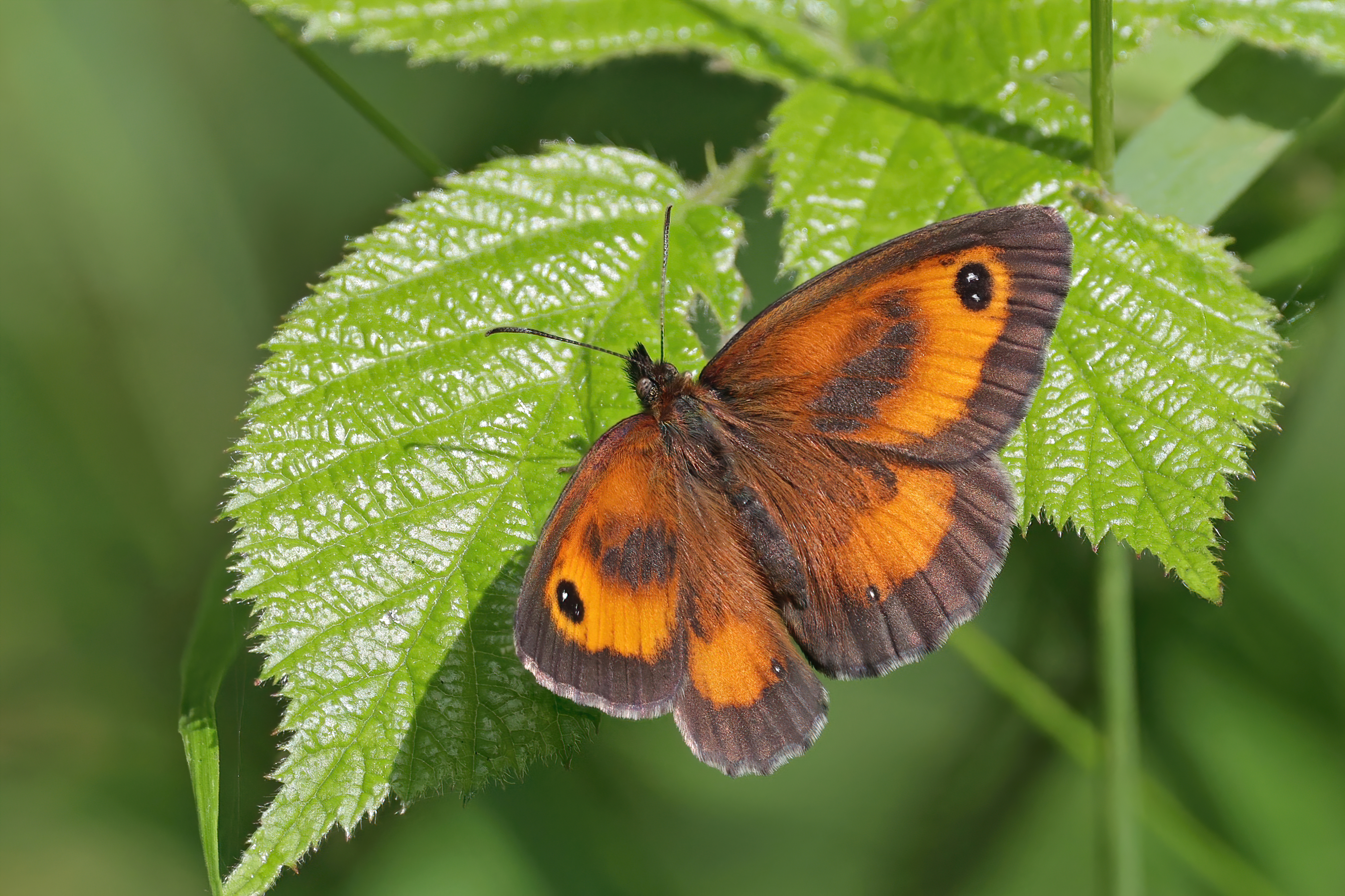
- Male
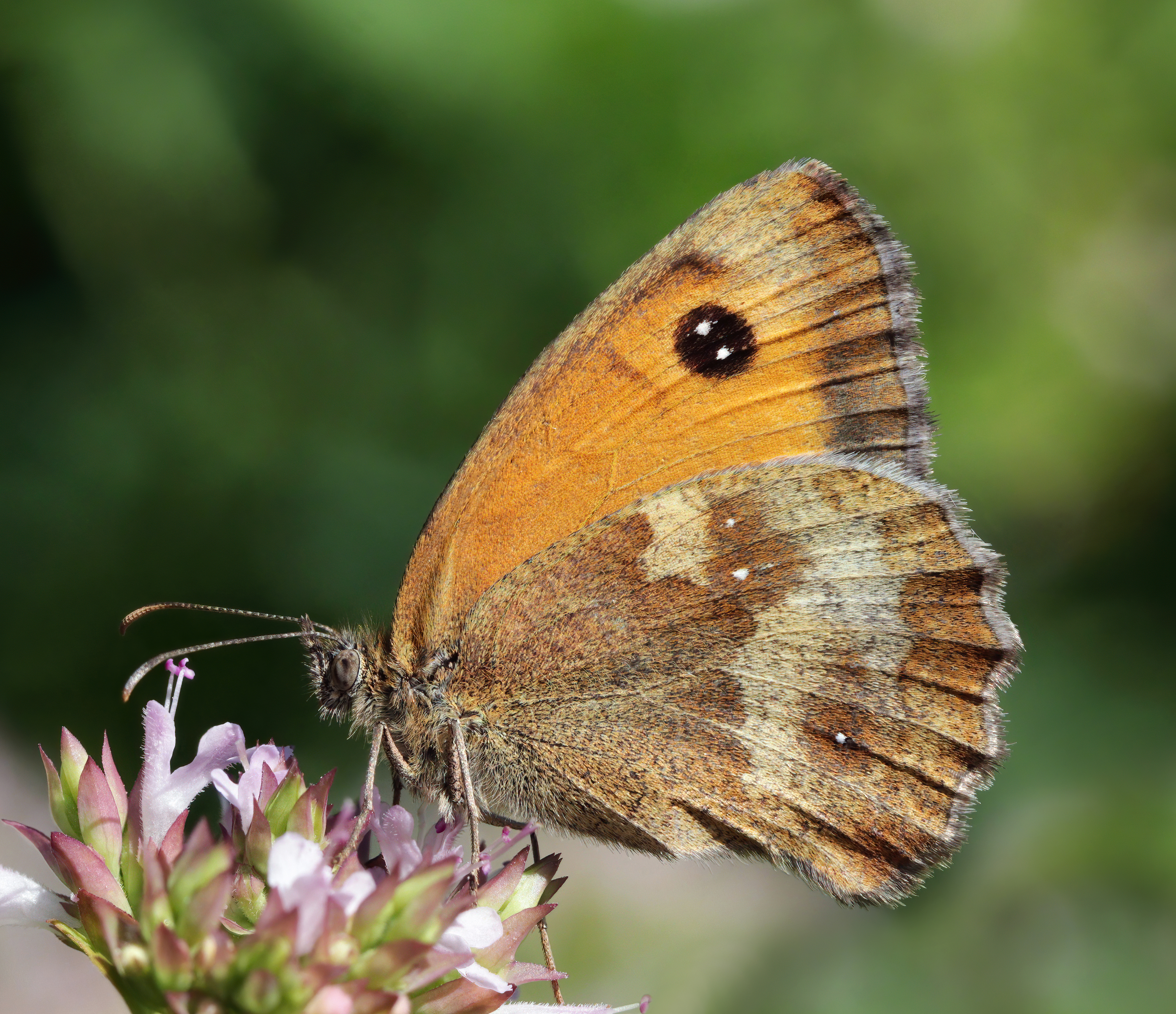
- Both in Oxfordshire, England

Conservation status
- Least Concern (IUCN 3.1)

Scientific classification
- Kingdom: Animalia
- Phylum: Arthropoda
- Clade: Pancrustacea
- Class: Insecta
- Order: Lepidoptera
- Family: Nymphalidae
- Genus: Pyronia
- Species: P. tithonus

Binomial name
- Pyronia tithonus (Linnaeus, 1758)

= Gatekeeper (butterfly) =

Species of butterfly

The gatekeeper or hedge brown (Pyronia tithonus) is a species of butterfly found across Europe. Given its preference for warmer weather, the restriction of range expansion can be assumed to be due to climate. Colonies vary in size depending on the available habitat, and can range from a few dozen to several thousand butterflies. Named for its rigorous patrol of hedges and woodland rides, the gatekeeper butterfly is a prime pollinator. The caterpillars primarily feed on fine grasses such as fescues (Festuca) and bents (Agrostis), which are common in meadows and roadside verges.

== Similar species and subspecies ==
It is a member of the subfamily Satyrinae in the family Nymphalidae. A similar species is the meadow brown; the two species can be difficult to distinguish with closed wings, since the underwing markings are very similar. However, the gatekeeper tends to rest with its wings open, whereas the meadow brown usually rests with its wings closed. The gatekeeper is also smaller and more orange than the meadow brown and has double pupils on its eyespots.

Two other similar species of Pyronia are found in southern Europe, the southern gatekeeper (P. cecilia) and the Spanish gatekeeper (P. bathsheba).

P. tithonus has two known subspecies. P. t. ssp. britanniae, defined by Ruggero Verity in 1915, is represented in the British Isles. P. t. ssp. tithonus, defined by Carl Linnaeus in 1771, is not found in the British Isles. Instead, this subspecies is seen in central and southern Europe except southern Italy and in the Mediterranean islands except for southern Corsica and Sardinia.

== Physical appearance ==
The gatekeeper is orange with two large brown spots on its wings and a brown pattern on the edge of its wings. The eyespots on the fore wings most likely reduce or deflect bird attacks, which would explain why the gatekeeper is often seen resting with its wings open. A large number of aberrant forms are known, such as excessa, where specimens have two to four extra spots on the fore wing upperside. The number of spots on the hind wing underside also varies.

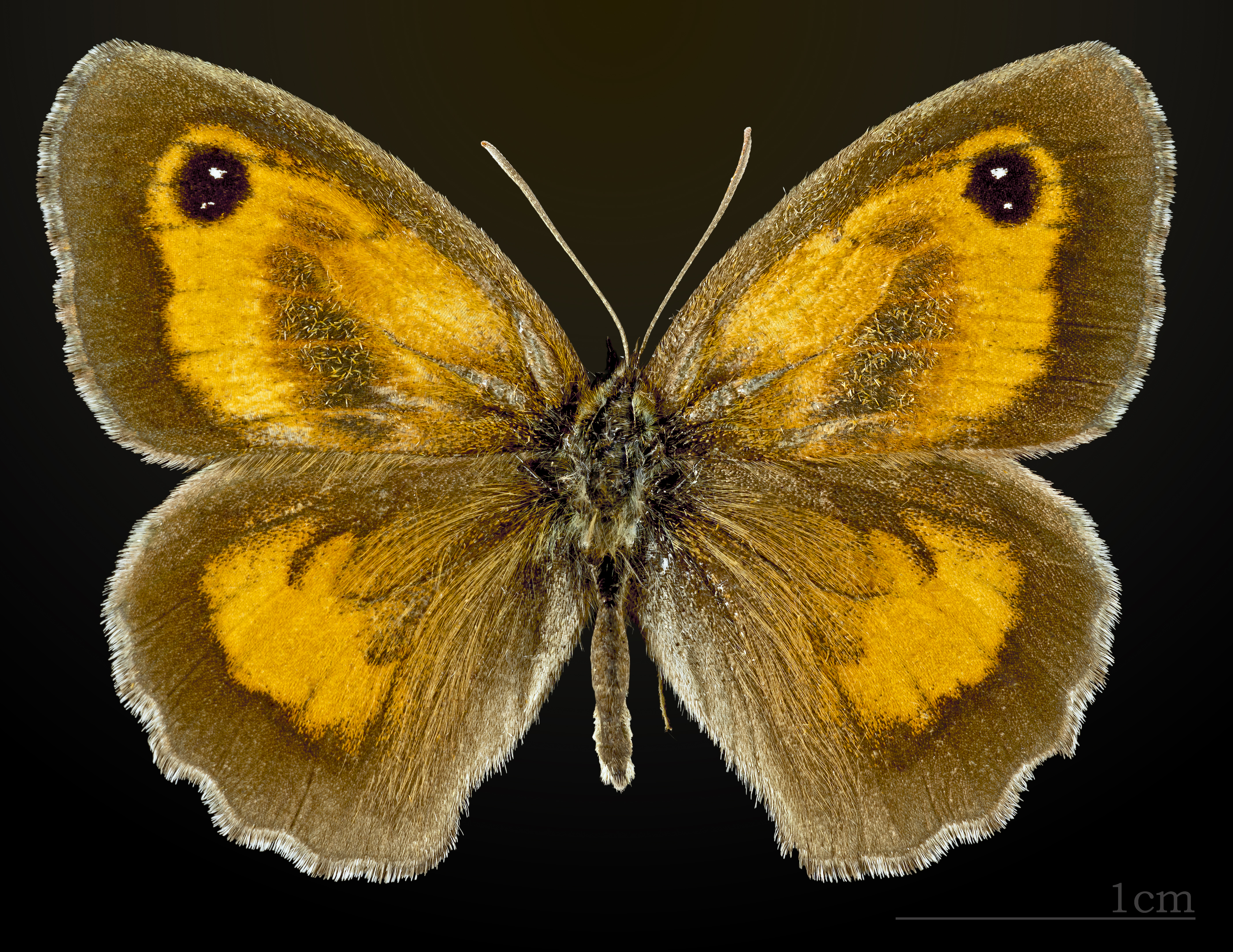
Male

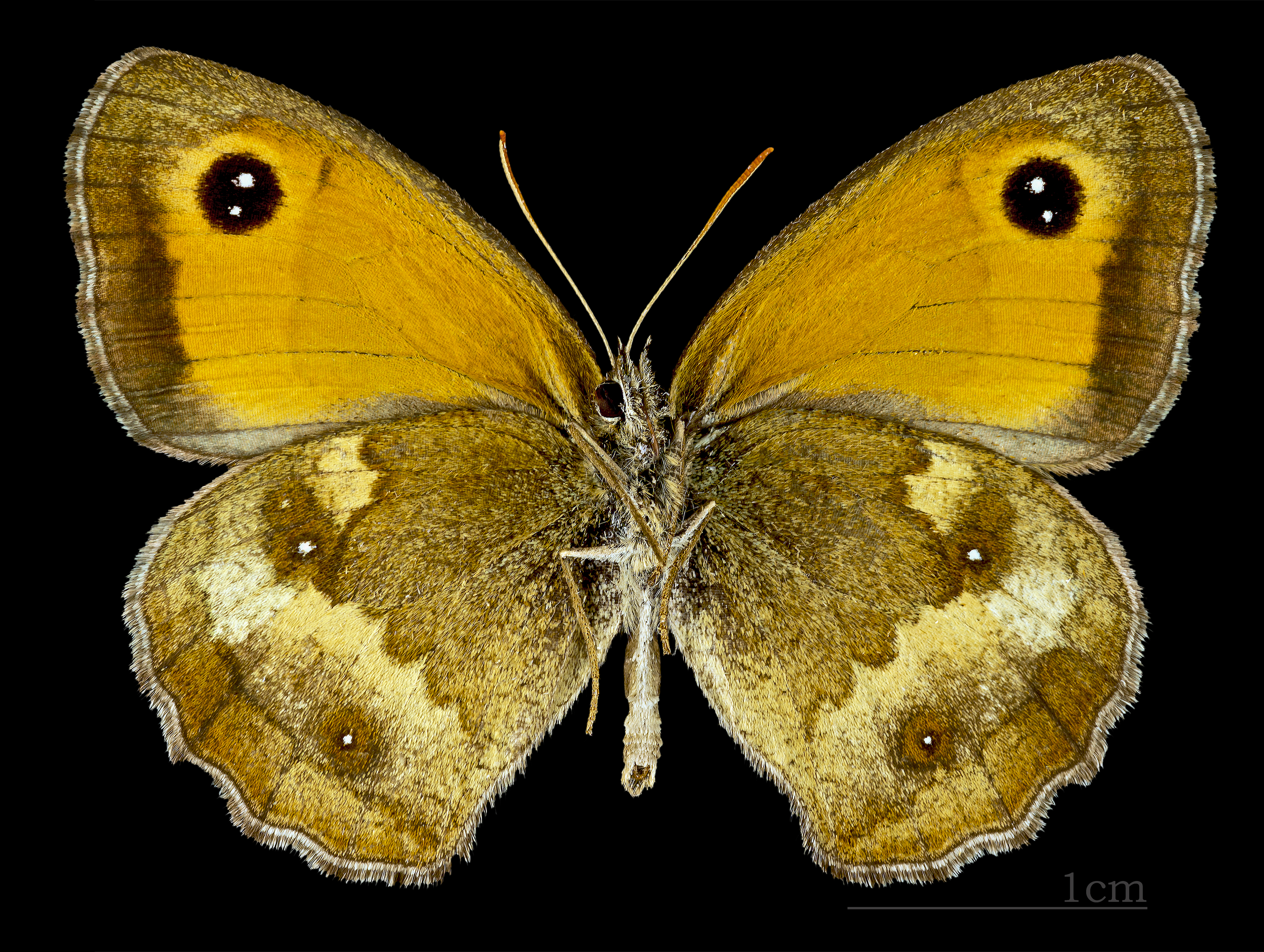
Male underside

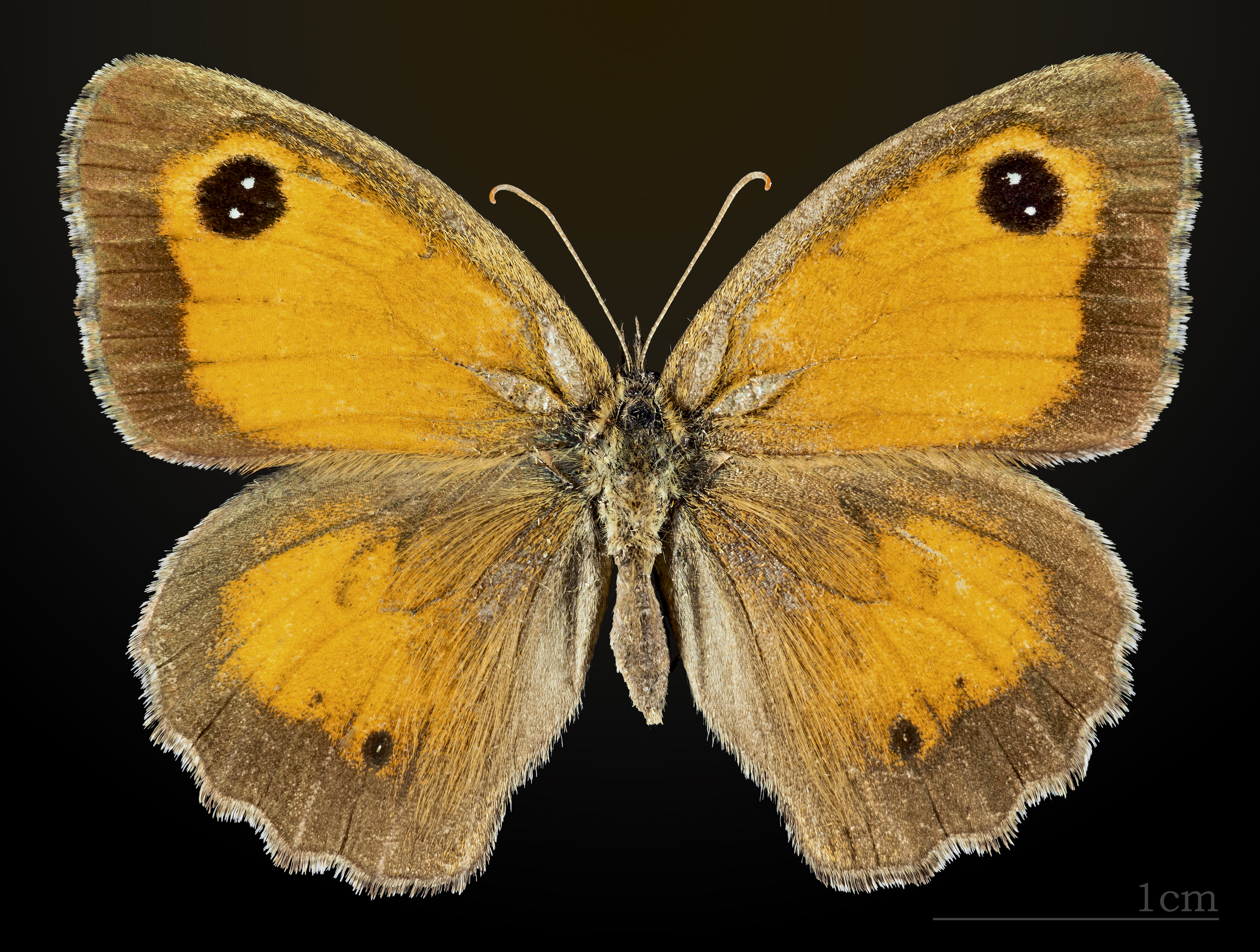
Female

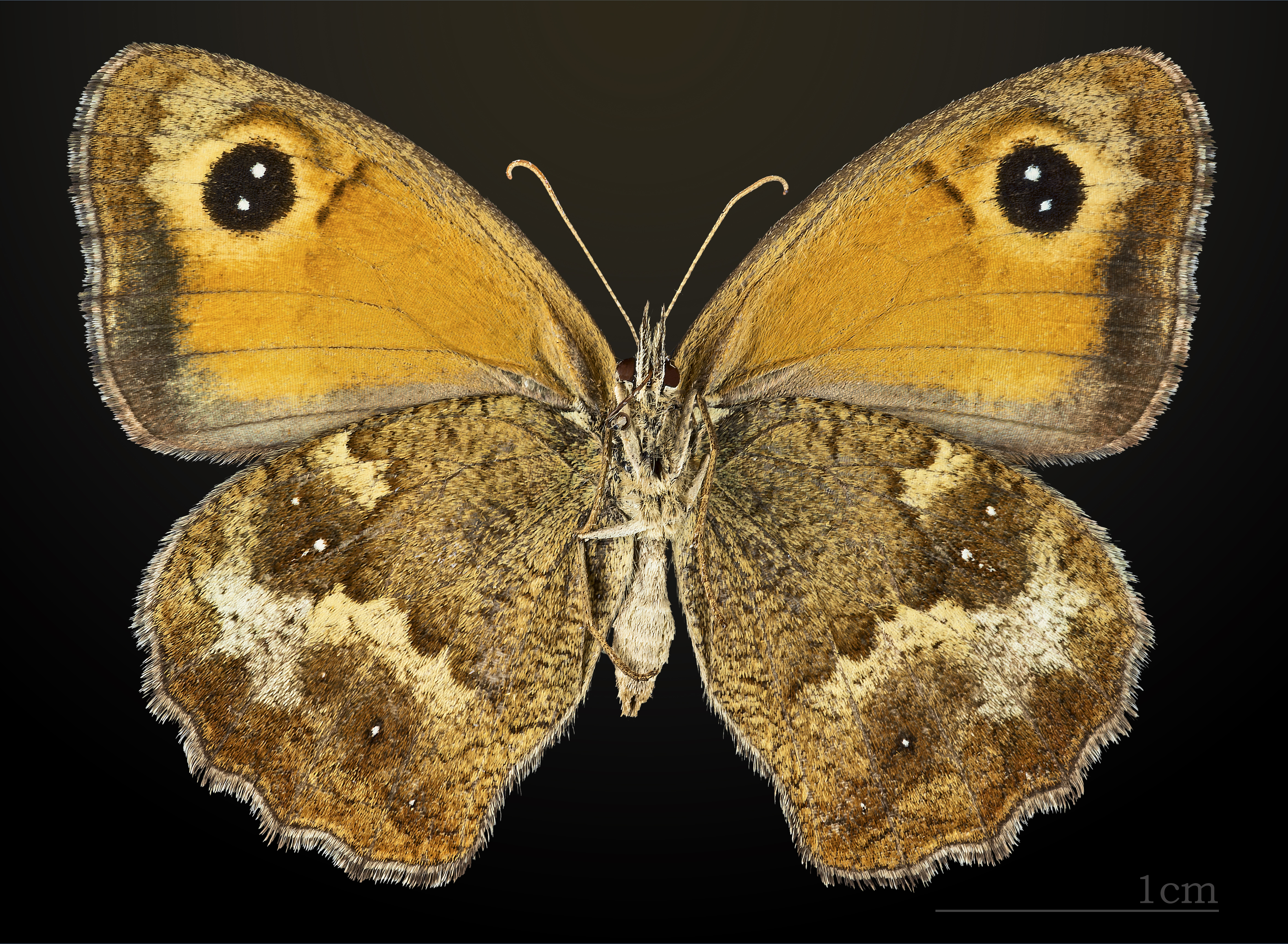
Female underside
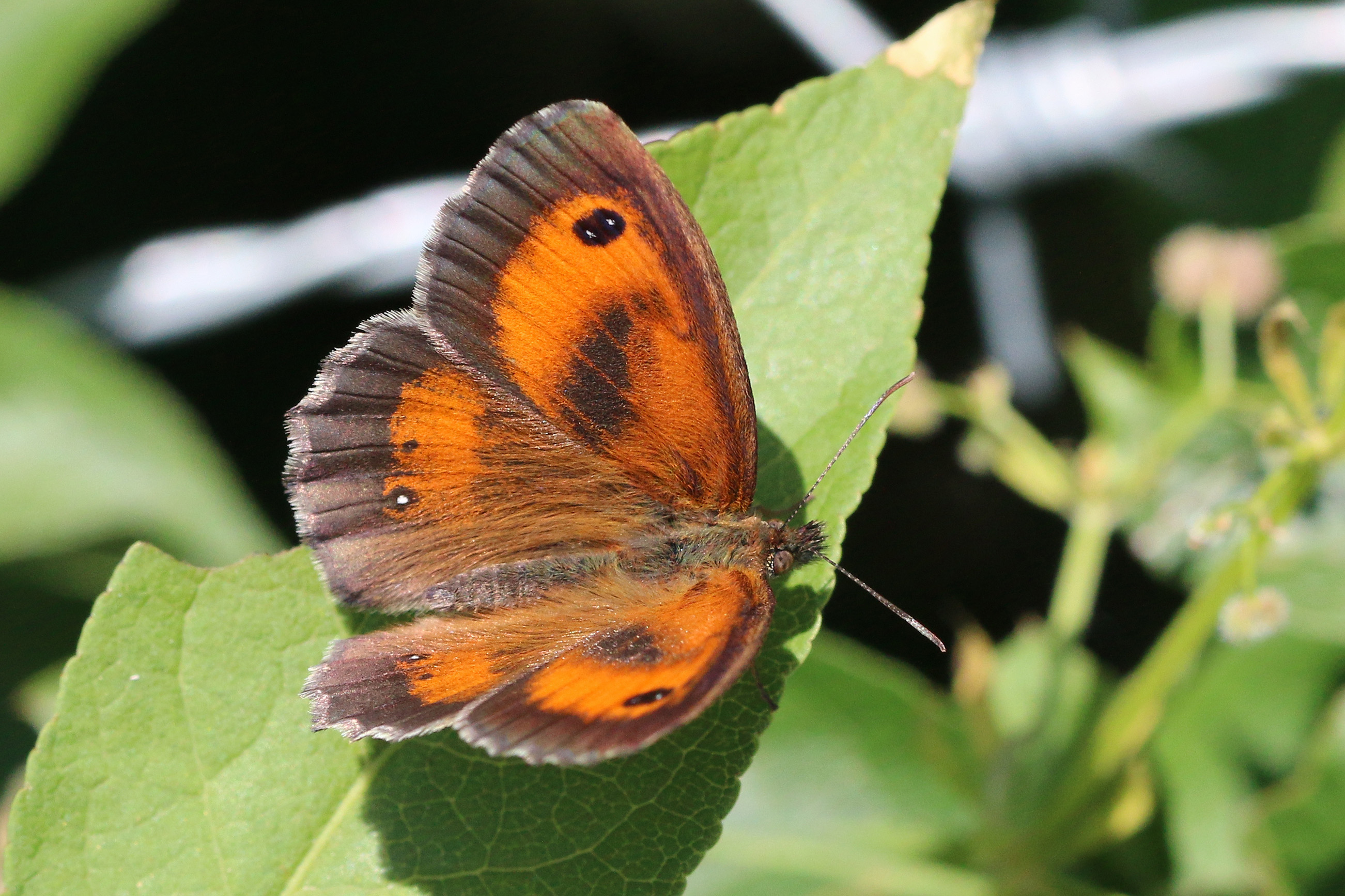
Male

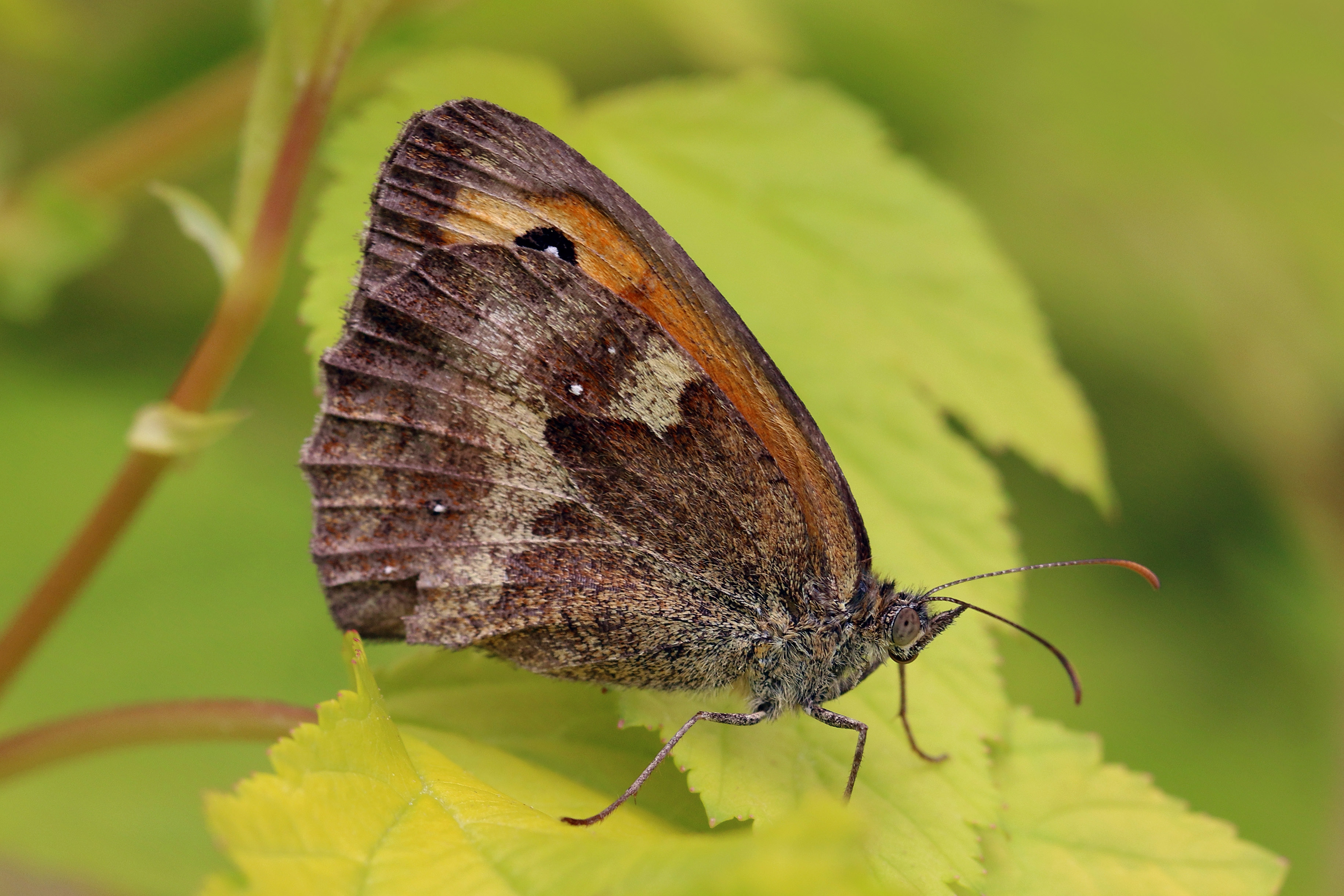
Male underside
six spots on hind wing

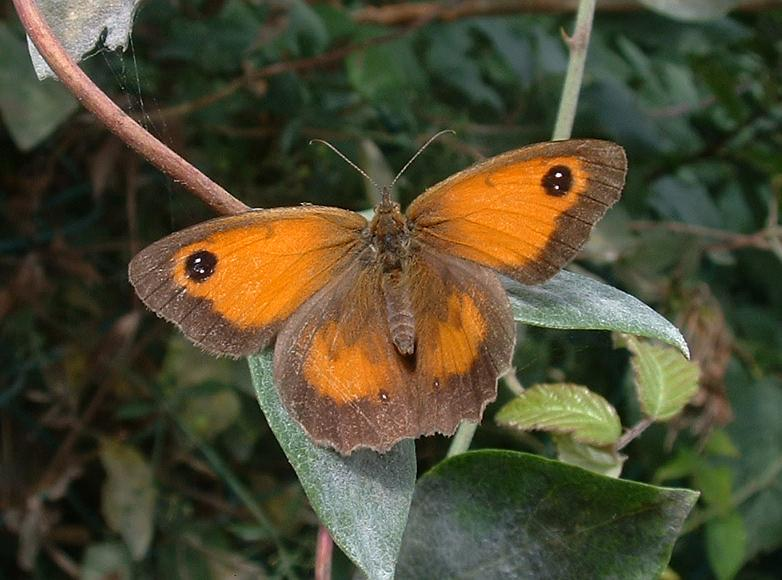
Female

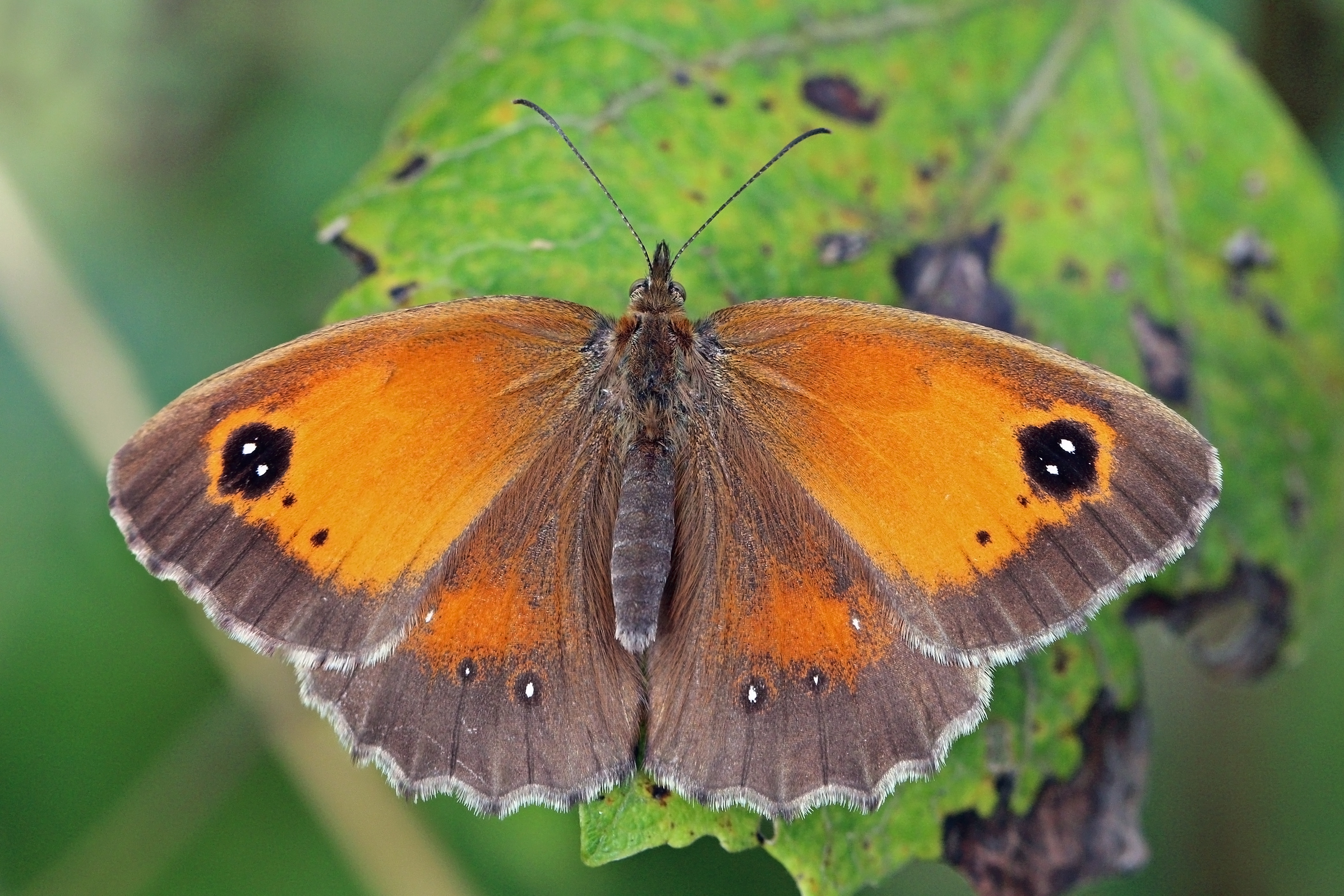
Female
aberration excessa

=== Sexual dimorphism ===
The male has a dark patch on the upper side of the fore wing that contains scent-producing scales known as the androconia. This is most likely for courtship purposes. Androconia have evolved through sexual selection for the purpose of releasing pheromones for attracting mates. Little is known about how androconia actually function during courtship, and the chemical composition of the pheromones is unknown.

Females typically have more spots than males. Males have more costally placed eyespots, compared to the females, whose eyespots are more spread over the wing margin.

== Distribution ==
As indicated by its alternate name, the gatekeeper butterfly prefers the habitat of meadow margins and hedges; field gates are often in such locations, thus the gatekeeper can be found much more frequently in such locations than the meadow brown, for example.

=== Recent expansion and genetic diversity ===
Early in the 20th century, P. tithonus was common in southern Britain, but sparse in the north. In fact, the population contracted before re-expanding beginning in the 1940s. Over the past three decades, the flight range of the gatekeeper has extended northwards in Britain. Furthermore, the length of the flight period has been observed to be significantly shorter close to the edge of the range, suggesting that the extension of flight period and expansion of range are likely to be related. However, the mean flight date and length of flight period are not related. Larger individuals have been found to cover longer distances, and this recent expansion of the gatekeeper may explain the larger size of recent populations.

As a result of recent expansion, the gatekeeper is found in a wide variety of habitats. Some of the largest colonies can be found in scrubby grassland, woodland rides, country lanes, hedgerows, and other similar conditions within its range. This has led to a greater degree of genetic diversity in the gatekeeper compared to other species, such as P. aegeria, which are seen in more limited habitats. However, the contraction of abundance in the early 20th century has limited the potential of this genetic diversity, as bottlenecks and repeated founder events could have occurred during range changes.

Much of the data on changes in P. tithonus population size has been gathered from the UK Butterfly Monitoring Scheme, which has recorded changes of abundance for 71 species between Britain and Ireland since 1976 through visits to more than 1,500 monitoring sites.

== Food ==
P. tithonus is a characteristic field-margin species; it feeds on grasses as larvae and nectar as adults. The larvae of the Satyrinae all feed on grasses, such as rough meadowgrass (Poa trivialis), smooth meadow grass (Poa pratensis), and sheep's fescue (Festuca ovina); they are usually green or brown. The pupae are a flimsy chrysalis either hanging upside down or lying in grass. The adults are often found around blackberry plants. The adult butterfly has a short proboscis and the shallow flowers of the blackberry provide an excellent nectar source.

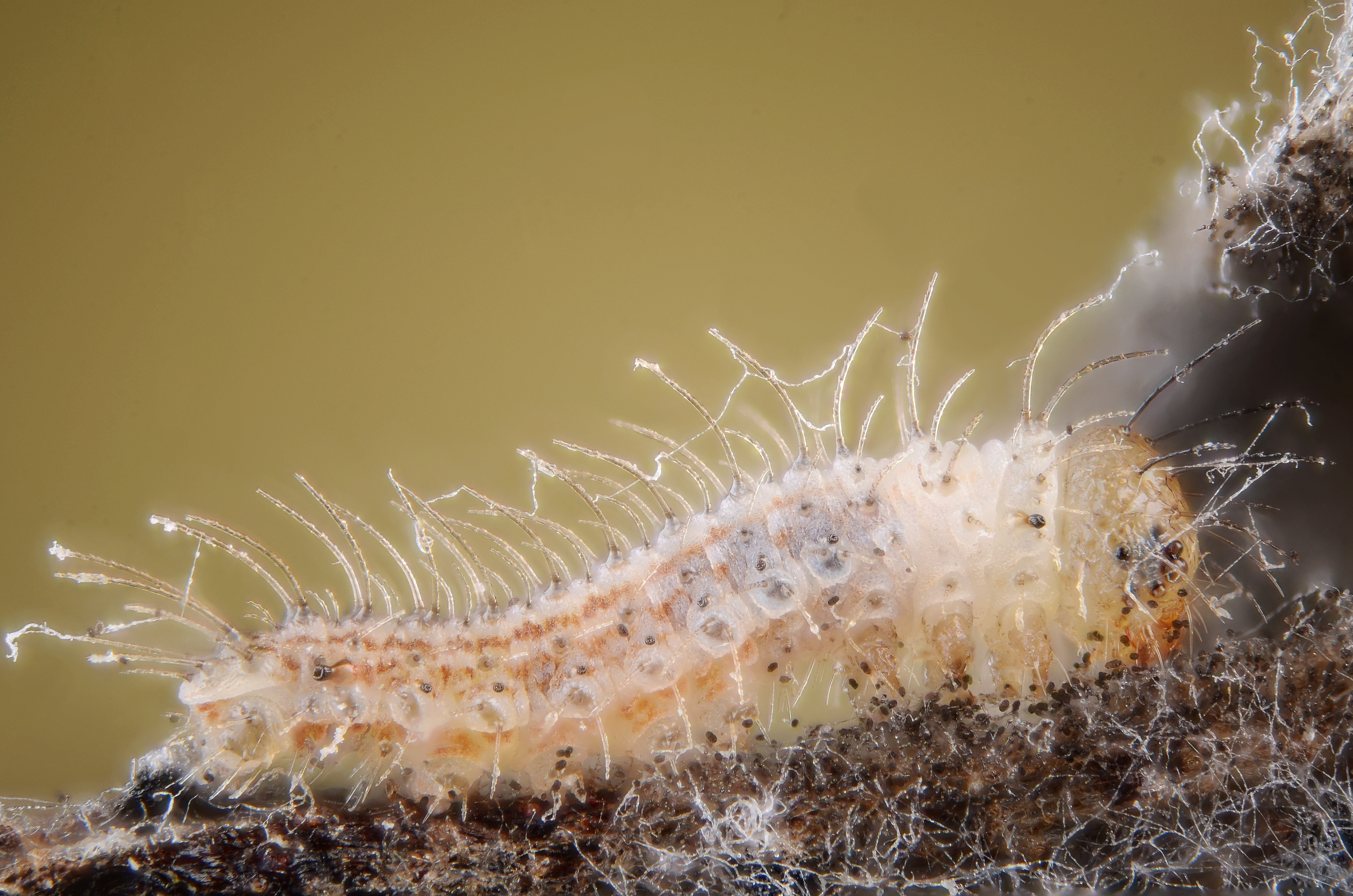
First-instar larva

=== Larval food plants ===
The primary larval food plants are bents (various Agrostis species), fescues (various Festuca species), and meadow-grasses (various Poa species). Common couch (Elymus repens) is also used.

=== Nectar sources ===
Adults feed primarily on bramble (Rubus fruticosus agg.), carline thistle (Carlina vulgaris), devil's-bit scabious (Succisa pratensis), fleabane (Pulicaria dysenterica), hemp agrimony (Eupatorium cannabinum), wild privet (Ligustrum vulgare), ragwort (Jacobaea vulgaris), red clover (Trifolium patense), thistles (Cirsium and Carduus species), thyme (Thymus praecox), and water mint (Mentha aquatica).

== Behaviour ==
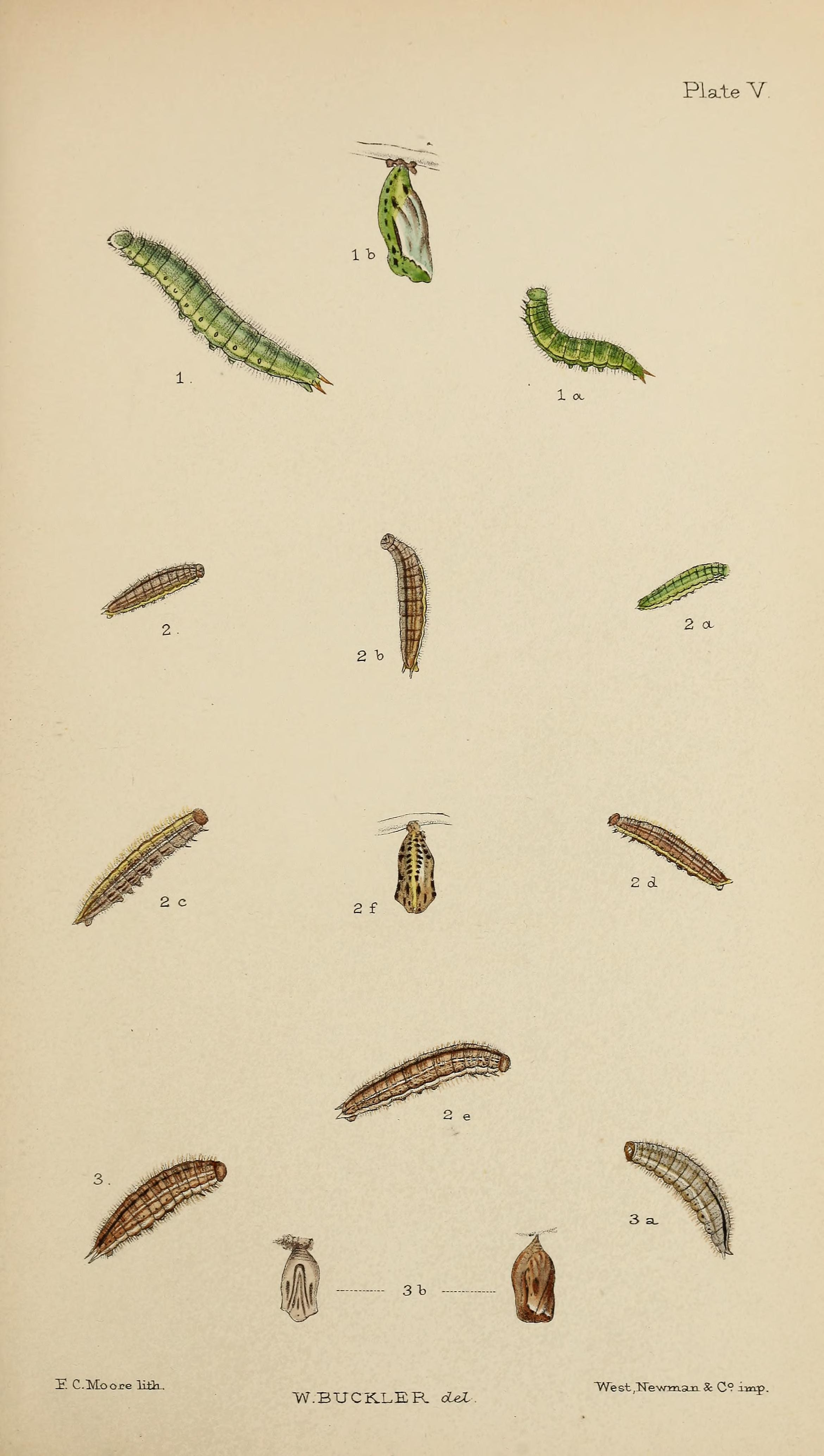
Figs 2, 2a larva after 2nd moult 2b, 2d larva after 3rd moult 2c 2e larva after 4th moult 2f pupa

=== Activity ===
The gatekeeper butterfly tends to rest on vegetation during overcast or hazy sunshine conditions. During sunny weather, it flies from flower to flower gathering nectar. The gatekeeper is a relatively active butterfly, but not very mobile, as seen when comparing it to a similar species, Maniola jurtina. Mobility in butterflies refers to the distance covered from flying, while activity refers to how often they are in flight. In an experiment assessing wing damage, P. tithonus showed faster wing damage as a result of their increased activity, and these results showed that activity levels do not necessarily correlate with mobility. Their low mobility may also explain why they can be very abundant at one site, but not at a similar habitat only a few kilometres away.

Males fly more and are generally more active by spending most of their time locating mates. P. tithonus is a protandrous species, meaning the males emerge before the females. As a result, females usually only mate once, so they have more time available for resting, nectar feeding, host plant selection, and oviposition.

=== Weather influences ===
Weather has been found to have a significant influence on population size. Warm, dry summers tend to result in the biggest increase in gatekeeper population. This weather trend may explain why P. tithonus numbers have been low in northern Britain because of the cooler summers and that range expansion has resulted from climate change. Weather as a cause for changes in relative abundance has been supported in other ways, as well. Changes have also been synchronous between species including P. tithonus, with weather being a potential explanation. Based on these findings on the impact of climate, their abundance is expected to become 50% greater by 2080 given a large climate change.

=== Reproduction ===
One generation of gatekeeper butterflies occurs each year, with adults emerging in July and peaking in early August, and only a few adults remain at the end of the month. No specific courtship ritual is known, but the male scent spots most likely play a role. Males set up small territories and actively seek out a mate. Copulation lasts about an hour, during which the butterflies remain stationary with their wings closed. Females lay between 100 and 200 eggs, usually in the shade or at random by ejecting eggs into the air. Initially, larvae are yellow, but soon develop brown patches and continue to darken as they develop within the egg. Eggs hatch after about 14 days.
