= Neoserica kalliesi =

Scientific classification
- Kingdom: Animalia
- Phylum: Arthropoda
- Class: Insecta
- Order: Coleoptera
- Suborder: Polyphaga
- Infraorder: Scarabaeiformia
- Family: Scarabaeidae
- Genus: Neoserica
- Species: N. kalliesi

Binomial name
- Neoserica kalliesi Ahrens, 2003

Species of beetle

Neoserica kalliesi is a species of beetle of the family Scarabaeidae. It is found in Vietnam.

== Description ==
Adults reach a length of about 6.7–7.7 mm. They have a black to reddish-brown, short-oval body. Part of the upper surface has a greenish shimmer. They are mostly dull with dense light hairs, interspersed with dense, long, strong, dark hairs. The underside is densely haired.

== Etymology ==
The species is named after the collector of the type specimen, Lepidopterist Axel Kallies.
