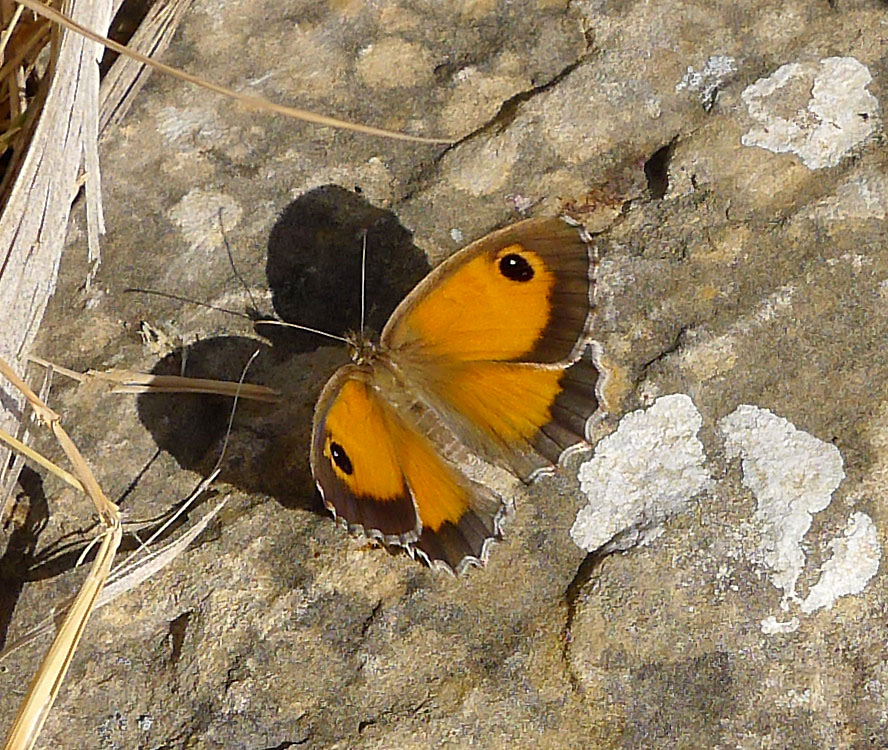
- Female

Scientific classification
- Domain: Eukaryota
- Kingdom: Animalia
- Phylum: Arthropoda
- Class: Insecta
- Order: Lepidoptera
- Family: Nymphalidae
- Genus: Pyronia
- Species: P. cecilia

Binomial name
- Pyronia cecilia (Vallantin, 1894)

= Pyronia cecilia =

Southern gatekeeper

Species of butterfly

Pyronia cecilia, the southern gatekeeper, is a butterfly of Southern Europe and North Africa. It is a member of the subfamily Satyrinae in the family Nymphalidae.

== Description ==
It is similar in appearance to the gatekeeper (P. tithonus), which is found further north, and the Spanish gatekeeper (P. bathsheba). The gatekeeper has spots on the underside of the hindwing which the southern gatekeeper lacks. The Spanish gatekeeper has quite a different underwing pattern with a prominent while band.

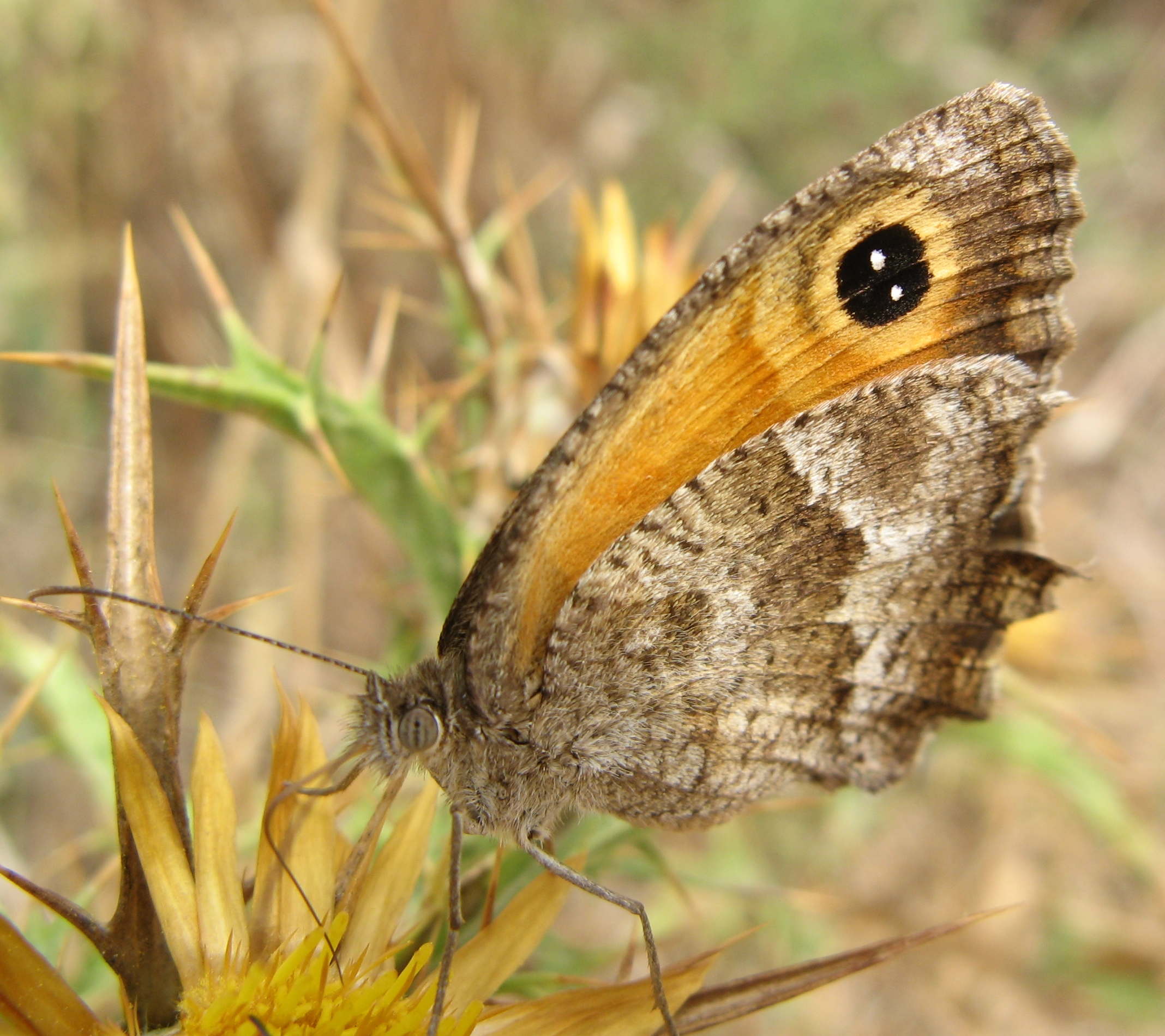
Southern gatekeeper showing lack of spots on underside of hindwing

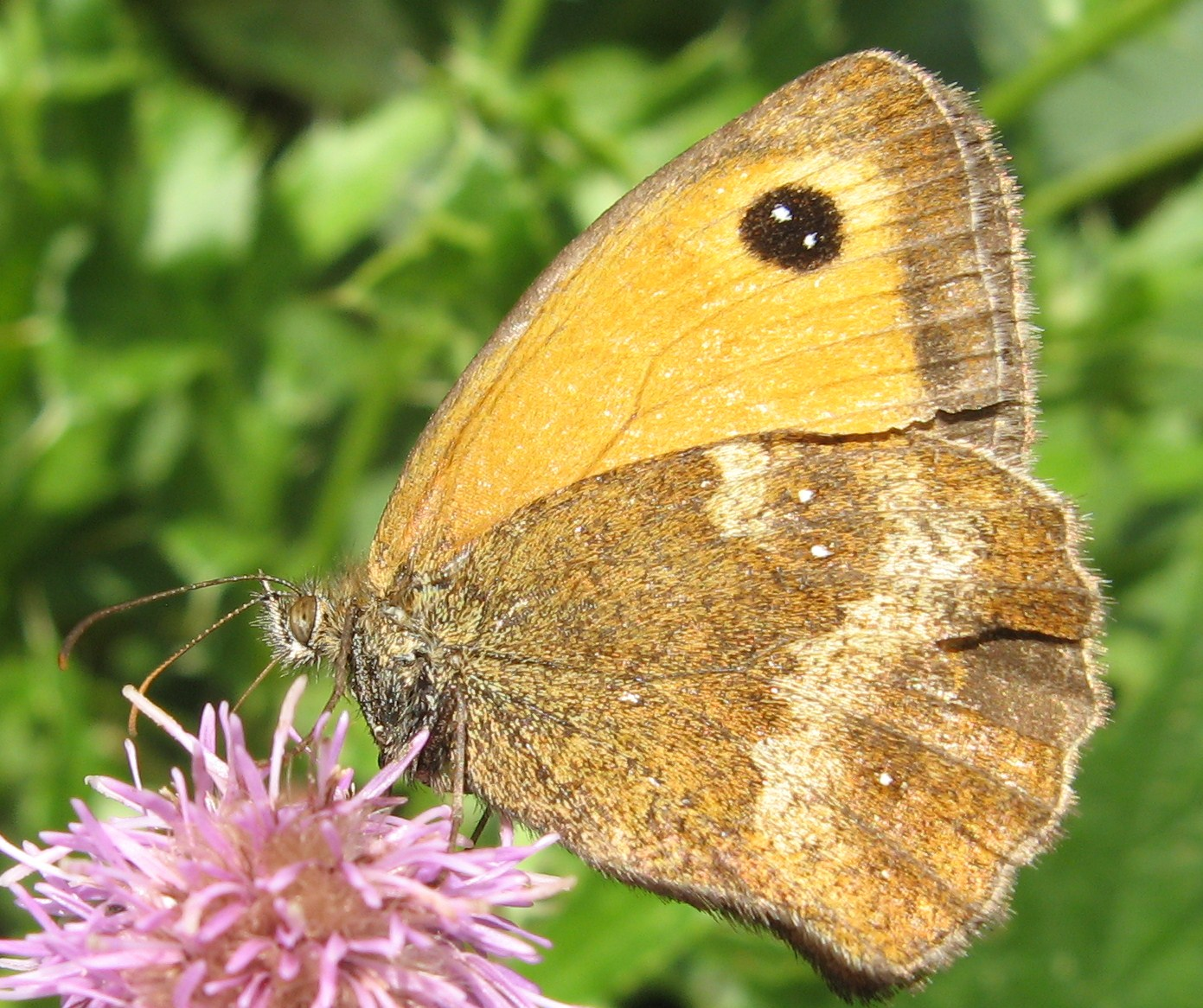
Gatekeeper showing small white spots on the underwing

=== Sexual dimorphism ===
The southern gatekeeper, like many in subspecies Satyrinae, exhibits sexual dimorphism. The male is smaller than the female, the front wing of the male is 15 to 16 mm whereas a female front wing is 20 mm, and has a patch of scent-producing scales known as the androconia, which can be seen as a dark patch on the upperside of the forewing.

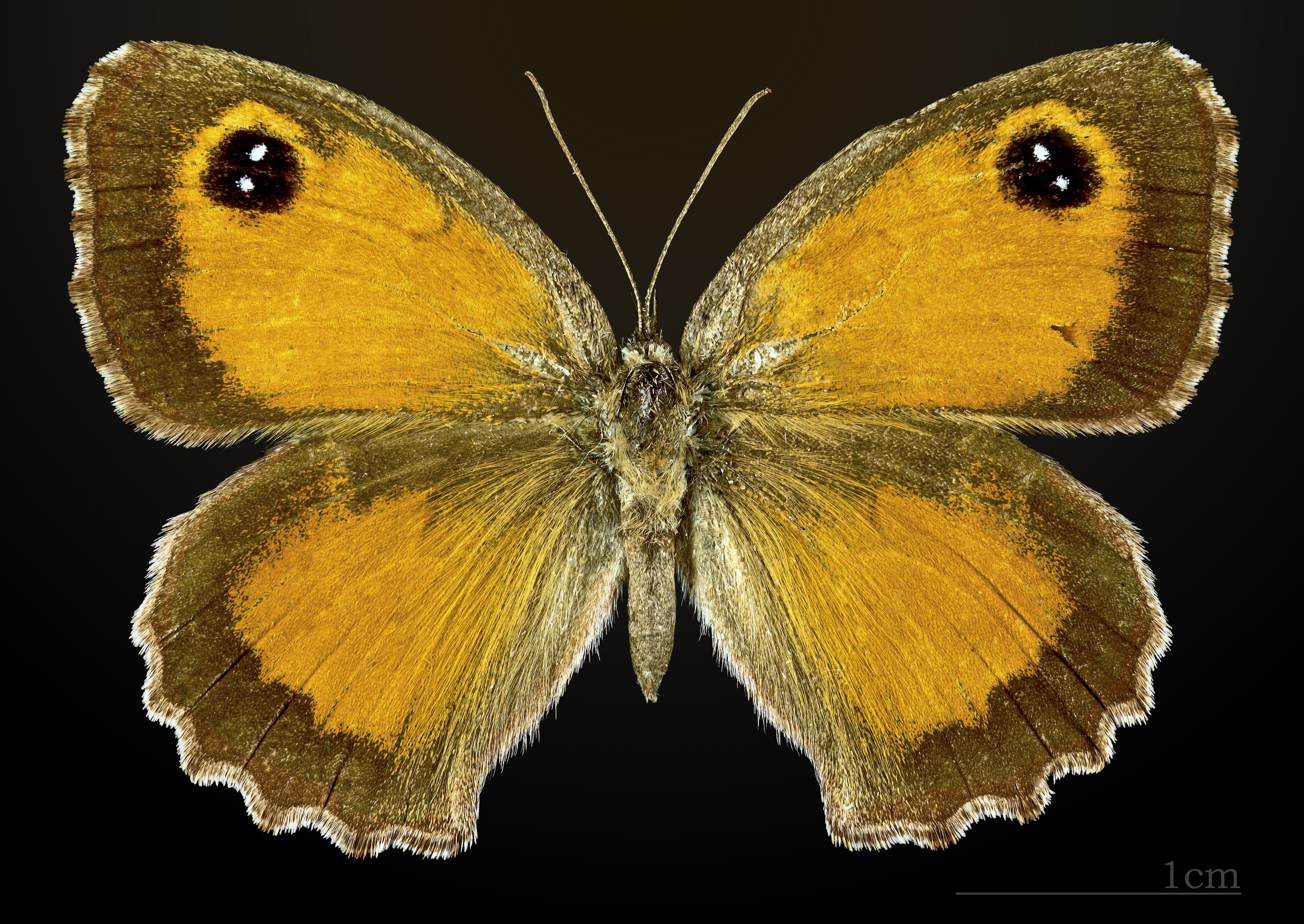
Female

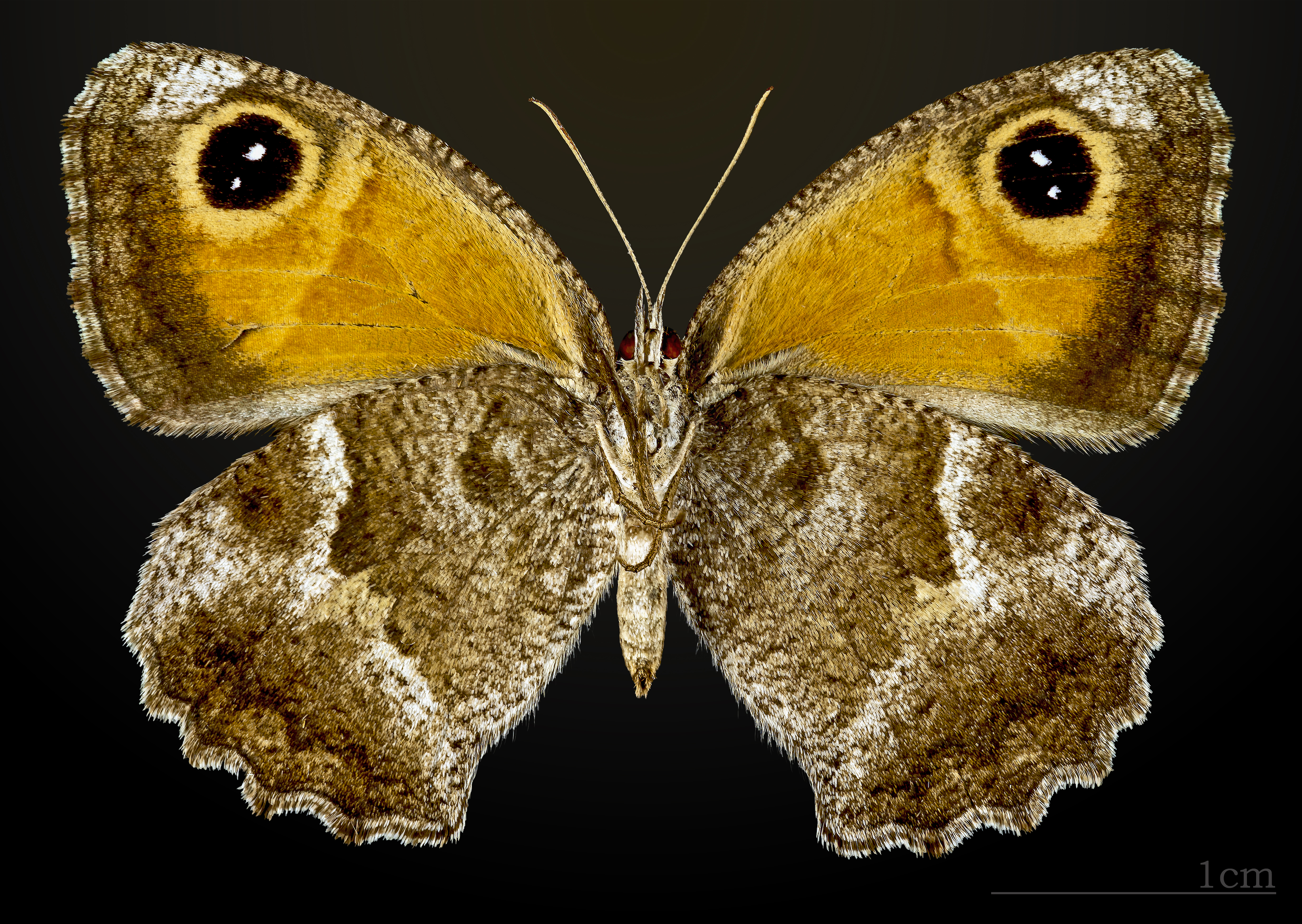
Female underside

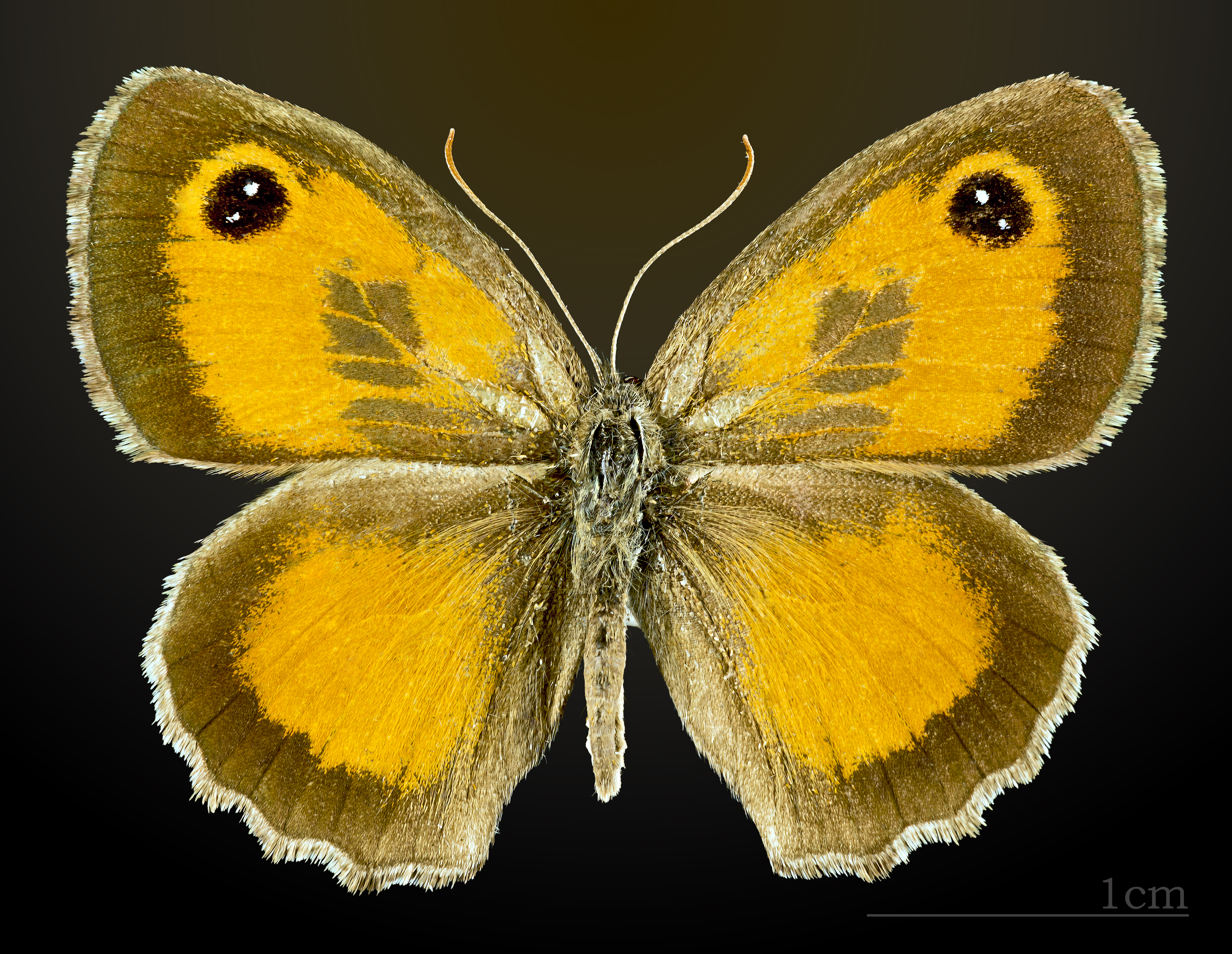
Male

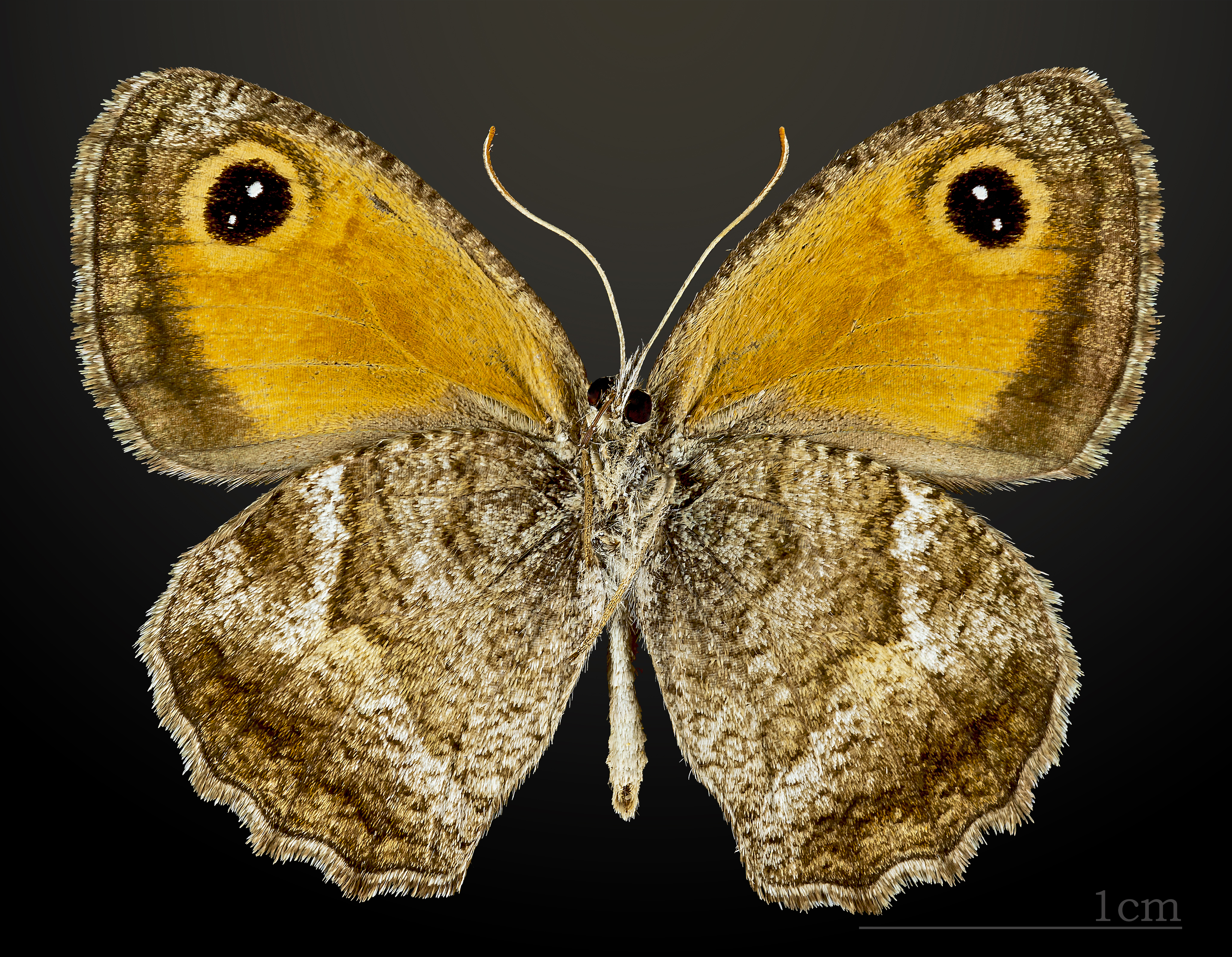
Male underside

== Distribution and habitat ==
The southern gatekeeper likes hot localities and is found in northern Africa and southern Europe; in Tunisia, Algeria, Morocco, Portugal, Spain including Mallorca and Menorca, south-eastern France, Corsica, Sardinia, Elba, Italy, Sicily, Croatia, Albania, Greece and Turkey. It is usually found in rough, open areas in lowland regions although in some areas it occurs up to 2,000 m (6,600 ft).

== Food plants ==
Food plants are grasses including Deschampsia cespitosa

== See also ==
- List of butterflies of Menorca
