= Lepidopterology =

Branch of entomology that studies moths and butterflies

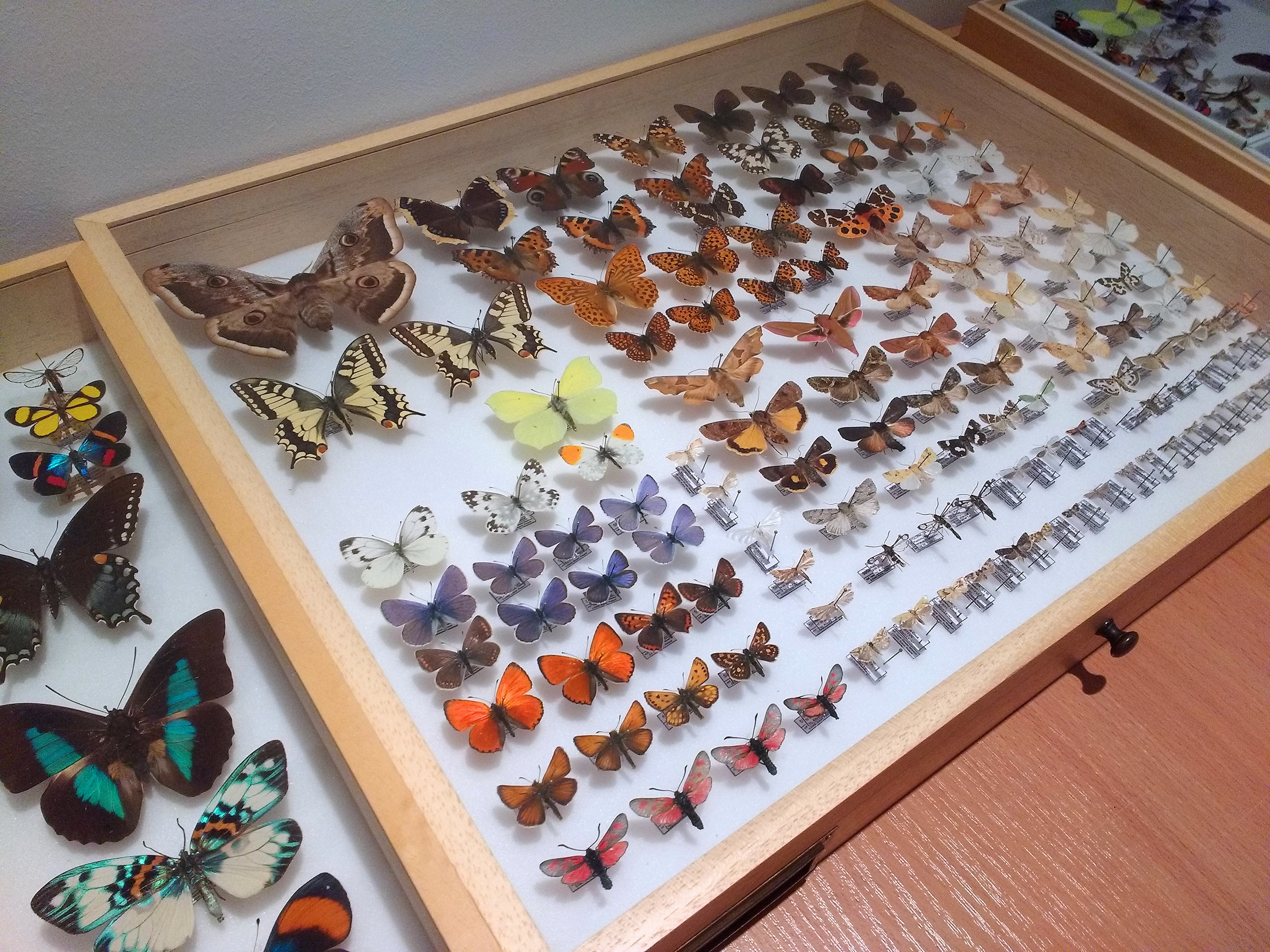
A Lepidoptera specimen drawer in a museum collection in Poland

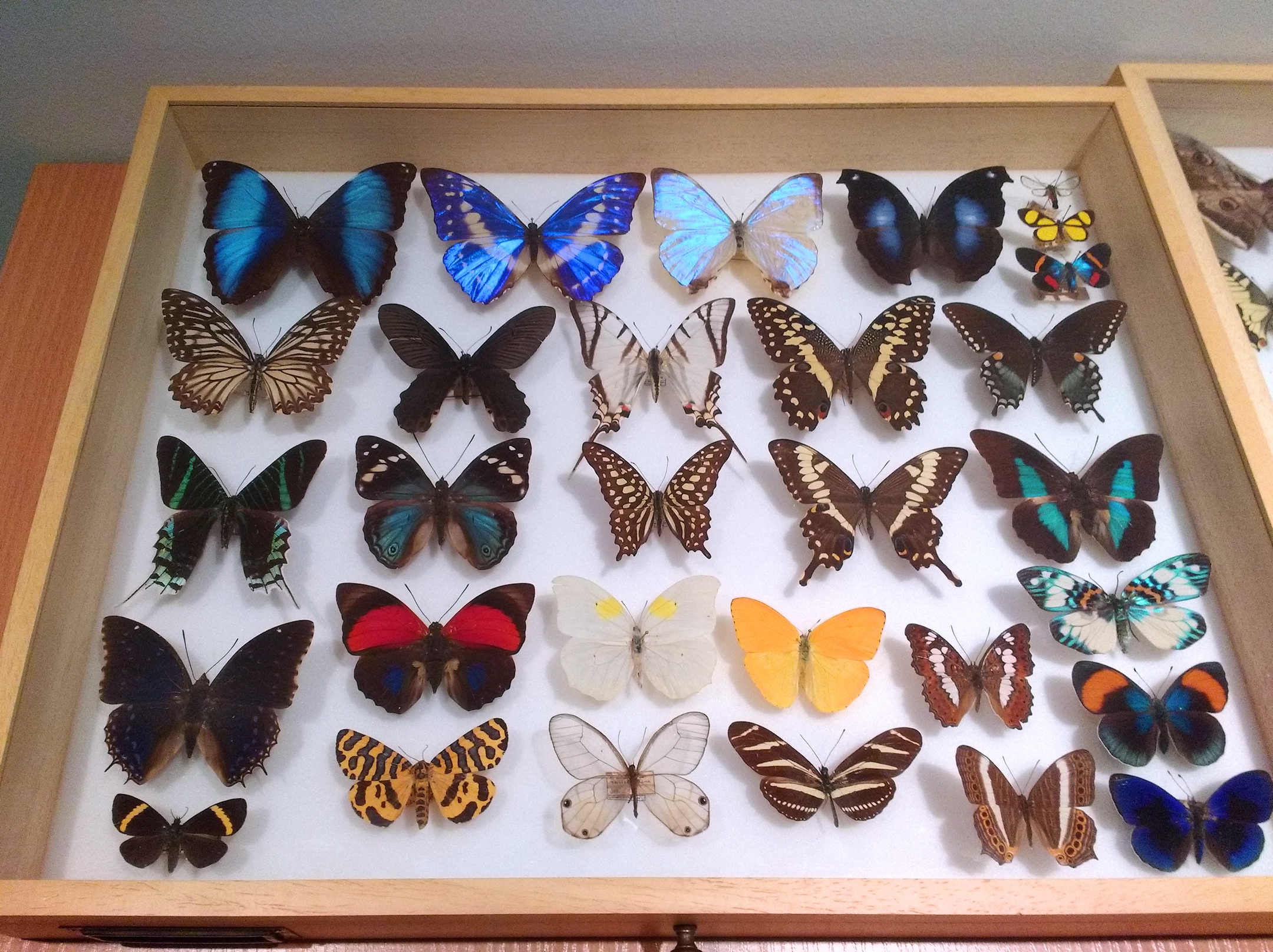
Another Lepidoptera specimen drawer in a museum collection in Poland

Lepidopterology (from Ancient Greek λεπίδος (lepídos) 'scale', πτερόν (pterón) 'wing' and -λογία (-logia)) is a branch of entomology concerning the scientific study of moths and butterflies. Someone who studies in this field is a lepidopterist or, archaically, an aurelian.

== Origins ==
Post-Renaissance, the rise of the "lepidopterist" can be attributed to the expanding interest in science, nature and the surroundings. When Linnaeus wrote the tenth edition of the Systema Naturae in 1758, there was already "a substantial body of published work on Lepidopteran natural history" (Kristensen, 1999).

These included:

- Insectorum sive Minimorum Animalium Theatrum – Thomas Mouffet (1634)
- Metamorphosis Naturalis – Jan Goedart (1662–67 )
- Metamorphosis insectorum Surinamensium – Maria S. Merian (1705), whose work included illustrated accounts of European Lepidoptera
- Historia Insectorum – John Ray (1710)
- Papilionum Brittaniae icones – James Petiver (1717)

== History ==
=== Scholars ===
1758–1900 was the era of the gentleman scientist. Following Linnaeus' descriptions in Systema Naturae and with Boas Johansson in Centuria Insectorum, the Austrian Nikolaus Poda von Neuhaus wrote Insecta Musei Graecensis (1761) and Johann Christian Fabricius described very many more species in a series of major works.

During this period, Ignaz Schiffermüller wrote a systematic catalogue of the butterflies of the districts around Vienna Systematische Verzeichnis der Schmetterlinge der Wienergegend herausgegeben von einigen Lehrern am k. k. Theresianum (1775). In Germany Eugenius Johann Christoph Esper in collaboration with Toussaint de Charpentier published Die europäischen Schmetterlinge (European butterflies online here) and Die ausländischen Schmetterlinge (World butterflies online here).

Between 1806 and 1834 Jacob Hübner wrote Sammlung exotischer Schmetterlinge ["Collection of exotic butterflies"] (2 vols.), Augsburg with Carl Geyer and Gottlieb August Wilhelm Herrich-Schäffer. During the years of 1806–1824 Hübner added Geschichte europäischer Schmetterlinge ["History of European butterflies"]. Herrich-Schäffer expanded this as Systematische Bearbeitung der Schmetterlinge von Europa, Zugleich als Text, Revision und Supplement zu Jacob Hubner’s Sammlung europäischer Schmetterlinge (six volumes, 1843–1856).

In France Jean Baptiste Boisduval, Jules Pierre Rambur and Adolphe Hercule de Graslin wrote Collection iconographique et historique des chenilles; ou, Description et figures des chenilles (larvae) d'Europe, avec l'histoire de leurs métamorphoses, et des applications à l'agriculture, Paris, Librairie encyclopédique de Roret, 1832 and with John Eatton Le Conte, 1829–1837 Histoire général et iconographie des lepidoptérès et des chenilles de l’Amerique septentrionale (General history and illustrations of the Lepidoptera and caterpillars of Northern America) which was published in Paris. Boisduval also described Lepidoptera from the expedition ship Astrolabe of Jean-François de Galaup, comte de La Pérouse and the Coquille, that of Louis Isidore Duperrey.

In Italy, Giovanni Antonio Scopoli wrote Entomologia Carniolica published in Vienna. In the mid-century period, the expert knowledge of Lepidoptera dealers such as Otto Staudinger, Emile Deyrolle, Orazio Querci, and Peter Godeffroy contributed to the field.

In Russia, Andrey Avinoff, a member of the diplomatic corps of Tsar Nicholas II, sponsored more than forty collecting expeditions to Central Asia in search of rare Lepidoptera. He personally undertook arduous expeditions to Russian Turkestan and the Pamir in 1908 and through India and Kashmir in 1914, as well as to Ladakh and Chinese Turkestan before those regions were open to explorers. Prior to the political upheaval of 1917, he was awarded the Imperial Russian Geographical Society's prestigious gold medal. The Soviet government appropriated his collection and placed it in the Zoological Museum of St. Petersburg. After Avinoff emigrated to America, he was able to collect a near-duplicate of his original Asiatic butterfly collection, donating it to the Carnegie Museum of Natural History.

=== Explorers ===
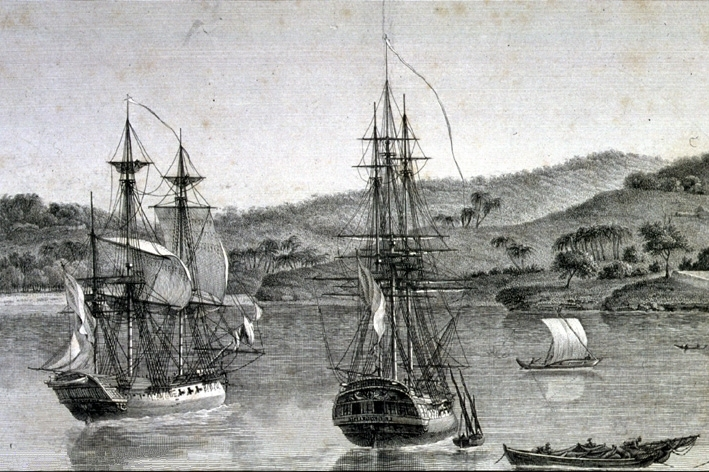
Géographe and Naturaliste

Expeditions continued to be major sources of specimens. The Baudin expedition to Australia (1800 to 1803) with two laboratory-equipped ships Géographe and Naturaliste had nine zoologists and botanists on board. They brought back to France, according to Antoine François, comte de Fourcroy, the largest collection Muséum national d'Histoire naturelle had ever received including 44 crates of zoological specimens. The Österreichische Brasilien-Expedition explored the Botany, Zoology and Ethnography of Brazil. It was organized and financed for Austrian Empire and ran from 1817 to 1835. SMS Novara, under the command of Commodore Bernhard von Wüllerstorf-Urbair, made a voyage of exploration in 1857–1859. Baron Cajetan von Felder and his son Rudolf Felder amassed a huge entomological collection from the Novara that is deposited in the Naturhistorisches Museum in Vienna and the Natural History Museum in London. The butterflies were described in Reise Fregatte Novara: Zoologischer Theil., Lepidoptera, Rhopalocera (Journey of the Frigate Novara...) in three volumes (1865–1867). Andrey Avinoff and/or some of his benefactors also financed numerous expeditions from approximately 1906–1940.

=== Collectors ===
Wealthy collectors played a major role: Aimée Fournier de Horrack in Paris, Walter Rothschild and James John Joicey in England and in Russia Grand Duke Nicholas Mikhailovich of Russia who funded Sergei Alphéraky and edited Mémoires sur les Lépidoptères. The British Empire provided opportunities to Frederic Moore author of Lepidoptera Indica. The Carnegie and Mellon families helped finance the collection and acquisition of butterfly collections through their investments into the newly created Carnegie Museum of Natural History headed up by Andrey Avinoff from 1926 to 1945.

=== Museums ===
In the nineteenth century, large collections of Lepidoptera were amongst the natural history specimens then flooding into Europe. Most of the largest and most specimens of new species are in Musée royal de l'Afrique centrale (Belgian Congo), Muséum national d'Histoire naturelle (French colonial empire), Museum für Naturkunde (German colonial empire), British Museum (Natural History) (British colonial Empire), Zoological Museum in St. Petersburg, and Rijksmuseum van Natuurlijke Historie (Dutch Empire). Museum lepidopterists have included Samuel Constantinus Snellen van Vollenhoven. Francis Walker, Alois Friedrich Rogenhofer, František Antonín Nickerl, Lionel de Nicéville, Carl Heinrich Hopffer and Arthur Gardiner Butler.

== Notable lepidopterists ==
Some notable lepidopterists are or have been:

- Per Olof Christopher Aurivillius of Sweden: butterflies of Africa
- Andrey Avinoff of Russia and the U.S.A: butterflies of Central Asia and Jamaica
- Henry Tibbats Stainton of England: Microlepidoptera
- Jules Léon Austaut of France: specialized in Parnassius
- Otto Vasilievich Bremer of Russia: butterflies of Siberia and Amur
- John Henry Leech of England: butterflies of China
- Shōnen Matsumura of Japan: butterflies of Japan
- Hans Rebel of Austria: butterflies of the Palearctic
- Maria Sibylla Merian of the Dutch Republic: butterflies and moths of Surinam
- Ruggero Verity of Italy: butterflies of the Palearctic
- Hans Fruhstorfer of Germany: world butterflies, but especially Java
- Edward Meyrick of England: Microlepidoptera
- Herman Strecker of the U.S.A.: butterflies of the Americas
- Anthony Valletta of Malta: butterflies of Malta
- Margaret Fountaine of England: Europe, South Africa, India, Tibet, America, Australia and the West Indies.
- Edna Mosher of Canada: A Classification of the Lepidoptera based on characters of the pupae

== Collections and illustrations ==
As the chief mode of study of butterflies was through pinned specimen collections, it was difficult to catalogue and communicate names and descriptions widely. Books on butterflies with plates that were either hand-painted, lithographed and printed have been a major tool in lepidopterology. These include the massive works by Adalbert Seitz.

Unusual works like the Butterfly Fauna of Ceylon (1942) by Lionel Gilbert Ollyett Woodhouse (1888–1965) and Moths and Butterflies of the United States East of the Rocky Mountains (1900) by Sherman F. Denton made use of butterfly wing-prints where the illustrations incorporated the scales of the wings.

The illustrious Russian writer, Vladimir Nabokov was a noted lepidopterist, having discovered the passion at the age of seven. He would later write about butterflies, collect, and illustrate them. Nabokov volunteered at Harvard's Museum of Comparative Zoology in the Entomology Department, where he would organize specimens for as much as 14 hours a day.

According to Kurt Johnson, the lepidopterist author of Nabokov's Blues, Nabokov's novel Dar (The Gift), featured a lepidopterist, the father of the émigré protagonist, based on a fictionalization of Andrey Avinoff. Avinoff discovered several new species: in Central Asia, the Parnassius Maharaja Avinoff and in Jamaica the Shoumatoff Hairstreak, Nesiostrymon shoumatoffi, named after his nephew, Nicholas Shoumatoff who joined him on three expeditions to the wild Cockpit Country in the late 1930s. () Avinoff's groundbreaking research on the biogeography of speciation demonstrated how members of the genus Karanasa evolved into separate species in isolated mountain valleys in the Pamir Range. He collaborated with his colleague Walter Sweadner, a curator of entomology at the Carnegie Museum, on a monograph, The Karanasa Butterflies, A Study in Evolution.

== Societies ==
Lepidopterists are served by a number of national and international scientific societies. They promote research in lepidopterology and dissemination of the findings through conferences such as the biennial European Congresses of Lepidopterology or the TILS Leps Talk. These societies include:

- Lepidopterists' Society
- Societas Europaea Lepidopterologica
- Lepidoptera Research Foundation
- North American Butterfly Association
- Association for Tropical Lepidoptera
- International Lepidoptera Survey
- Lepidopterological Society of Denmark
- Lepidopterological Society of Finland
- Lepidopterological Society of Japan
- Sicilian Lepidopterological Association
- Southern Lepidopterists' Society
- Societat Catalana de Lepidopterologia
- Study Group of Hessian Lepidopterologists
- Lepidopterists' Society of Africa

== Journals ==
- Journal of Research on the Lepidoptera 1962–2017
- Metamorphosis
- The Taxonomic Report
- Nota Lepidopterologica

== See also ==
- The Global Lepidoptera Names Index
- Lepidoptera in the 10th edition of Systema Naturae
- McGuire Center for Lepidoptera and Biodiversity, University of Florida
- Butterfly watching
