= Butterfly watching =

Observing butterflies as a hobby

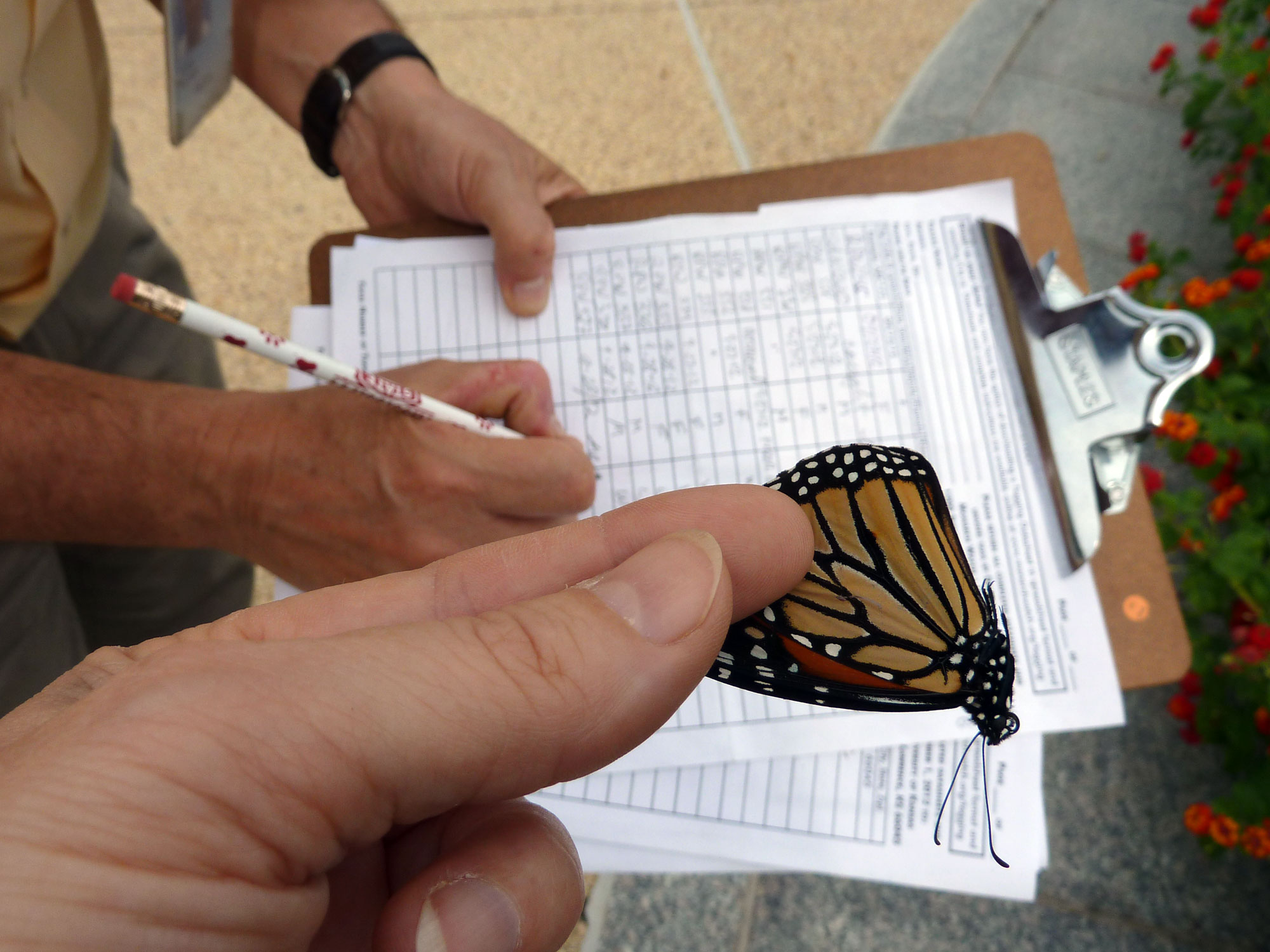
Monitoring a monarch butterfly

Butterfly watching is a hobby concerned with the observation and study of butterflies. It also includes the "catch and release" of butterflies. There are clubs, handbooks, checklists, and festivals devoted to the activity.

The Canada Day and Fourth of July annual butterfly count, a census of species by butterfly watchers throughout North America, is an example of citizen science.

== Locations ==
Some well-known butterfly watching locations include Costa Rica, the Amazon Basin, and sub-Saharan Africa.

== See also ==
- Butterfly gardening
- Butterfly field guides by region
- Lepidopterist
