= Pyronia janiroides =

Scientific classification
- Kingdom: Animalia
- Phylum: Arthropoda
- Clade: Pancrustacea
- Class: Insecta
- Order: Lepidoptera
- Family: Nymphalidae
- Genus: Pyronia
- Species: P. janiroides

Binomial name
- Pyronia janiroides (Herrich-Schäffer, 1851)

Synonyms
- Epinephele janiroides Herrich-Schäffer, 1851; Pyronia abbreviata Seitz, 1908; Pyronia tisamene Boisduval, 1876

Species of butterfly from Africa

Pyronia janiroides, the false meadow brown, is a species of brush-footed butterfly in the family Nymphalidae. It was first described by entomologist and physician Gottlieb August Herrich-Schäffer in 1851 and is found in northern Africa, most commonly Algeria and Tunisia.
