= Society for European Lepidopterology =

Organization for the study of moths and butterflies

- Abbreviation: SEL
- Formation: 1976
- Type: Environmental
- Official language: English
- Website: www.soceurlep.eu

The Society for European Lepidopterology (SEL, formerly Societas Europaea Lepidopterologica) is a European society for the study of moths and butterflies and for the conservation of these insects and their natural habitats. The society was founded in 1976 with the aims of promoting collaboration among the lepidopterists of Europe, Western Asia and North Africa, and of promoting conservation of Lepidoptera and the natural habitats they live in.

The membership of the SEL comprises a large proportion of the active European professional researchers in the fields of Lepidoptera systematics, morphology, behaviour, faunistics, biogeography, biodiversity, ecology and conservation biology. It similarly comprises a large proportion of the European amateur specialists, whose contributions to the knowledge about this group of insects continues to be of paramount significance. For many SEL members, collecting butterflies and moths is a major interest, and the society is invested in .

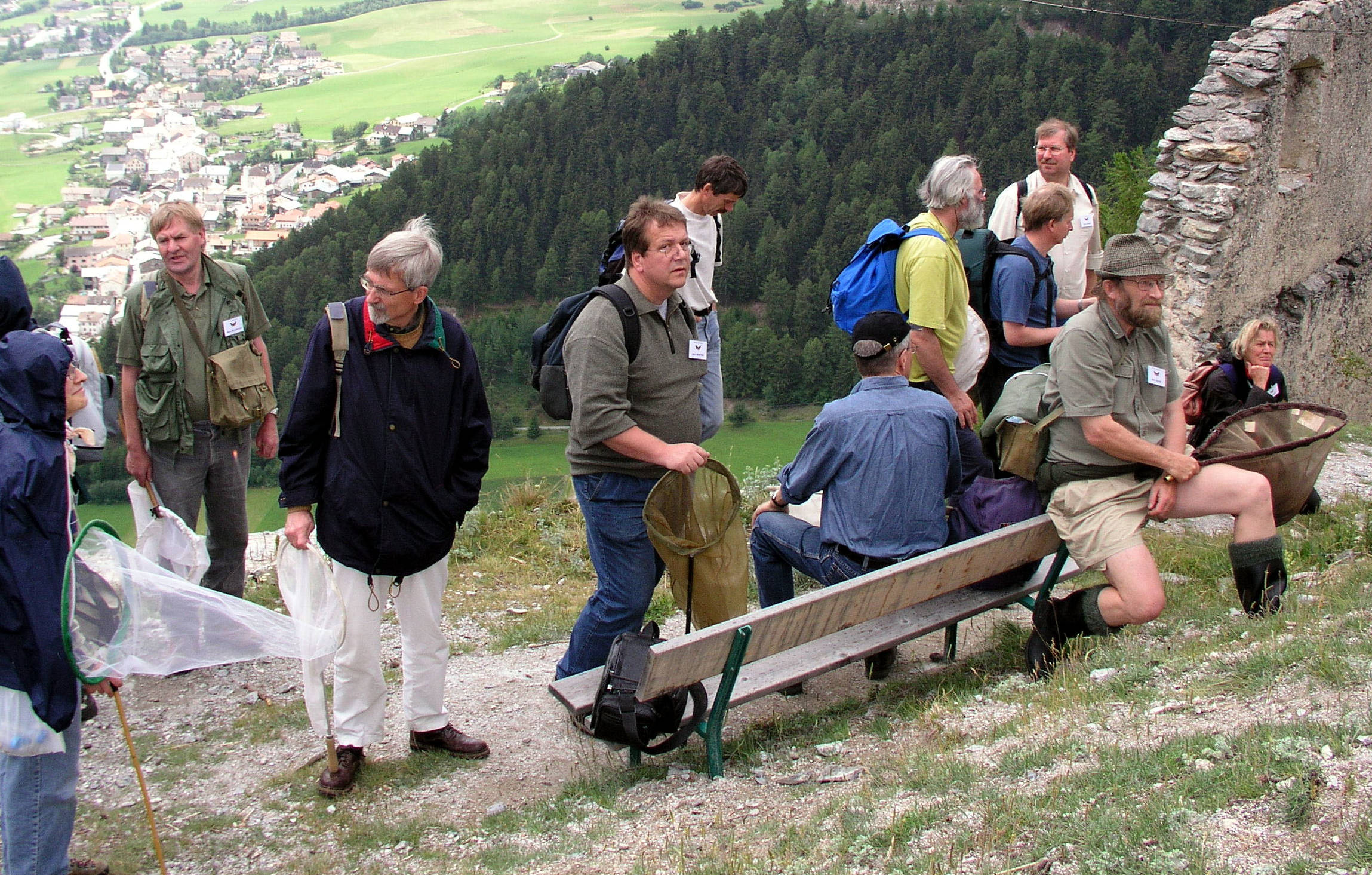
SEL members on Field Congress in South Tyrol in 2004

SEL promotes research in lepidopterology, and dissemination of the findings primarily at the biennial European Congresses of Lepidopterology and through the publication of the scientific journal Nota Lepidopterologica. A newsletter, SELepidoptera News, published once to twice a year in irregular intervals, serves the society as outlet for news, announcements and reports from General Meetings of the SEL Council.

The society was founded by Otakar Kudrna, with Rienk de Jong as its first president. The current president is Jadranka Rota.

Over the 50 years since the society's foundation, six people served as SEL president:

- Rienk de Jong: 1976–1986
- Emilio Balletto: 1986–1998
- Niels Peder Kristensen: 1998–2007
- Gerhard Tarmann: 2007–2015
- Erik van Nieukerken: 2015–2023
- Jadranka Rota: since 2023

== Conferences ==
Conferences are held every two years in different countries of Europe, with locations alternating between Western and Eastern Europe. After 2002, the biennial conferences were moved to odd years to avoid overlap with the International Congress of Entomology, which takes place in even years. Due to the global COVID-19 pandemic, the 2021 congress was postponed to 2022.

- 1st SEL Congress 1978 in Paris, France
- 2nd SEL Congress 1980 in Karlsruhe, Germany
- 3rd SEL Congress 13–16 April 1982 in Cambridge, Great Britain
- 4th SEL Congress 24–27 April 1984 in Wageningen, the Netherlands
- 5th SEL Congress 7–10 April 1986 in Budapest, Hungary
- 6th SEL Congress 5–9 April 1988 in Sanremo, Italy
- 7th SEL Congress 3–8 September 1990 in Lunz am See, Austria
- 8th SEL Congress 19–23 April 1992 in Helsinki, Finland
- 9th SEL Congress 5–9 September 1994 in Lednice, Czech Republic
- 10th SEL Congress 3–7 May 1996 in Miraflores de la Sierra, Spain
- 11th SEL Congress 22–26 March 1998 in Malle, Belgium
- 12th SEL Congress 2000 in Białowieża, Poland
- 13th SEL Congress 1–6 June 2002 in Korsør, Denmark
- 14th SEL Congress 12–17 September 2005 in Rome, Italy
- 15th SEL Congress 8–12 September 2007 in Erkner, Germany
- 16th SEL Congress 25–31 May 2009 in Cluj-Napoca, Romania
- 17th SEL Congress 9–13 May 2011 in Luxembourg City, Luxembourg
- 18th SEL Congress 29 July–4 August 2013 in Blagoevgrad, Bulgaria
- 19th SEL Congress 27 September–2 October 2015 in Radebeul, Germany
- 20th SEL Congress 24–30 April 2017 in Podgora, Croatia
- 21st SEL Congress 3–7 June 2019 in Campobasso, Italy
- 22nd SEL Congress 6–11 June 2022 in Laulasmaa, Estonia
- 23rd SEL Congress 25–29 September 2023 in Orléans, France
- 24th SEL Congress 18–23 August 2025 in Svatý Jan pod Skalou, Czech Republic
- 25th SEL Congress in August 2027 in Lund, Sweden

Past (red) and future (green) locations of SEL Congresses.

The next SEL congress will take place from 18 to 23 August 2025 in the Czech village of Svatý Jan pod Skalou, southeast of Prague.
