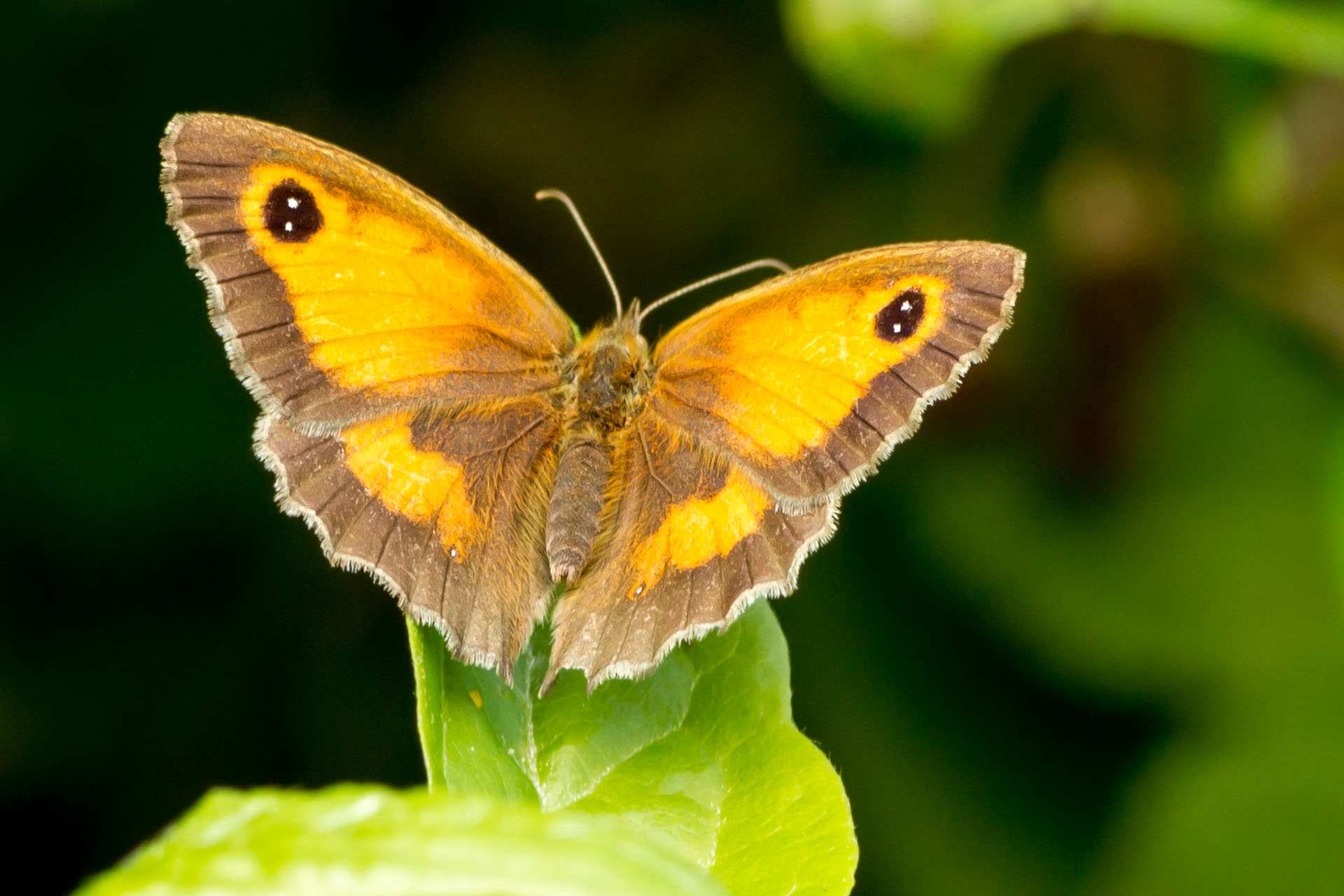
- Gatekeeper (Pyronia tithonus)

Scientific classification
- Kingdom: Animalia
- Phylum: Arthropoda
- Clade: Pancrustacea
- Class: Insecta
- Order: Lepidoptera
- Family: Nymphalidae
- Subfamily: Satyrinae
- Tribe: Satyrini
- Subtribe: Maniolina
- Genus: Pyronia; Hübner, 1819

Diversity
- Five species

Synonyms
- Idata de Lesse, 1952; Pasiphana de Lesse, 1952

= Pyronia =

Genus of butterflies

Pyronia is a genus of butterflies from the subfamily Satyrinae in the family Nymphalidae.

== Description ==
These butterflies have vestigial forelegs that cannot be used for walking. Male forelegs exhibit two tarsal joints, while female forelegs have four.

== Species ==
Listed alphabetically:

- Pyronia bathseba (Fabricius, 1793) – Spanish gatekeeper (Morocco, Algeria, southwest Europe)
- Pyronia cecilia (Vallantin, 1894) – southern gatekeeper (Morocco, southern Europe, Asia Minor)
- Pyronia janiroides (Herrich-Schäffer, [1851]) – false meadow brown (Algeria, Tunisia)
- Pyronia tithonus (Linnaeus, 1771) – gatekeeper or hedge brown (Europe, Asia Minor, Caucasus, Morocco)
