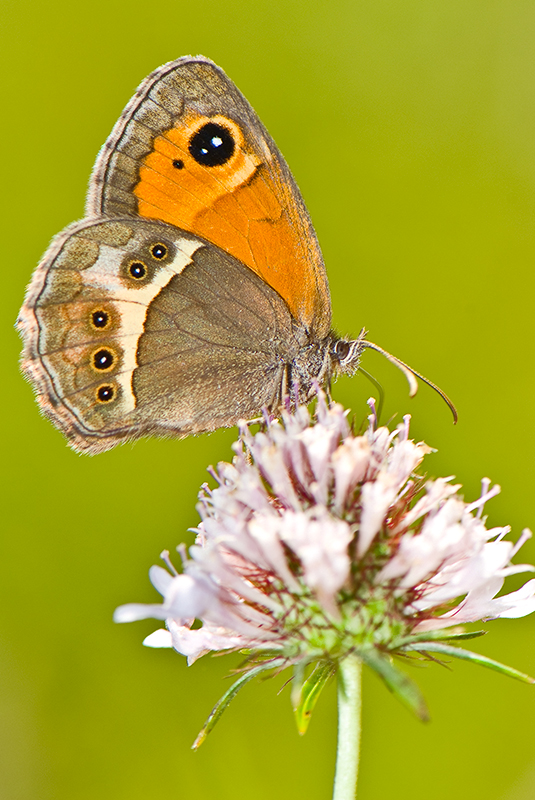

Scientific classification
- Domain: Eukaryota
- Kingdom: Animalia
- Phylum: Arthropoda
- Class: Insecta
- Order: Lepidoptera
- Family: Nymphalidae
- Genus: Pyronia
- Species: P. bathseba

Binomial name
- Pyronia bathseba (Fabricius, 1793)
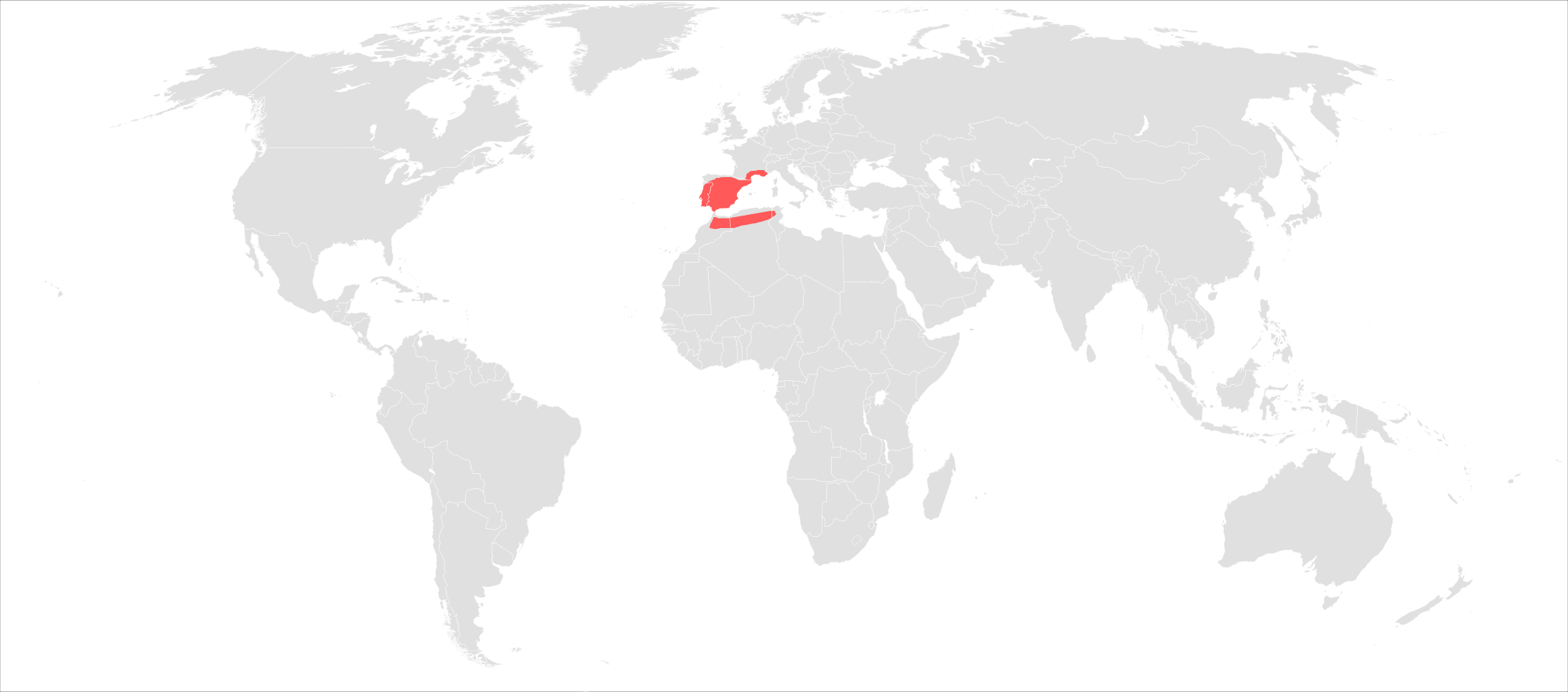

Synonyms
- Papilio bathseba; Papilio pasiphae; Epinephele pasiphae; Maniola bathseba

= Pyronia bathseba =

Spanish gatekeeper

Species of butterfly

Pyronia bathseba, the Spanish gatekeeper, is a butterfly of the family Nymphalidae. It is found on the Iberian Peninsula and in France, Morocco, and Algeria. A similar gatekeeper species is Pyronia tithonus, which is found in northern Europe.

== Description ==
The wingspan is 18–19 mm. The butterfly is on wing from May to July depending on the location.

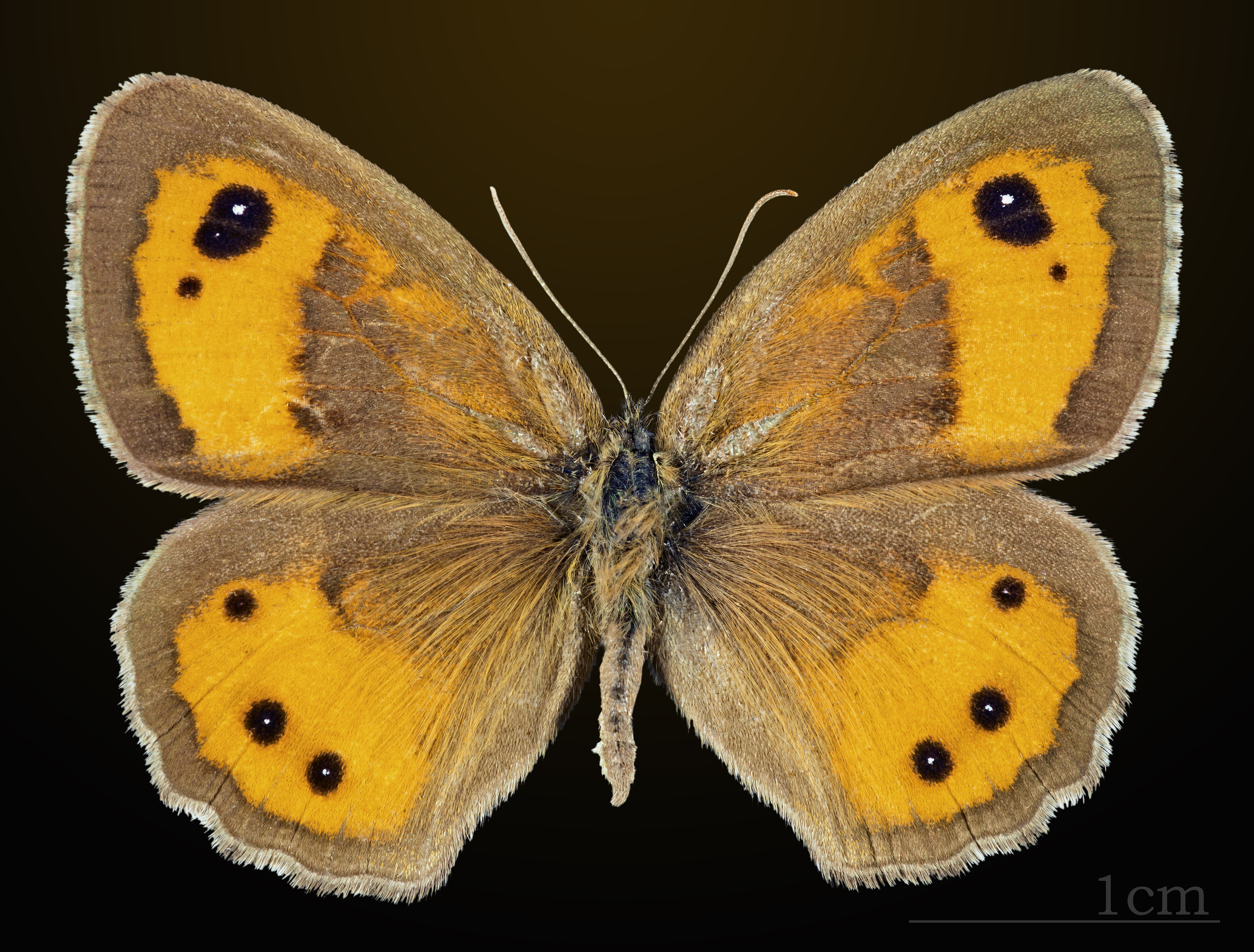
Male

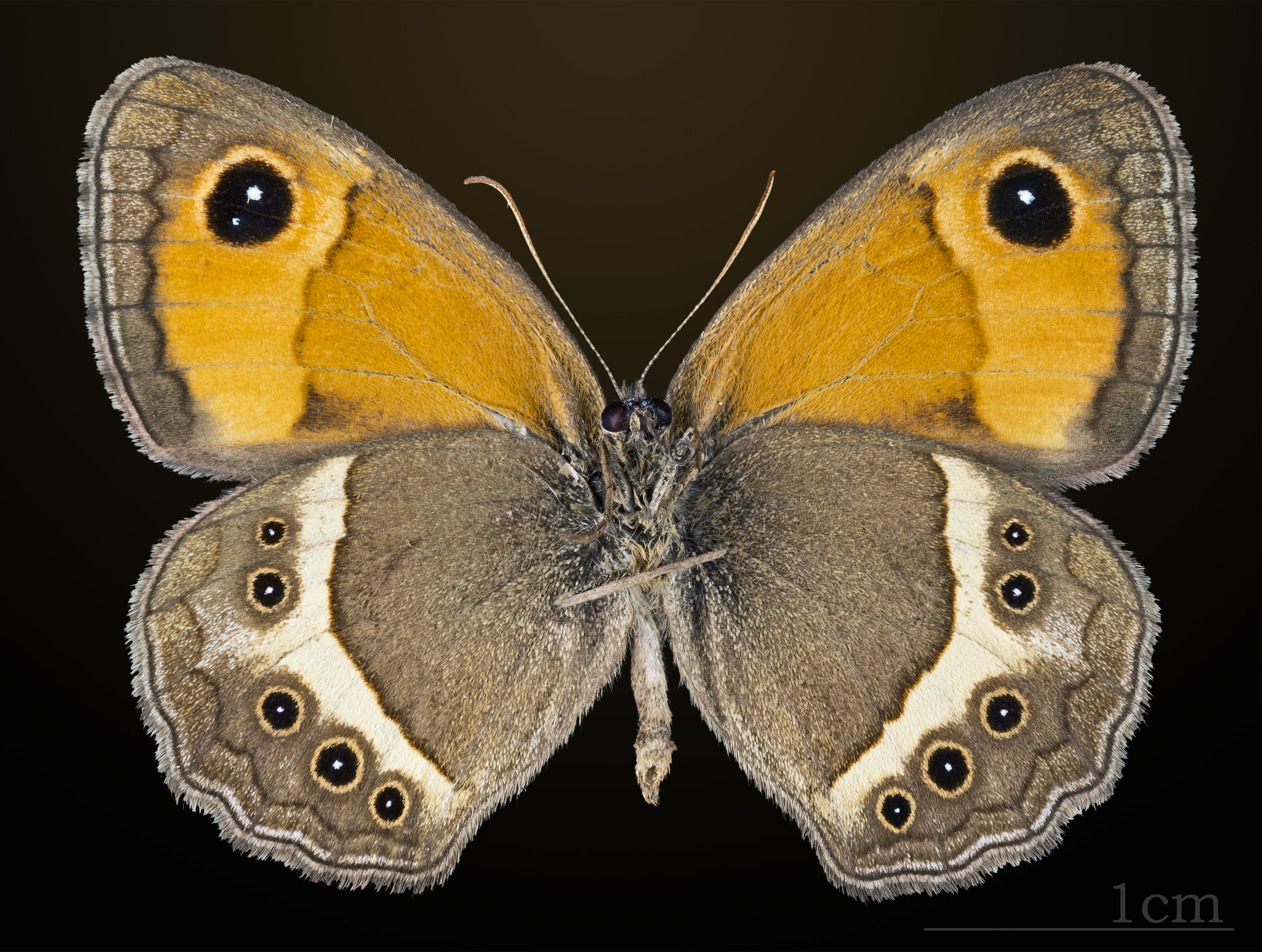
Male underside

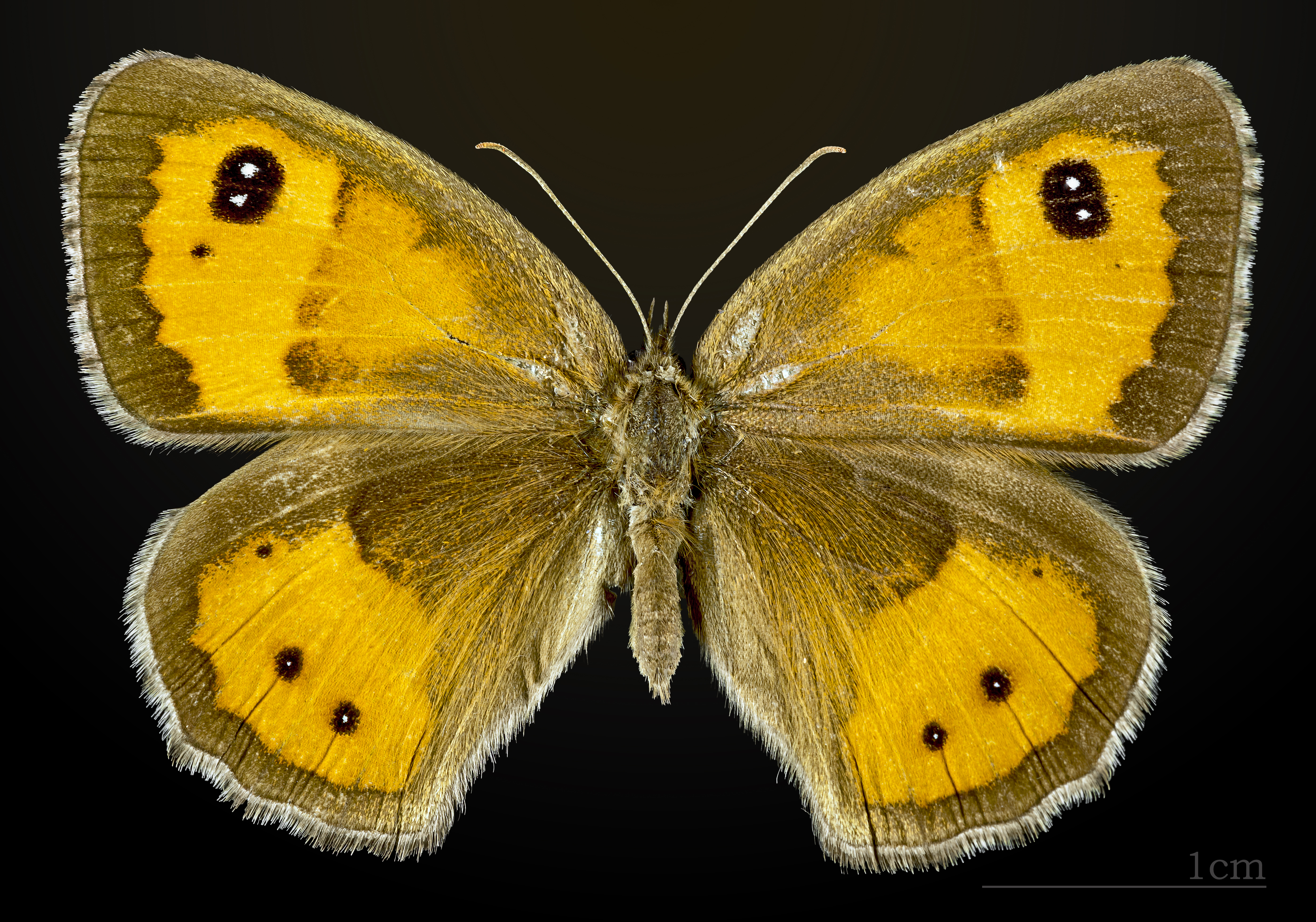
Female

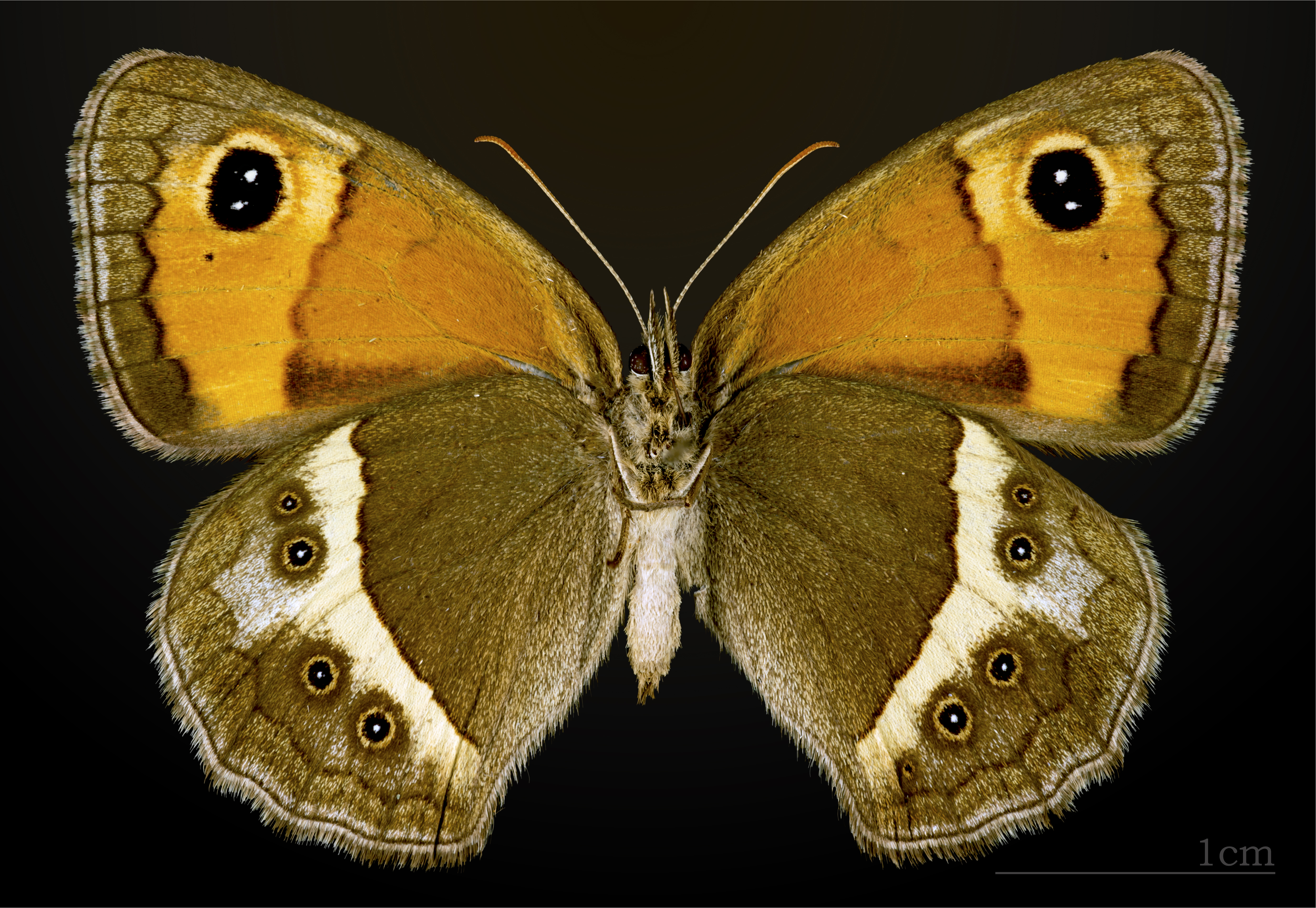
Female underside

== Biology ==
The larvae feed on Poaceae species, mainly Brachypodium species.
