= The Journal of Research on the Lepidoptera =

Journal about butterflies and moths

The Journal of Research on the Lepidoptera was a journal that published scientific articles on Lepidoptera from 1962 to 2017, publishing a total 49 volumes.

== Details ==
The journal was published by the Lepidoptera Research Foundation of California, founded by Bill (William) Hovanitz. After the journal ended production, the complete contents of the journal were published by the Biodiversity Heritage Library. However, from 2018 to 2022 the journal was hijacked and 262 fraudulent papers were published with its ISSN.
