= Ruggero Verity =

Anglo-Italian physician and entomologist

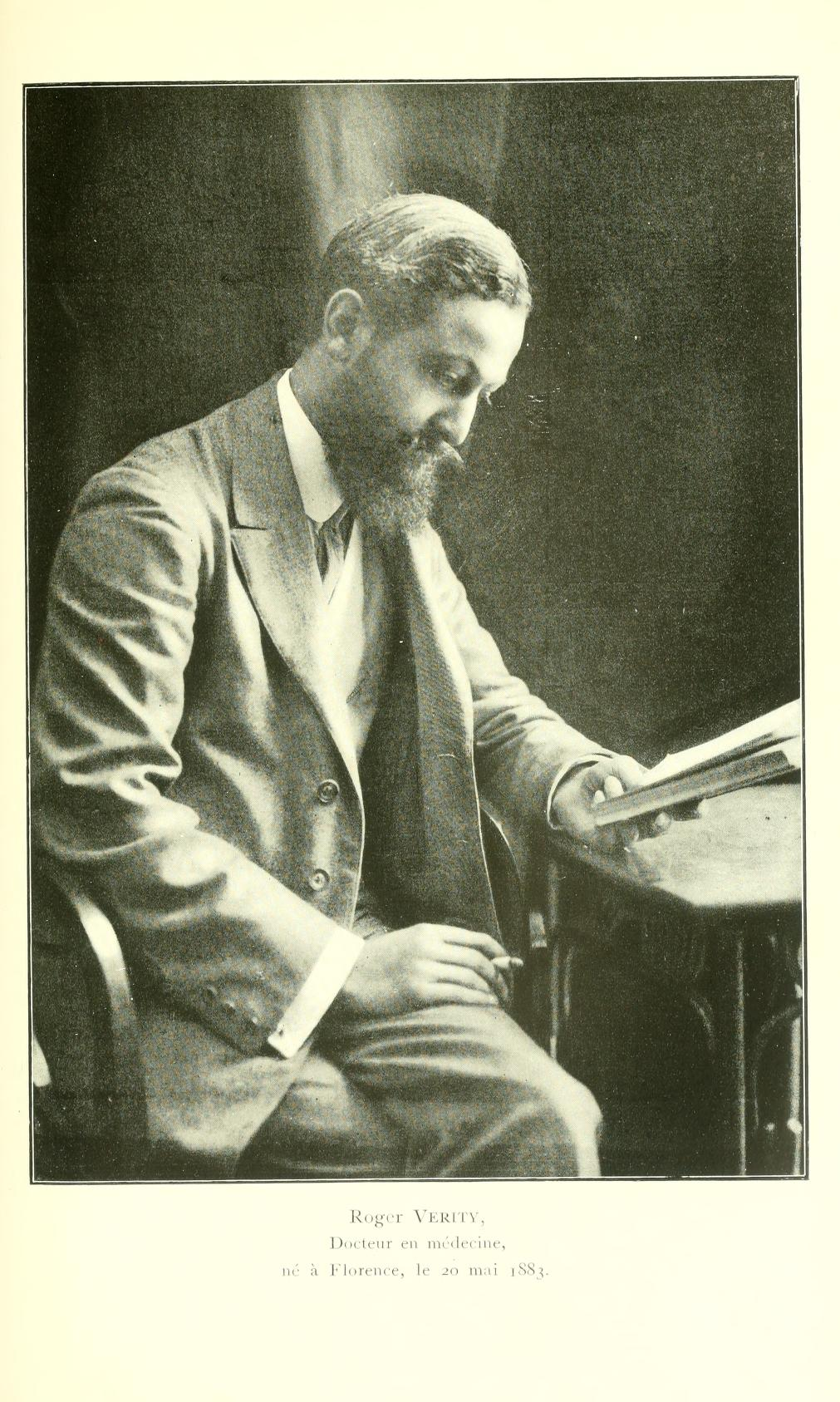
Roger Verity

Ruggero Verity or Roger Verity (20 May 1883 – 4 March 1959) was an Anglo-Italian entomologist who specialised in butterflies, and was a physician.

== Life ==
Roger Verity was born in Florence on 20 May 1883, the elder son of Richard Henry Manners Verity (1844–1926) and his wife Matilda daughter of Cav. Sebastiano Fenzi and Emily Verity. Roger Verity married, on 1 June 1922, Donna Giulia dei Principi Gallarati–Scotti (20 November 1887 – 17 June 1938) daughter of Don Gian Carlo, Prince di Molfetta, Duca di San Pietro in Galatina, and Luigia Melzi D'Eril dei Duchi di Lodi.

Roger Verity was a lepidopterist and the author of over 150 papers and books including Rhopalocera Palaeartica. Papilionidae and Pieridae (1905–1911, 454 pages), Le Farfalle diurne d’Italia (Butterflies of Italy (volumes, 1940–1953, 1688 pages) and Les variations géographiques et saisonnières des Papillons diurnes en France (Geographic and seasonal variation of the butterflies of France) (three volumes, 476 pages). He was responsible for the naming of two to three thousand butterflies, his collection of close to 250,000 butterflies many purchased from the dealerships "Staudinger Bang-Haas" and Orazio Querci together with his library is now in La Specola museum in Florence.

He lived in Florence and at "Cicaleto" (Villa Verity) at Caldine, he died 4 March 1959 and is buried at Sofiana. There is a memorial in the family chapel at Cicaleto.

Roger Verity created the term "exerges", writing: "[Exerges] always inhabit different land-areas, except in particular cases, such as large mountain chains and plains, which afford very different surroundings and climates within the same area; they often consist in a long chain of races stretching even from one continent to another ..." The modern term is cline.

== Sources ==
- Cesare Conci et Roberto Poggi (1996), Iconography of Italian Entomologists, With Essential Biographical Data. Memorie della Società entomologica Italiana, 75: 159–382
