= Orazio Querci =

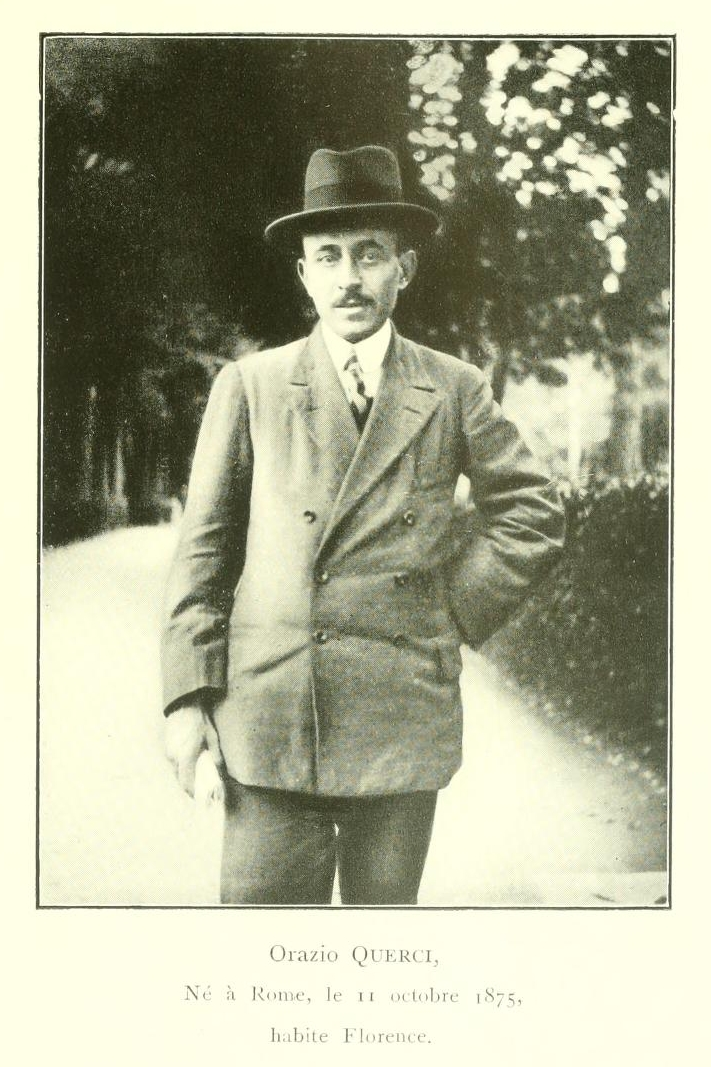
Oscar (Orazio) Querci

Orazio Querci (1875, Rome –1970) was an Italian entomologist mainly interested in butterflies. Querci established a butterfly dealership in Florence.

He supplied World butterflies to many museums including the Natural History Museum, London, the Museum of Philadelphia (via R.C. Williams), the Museum of Barcelona and the Bocage Museum (National Museum of Natural History), Lisbon, Portugal . The Museo Civico di Zoologia holds a collection of Apennine Lepidoptera (" Querci-Romei" collection) and the Zoological Museum of the Sapienza University of Rome holds further specimens. Querci also supplied European butterflies to Roger Verity. Orazio Querci collected extensively in Spain and Portugal also in Cuba.

== Works ==
- Verity, R. & Querci, O. (1923): An annotated list of the races and seasonal polymorphism of the Grypocera and of the Rhopalocera of Peninsular Italy. Ent. Rec. 35 (Supplement)
