= List of butterflies of Vanuatu =

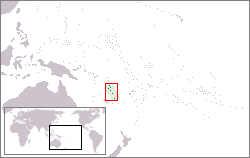
Location of Vanuatu

This is a list of butterflies of Vanuatu.

== Hesperiidae ==
=== Coeliadinae ===
- Badamia exclamationis (Fabricius, 1775)
- Badamia atrox flava Evans, 1934
- Hasora chromus bilunata (Butler, 1883)

=== Hesperiinae ===
- Borbo cinnara (Wallace & Moore, 1866)
- Pelopidas lyelli mathewi (Evans, 1937)

== Papilionidae ==
=== Papilioninae ===
- Papilio fuscus nomus Gabriel, 1936
- Papilio fuscus hypsicles (Hewitson, 1868)
- Papilio fuscus burgessi (Samson, 1982)

== Pieridae ==
=== Coliadinae ===
- Catopsilia pomona (Fabricius, 1775)
- Catopsilia pyranthe lactea (Butler, 1870)
- Catopsilia scylla gorgophone (Boisduval, 1836)
- Eurema hecabe sulphurata (Butler, 1875)

=== Pierinae ===
- Appias athama athama (Blanchard, 1848)
- Appias paulina ega (Boisduval, 1836)
- Cepora perimale jeanneli Viette, 1950
- Pieris rapae (Linnaeus, 1758)
- Belenois java peristhene (Boisduval, 1859)
- Delias nysa santo Talbot, 1937

== Lycaenidae ==
=== Theclinae ===
- Deudorix mathewi mathewi Druce, 1892
- Deudorix mathewi naruai Tennent, 2003

=== Polyommatinae ===
- Petrelaea tombugensis (Röber, 1886)
- Nacaduba novaehebridensis nubilus Tennent, 2003
- Nacaduba novaehebridensis novaehebridensis Druce, 1892
- Nacaduba dyopa lepidus (Tennent, 2000)
- Nacaduba kurava euretes (Druce, 1891)
- Nacaduba biocellata armillata (Butler, 1875)
- Nacaduba mallicollo mallicollo Druce, 1892
- Nacaduba samsoni Tennent, 2001
- Prosotas patricae Tennent, 2003
- Catopyrops nebulosa nebulosa (Druce, 1892)
- Catopyrops nebulosa opacus Tennent, 2003
- Jamides goodenovii (Butler, 1876)
- Jamides pulcherrima Butler, 1884
- Jamides kava Druce, 1892
- Jamides morphoides Butler, 1884
- Jamides carissima carissima (Butler, 1875)
- Jamides celeno evanescens (Butler, 1875)
- Jamides celeno niger Tennent, 2003
- Catochrysops panormus caerulea Tite, 1959
- Catochrysops taitensis taitensis (Boisduval, 1832)
- Lampides boeticus (Linnaeus, 1767)
- Famegana alsulus alsulus (Herrich-Schaeffer, 1869)
- Leptotes plinius pseudocassius (Murray, 1873)
- Zizina labradus caduca (Butler, 1875)
- Zizula hylax dampierensis (Rothschild, 1915)
- Everes lacturnus palliensis (Ribbe, 1899)
- Euchrysops cnejus cnidus Waterhouse and Lyell, 1914
- Luthrodes cleotas excellens (Butler, 1875)

== Nymphalidae ==
=== Danainae ===
- Parantica pumila samsoni Ackery, Taylor & Renevier, 1989
- Parantica pumila hebridesia (Butler, 1875)
- Tirumala hamata moderata (Butler, 1875)
- Danaus affinis atchinii Tennent, 2003
- Danaus petilia (Stoll, 1790)
- Danaus plexippus plexippus (Linnaeus, 1758)
- Euploea sylvester tristis (Butler, 1866)
- Euploea leucostictos iphianassa (Butler, 1866)
- Euploea leucostictos novarumebudum (Carpenter, 1942)
- Euploea tulliolus forsteri (C & R Felder, 1865)
- Euploea boisduvalii torvina (Butler, 1875)
- Euploea boisduvalii bakeri (Poulton, 1927)
- Euploea lewinii lilybaea (Fruhstorfer, 1911)
- Euploea treitschkei jessica (Butler, 1869)

=== Satyrinae ===
- Mycalesis perseus lugens (Butler, 1875)
- Orsotriaena medus mutata (Butler, 1875)
- Melanitis leda solandra (Fabricius, 1775)
- Melanitis amabilis amabilis (Boisduval, 1832)

=== Charaxinae ===
- Polyura sacco santoensis Lachlan, 1993
- Polyura sacco sacco Smart, 1977

=== Limenitidinae ===
- Parthenos sylvia thesaurinus Grose Smith, 1897

=== Nymphalinae ===
- Doleschallia browni herrichii (Butler 1875)
- Hypolimnas antilope shortlandica (Ribbe, 1898)
- Hypolimnas pithoeka impostor Tennent, 2002
- Hypolimnas octocula octocula (Butler, 1869)
- Hypolimnas octocula perryi (Butler, 1875)
- Hypolimnas octocula tanna Samson, 1986
- Hypolimnas octocula futunaensis Samson, 1986
- Hypolimnas octocula bellus Tennent, 2003
- Hypolimnas bolina nerina (Fabricius, 1775)
- Hypolimnas misippus (Linnaeus, 1764)
- Yoma sabina sabina (Cramer, [1780])
- Junonia villida villida (Fabricius, 1787)

=== Heliconiinae ===
- Vagrans egista hebridina (Waterhouse, 1920)
- Vagrans egista samsoni Tennent, 2003

=== Acraeinae ===
- Acraea andromacha andromacha (Fabricius, 1775)
