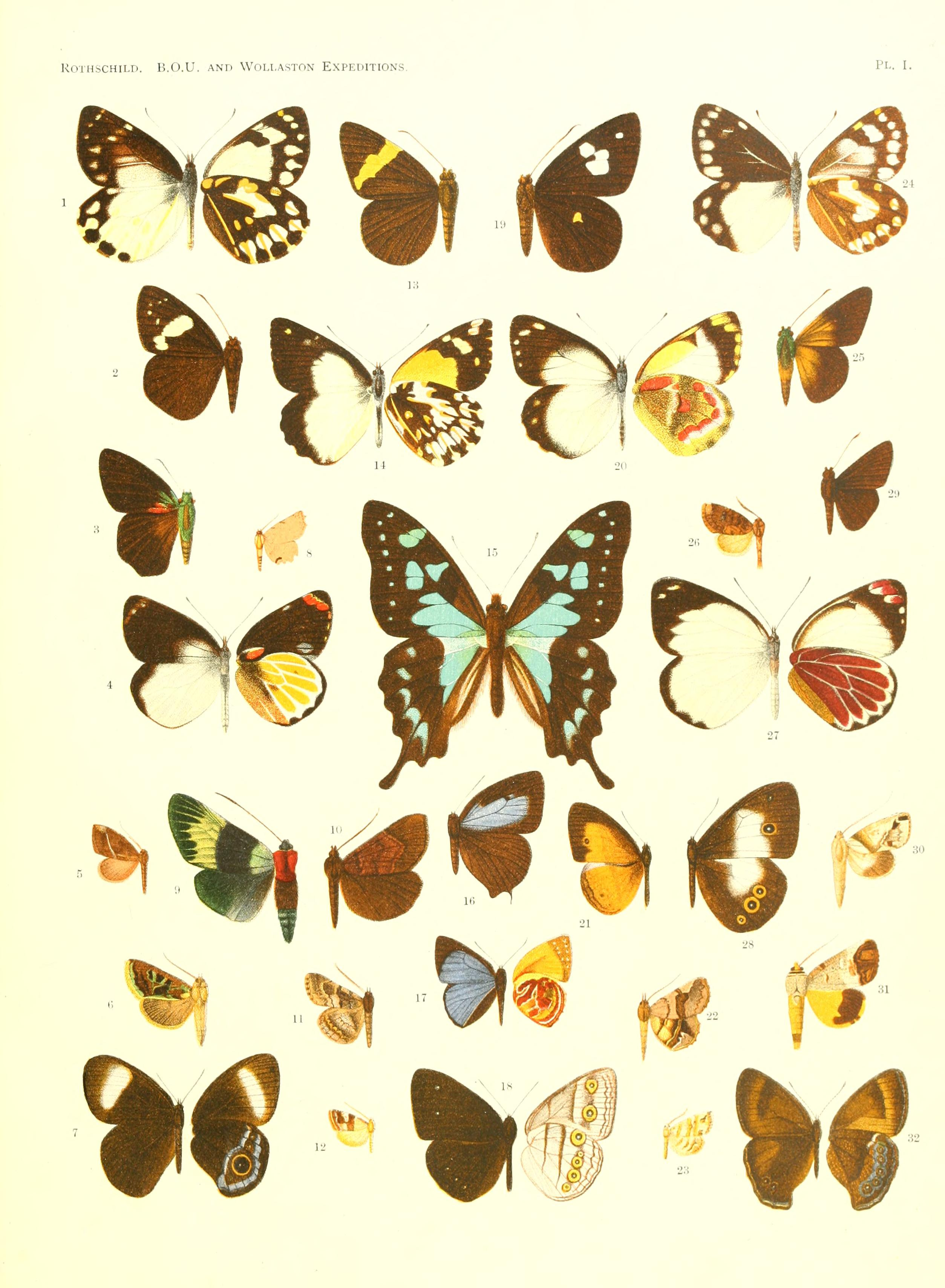

Conservation status
- Vulnerable (IUCN 2.3)

Scientific classification
- Kingdom: Animalia
- Phylum: Arthropoda
- Clade: Pancrustacea
- Class: Insecta
- Order: Lepidoptera
- Family: Papilionidae
- Genus: Graphium
- Species: G. stresemanni

Binomial name
- Graphium stresemanni Rothschild, 1916

= Graphium stresemanni =

Species of butterfly

Graphium stresemanni is a vulnerable species of butterfly in the family Papilionidae. It is endemic to the Indonesian island of Seram. It closely resembles the related Graphium weiskei, a more common species from New Guinea but has been treated as a distinct species. It is rare. The species was first described by Walter Rothschild in 1916.

== Taxonomy ==
Graphium batjanensis described by Okano in 1984 appears to be allopatric to G. stresemanni and a different species. It has also been suggested to be conspecific with G. weiskei.

== Sources ==
- Collins, N. Mark; Morris, Michael G. (1985). Threatened Swallowtail Butterflies of the World: The IUCN Red Data Book. Gland & Cambridge: IUCN. ISBN 978-2-88032-603-6 – via Biodiversity Heritage Library.
- Müller, C. J. & Tennent, W. J. (1999). "A New Species of Graphium Scopoli (Lepidoptera: Papilionidae) from the Bismarck Archipelago, Papua New Guinea 1999". Records of the Australian Museum. 51: 161-168. Presents a key to the closely related Graphium kosii, Graphium weiskei (Ribbe), G. stresemanni (Rothschild), G. batjanensis Okano (see note), G. macleayanum (Leach) and G. gelon (Boisduval) all of which are confined to the Australasian region.
- Okano, K. (1984). "On the butterflies of Graphium weiskei group (Papilionidae) with description of a new species". Tokurana (Acta Rhopalocera). 8 (1): 1-20.
- Smart, P., 1976 The Illustrated Encyclopedia of the Butterfly World Illust. Encyp. Butt. W. 123, figure 13.
