= Saruman Museum =

Former private butterfly museum in England

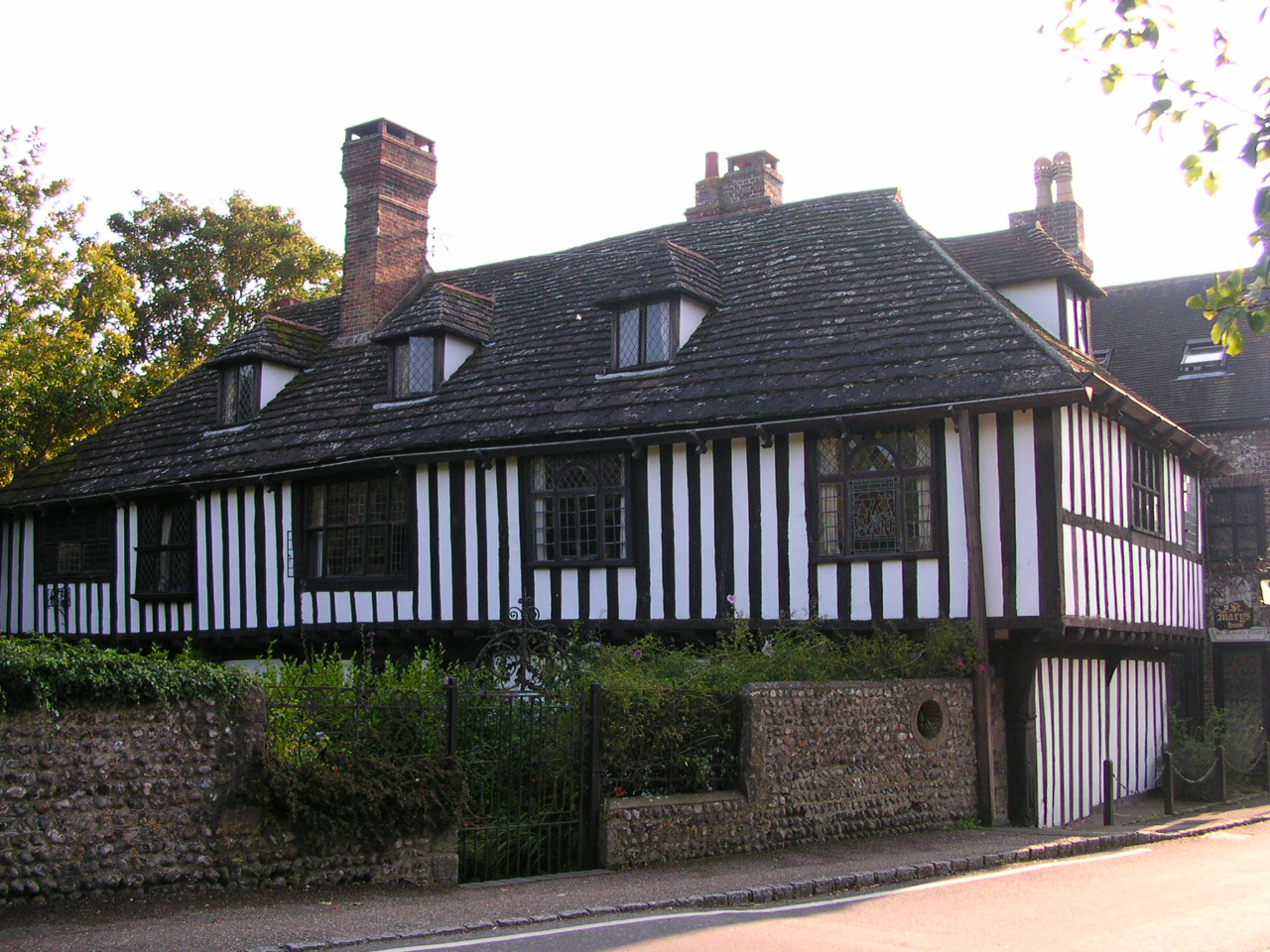
St Mary's House

The Saruman Museum was a private butterfly museum established in England in the 1970s. It was also known as the National Butterfly Museum and functioned as a natural history dealer. The founder, Paul Edgar Smart FRES (born c. 1940), a gentleman scientist, was the author of The Illustrated Encyclopedia of the Butterfly World. All two thousand specimens n this work were held by the Saruman Museum and photographed there.

The first dealership was at 58 High street Tunbridge Wells. When it became a museum, it was at St Giles in the Wood, Beckley at Rye. Around 1977 Smart bought St Mary's House at Bramber in Sussex, a 15th-century timber-framed house on a site associated with the Knights Templar.

The new Saruman Museum (named from a character in J. R. R. Tolkien's The Lord of the Rings) became known as the National Butterfly Museum. It was said that at the time, Smart had the largest collection outside of the British Museum (Natural History).

His personal collection of British butterflies and their forma and aberrations was very extensive and complete. It was housed in fine Gurney cabinets (Thomas Gurney, cabinet maker, Broadway, London Fields). Equally well known was his library which contained many rare and very rare works (he was also a book dealer). Smart also had historic specimens which had been caught by Alfred Russel Wallace and specimens caught as long ago as 1795.

The enterprise failed and the collection was sold at Christie's auction house in July 1982.

Associated with the museum were Trevor Scott FRES; Chris Samson FRES; John Muirhead FRES; magasin Deyrolles of Rue du Bac, Paris; and Henri Descimon of the Laboratoire de Zoologie de l'Ecole Normale Supérieure, Paris.

In 1979 Smart founded a short-lived journal The Aurelian named for Moses Harris's The Aurelian: Or, Natural History of English Insects (1766, 2nd ed. 1775).

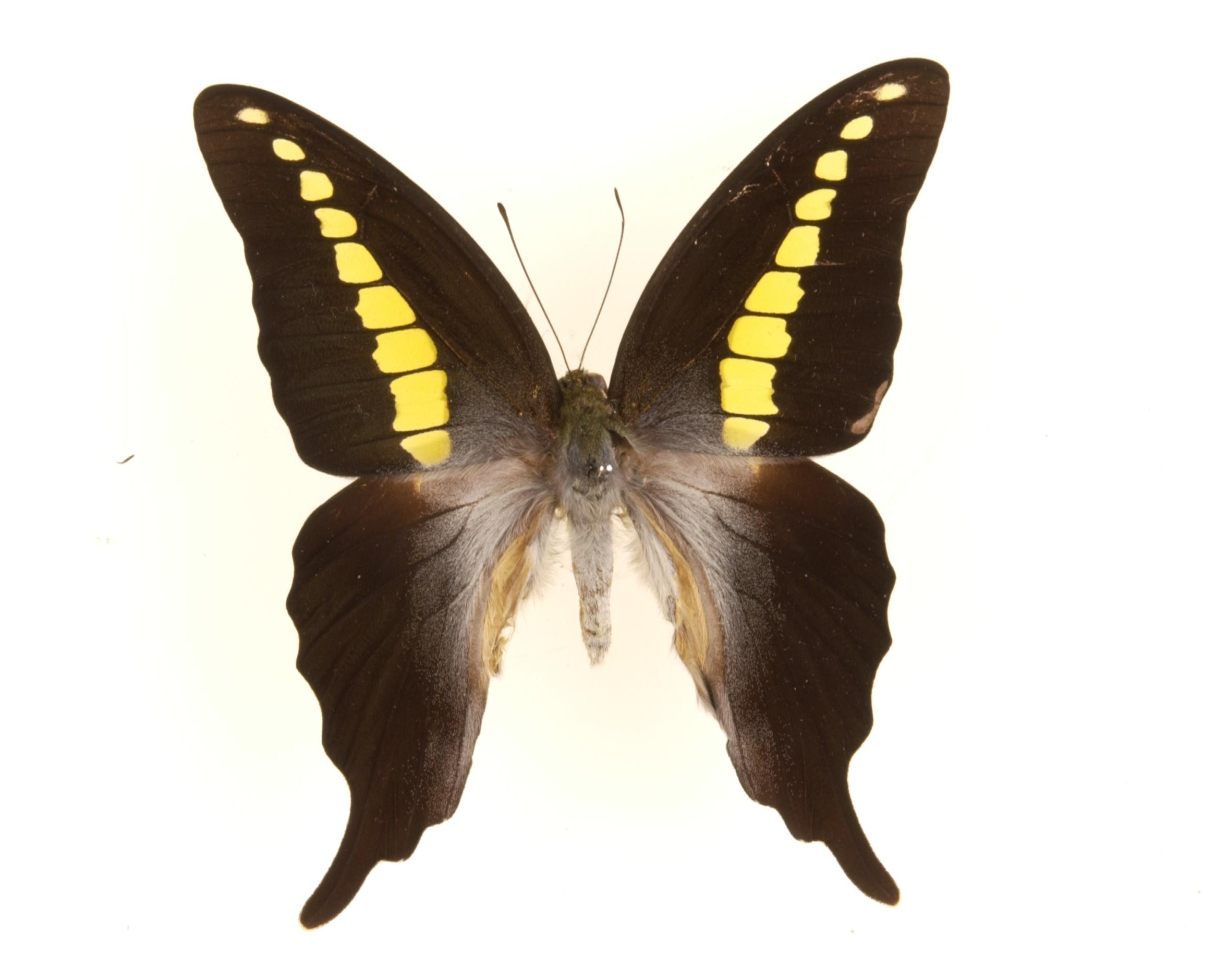
A typical beautifully set specimen of Graphium codrus now in the Ulster Museum

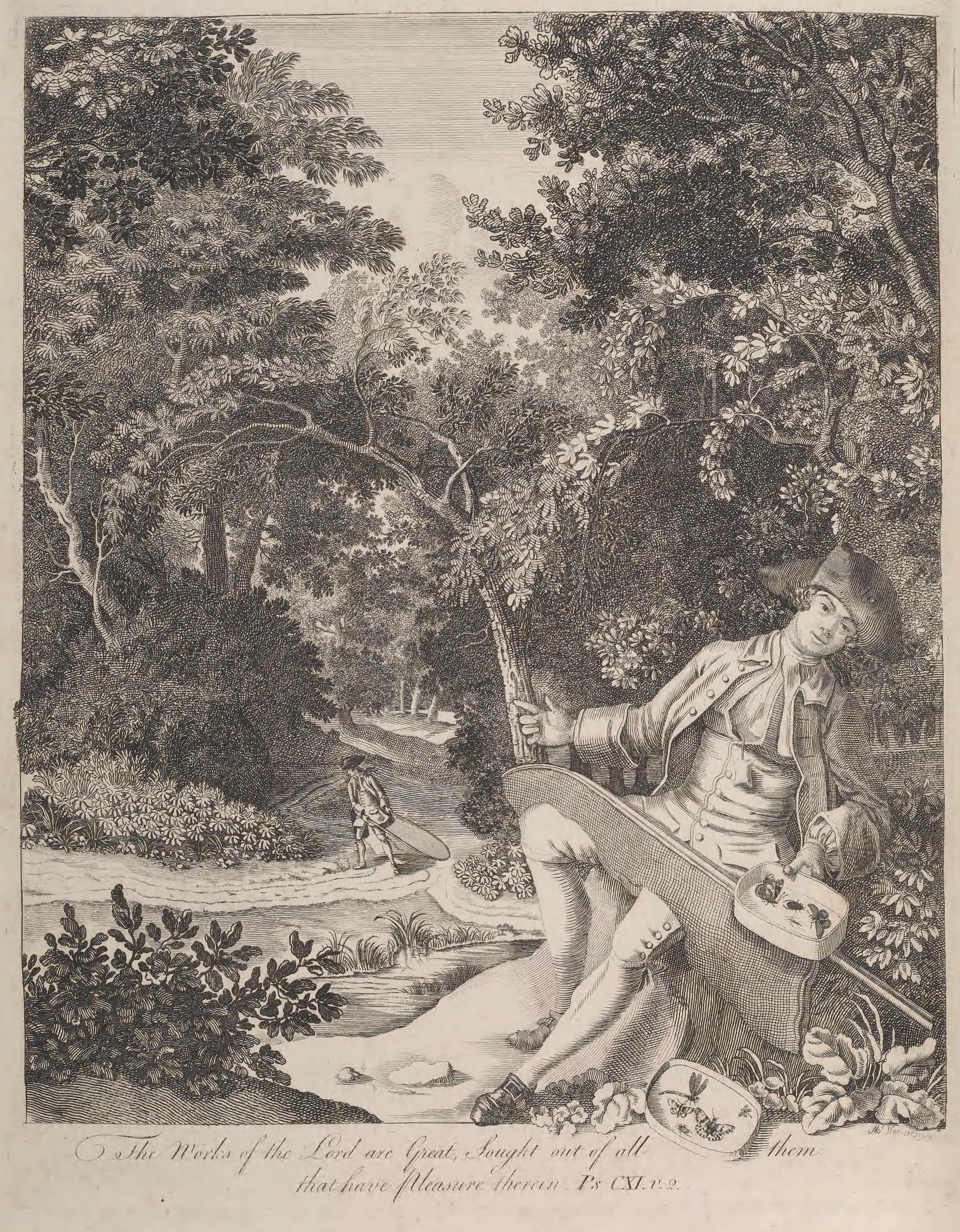
Frontispiece from The Aurelian of 1840. A typical Smart choice.

== Publications about the collection ==
- Smart, P. E. (1975). The International Butterfly Book. N.Y.: Thomas C. Crowell.
- Smart, P. (1977). "A new species of Polyura (Lep: Charaxinae) from the New Hebrides with some notes on allied species in the Australian region". Bulletin of the Amateur Entomologists' Society. 36 (315): 56–62. (about Polyura sacco).
- Smart, P. E. (1979). "A new species of Argyrogramma from Trinidad". The Aurelian. 1 (3): 9, 13.
- Samson, C. & Smart, P. (1980). "A review of the Genus Liphyra (Lepidoptera: Lycaenidae) of Indo-Australia". The Aurelian. 1 (4): 6–16, ill.
- Haugum, J. & Samson, C. (1980). "Notes on Graphium weiskei". Lepidoptera Group of 1968 Supplement. 8, 12 pp., 2 maps.
- Samson, C. (1979). "Butterflies (Lepidoptera: Rhopalocera) of the Santa Cruz group of islands, Solomon Islands". The Aurelian, Beckley, 1 (2): 1–19. (1982)
- Samson, C. (1983). "Two new subspecies of Papilio canopus from the Solomons and Vanautu". Pacific Insects. 24 (3/4): 228–231.
- Samson, C. (1984). "Butterflies (Lepidoptera: Rhopalocera) of Vanuatu". Naika: Journal of the Vanuatu Natural Science Society. 10: 2–6.
- Samson, C. A. (1986). "New subspecies of Danaus (Parantica) pumila (Lepidoptera: Danaidae) from southern Vanuatu". Naikia: Journal of the Vanuatu Natural Science Society. 13: 1–3.
- Samson, C. A. (1986). "The Hypolimnas octocula complex, with notes on H. inopinata (Lepidoptera, Nymphalidae)". Transactions of the Lepidopterological Society of Japan. 37 (1): 15–44.
- Nash, R. & Samson, C. (1990). "A Fourth Irish Specimen of the Small Mountain Ringlet Erebia epiphron Knoch (Lepidoptera)". Irish Naturalists' Journal. 23: 339.

== See also ==
- Tring Museum
- Hill Museum
