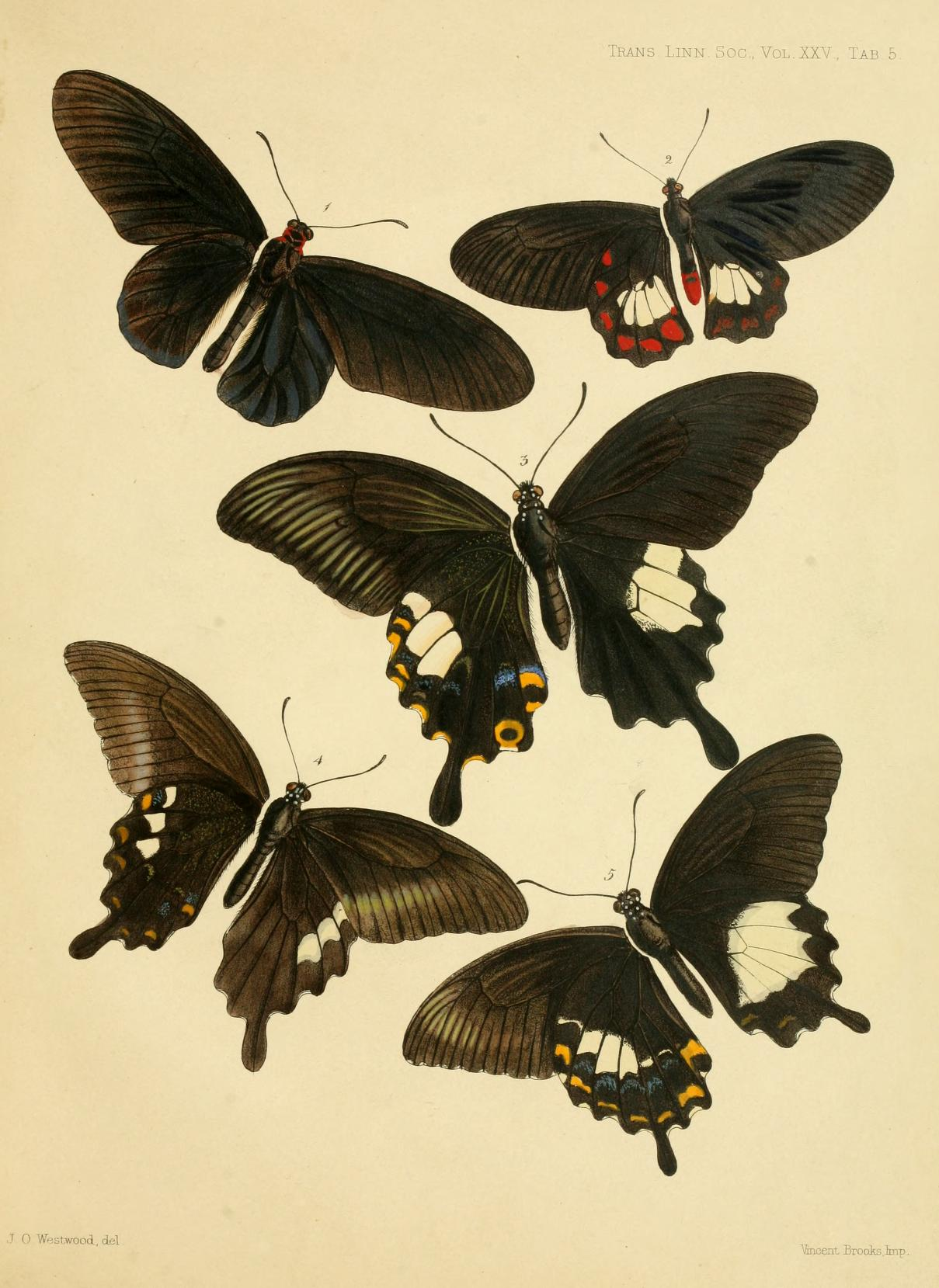
- Figure 5 from the original description

Scientific classification
- Kingdom: Animalia
- Phylum: Arthropoda
- Clade: Pancrustacea
- Class: Insecta
- Order: Lepidoptera
- Family: Papilionidae
- Genus: Papilio
- Species: P. albinus

Binomial name
- Papilio albinus Wallace, 1865

Synonyms
- Papilio leucophanes Grose-Smith, 1894; Papilio lesches Godman & Salvin, 1880; Papilio bicolor Kirby, 1887

= Papilio albinus =

Species of butterfly

Papilio albinus is a species of swallowtail butterfly from the genus Papilio that is found in west Western New Guinea and Papua New Guinea. The species was first described by Alfred Russel Wallace in 1865.

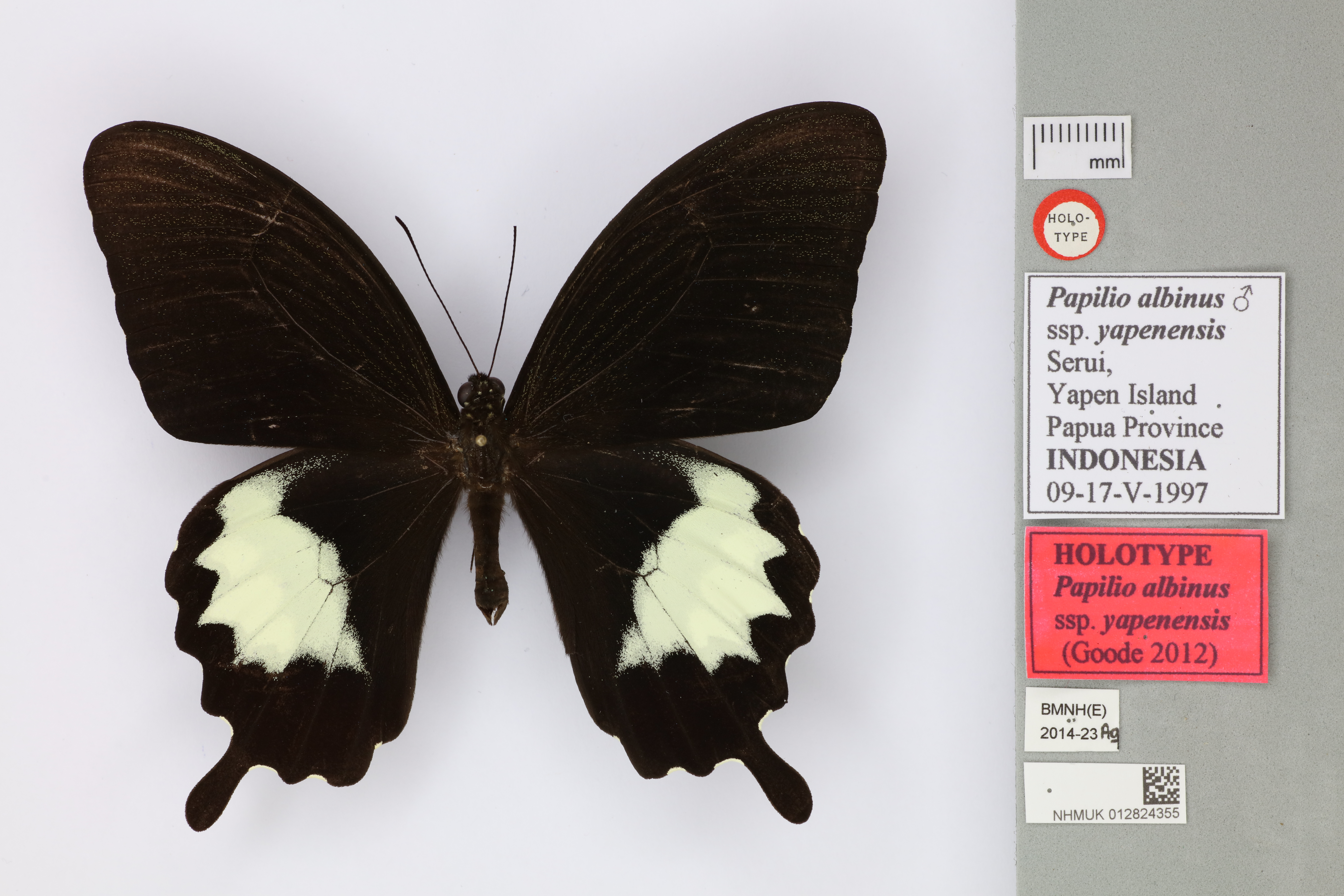
Papilio albinus yapenensis Goode 2012

== Description ==
P. albinus. Similar to P. fuscus The ground-colour in the male with almost almost pure black; the white area of the hindwing above very broad, always entering the cell, the 2. to the 4. spot distally sharply excised and produced at the veins into a pointed tooth, distally to the white area no grey-blue discal spots; beneath the white patches very sharply defined, especially distally. Female much paler than the white area of the hindwing as in the male but above mostly somewhat narrower, sometimes not reaching the cell; the hindwing beneath with a white discal band consisting of 6 or 7 patches and a complete row of dirty yellow submarginal spots. Dutch and British New Guinea, at low elevations in the hills. — albinus Wall. (= sekarensis Horn.). Forewing without white subapical band. Dutch New Guinea. In ab. leucophanes Gr.-Sm. the hindwing has only 2 white discal patches beneath. — lesches Godm. & Salv. (25 c). Forewing with white subapical band. British New Guinea. .

== Subspecies ==
- Papilio albinus albinus (West Irian)
- Papilio albinus lesches Godman & Salvin, 1880 (New Guinea)
- Papilio albinus yapenensis Goode 2012 (Yapen Island, New Guinea)
- Papilio albinus yahukimo Goode, 2012 (Papua, Yayawijaya Mountains)

== Taxonomy ==
Papilio albinus is a member of the fuscus species group. The members of this clade are

- Papilio albinus Wallace, 1865
- Papilio diophantus Grose-Smith, 1883
- Papilio fuscus Goeze, 1779
- Papilio hipponous C. Felder & R. Felder, 1862
- Papilio jordani Fruhstorfer, 1906
- Papilio pitmani Elwes & de Nicéville, [1887]
- Papilio prexaspes C. Felder & R. Felder, 1865
- Papilio sakontala Hewitson, 1864
