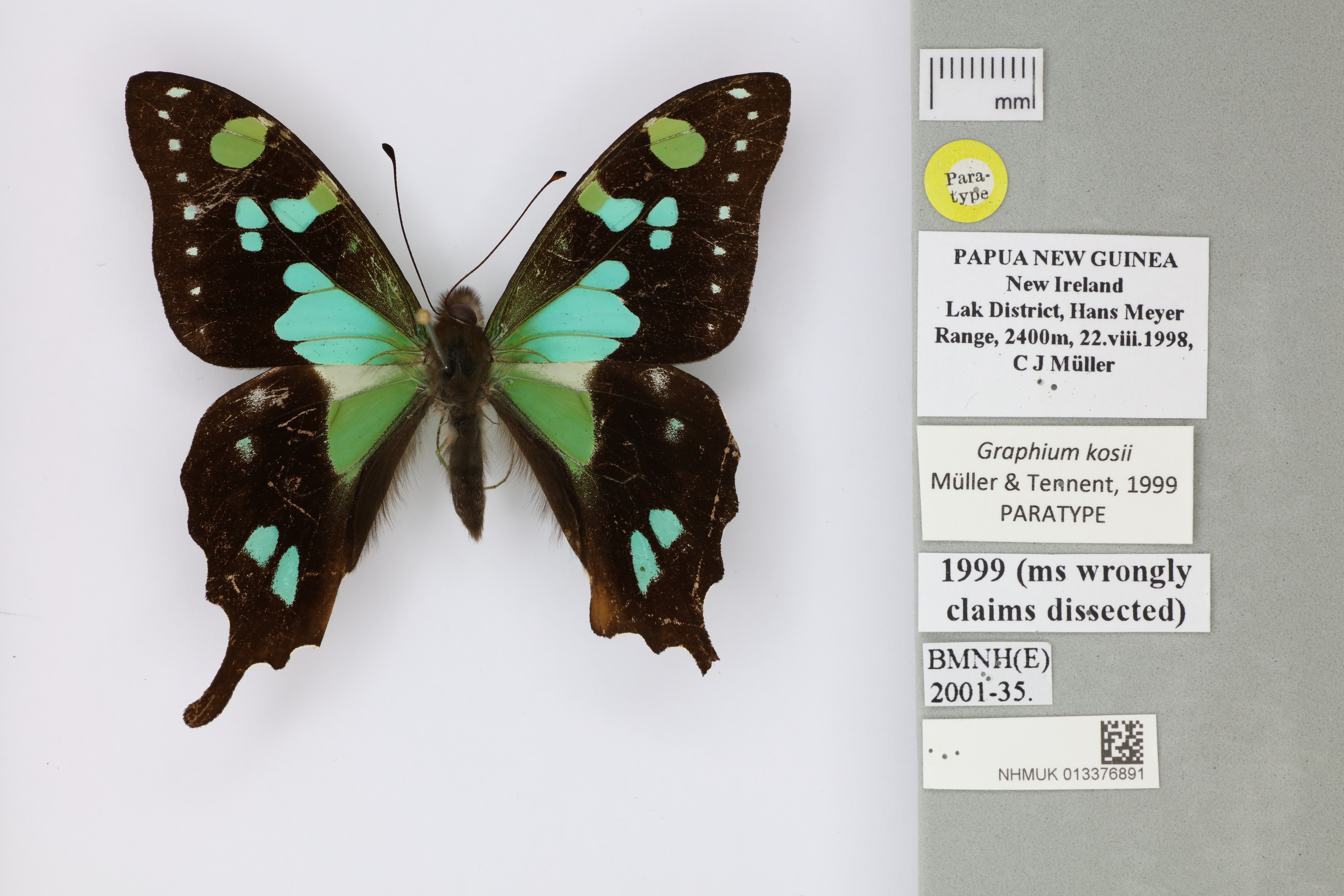
- Graphium kosii dorsum. Paratype.

Conservation status
- Near Threatened (IUCN 3.1)

Scientific classification
- Kingdom: Animalia
- Phylum: Arthropoda
- Class: Insecta
- Order: Lepidoptera
- Family: Papilionidae
- Genus: Graphium
- Species: G. kosii

Binomial name
- Graphium kosii Müller and Tennent, 1999

= Graphium kosii =

Species of butterfly

Graphium kosii is a species of butterfly found only on New Ireland in Papua New Guinea.

It may be the same species as Graphium weiskei.
