= Papilio sakontala =

Scientific classification
- Kingdom: Animalia
- Phylum: Arthropoda
- Clade: Pancrustacea
- Class: Insecta
- Order: Lepidoptera
- Family: Papilionidae
- Genus: Papilio
- Species: P. sakontala

Binomial name
- Papilio sakontala Hewitson, 1864

Species of butterfly

Papilio sakontala is a species of swallowtail butterfly from the genus Papilio that is found in India.

== Description ==
P. sakontala Hew. (32 c). Male: both wings narrower than in Papilio hipponous and Papilio polytes Forewing with narrow marginal spots and grey discal stripes, without the band of P. hipponous; hindwing with a discal band composed of separated patches more or less strongly dusted with black, in which the 4. and 5. spots are the longest; the reddish submarginal spots of the hindwing beneath are very small, some of them not developed. — A rare North Indian species, of which so far only a few specimens have been found; from Mussourie eastwards to the Naga Hills in Upper Assam.

== Taxonomy ==
The taxonomic rank of Papilio sakontala is uncertain. It is a member of the fuscus species-group. The members of this clade are

- Papilio albinus Wallace, 1865
- Papilio diophantus Grose-Smith, 1883
- Papilio fuscus Goeze, 1779
- Papilio hipponous C. & R. Felder, 1862
- Papilio jordani Fruhstorfer, 1906
- Papilio pitmani Elwes & de Nicéville, [1887]
- Papilio prexaspes C. & R. Felder, 1865
- Papilio sakontala Hewitson, 1864
