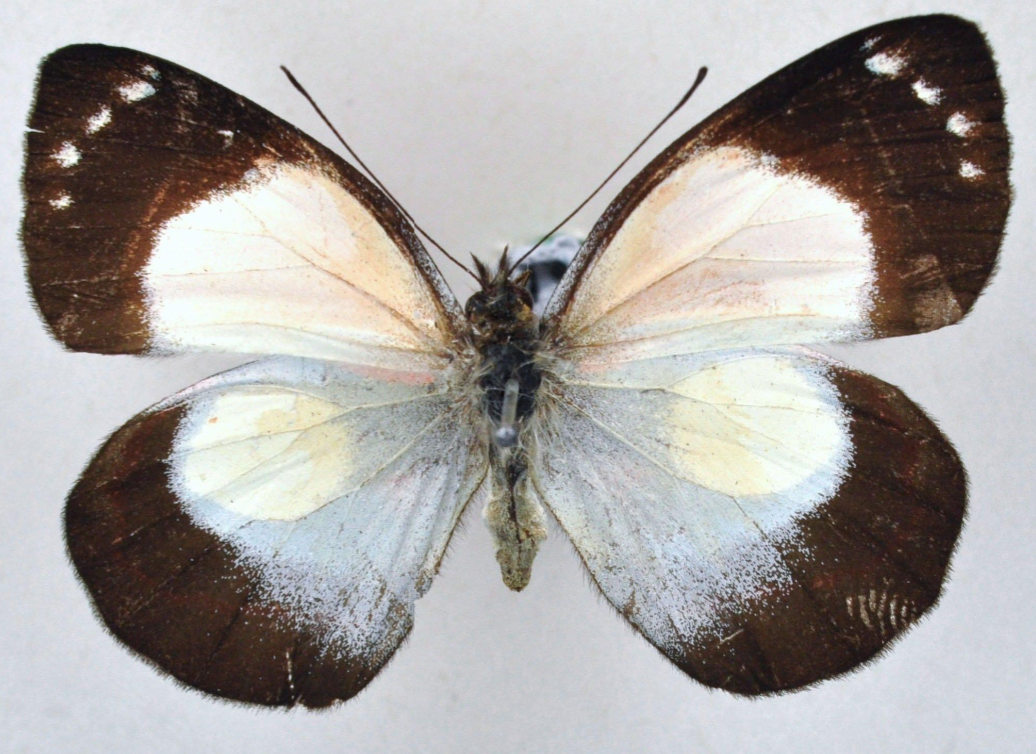

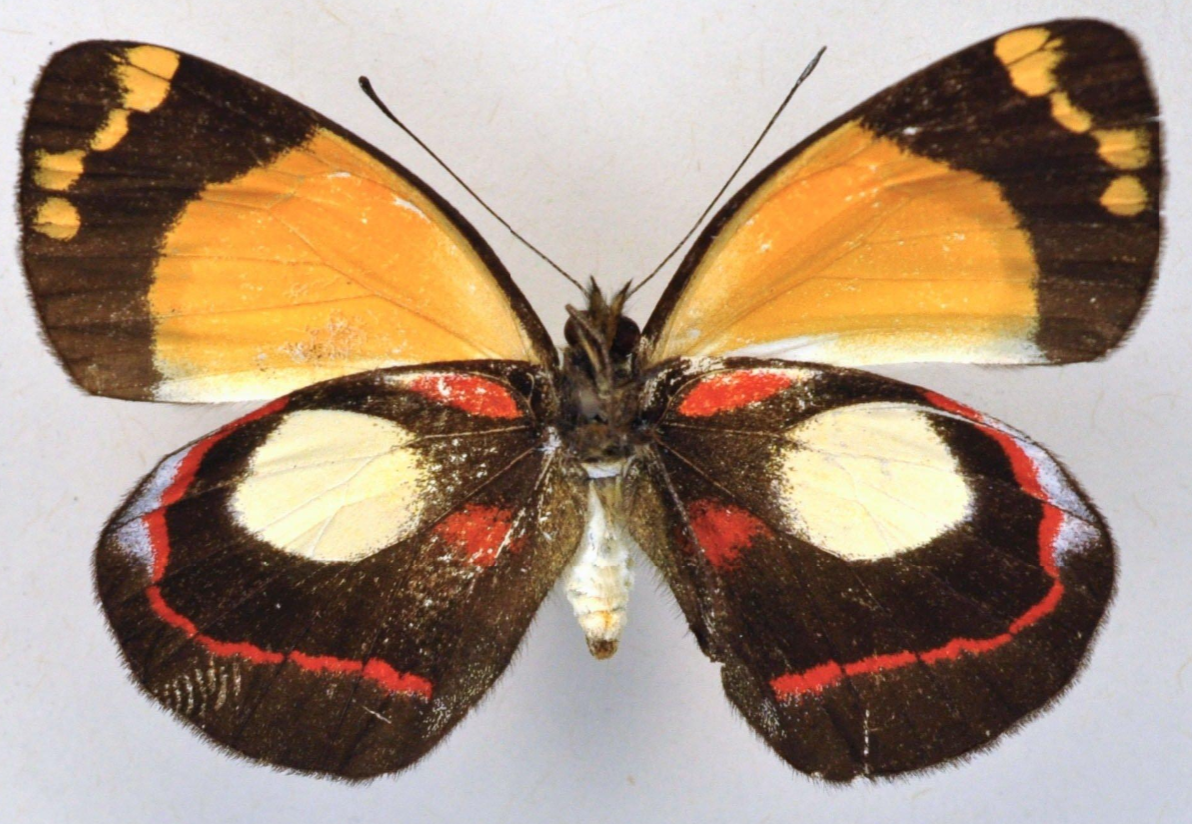

Scientific classification
- Kingdom: Animalia
- Phylum: Arthropoda
- Class: Insecta
- Order: Lepidoptera
- Family: Pieridae
- Genus: Delias
- Species: D. weiskei

Binomial name
- Delias weiskei Ribbe, 1900

Synonyms
- Delias mirifica Smith & Kirby 1901

= Delias weiskei =

Species of butterfly

Delias weiskei is a butterfly in the family Pieridae. It was described by Carl Ribbe in 1900. It is endemic to New Guinea (Angabunga and Aroa Rivers). The name honours Emil Weiske.

The wingspan is about 45–48 mm. Adults are similar to Delias leucias.

== Subspecies ==
- Delias weiskei weiskei (Aroa River, Papua New Guinea)
- Delias weiskei sayuriae K. Okano, 1989 (Kerowagi, Papua New Guinea)
