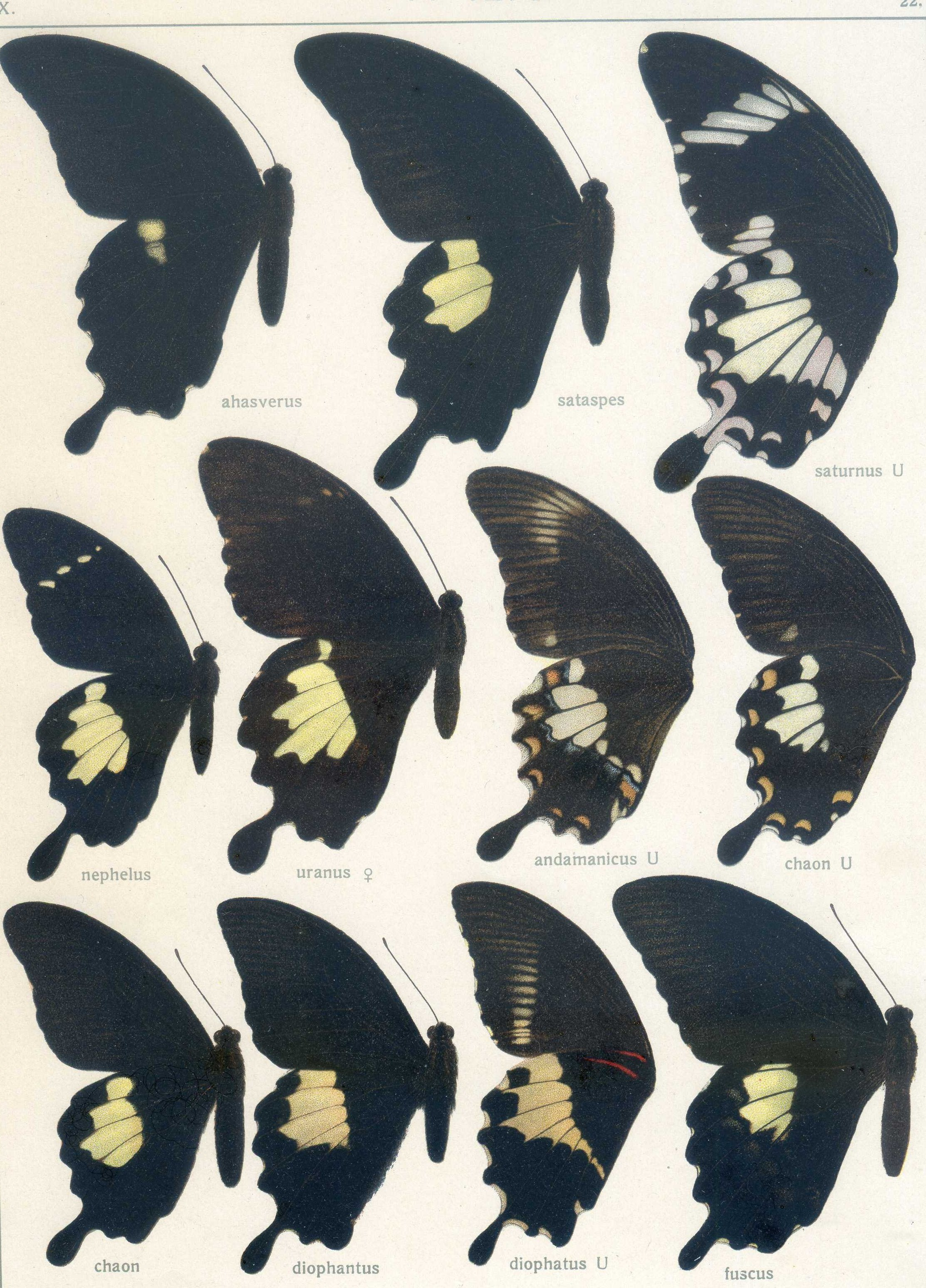
- Papilio diophantus and related species in Seitz Fauna Indoaustralica

Scientific classification
- Kingdom: Animalia
- Phylum: Arthropoda
- Clade: Pancrustacea
- Class: Insecta
- Order: Lepidoptera
- Family: Papilionidae
- Genus: Papilio
- Species: P. diophantus

Binomial name
- Papilio diophantus Grose-Smith, 1883

= Papilio diophantus =

Species of butterfly

Papilio diophantus is a species of swallowtail butterfly from the genus Papilio that is found in Sumatra.

== Description ==
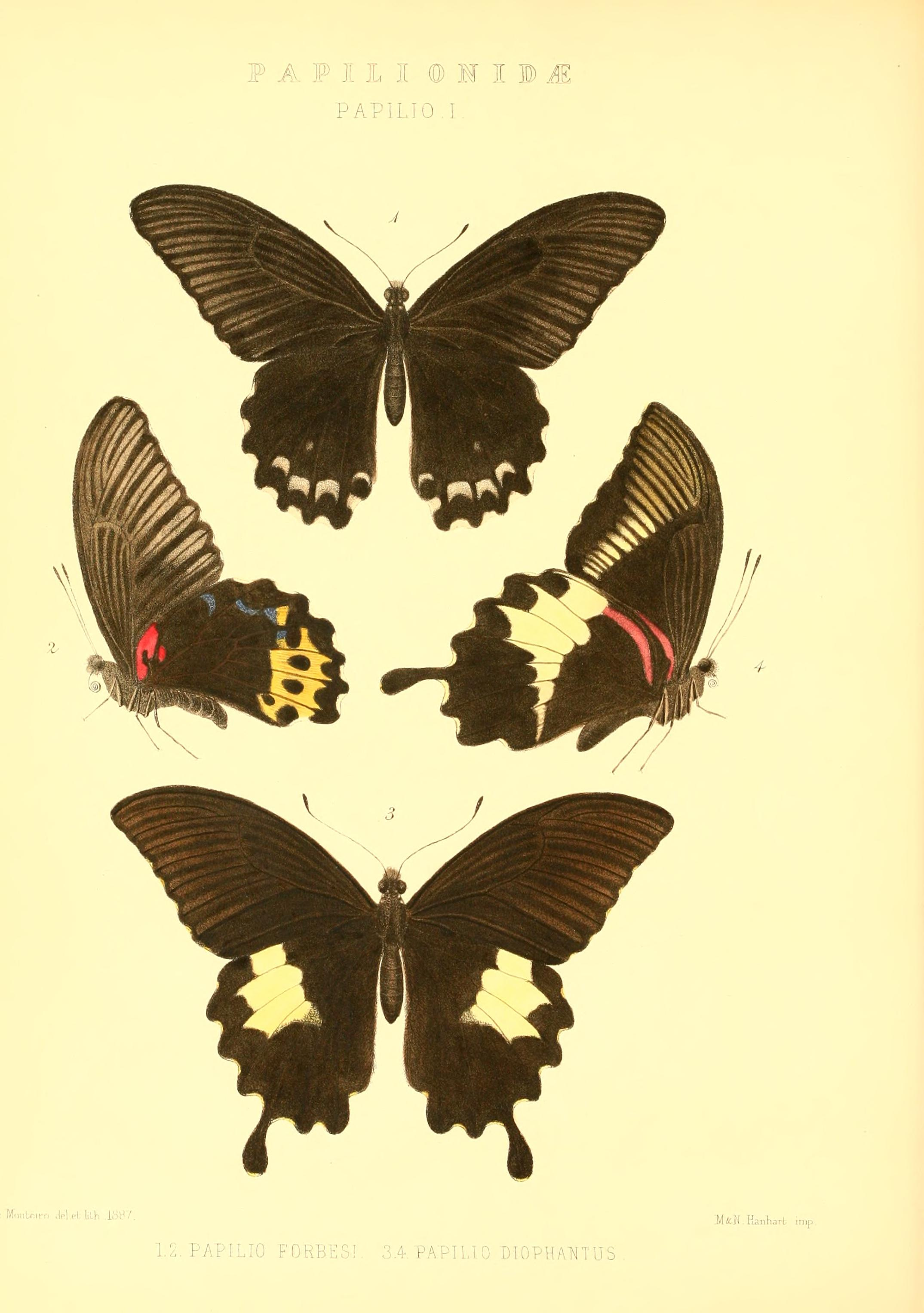
Papilio diophantus in Rhopalocera Exotica (figs. 3,4)

Upperside. Dark brown. Anterior wing broader and not so curved on the costal margin as in Papilio helenus, which it resembles on the upperside. Posterior wing with a tail more spatulate than in P. Helenus, and tipped with cream colour, marked from the costal margin to the third hranch of the median nervule by a large cream-coloured spot, divided by the nervures into four parts, the lowest much smaller and more lunular than the other three parts.

Underside. Anterior wing with longitudinal rays of pale brown, narrowing from the centre of the wing to the interior margin to a band of same colour as the spot. The posterior wing has at the base of the costa, and between the costal and subcostal nervures, two broad lines of red, the latter nearly twice as long as the former, the large spot as above continued across the wing to the inner margin by a narrow band of lunular spots of same colour; there is a small spot of the same colour at the anal angle, and another at the tip of the tail; the lunular spots between the nervures on the margin are more strongly marked than on the upperside

"Exp. 4 and 1/4 inches. Hab. Sumatra (Bock). " In the Collection of Henley Grose Smith (H. G. S., in Entomologists Monthly Magazine, xix., p. 234 (March, 1883)). The specimen above described is a female. The male (the underside of which is figured) has the cream-coloured spot faintly continued on the upperside as far as the submedian nervure, and on the underside it is narrower at the inner margin. The white fringe at the tip of the tail in the female is reduced in the male to a white dot in the middle.

== Taxonomy ==
Papilio diophantus is a member of the fuscus species-group. The members of this clade are

- Papilio albinus Wallace, 1865
- Papilio diophantus Grose-Smith, 1883
- Papilio fuscus Goeze, 1779
- Papilio hipponous C. & R. Felder, 1862
- Papilio jordani Fruhstorfer, 1906
- Papilio pitmani Elwes & de Nicéville, [1887]
- Papilio prexaspes C. & R. Felder, 1865
- Papilio sakontala Hewitson, 1864

== Biogeographic realm ==
This species is located in the Indomalayan realm (Sundaland).
