= Emil Weiske =

German naturalist

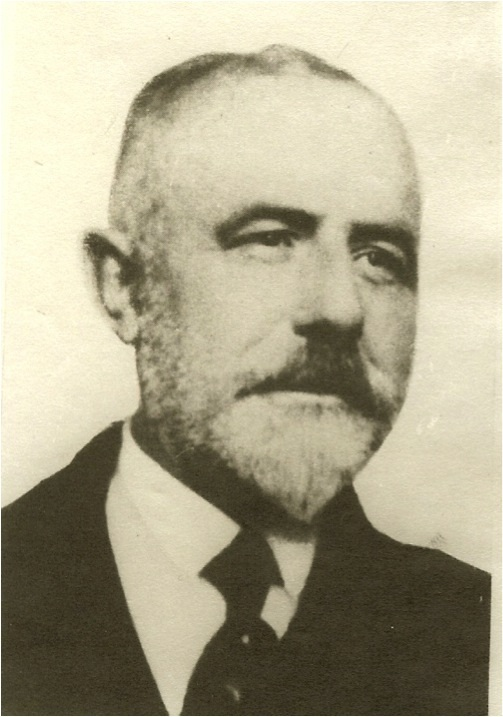
Emil Weiske

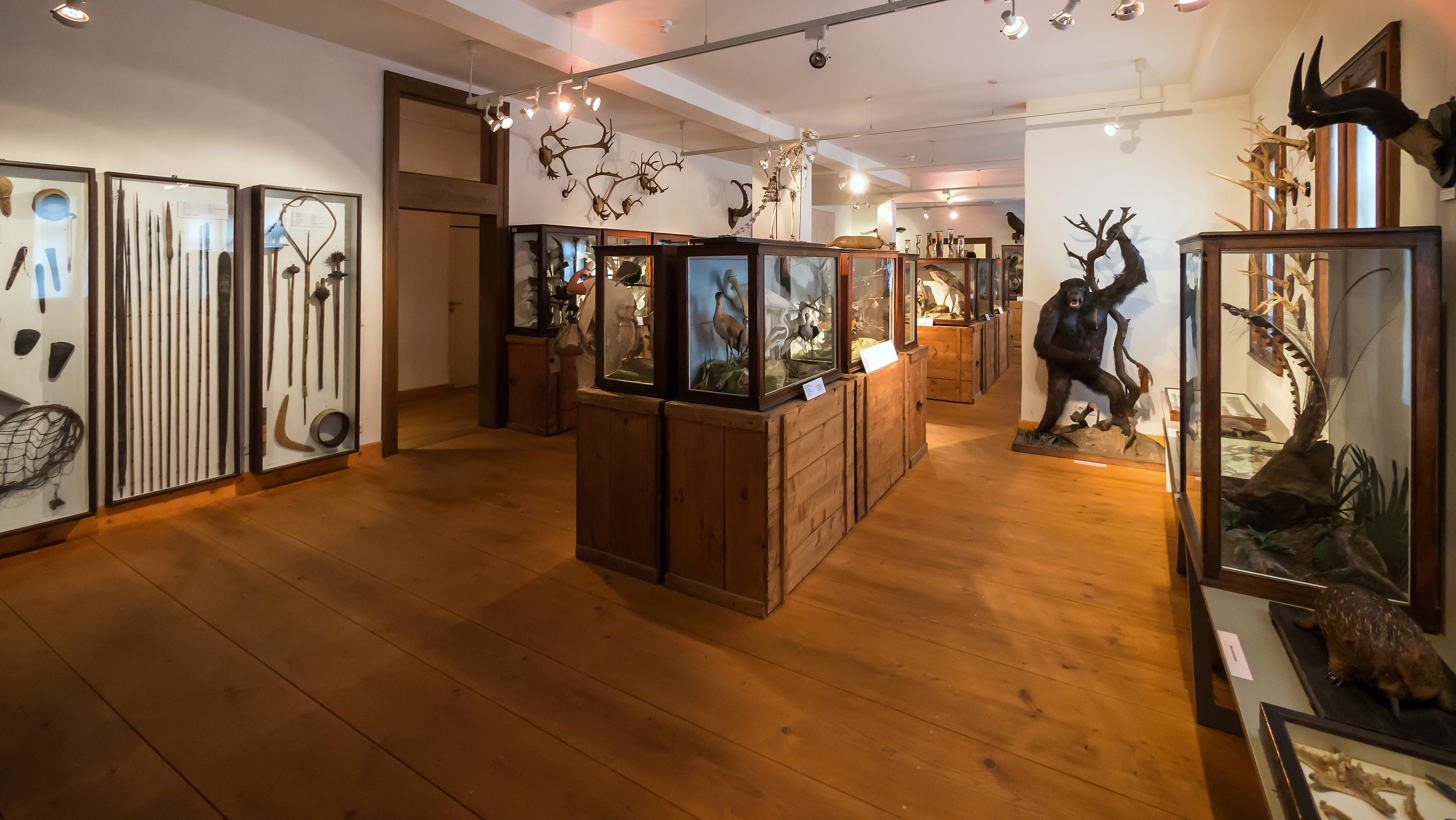
Weiske Collection in Saalfeld

Emil Weiske (1867, Dolsenhain bei Altenburg – 1950, Saalfeld) was a German naturalist.

Emil Weiske was a professional collector of insects and birds. He emigrated to California in 1890 and to Hawaii in 1892. He made expeditions to the Fiji Islands in 1894 and to New Zealand and Australia in 1895. He became a professional collector in New Guinea dealing especially in birds of paradise (1895 -1900). Later expeditions were to Northeast Siberia, Lake Baikal and North-Mongolia (1908) and then to Patagonia (mainly to the Rio Negro und Limay) and Paraguay (mainly) Concepcion (1911). His collections were mostly birds, mammals, molluscs, reptiles and amphibians, beetles, butterflies, herbaria and ethnological artefacts.

His associates were, among others George Meyer-Darcis, Carl Ribbe, Friedrich Wilhelm Niepelt, the Otto Staudinger Staudinger & Bang-Haas dealership Walter Rothschild and Henley Grose-Smith.

He maintained a private museum in Saalfeld where he gave lectures on natural history and his travels.

Insects (all orders but especially Hymenoptera, Coleoptera and Lepidoptera collected by Emil Weiske are held by Zoologische Staatssammlung München in Munich, Staatliches Museum für Tierkunde Museum für Naturkunde in Berlin and the Natural History Museum, London (via the Natural History Museum at Tring).

Birds collected by Weiske are in Staatliches Museum für Tierkunde, Natural History Museum, London, Museum für Naturkunde, Berlin Museum für Naturkunde and Naturkundemuseum Leipzig. Other collections are in Naturhistorisches Museum Wien and Museum für Völkerkunde in Vienna.

He is honoured in the butterfly names Graphium weiskei and Delias weiskei, the bee Colletes weiskei and the bird name New Guinea hawk-eagle (Hieraaetus weiskei).
