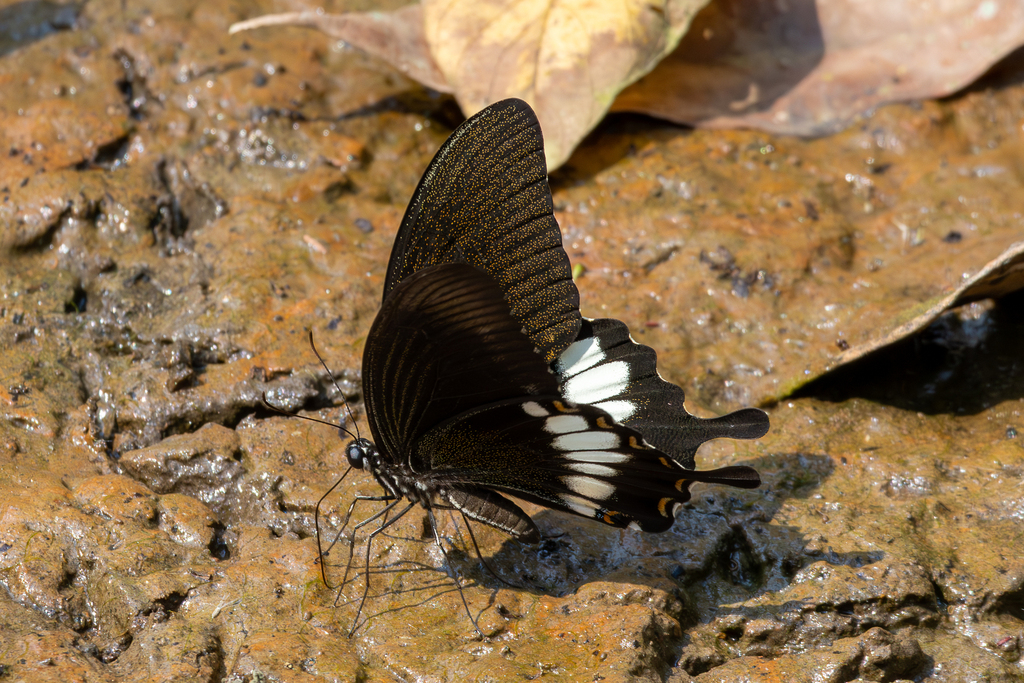

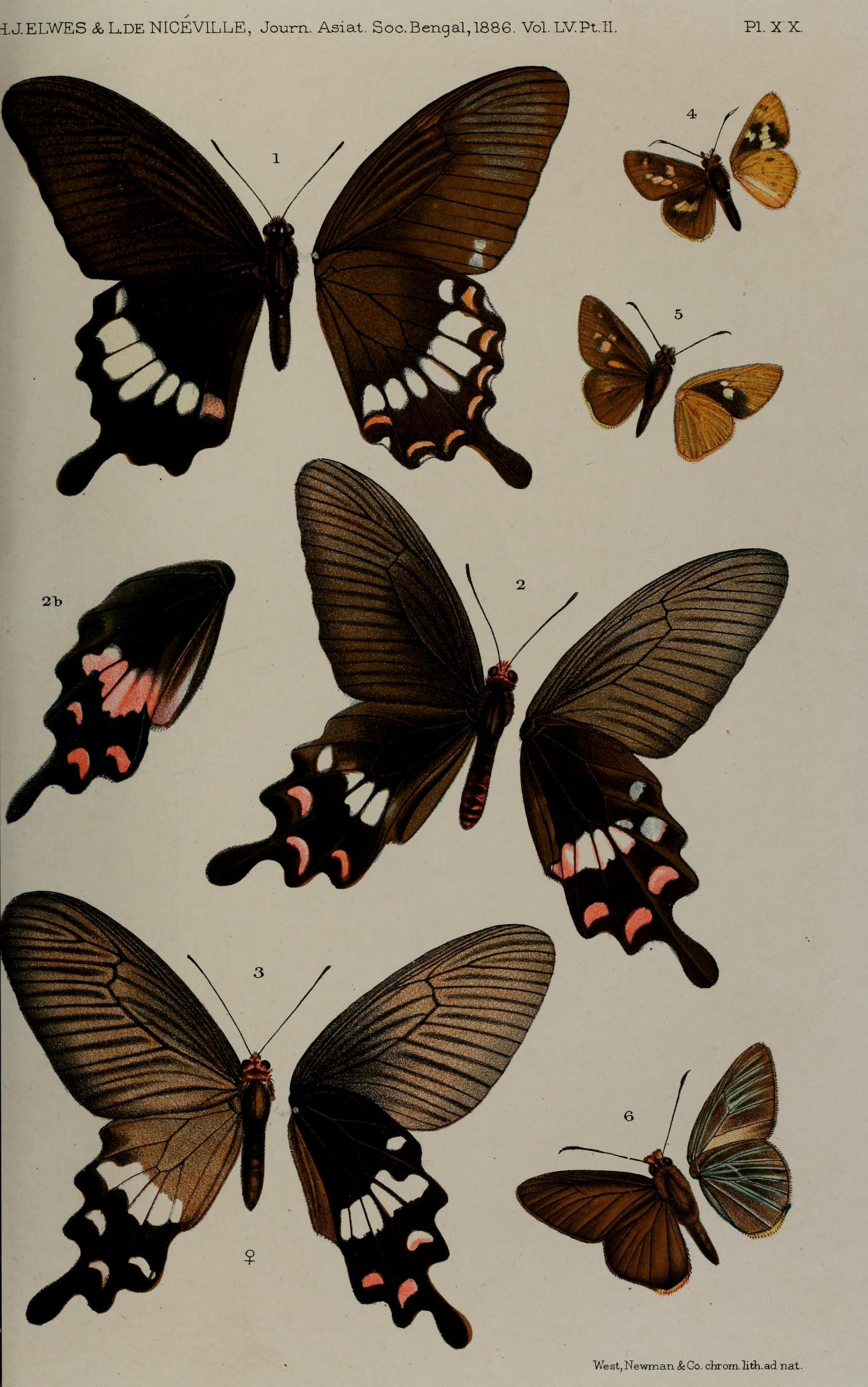
- Original figure in Journal of the Asiatic Society of Bengal (fig.1)

Scientific classification
- Kingdom: Animalia
- Phylum: Arthropoda
- Clade: Pancrustacea
- Class: Insecta
- Order: Lepidoptera
- Family: Papilionidae
- Genus: Papilio
- Species: P. pitmani

Binomial name
- Papilio pitmani Elwes & de Nicéville, [1887]

Synonyms
- Papilio hipponous siamensis Godfrey, 1916

= Papilio pitmani =

Species of butterfly

Papilio pitmani, known as the banded mormon, is a species of swallowtail butterfly from the genus Papilio that is found in Burma, Thailand and Vietnam.

== Description ==
Very similar to Papilio hipponous but forewing above without distinct band, at most with a small spot before the hindmargin.

== Subspecies ==
- Papilio pitmani pitmani
- Papilio duboisi Vitalis de Salvaza, 1921 (central Vietnam)

== Taxonomy ==
Papilio pitmani is a member of the fuscus species-group. The members of this clade are

- Papilio albinus Wallace, 1865
- Papilio diophantus Grose-Smith, 1883
- Papilio fuscus Goeze, 1779
- Papilio hipponous C. & R. Felder, 1862
- Papilio jordani Fruhstorfer, 1906
- Papilio pitmani Elwes & de Nicéville, [1887]
- Papilio prexaspes C. & R. Felder, 1865
- Papilio sakontala Hewitson, 1864
