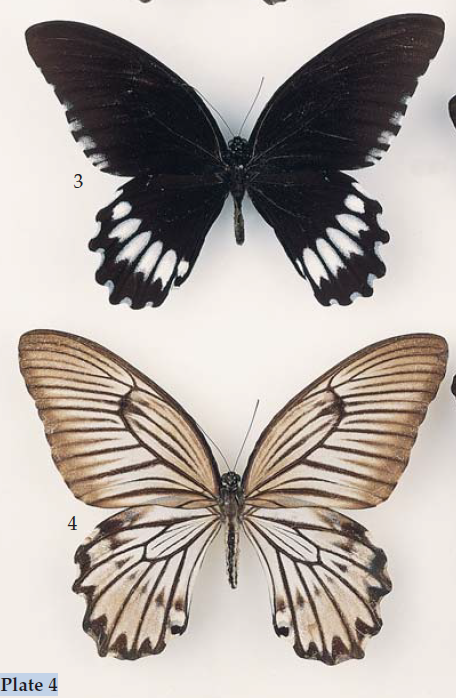
- male (above), female (below)

Conservation status
- Vulnerable (IUCN 2.3)

Scientific classification
- Kingdom: Animalia
- Phylum: Arthropoda
- Clade: Pancrustacea
- Class: Insecta
- Order: Lepidoptera
- Family: Papilionidae
- Genus: Papilio
- Species: P. jordani

Binomial name
- Papilio jordani Fruhstorfer, 1902

= Papilio jordani =

Species of butterfly

Papilio jordani, the common phoenix or Jordan's swallowtail, is a vulnerable species of butterfly in the family Papilionidae. It is endemic to northern Sulawesi in Indonesia.

== Taxonomy ==
Papilio jordani is a member of the fuscus species group. The members of this clade are:

- Papilio albinus Wallace, 1865
- Papilio diophantus Grose-Smith, 1883
- Papilio fuscus Goeze, 1779
- Papilio hipponous C. & R. Felder, 1862
- Papilio jordani Fruhstorfer, 1906
- Papilio pitmani Elwes & de Nicéville, [1887]
- Papilio prexaspes C. & R. Felder, 1865
- Papilio sakontala Hewitson, 1864

== Etymology ==
It was named to honour German entomologist Karl Jordan.
