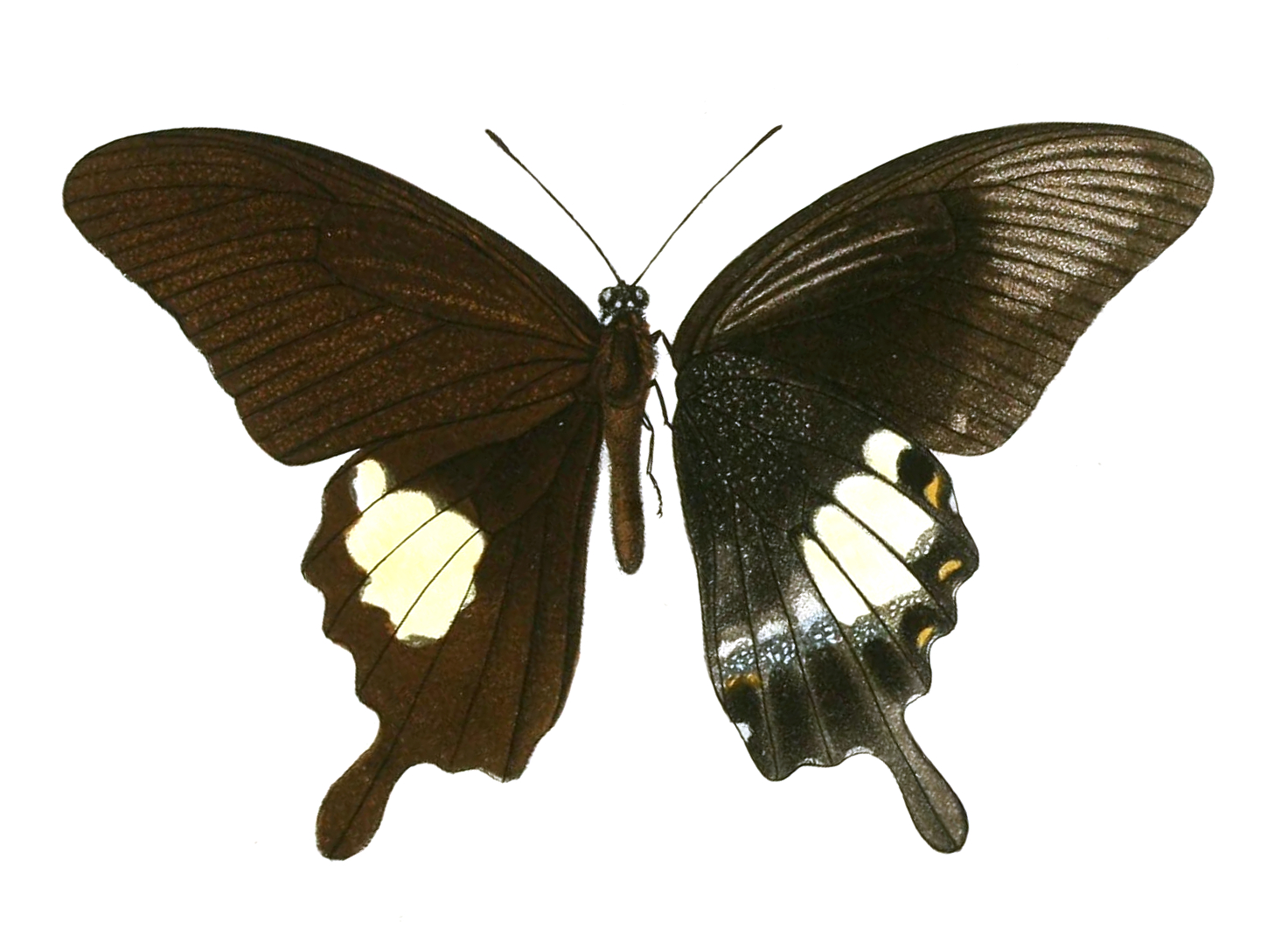
- P. prexaspes from Distant (1882–1886) "Rhopalocera Malayana"

Scientific classification
- Kingdom: Animalia
- Phylum: Arthropoda
- Class: Insecta
- Order: Lepidoptera
- Family: Papilionidae
- Genus: Papilio
- Species: P. prexaspes

Binomial name
- Papilio prexaspes C. Felder & R. Felder, 1865

= Papilio prexaspes =

Blue Helen

Species of butterfly

Papilio prexaspes, the blue Helen, is a swallowtail butterfly found in Southeast Asia. The race found in the Andaman and Nicobar Islands, Papilio prexaspes andamanicus (earlier placed under Papilio fuscus), is also known as the Andaman Helen.

== Description ==
The taxonomic description below is of race prexaspes and is taken from Charles Thomas Bingham's 1907 book (in the public domain):

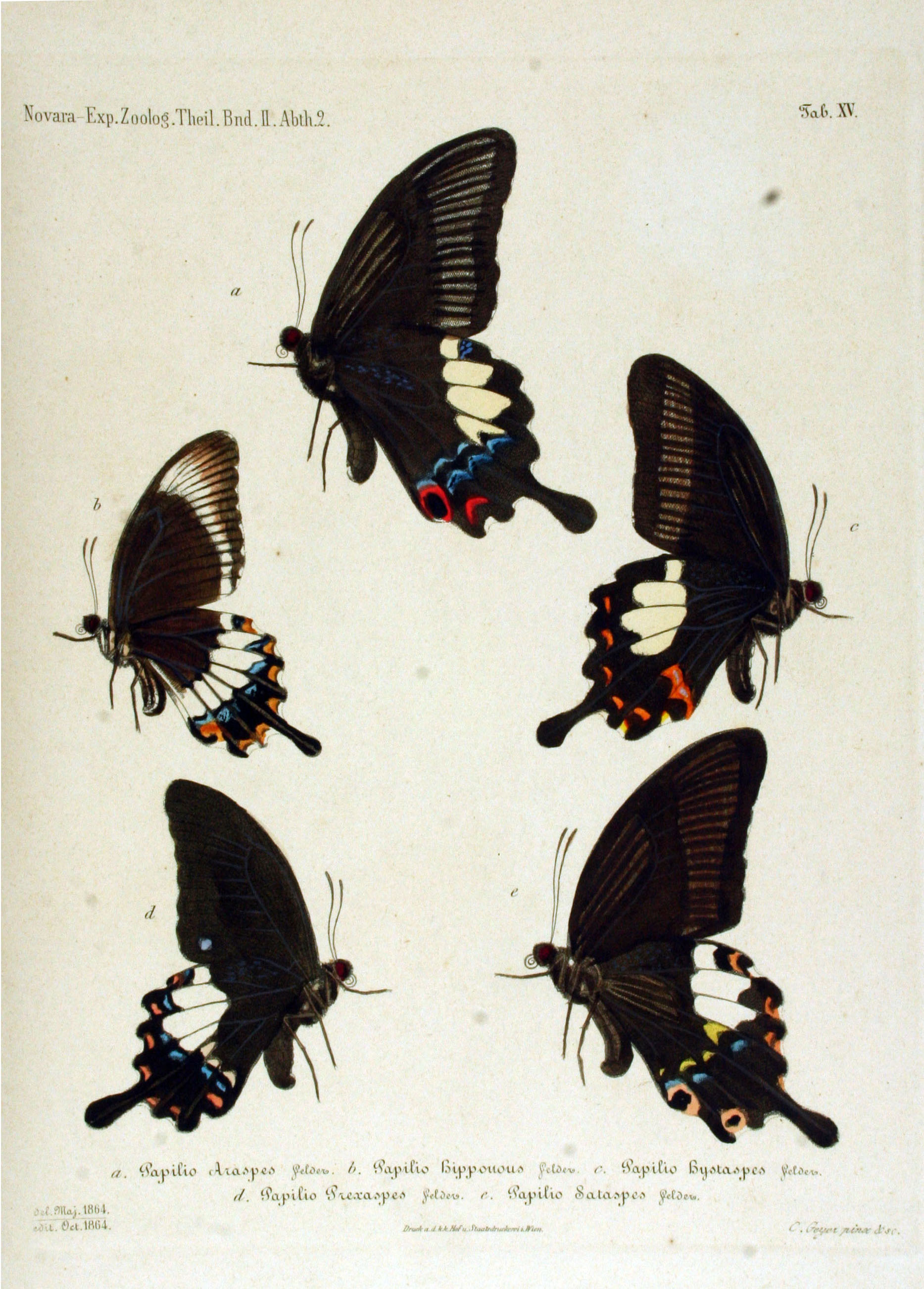
Original Felder figure

Closely resembles Papilio chaon, from which it differs as follows: smaller; fore wing more produced, its termen concave. Male has the ground colour of the upperside of the wings a more brownish sooty-black. Hind wing with the upper discal white patch extended into interspace 4, most usually very slightly so, often represented only by a very small spot of white scaling, a white spot also above the tornal angle. Underside, fore wing: the internervular brownish-yellow streaks limited to the apical area of the wing. Hind wing: the upper discal patch extended to the dorsum in a series of three pure white not ochraceous-tinted spots, a more or less incomplete postdiscal series of lunules formed of diffuse blue scales, and the subterminal series of ochraceous lunules of a darker colour and smaller than in chaon; the rest as in chaon.

The upperside of the wing in females has the ground-colour paler than in chaon. Fore wing with an ill-defined broad pale discal band perceptibly widened and becoming whitish opposite apex of cell. Hind wing: the extension into interspace 4 of the upper discal white patch more pronounced than in the male, the small white spot above the tornal angle followed in some specimens by a blue ill-defined lunule and an ochraceous spot. Underside, fore wing: the transverse discal hand white and much more prominent than on the upperside. Hind wing: the postdiscal series of blue lunules generally complete and well-marked: the rest as in the male.

== Taxonomy ==
Papilio prexaspes is a member of the fuscus species group. The members of this clade are:

- Papilio albinus Wallace, 1865
- Papilio diophantus Grose-Smith, 1883
- Papilio fuscus Goeze, 1779
- Papilio hipponous C. & R. Felder, 1862
- Papilio jordani Fruhstorfer, 1906
- Papilio pitmani Elwes & de Nicéville, [1887]
- Papilio prexaspes C. & R. Felder, 1865
- Papilio sakontala Hewitson, 1864

== See also ==
- Papilionidae
- List of butterflies of India
- List of butterflies of India (Papilionidae)

== Other reading ==
- Collins, N. Mark; Morris, Michael G. (1985). Threatened Swallowtail Butterflies of the World: The IUCN Red Data Book. Gland & Cambridge: IUCN. ISBN 978-2-88032-603-6 – via Biodiversity Heritage Library.
- http://www.bbec.sabah.gov.my/overall/bbec24/TWENTYFOUR.pdf
