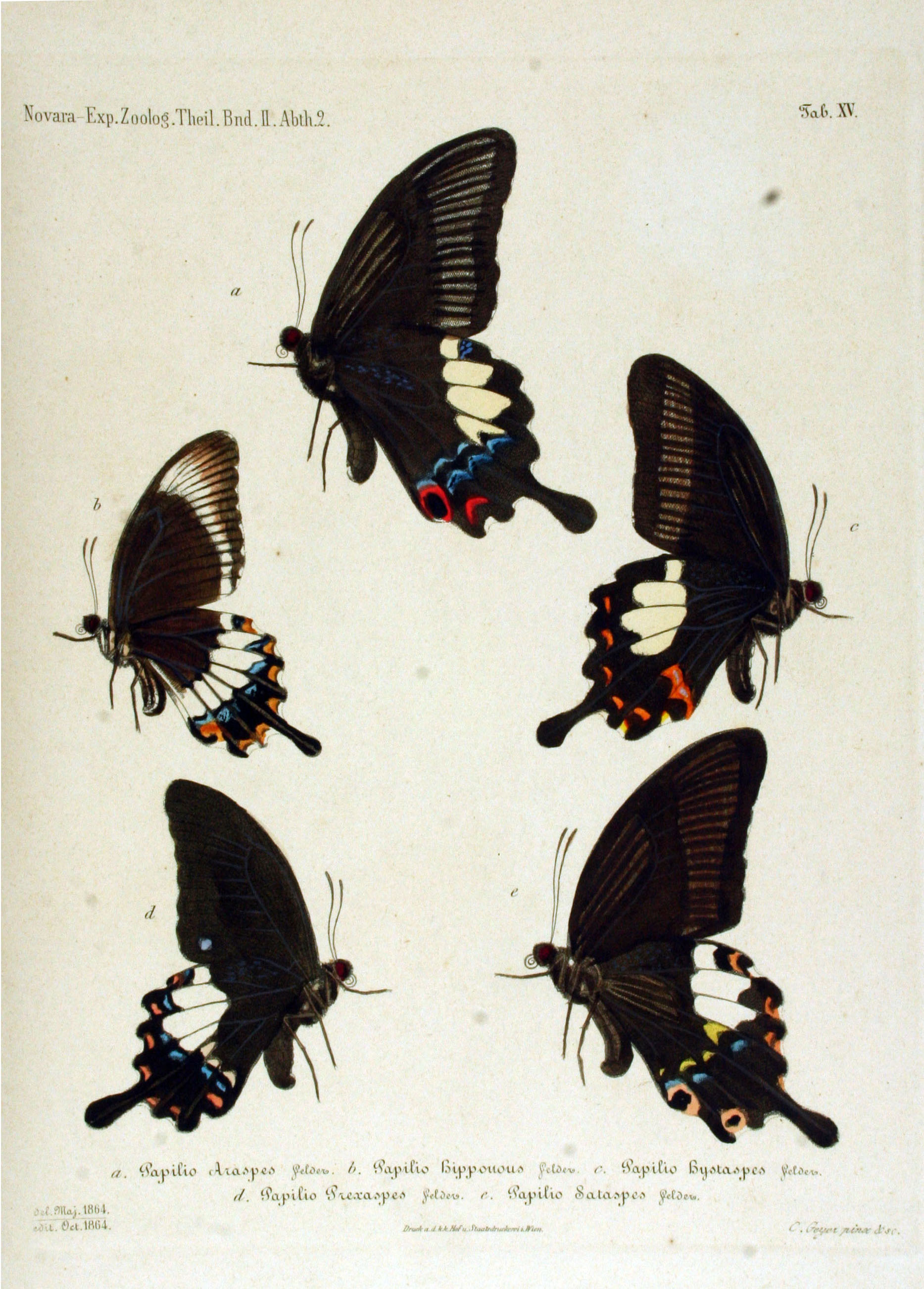
- Figure b in Reise de osterreichischen Fregatte Novara urn die Erde
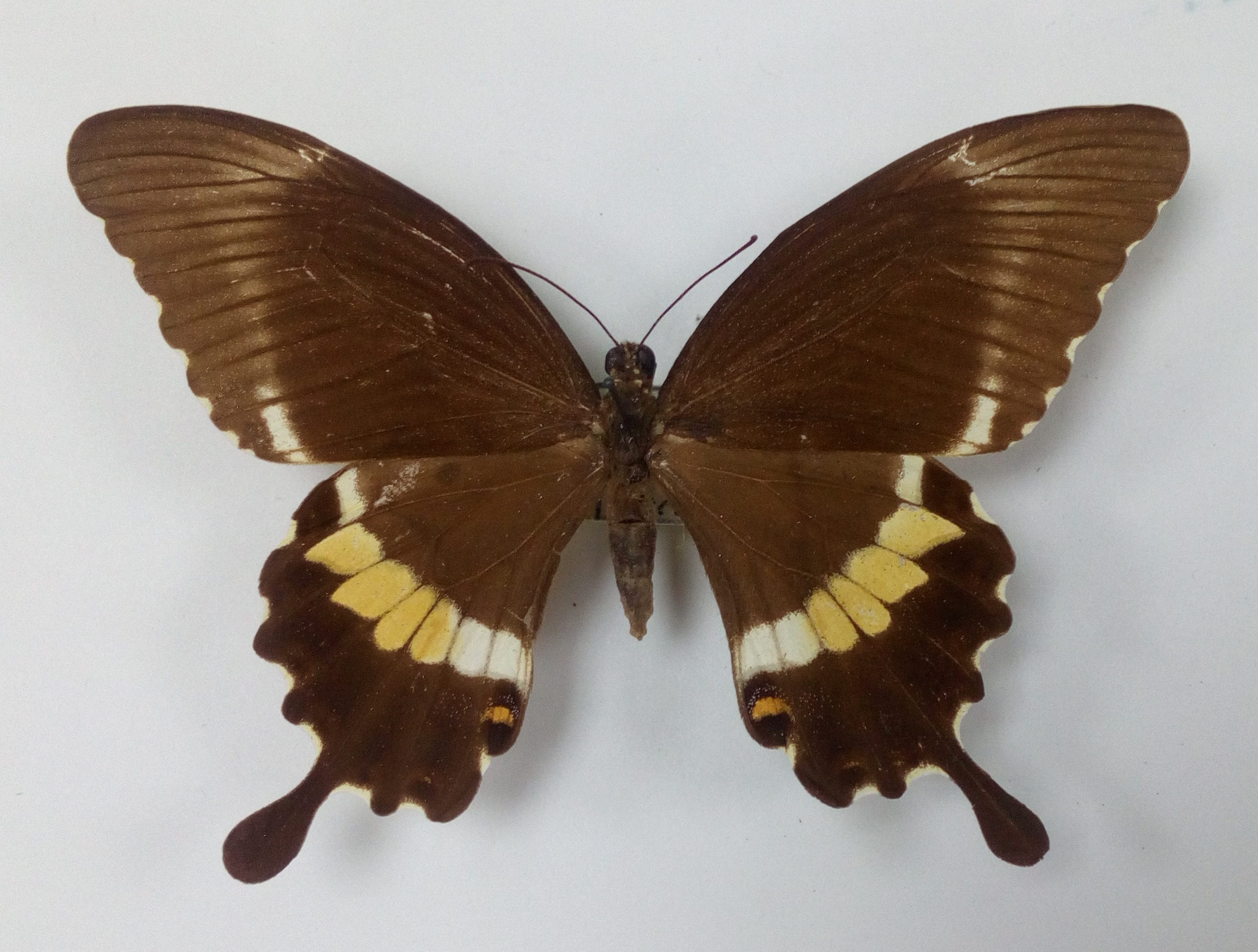

Scientific classification
- Kingdom: Animalia
- Phylum: Arthropoda
- Clade: Pancrustacea
- Class: Insecta
- Order: Lepidoptera
- Family: Papilionidae
- Genus: Papilio
- Species: P. hipponous

Binomial name
- Papilio hipponous C & R. Felder, 1862

Synonyms
- Menelaides hipponous

= Papilio hipponous =

Species of butterfly

Papilio hipponous is a butterfly of the family Papilionidae. It is found in the Philippines.

== Description ==
P. hipponous. Forewing not far from the distal margin with a narrow band running forwards from the hindmargin, which above is yellowish and sometimes absent, and beneath white and sometimes reduced to a small double spot. Hindwing with a white band, broken up into spots by the black veins, which is of almost equal width above and beneath and always reaches to the abdominal margin. The female very similar to the male, but somewhat paler. Nothing is known as to the earlier stages. The males drink at puddles and springs. Indo-Malayan. — pitmani Elw. (= pitmanni Rothsch.) [now species Papilio pitmani]. Forewing above without distinct band, at most with a small spot before the hindmargin. Tenasserim and Siam. — — hipponous Fldr. Forewing above with distinct yellowish band, which gradually disappears costally; the 3. spot of the band of the hindwing about twice as long as the 5. On Luzon. — bazilanus Fruhst. Very similar to the preceding form, but the band of the hindwing of more uniform width, the 3. patch being shorter than in hipponous. Palawan, Bohol, Mindanao, Bazilan. — lunifer Rothsch. (33 b). A very large form, in which the submarginal spots of the hindwing beneath are large and strongly curved and placed further from the distal margin than in the other forms. Sangir and Talaut Islands. — leptopsephus Fruhst. Forewing with an anteriorly shortened white submarginal band; the ochreous submarginal lunules of the hindwing beneath very small. Assam, the locality however is doubtful. Not known to me [Jordan] in nature; is it different from bazilanus.

== Biology ==
The larvae feed on Citrus species.

== Subspecies ==
- Papilio hipponous bazilanus Fruhstorfer, 1899 (Philippines (Basilan, Mindanao))
- Papilio hipponous daku (Page & Treadaway, 2003) (Philippines (Marinduque, Mindoro))
- Papilio hipponous gamay (Page & Treadaway, 2003) (Philippines (Balabac, Palawan))
- Papilio hipponous hipponous (Philippines (Camiguin de Luzon, Luzon))
- Papilio hipponous leptosephus Fruhstorfer, 1909 (Assam)
- Papilio hipponous lunifer Rothschild, 1894 (Talaud, Sangie Islands)
- Papilio hipponous lynn (Page & Treadaway, 2003) (Philippines (Cuyo Islands))
- Papilio hipponous madil (Page & Treadaway, 2003) (Philippines (Busuanga))
- Papilio hipponous palpag (Page & Treadaway, 2003) (Philippines (Sanga Sanga, Sibuti, Tawitawi))
- Papilio hipponous rolandi (Page & Treadaway, 2003) (Philippines (Panay, Bohol, Siquijor, Negros))

== Taxonomy ==
Papilio hipponous is a member of the fuscus species group. The members of this clade are

- Papilio albinus Wallace, 1865
- Papilio diophantus Grose-Smith, 1883
- Papilio fuscus Goeze, 1779
- Papilio hipponous C. & R. Felder, 1862
- Papilio jordani Fruhstorfer, 1906
- Papilio pitmani Elwes & de Nicéville, [1887]
- Papilio prexaspes C. & R. Felder, 1865
- Papilio sakontala Hewitson, 1864
