= Polyura sacco =

Scientific classification
- Kingdom: Animalia
- Phylum: Arthropoda
- Class: Insecta
- Order: Lepidoptera
- Family: Nymphalidae
- Genus: Charaxes
- Species: C. sacco

Binomial name
- Charaxes sacco Smart, 1977

Synonyms
- Polyura sacco

Species of butterfly

Charaxes (Polyura) sacco is a butterfly in the family Nymphalidae. It was described by Paul Smart in 1977. It is endemic to the New Hebrides.

== Biology ==
The larva feeds on Poinciana.
