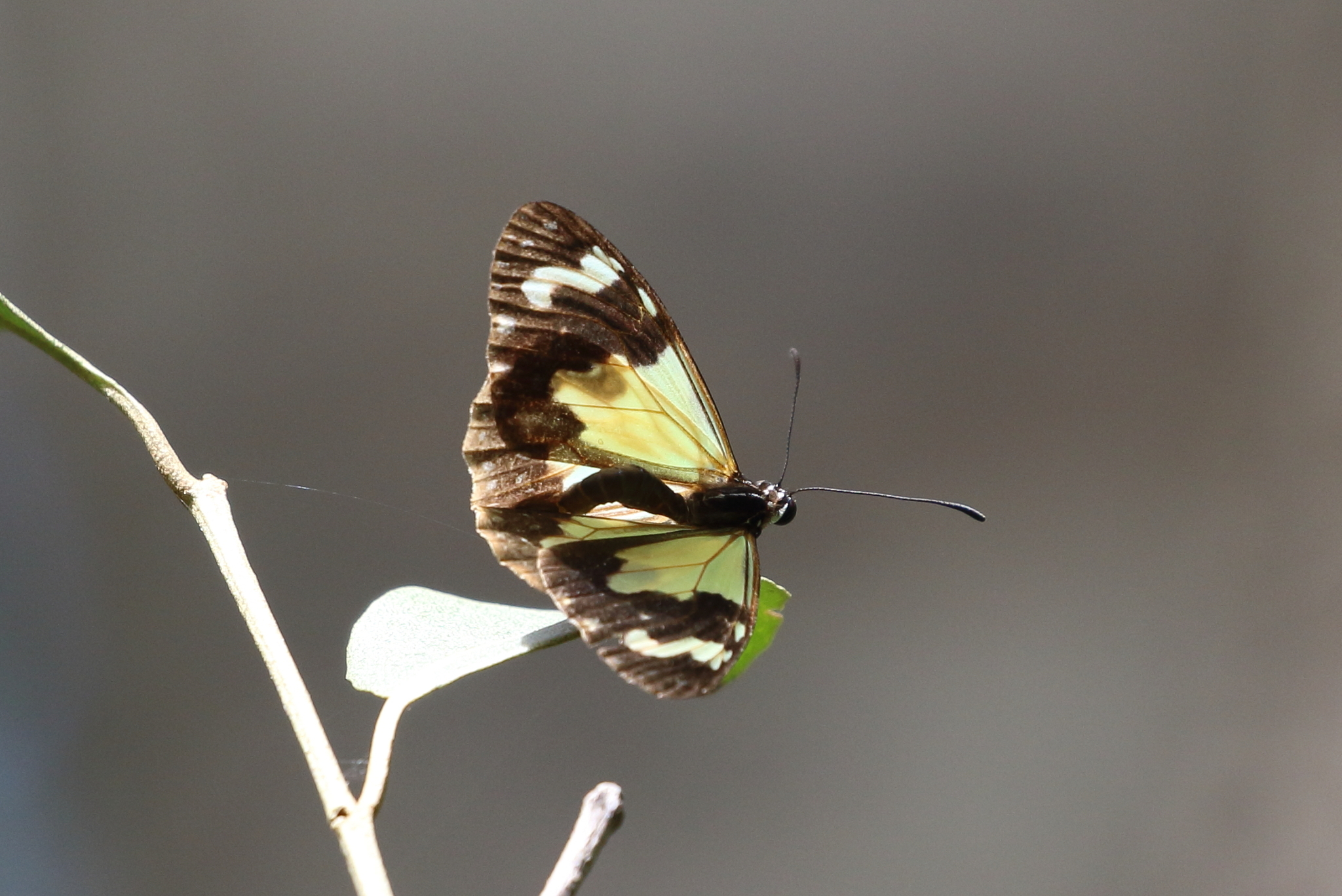
- In Ouvéa, New Caledonia

Conservation status
- Least Concern (IUCN 2.3)

Scientific classification
- Kingdom: Animalia
- Phylum: Arthropoda
- Class: Insecta
- Order: Lepidoptera
- Family: Nymphalidae
- Genus: Parantica
- Species: P. pumila

Binomial name
- Parantica pumila (Boisduval, 1859)

Synonyms
- Danais pumila Boisduval, 1859; Danaus pumila

= Least tiger =

Species of butterfly

The least tiger (Parantica pumila) is a species of butterfly in the Danainae subfamily. It is found in New Caledonia and Vanuatu.
