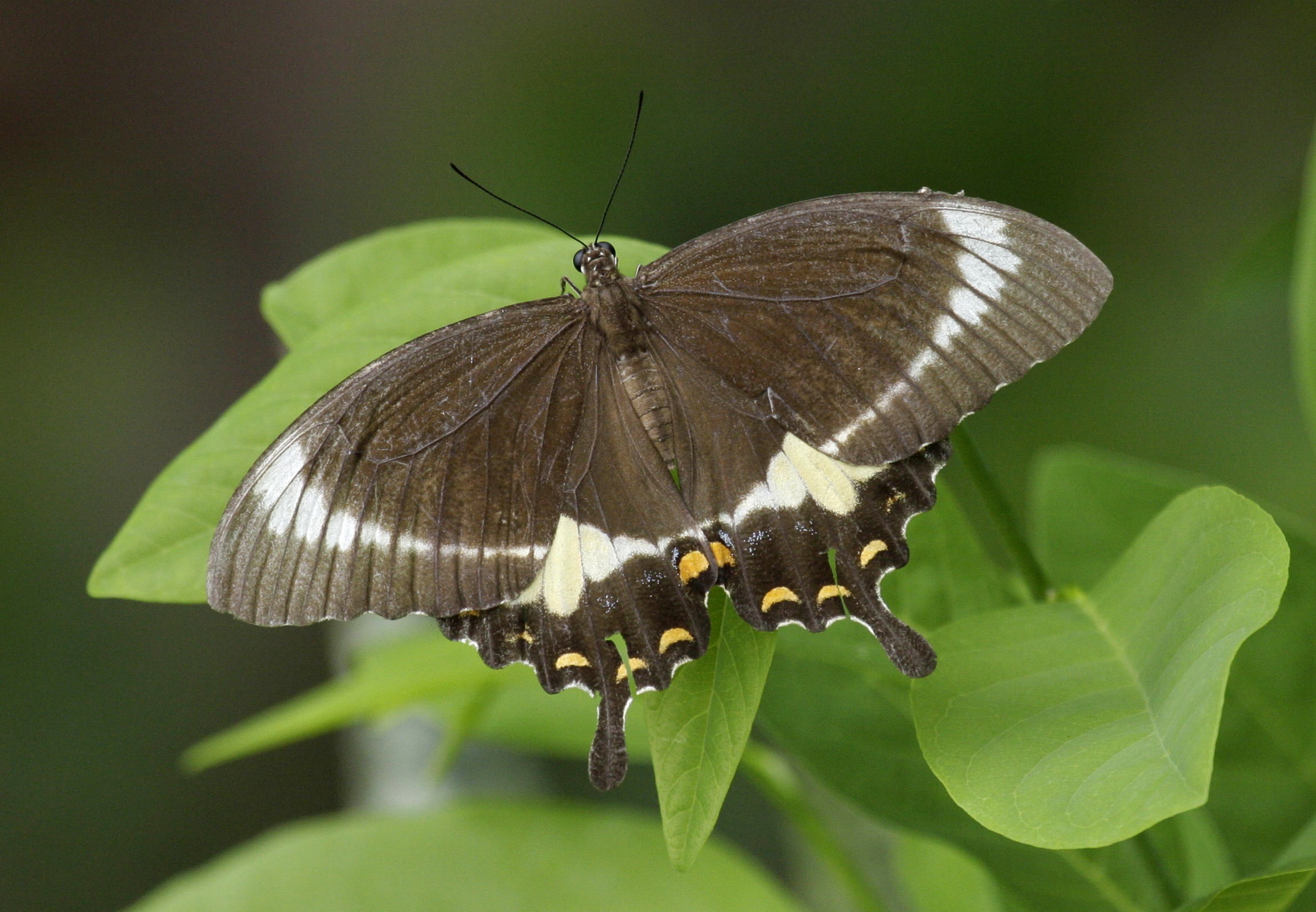

Scientific classification
- Kingdom: Animalia
- Phylum: Arthropoda
- Clade: Pancrustacea
- Class: Insecta
- Order: Lepidoptera
- Family: Papilionidae
- Genus: Papilio
- Species: P. fuscus

Binomial name
- Papilio fuscus Goeze, 1779

Synonyms
- Papilio canopus sumbanus Rothschild, 1896; Papilio capaneus f. yorkeanus Fruhstorfer, 1899; Papilio yorkiana Fruhstorfer, 1900; Papilio fuscus offakus Fruhstorfer, 1904; Papilio fuscus offakus Fruhstorfer, 1904; Papilio fuscus dayacus Rothschild, 1908; Papilio oitylus Fruhstorfer, 1916; Papilio pyrgoteles Fruhstorfer, 1916; Papilio fuscus f. lamponiides Strand, 1916; Papilio cinereomaculatus Goeze, 1779; Papilio severus Cramer, [1780]; Papilio castaneus Goeze, 1779; Papilio fuscus f. madanus Fruhstorfer, 1904; Papilio canopus Westwood, 1842; Papilio capaneus Westwood, 1843; Papilio vollenhovii C. & R. Felder, 1864; Papilio vollenhovii C. & R. Felder, 1865; Papilio pertinax Wallace, 1865; Papilio hypsicles Hewitson, 1868; Papilio indicatus Butler, 1876; Papilio cilix Godman & Salvin, 1879; Papilio beccarii Oberthür, 1879; Papilio beccarii Oberthür, 1880; Papilio thomsoni Butler, 1884; Papilio langeni Druce, 1888; Papilio xenophilus Mathew, 1886; Charus rotalita Swinhoe, 1893; Papilio septimius Staudinger, 1895; Papilio vollenhovii hypsiclides Rothschild, 1894; Papilio vollenhovii alorensis Rothschild, 1894; Papilio vollenhovii umbrosus Rothschild, 1894; Papilio hipponous lunifer Rothschild, 1894; Papilio canopus canopinus Rothschild, 1895; Papilio canopus tenimberensis Rothschild, 1896; Papilio canopus babberensis Fruhstorfer, 1903; Papilio xenophilus hasterti Ribbe, 1907

= Papilio fuscus =

Canopus swallowtail

Species of butterfly

Papilio fuscus, the Canopus swallowtail, is a butterfly of the family Papilionidae, that is found on Timor, northern Australia, and New Guinea.

== Description ==
The wingspan is about 80 mm. P. fuscus. Body similar to that of P. nephelus, palpi laterally entirely white. Forewing in the male without scent-stripes, hindwing with white discal band, which is always broader above than beneath and either extends to the abdominal margin or is shortened, being beneath sometimes entirely absent; distally to this band above almost always indistinct spots of scattered scales, beneath always at least some blue discal spots present; the submarginal spots yellowish red; the stripes in the cell of both wings somewhat indistinct, the cell of the hindwing beneath mostly strewed with light scales similarly to the base of the subcostal area. The forewing commonly with a white, not sharply defined discal band, which is sometimes widened anteriorly into a broad area, which occasionally is alone developed. The female similar to the but paler, the markings mostly larger. The eggs laid singly upon Citrus leaves near their tips on the upper or under surface, light green or pale yellow. Larva when young dirty green, anteriorly and posteriorly whitish, with black Y-spot in the middle of the back; at each end of the back a row of small white spines; head glossy black. The full-grown larva very variable in colour, usually brown-red mixed with yellow and olive-green, the underside pale greenish or whitish, posteriorly at the thorax begins.an oblique lateral band, smaller oblique lateral spots also on some other segments, the pronotum and the 11. segment with a pair of tubercles. The pupa glossy green, beneath in the middle strongly convex, dorsally only very feebly incurved, with short thoracic horn, the wing-cases uniformly projecting, the contour of the pupa viewed from above forming almost a parallelogram, the head truncate and produced into a point at each side. The butterflies in open forests with undergrowth. Distributed from the Andamans to the Solomon but wanting on Sumatra, Java and the small Sunda Islands, and also on the Philippines. .

The larvae feed on Rutaceae species.

== Subspecies ==
- P. f. fuscus (Buru, Ambon, Serang)
- P. f. alorensis Rothschild, 1894 (Alor)
- P. f. beccarii Oberthür, 1880 (western Irian, north-western New Guinea)
- P. f. canopinus Rothschild, 1895 (Romang, Leti Islands)
- P. f. canopus Westwood, 1842 (north-western Australia, Northern Territory)
- P. f. capaneus Westwood, 1843 (Cape York to northern New South Wales)
- P. f. cilix Godman & Salvin, 1879 (New Hanover, New Ireland)
- P. f. croton Fruhstorfer, 1904 (Damar)
- P. f. hasterti Ribbe, 1907 (Bougainville, Choiseul)
- P. f. hypsicles Hewitson, 1868 (New Hebrides)
- P. f. hypsiclides Rothschild, 1894 (Wetar)
- P. f. indicatus Butler, 1876 (southern New Guinea, Papua New Guinea, D'Entrecasteaux, Woodlark, Lousiades, Torres Straits Islands)
- P. f. lamponius Fruhstorfer, 1904 (New Britain)
- P. f. lapathus Fruhstorfer, 1904 (Morotai, Halmahera, Ternate, Bachan)
- P. f. lunifer Rothschild, 1895 (Talaud, Sangie Islands)
- P. f. metagenes Fruhstorfer, 1904 (Tukangbesi: Binongko)
- P. f. minor Oberthür, 1879 (northern Sulawesi, Sangihe)
- P. f. ombiranus Rothschild, 1898 (Obi)
- P. f. pertinax Wallace, 1865 (Sulawesi, Tukangbesi, Salaya, Sula Islands)
- P. f. porrothenus Jordan, 1909 (Tanadjampea, Kalao, south-western Sulawesi)
- P. f. rotalita (Swinhoe, 1893) (Aru, Key)
- P. f. talyabona Joicey & Talbot, 1932 (Sula)
- P. f. tenimberensis Rothschild, 1896 (Tanimbar, Babar)
- P. f. thomsoni Butler, 1884 (Kai Islands)
- P. f. umbrosus Rothschild, 1894 (Sambawa)
- P. f. vollenhovii C. & R. Felder, 1865 (Timor)
- P. f. wasiensis Hanafusa, 1991 (Tukangbesi: Wangiwangi)
- P. f. xenophilus Mathew, 1886 (Guadalcanal, Santa Isabel, New Georgia Group)

== Subspecies and forma in Seitz ==
andamanicus Rothsch. (22 b). Until recently united with prexaspes. The forewing on the upper surface and beneath on the disc, as well as the basal half of the hindwing beneath, more thickly dusted with yellowish; the 4. patch of the yellowish white area of the hindwing shorter than in the two next forms; above no orange-coloured anal spot; under surface of the hindwing with a blue spot at the distal side of each discal patch. In the female the forewing has beneath a white band, which is indistinct behind the middle. Andamans.

— dayacus Rothsch. the hindwing above with distinct 4. discal spot, beneath the 3. and 4. patches do not reach the cell, the 3 lowest patches of the white band large. forewing above with narrow diffuse white band, which reaches the hind- margin and is very much widened distally to the apex of the cell; beneath the band purer white and the cell with a white spot in the apex; the yellow-white band of the hindwing is broad, prolonged to the abdominal margin, and enters the cell; the marginal and submarginal spots of the under surface large. North and South Borneo.

— prexaspes Fldr. occurs in the Malay Peninsula. On the under surface of the hindwing the 6 anterior blue discal spots, if present at all, are very small, the 5. and 6. white discal spots are smaller than the 1., and the 1. does not extend beyond the lower extremity of the 3. The female not known to me. [Jordan]

— pertinax Wall. metagenes Fruhst.). Costal margin of the forewing strongly curved; on the forewing a yellowish white discal band which at least beneath is distinct before the hindmargin, gradually disappears anteriorly and varies very much both in length and breadth; the white area of the hindwing above does not reach the cell, it consists of 3 patches, to which often a 4., diffuse, patch is added, sometimes the area is connected with the abdominal margin by sparse grey scaling. In small specimens the costal margin of the forewing is generally less strongly curved than in large ones. The name ab. minor Oberth. refers to small specimens. In all the localities pertinax varies considerably in the markings, especially on the under surface. Sangir and Talaut Islands, the whole of Celebes, Salayer, Toekan Bessi and Sulla Islands.

— porrothenus subsp. nov. Shape of the wings similar to that of pertinax; fore¬ wing 38 to 52 mm long; the yellowish white area of the hindwing above posteriorly produced into a thin band, which usually reaches the abdominal margin, the 3. patch much longer than its distance from the distal margin (usually twice or even three times as long); the submarginal spots of the hindwing beneath small and pale, also in the often almost all wanting, the 7. small or not developed at all. Kalao and Dyampea (= Djampea), south of Celebes; a number of males and 1 female collected by A. Everett in December 1895

—lapathus Fruhst., from the North Moluccas: Morty, Halmaheira, Ternate and Batjan. Forewing beneath, sometimes also above, before the hindmargin with a narrow discal band, which disappears anteriorly or widens distally to the apex of the cell into a broad but indistinctly defined light patch, distally at the apex of the cell no distinct white spots are present; both wings, but especially the hindwing, shorter than in the race from the South Moluccas; the yellowish white area of the hindwing varies in length and breadth, and the yellowish grey or blue scaling placed distally to it is not condensed into such distinct spots as is usually the case in the subspecies from the South Moluccas. Sometimes the tail is reduced to a short stump.

— ombiranus Rothsch. (23 a) flies on the various islands of the Obi Group. Forewing with large, triangular, white area distally to the apex of the cell, this area, which is very seldom absent, usually produced posteriorly into a narrow, indistinct band, which mostly reaches the hindmargin; the white area of the hindwing large, reaching to the hindmargin or at least the 2. median, the anterior veins which intersect it not black, the yellowish grey or bluish dusting distally to the band only weakly developed.

— fuscus Goeze (= madanus Fruhst.) (22 c). Forewing without discal band, or, if one is present, with white patches distally to the apex of the cell, the costal margin less strongly curved than in pertinax; the band of the hindwing consists of at least 4 patches, it is usually produced into a point posteriorly and very frequently enters the cell. Three principal forms, which are connected by transitions: f. cinereomaculatus Goeze: forewing with white spots distally to the apex of the cell, sometimes with a band extending to the hindmargin; f. fuscus Goeze (= severus Cram.): forewing without white spots distally to the apex of the cell, the band of the hindwing posteriorly running to a point, often entering the cell; f. castaneus Goeze: forewing without white spots; the band of the hindwing shortened, narrow, consisting of 4 spots. We formerly referred the name erroneously to the Celebes form. Southern Moluccas: Buru, Amboina and the neighbouring islands, Ceram, Ceram Laut and Goram Laut. The white patches of the hindwing beneath are commonly so thickly dusted with black-brown that they scarcely stand out from the dark ground, which also very commonly occurs in ombiranus and occasionally in lapathus.

— thomsoni Btlr. (= langeni Druce). Both wings shorter and. broader than in the preceding forms, the hindwing more rounded. Forewing above and beneath usually with discal spots distally to the apex of the cell, but never with a white spot or light band before the hindmargin. The white area of the hindwing above always reaches to the 2. median or the abdominal margin, and distally to it there are only traces of blue or grey dusting; on the under surface the white discal spots are entirely absent or very strongly dusted with black, the submarginal spots, which also are frequently absent, are placed somewhat further from the distal margin than in the Moluccan races. Very common on the Key Islands. A remarkably aberrant specimen (female) has been described as ab. mordingtoni Rothsch. (30 c): hindwing above with 4 white spots, of which the one placed in the cell is large and diffuse; before the anal angle there are 2 large red spots, which beneath are even larger than above; from Key Toeal.

— rotalita Swinh. (= septimius Stgr.). Although Swinhoe gave Key as habitat, there is no longer the slightest doubt that this form only occurs on the Aru Islands. Forewing with 2 to 4 small subapical spots, which above are sometimes only indicated, the 1. the largest, the 2. in the subcostal fork, the distal margin beyond these spots paler than the rest of the wing; the yellowish white band of the hindwing does not enter the cell, the 1. spot is always small, and the band is suddenly much narrowed behind the 4. spot; the red anal spot is always present. Beneath the first white discal spot of the hindwing is very thin, the 2. and 4. are small, the 3. is at most about half as long again as it is broad, but usually almost circular, all these spots remote from the cell.

— offakus Fruhst., from Waigeu, is not known to me in nature. The description agrees so well with offakus. specimens from the Northern Moluccas that an error as to the locality might be suspected. female: the wings above copiously scaled with grey-green, the forewing beneath in the distal part with a whitish grey band which is not so light costally as in the following races; the blue spots on the underside of the hindwing much more distinct than in lapathus and beccarii.

— beccarii Oberth. (27 c). forewing above before the distal margin with yellowish stripes which become shorter posteriorly and the proximal ends of which are often condensed into a thin macular band; between the subcostals beneath usually a few small white spots, which are some¬ times indicated also above, the yellowish white band of the hindwing reaches the abdominal margin and only occasionally enters the cell; beneath there are always at least 4 white discal spots present, of which the 3. and 4. are rarely shorter than their distance from the cell. In the female the band of the forewing beneath is usually somewhat more distinct than in the male but there are never sharply defined white subapical spots as in rotalita. Dutch and German New Guinea; very rare in the German district.

— indicatus Btlr. (= indicatus. yorkeanus Fruhst.). forewing above and beneath with a narrow band, which is broadest anteriorly and often does not reach the hindmargin, the anterior spots of the band distally incised; tie band of the hindwing is always separated from the cell and the white discal spots of the hindwing beneath are as a rule all narrow, none of the red submarginal spots are present above except sometimes the anal spot. In the female, which is much paler than the male the band of the forewing is more diffuse than in the male, and the red anal spot on the upper surface is small or absent. British New Guinea, D’Entrecasteaux Islands, Woodlark, Louisiades, islands in the Torres Straits, Cape York. Common near the coast; Mathew reports a migratory swarm of butterflies which he observed on the coast of New Guinea and which consisted in great part of specimens of this Papilio.

— capaneus Westw., from Queensland. Very similar to the preceding subspecies;. the anterior spots of the forewing larger, and the hindwing bears above besides the always distinct red anal spot at least in the female several red submarginal spots, often a complete row. The white discal spots of the hindwing beneath and the submarginal spots are mostly larger than in specimens from New Guinea.

— xenophilus Mathew (= epibomius Fruhst.) (23 a). On an average much larger than capaneus; the band of the hindwing beneath broader beyond the 5. spot. The band of the forewing, which in many specimens is broadly interrupted and beneath is sometimes entirely absent, reaches to the 3. subcostal and is usually broadest anteriorly. On the southern Solomon Islands: Ugi, Guadalcanar, Isabel, New Georgia, Guizo, Rendova.

— hasterti Ribbe. In male and female beneath and in the female also above the band of the forewing is only. developed posteriorly; in the male moreover the first spot of the band is only indicated above. Choiseul and Bougainville. — The two females taken by Webster, which Rothschild recorded in 1895 as from Alu, probably came from New Georgia; Webster's localities were not always reliable. If a form of this species occurs on Alu, it is undoubtedly hasterti.

— cilix Godm. & Salv. (23 a). forewing above without band, in fresh specimens rather thickly dusted with yellowish, beneath with small white spots from the hindmargin costad, the row never prolonged to the costa, frequently suppressed except for a small spot placed before the 2. submedian, occasionally even this spot not developed. The white band of the hindwing above and especially beneath broader than in all the other subspecies of P. fuscus, always extending to the abdominal margin. Female : paler than the forewing at least beneath with a whitish discal band which is suppressed anteriorly; specimens with almost white abdomen are female-ab. alboventris Ribbe. New Hanover and New Mecklenburg (= New Ireland).

— lamponius Fruhst. Mostly smaller than the preceding (length of the forewing in cilix male 57–67 mm., female 67–70 mm.; in lamponius male 50–61 mm., female 62–64 mm.). The other differences given by Fruhstorfer are still less tenable, yet it is a fact that at least in many of lamponius the white band of the hindwing above encroaches* further on the cell than in cilix. According to Ribbe females with white abdomen also occur. New Pomerania (= New Britain).

== Taxonomy ==
Papilio fuscus is the nominate member of the fuscus species group. The members of this clade are:

- Papilio albinus Wallace, 1865
- Papilio diophantus Grose-Smith, 1883
- Papilio fuscus Goeze, 1779
- Papilio hipponous C. & R. Felder, 1862
- Papilio jordani Fruhstorfer, 1906
- Papilio pitmani Elwes & de Nicéville, [1887]
- Papilio prexaspes C. & R. Felder, 1865
- Papilio sakontala Hewitson, 1864
