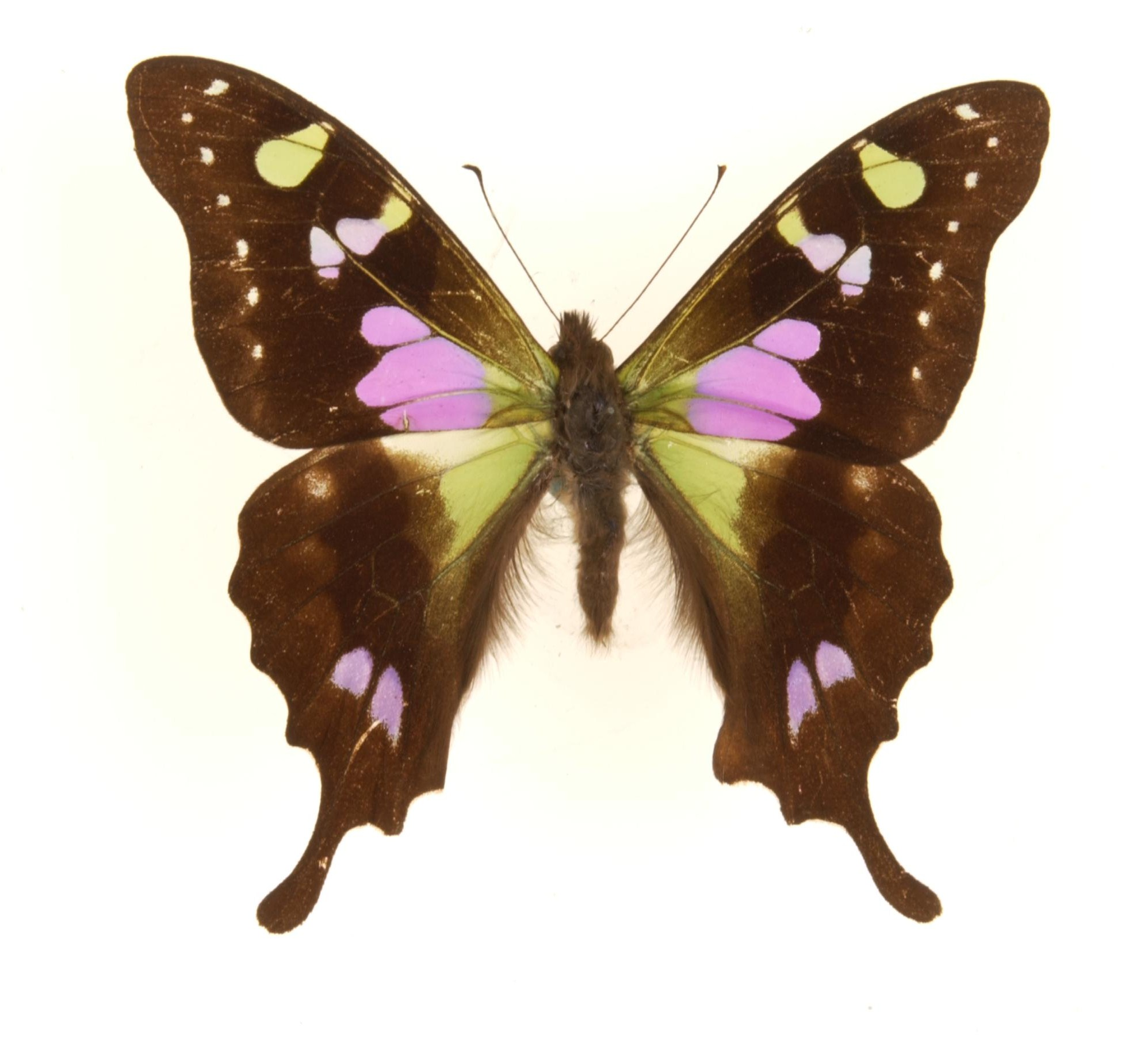

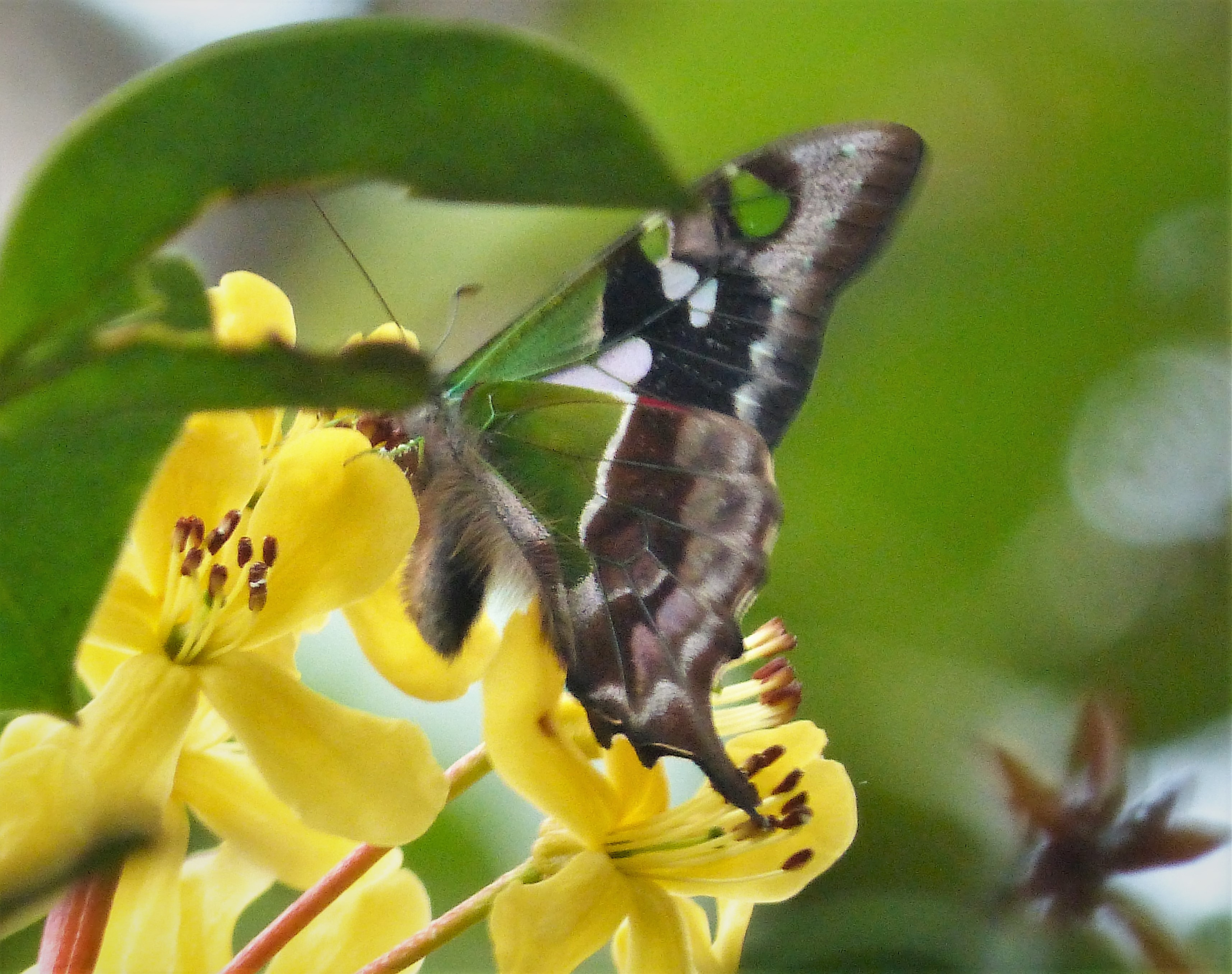

Scientific classification
- Kingdom: Animalia
- Phylum: Arthropoda
- Clade: Pancrustacea
- Class: Insecta
- Order: Lepidoptera
- Family: Papilionidae
- Genus: Graphium
- Species: G. weiskei

Binomial name
- Graphium weiskei (Ribbe, 1900)

Synonyms
- Papilio weiskei Ribbe, 1900

= Graphium weiskei =

Purple spotted swallowtail

Species of butterfly

Graphium weiskei, the purple spotted swallowtail, is a species of butterfly in the swallowtail family; Papilionidae. It is found only in the highlands of New Guinea. These swallowtails live in elevations of 4,500 to 8,000 feet (1,400 to 2,400 m).

The name honours the collector Emil Weiske.

== See also ==
- Graphium stresemanni – visually similar species
