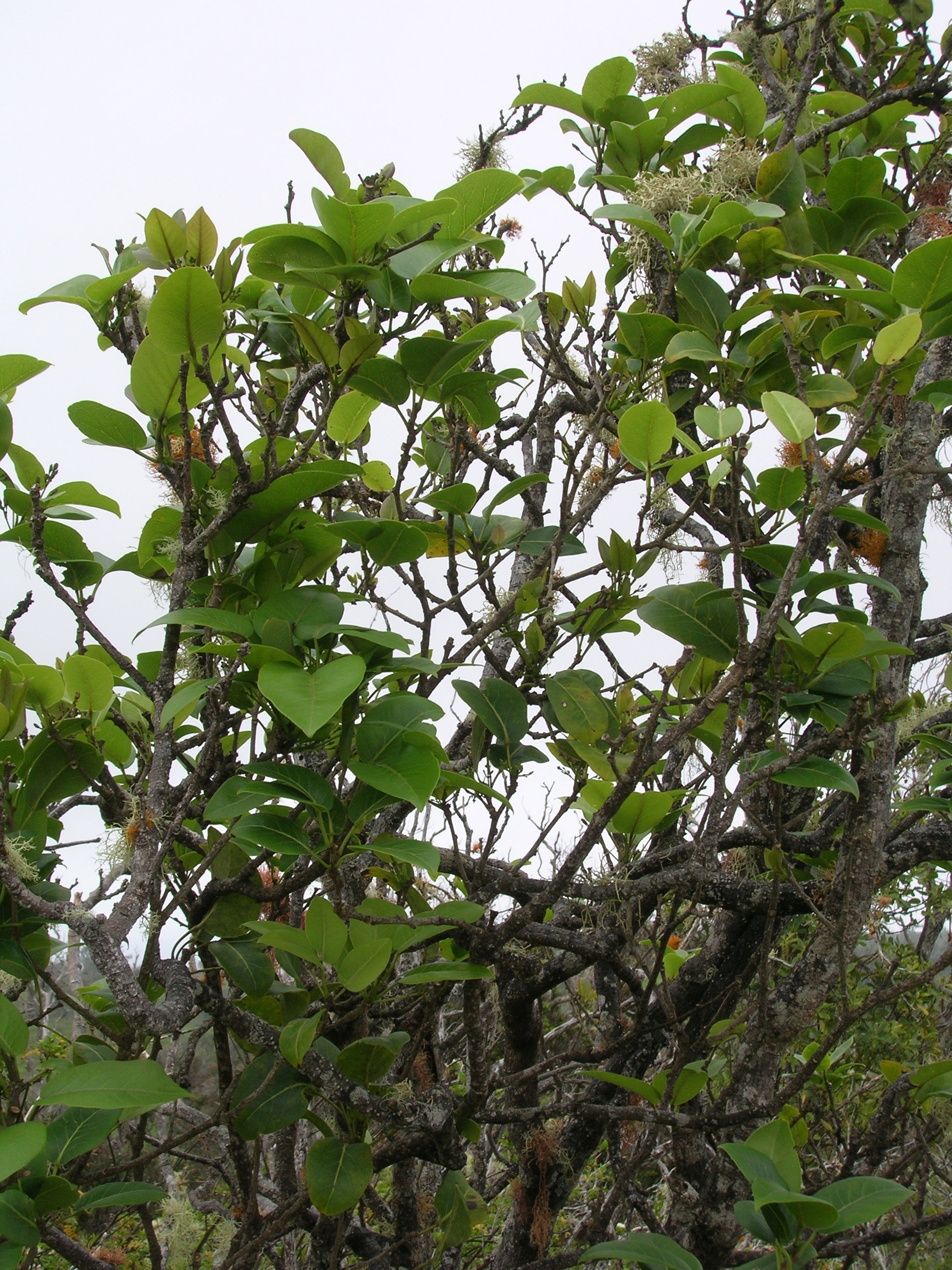
- Zanthoxylum kauaense

Scientific classification
- Kingdom: Plantae
- Clade: Tracheophytes
- Clade: Angiosperms
- Clade: Eudicots
- Clade: Rosids
- Order: Sapindales
- Family: Rutaceae
- Subfamily: Zanthoxyloideae
- Genus: Zanthoxylum; L.

Type species
- Zanthoxylum americanum Mill.

Synonyms
- List: Aubertia (Bory); Blackburnia (J.R.Forst. & G.Forst.); Boscia (Thunb.); Cranzia (Schreb.); Curtisia (Schreb.); Dipetalum (Dalzell); Doratium (Sol. ex J.St.-Hil.); Duncania (Rchb.); Fagara (Duhamel); Fagara (L.); Fagaras (Burm. ex Kuntze); Kampmannia (Raf.); Lacaris (Buch.-Ham. ex Pfeiff.); Lacuris (Buch.-Ham.); Langsdorfia (Leandro); Mioptrila (Raf.); Ochroxylum (Schreb.); Perijea (Tul.); Pohlana (Mart. & Nees); Pseudopetalon (Raf.); Pterota (P.Browne); Rubentia (Bojer ex Steud.); Tenorea (Raf.); Tipalia (Dennst.); Tobinia (Desv.); Toddalia (Juss.); Xanthophyllon (St.-Lag.); Xanthoxylum (J.F.Gmel.)

= Zanthoxylum =

Genus of shrubs and trees

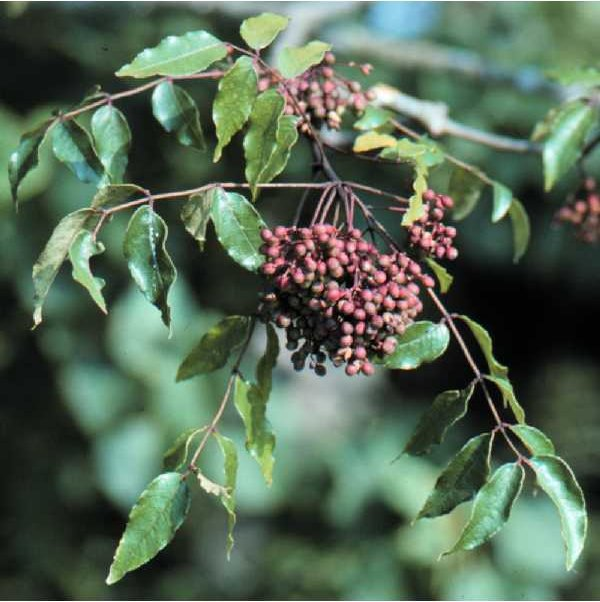
Zanthoxylum clava-herculis Fruit and foliage

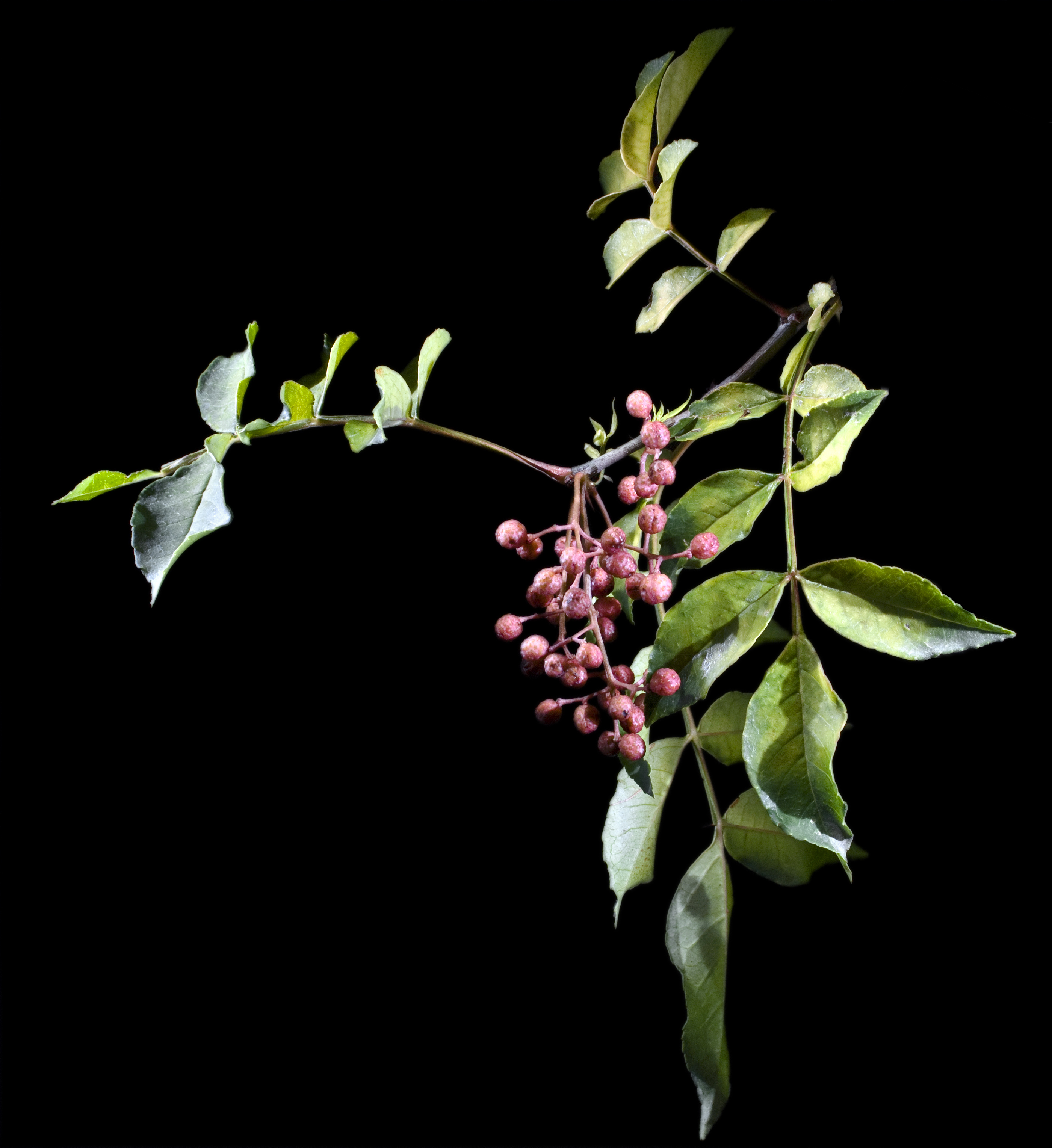
Z. piperitum Fruit

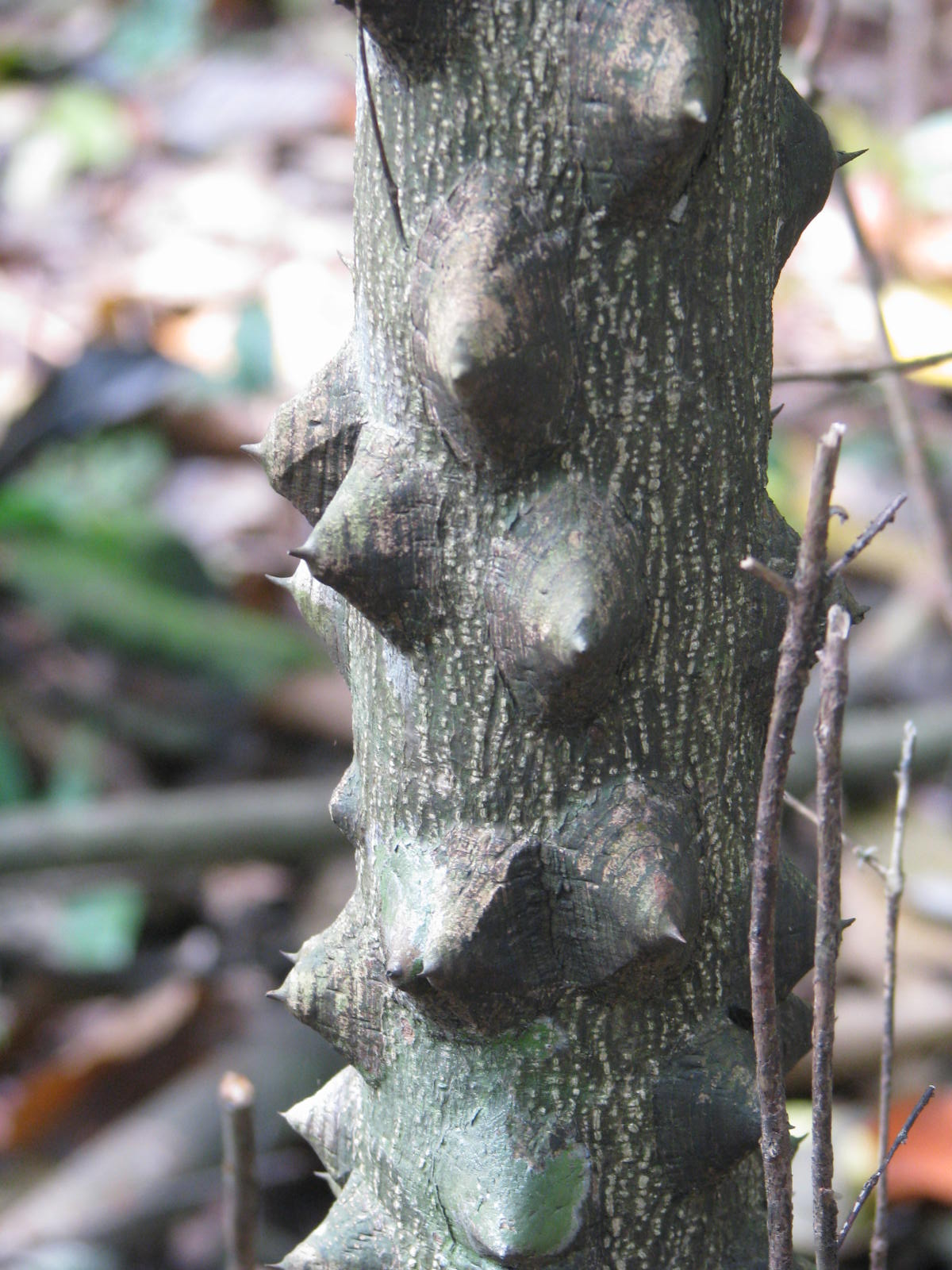
Z. rhetsa bark in Pakke Tiger Reserve

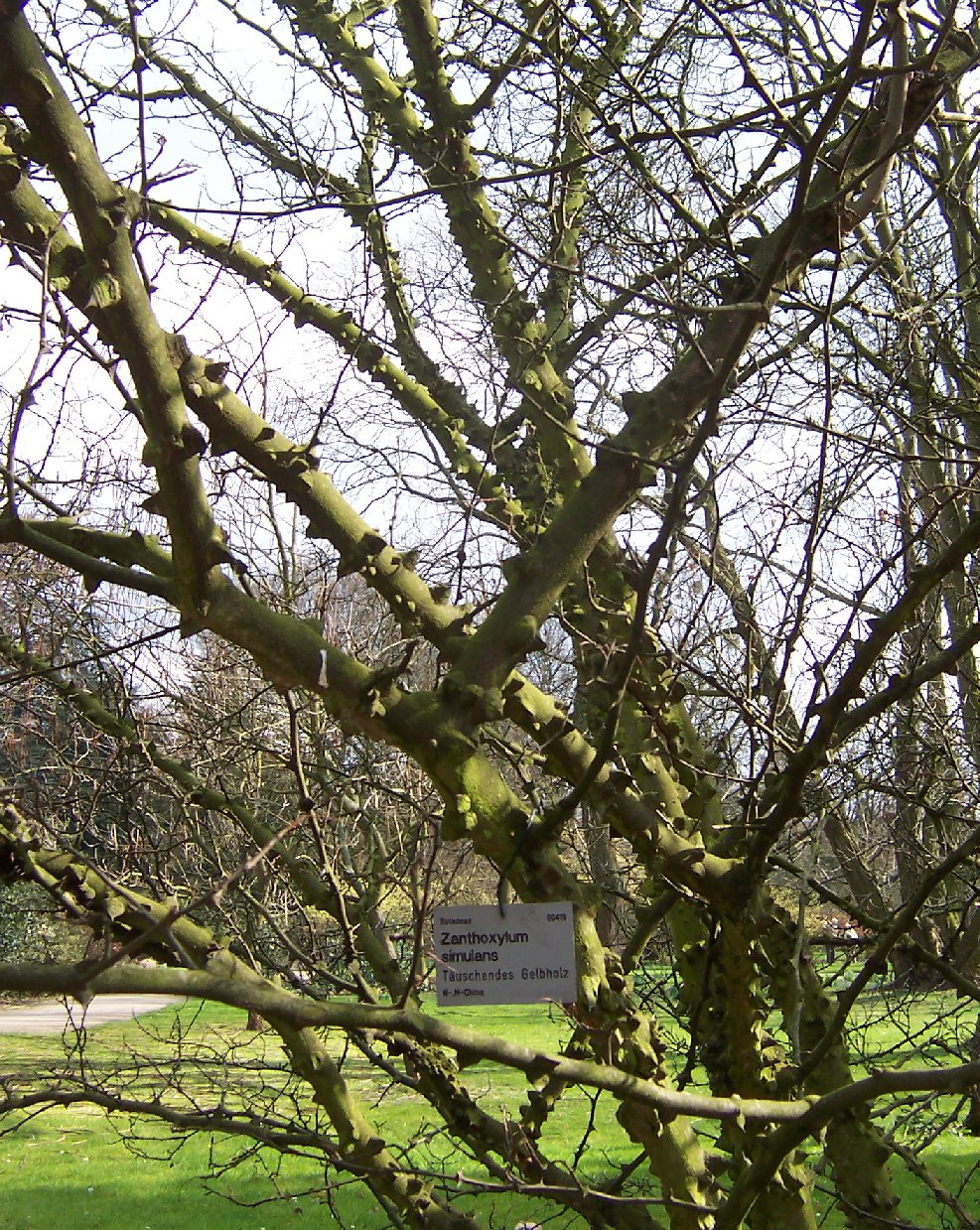
Leafless Z. simulans showing its knobbed bark

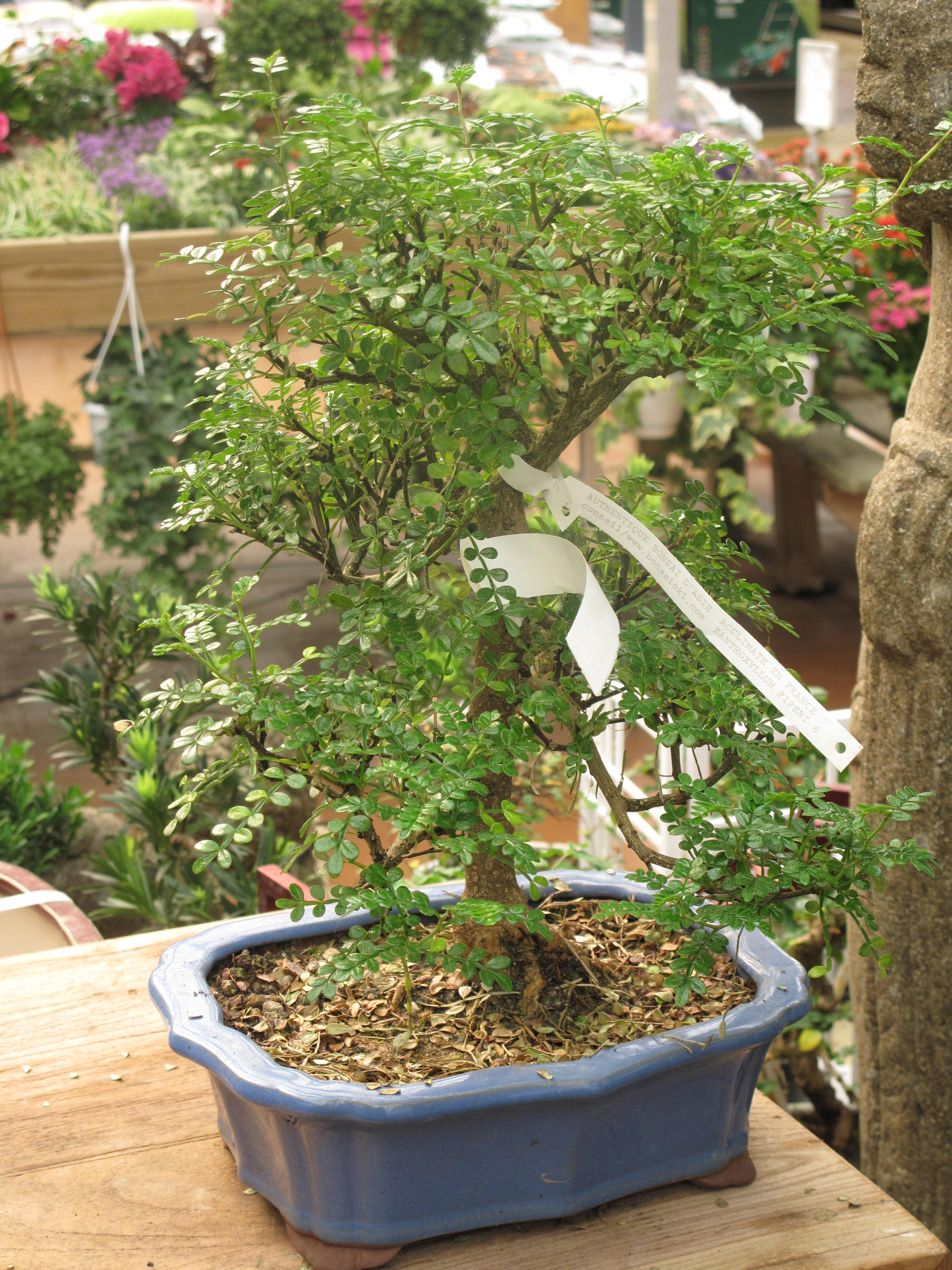
Z. piperitum as a bonsai

Zanthoxylum is a genus of about 250 species of deciduous and evergreen trees, shrubs and climbers in the family Rutaceae that are native to warm temperate and subtropical areas worldwide. It is the type genus of the tribe Zanthoxyleae in the subfamily Rutoideae. Several of the species have yellow heartwood, to which their generic name alludes. Several species are cultivated for their use as spices, notably including Sichuan pepper.

== Description ==
Plants in the genus Zanthoxylum are typically dioecious shrubs, trees or woody climbers armed with trichomes. The leaves are arranged alternately and are usually pinnate or trifoliate. The flowers are usually arranged in panicles and usually function as male or female flowers with four sepals and four petals, the sepals remaining attached to the fruit. Male flowers have four stamens opposite the sepals. Female flowers have up to five, more or less free carpels with the styles free or sometimes fused near the tip. The fruit is usually of up to four follicles fused at the base, each containing a single seed almost as large as the follicle.

== Taxonomy ==
The genus Zanthoxylum was first formally described in 1753 by Carl Linnaeus in the first volume of Species Plantarum. The generic name is derived from Ancient Greek words ξανθός (xanthos), meaning 'yellow', and ξύλον (xylon), meaning 'wood'. It is technically misspelled, as the z should be x, but botanical nomenclature does not allow for spelling corrections. It refers to a yellow dye made from the roots of some species. The first species that Linnaeus described was Zanthoxylum trifoliatum, now regarded as a synonym of Eleutherococcus trifoliatus. The once separate genus Fagara is now included in Zanthoxylum.

== Fossil record ==
28 fossil seeds of the extinct Zanthoxylum kristinae, from the early Miocene, have been found in the Kristina Mine at Hrádek nad Nisou in North Bohemia, the Czech Republic.

== Uses ==
Many Zanthoxylum species make excellent bonsai and in temperate climates they can be grown quite well indoors. Zanthoxylum beecheyanum and Zanthoxylum piperitum are two species commonly grown as bonsai.

=== Culinary use ===
Spices are made from a number of species in this genus, including:

- Zanthoxylum acanthopodium – Andaliman
- Zanthoxylum armatum – "green" or "vine" Sichuan pepper
- Zanthoxylum bungeanum – "red" or common Sichuan pepper
- Zanthoxylum gilletii - Uzazi
- Zanthoxylum piperitum – sanshō, chopi
- Zanthoxylum nitidum
- Zanthoxylum rhetsa – teppal, tirphal
- Zanthoxylum schinifolium – sancho, "green" Sichuan pepper
- Zanthoxylum simulans – "red" or wild Sichuan pepper

==== Andaliman ====
In Indonesia's North Sumatra province, Zanthoxylum acanthopodium is harvested for andaliman. In Indonesian Batak cuisine, andaliman is ground and mixed with chilies and seasonings into a green sambal or chili paste. Arsik is a typical Indonesian dish containing andaliman.

==== Chopi and sanshō ====
Zanthoxylum piperitum is harvested in Japan and Korea to produce sanshō (山椒) or chopi (초피), which has numbing properties similar to those of Chinese Sichuan peppercorns. In Korean cuisine, chopi is often used to accompany fish soups such as chueo-tang, whereas the plant's seeds are separated and used to make oil, and the oil is used as a medicine.

==== Sancho ====
The Korean sancho is made from Zanthoxylum schinifolium, which is slightly less bitter than chopi. In Korean cuisine, chopi is often used to accompany fish soups such as chueo-tang.

==== Sichuan pepper ====
The fruit of Zanthoxylum armatum and Zanthoxylum bungeanum species is used to make Sichuan pepper by grinding the husks that surround the berries.

==== Tirphal and teppal ====
In the states of Maharashtra, Karnataka, and Goa in Western India, the dried berries of Zanthoxylum rhetsa are known as teppal or tirphal in Marathi are added to foods such as legumes and fish. The name in both languages means 'three fruits' or 'three pods'. Because the trees bear fruit during the monsoon season, the berries are associated with the concurrent Krishna Janmashtami festival.

The fresh fruits are parrot green in color and are used as a flavouring agent in many curries made with a paste of coconut, chilis, and other spices. When dried, the flesh of the fruit hardens, turns a brownish black color and opens up to show the black seeds within. The seeds are discarded and the dried fruit is stored in containers for use around the year. Mostly used in fish preparations and a few vegetarian dishes, with coconut masala, this spice has a very strong woody aroma and is discarded at the time of eating the curry.

== Chemistry ==
Plants in the genus Zanthoxylum contain the lignan sesamin.

Species identified in Nigeria contains several types of alkaloids including benzophenanthridines (nitidine, dihydronitidine, oxynitidine, fagaronine, dihydroavicine, chelerythrine, dihydrochelerythrine, methoxychelerythrine, norchelerythrine, oxychelerythrine, decarine and fagaridine), furoquinolines (dictamine, 8-methoxydictamine, skimmianine, 3-dimethylallyl-4-methoxy-2-quinolone), carbazoles (3-methoxycarbazole, glycozoline), aporphines (berberine, tembetarine, magnoflorine, M-methyl-corydine), canthinones (6-canthinone), acridones (1-hydroxy-3-methoxy-10-methylacridon-9-one, 1-hydroxy-10-methylacridon-9-one, zanthozolin), and aromatic and aliphatic amides.

Hydroxy-alpha sanshool is a bioactive component of plants from the genus Zanthoxylum, including the Sichuan pepper. It provides the characteristic numbness.

== Ecology ==
Zanthoxylum species are used as food plants by the larvae of some Lepidoptera species including the engrailed (Ectropis crepuscularia).

== Species ==
The following is a list of species accepted by Plants of the World Online as of August 2020:

- Zanthoxylum acanthopodium D.R.Simpson (southern Asia)
- Zanthoxylum aculeatissimum Engl. (Bolivia)
- Zanthoxylum acuminatum Sw. (Cuba, Jamaica)
- Zanthoxylum ailanthoides Siebold & Zucc. – ailanthus-like prickly ash
- Zanthoxylum albiflorum Baker f. (New Caledonia)
- Zanthoxylum albuquerquei D.C. (Peru)
- Zanthoxylum amamiense Ohwi (Ryukyu Islands)
- Zanthoxylum amapaense (Albuq.) P.G.Waterm. (Brazil, Venezuela)
- Zanthoxylum americanum Mill. – northern prickly ash, prickly ash, toothache tree (Canada, United States)
- Zanthoxylum anadenium (Urb. & Ekman) J.Jiménez Alm. (Haiti)
- Zanthoxylum andamanicum Kurz (Andaman Islands)
- Zanthoxylum andinum Reynel (Ecuador)
- Zanthoxylum anison L.O.Williams (Guatemala)
- Zanthoxylum anthyllidifolium Guillaumin (Vietnam)
- Zanthoxylum apiculatum (Sandwith) P.G.Waterman (South America)
- Zanthoxylum arborescens Rose (Mexico, Nicaragua)
- Zanthoxylum armatum DC. – winged prickly ash (Indian subcontinent to temperate east Asia and Malesia)
- Zanthoxylum atchoum (Aké Assi) P.G.Waterman (Côte d'Ivoire)
- Zanthoxylum austrosinense C.C.Huang (southern China)
- Zanthoxylum avicennae (Lam.) DC. (southern China to western and central Malesia)
- Zanthoxylum backeri (Bakh.f.) T.G.Hartley
- Zanthoxylum beechyanum K.Koch (Bonin Islands, Ryukya Islands)
- Zanthoxylum bifoliolatum Leonard – Maricao prickly ash (Hispaniola to Puerto Rico)
- Zanthoxylum bissei Beurton (Cuba)
- Zanthoxylum bonifaziae Cornejo & Reynel (Ecuador)
- Zanthoxylum bouetense (Pierre ex Letouzey) P.G.Waterman (Congo, Gabon)
- Zanthoxylum brachyacanthum F.Muell. – thorny yellowwood (New South Wales, Queensland)
- Zanthoxylum brisasanum (Cuatrec.) P.G.Waterman (Colombia to Peru)
- Zanthoxylum buesgenii (Engl.) P.G.Waterman (southern Nigeria to west central tropical Africa)
- Zanthoxylum bungeanum Maxim. – Chinese/Sichuan pepper (Himalaya to China)
- Zanthoxylum burkillianum Babu
- Zanthoxylum calcicola C.C.Huang (China)
- Zanthoxylum campicola Reynel (Colombia)
- Zanthoxylum canalense (Guillaumin) P.G.Waterman
- Zanthoxylum capense (Thunb.) Harv. (southern Africa)
- Zanthoxylum caribaeum Lam. – yellow prickly ash (Mexico to tropical America)
- Zanthoxylum caudatum Alston (Sri Lanka)
- Zanthoxylum celebicum Koord. (Sulawesi)
- Zanthoxylum chalybeum Engl. (Belize, Guatemala, Honduras)
- Zanthoxylum chevalieri P.G.Waterman (western tropical Africa)
- Zanthoxylum chuquisaquense Reynel (Bolivia)
- Zanthoxylum ciliatum Engl. (Mexico to northern Venezuela)
- Zanthoxylum claessensii (De Wild.) P.G.Waterman (west central tropical Africa)
- Zanthoxylum clava-herculis L. – Hercules' club, pepperbark, southern prickly ash, West Indian yellowwood (central and southeastern United States to eastern Mexico)
- Zanthoxylum coco Gillies ex Hook.f. f. & Arn. – coco, cochucho, smelly sauco (Argentina, Bolivia, Paraguay)
- Zanthoxylum collinsiae Craib (China to Indochina)
- Zanthoxylum comosum (Herzog) P.G.Waterman (central Bolivia)
- Zanthoxylum compactum (Huber ex Albuq.) P.G.Waterman (Venezuela to western South America)
- Zanthoxylum conspersipunctatum Merr. & Perry (New Guinea)
- Zanthoxylum cucullatipetalum Guillaumin (Vietnam)
- Zanthoxylum davyi (I.Verd.) P.G.Waterman – forest knobwood (Zimbabwe to South Africa)
- Zanthoxylum decaryi H.Perrier (Madagascar)
- Zanthoxylum delagoense P.G.Waterman (southern Mozambique)
- Zanthoxylum deremense (Engl.) Kokwaro (Malawi, Tanzania)
- Zanthoxylum dimorphophyllum Hemsl. (southern China to Indochina, Taiwan)
- Zanthoxylum dinklagei (Engl.) P.G.Waterman (southern Nigeria to western central tropical Africa)
- Zanthoxylum dipetalum H.Mann – Kāwaʻu (Hawaii)
- Zanthoxylum dissitum Hemsl. (central and southern China to Hainan)
- Zanthoxylum diversifolium Warb. (New Guinea)
- Zanthoxylum djalma-batistae (Albuq.) P.G.Waterman (Brazil)
- Zanthoxylum domingense (Krug & Urb.) J.Jiménez Alm. (Haiti)
- Zanthoxylum dumosum A.Rich. (Cuba)
- Zanthoxylum echinocarpum Hemsl. (southern China)
- Zanthoxylum ekmanii (Urb.) Alain (southern Mexico to southern tropical America, western Cuba)
- Zanthoxylum eliasii D.M.Porter (Panama to Peru)
- Zanthoxylum engleri Waterm.
- Zanthoxylum esquirolii H.Lév. (southern central China)
- Zanthoxylum externum (Skottsb.) Stuessy
- Zanthoxylum fagara (L.) Sarg. – Lime prickly ash (tropical and subtropical America)
- Zanthoxylum fauriei (Nakai) Ohwi – lesser ailanthus-like prickly ash (South Korea, Japan)
- Zanthoxylum finlaysonianum Wall. (Thailand)
- Zanthoxylum flavum Vahl – West Indian satinwood (Caribbean)
- Zanthoxylum foliolosum Donn.Sm. (Mexico to Nicaragua)
- Zanthoxylum forbesii T.G.Hartley (Sumatra)
- Zanthoxylum formiciferum (Cuatrec.) P.G.Waterman (Colombia to northern Peru)
- Zanthoxylum gardneri Engl. (Brazil)
- Zanthoxylum gentryi Reynel (western Colombia)
- Zanthoxylum ghisbreghtii Turcz. (Gulf of Mexico)
- Zanthoxylum gillespieanum (A.C.Sm) A.C.Sm. (Fiji)
- Zanthoxylum gilletii (De Wild.) P.G.Waterman (tropical Africa)
- Zanthoxylum glomeratum C.C.Huang (China)
- Zanthoxylum grandifolium Tul. (Colombia)
- Zanthoxylum haitiense (Urb.) J.Jiménez Alm. (Haiti)
- Zanthoxylum hamadryadicum Pirani (north-eastern Brazil)
- Zanthoxylum harrisii P.Wilson (Jamaica)
- Zanthoxylum hartii [(Krug & Urb.) P.Wilson (Jamaica)
- Zanthoxylum hawaiiense Hillebr. – a'e, Hawai'i prickly ash (Hawaii)
- Zanthoxylum heitzii (Aubrév. & Pellegr.) P.G.Waterm. (west central tropical Africa
- Zanthoxylum heterophyllum (Lam.) Sm. (Mascarenes)
- Zanthoxylum holtzianum (Engl.) P.G.Waterman (southern Somalia to northern Mozambique)
- Zanthoxylum huberi P.G.Waterman (South America)
- Zanthoxylum humile (E.A.Bruce P.G.Waterman (Zimbabwe to Mozambique and Mpumalanga)
- Zanthoxylum impressinervium Reynel (Colombia)
- Zanthoxylum integrifoliolum Elmer (Taiwan to the Philippines)
- Zanthoxylum iwahigense Reynel (the Philippines)
- Zanthoxylum jamaicense P.Wilson (Jamaica)
- Zanthoxylum juniperinum Poepp. (Central America)
- Zanthoxylum kauaense A.Gray – Kauai prickly ash (Hawaii)
- Zanthoxylum khasianum Hook.f. (Assam to China (W. Yunnan))
- Zanthoxylum kleinii (R.S.Cowan) P.G.Waterman (Brazil)
- Zanthoxylum kwangsiense (Hand.-Mazz.) Chun ex C.C.Huang (China)
- Zanthoxylum laetum Drake (China to Vietnam)
- Zanthoxylum laurentii (De Wild.) P.G.Waterman (Congo to Democratic Republic of Congo)
- Zanthoxylum leiboicum C.C.Huang (China)
- Zanthoxylum lemairei (De Wild.) P.G.Waterman (western tropical Africa to Uganda)
- Zanthoxylum lenticellosum (Urb. & Ekman) J.Jiménez Alm. (Dominican Republic)
- Zanthoxylum lenticulare Reynel (Colombia to Venezuela)
- Zanthoxylum lepidopteriphilum Reynel (Ecuador to Peru, north-west Venezuela)
- Zanthoxylum leprieurii Guill. & Perr. (tropical and southern Africa)
- Zanthoxylum leratii Guillaumin (New Caledonia)
- Zanthoxylum liboense C.C.Huang (China)
- Zanthoxylum limoncello Planch. & Oerst. (Mexico to Colombia)
- Zanthoxylum lindense (Engl.) Kokwaro (Tanzania)
- Zanthoxylum macranthum (Hand.-Mazz.) C.C. Huang (south-east Tibet to southern China)
- Zanthoxylum madagascariense Baker (Madagascar)
- Zanthoxylum magnifasciculatum Reynel (Venezuela)
- Zanthoxylum mananarense H.Perrier (Madagascar)
- Zanthoxylum mantaro (J.F.Macbr.) J.F.Macbr. (Peru)
- Zanthoxylum maranionense Reynel (Peru)
- Zanthoxylum martinicense (Lam.) DC. – white prickly ash
- Zanthoxylum mayu Bertero (Juan Fernández Islands)
- Zanthoxylum megistophyllum (B.L.Burtt) T.G.Hartley (Solomon Islands)
- Zanthoxylum melanostictum Schltdl. & Cham. (Mexico to north-west Venezuela and Peru)
- Zanthoxylum mezoneurispinosum (Aké Assi) W.D.Hawth. (Liberia to Ivory Coast)
- Zanthoxylum micranthum Hemsl. (China)
- Zanthoxylum mildbraedii (Engl.) P.G.Waterman (east central tropical Africa to south-west Kenya
- Zanthoxylum minahassae Koord. (Sulawesi)
- Zanthoxylum molle Rehder (China)
- Zanthoxylum mollissimum (Engl.) P.Wilson (Mexico to Colombia)
- Zanthoxylum monogynum A.St.-Hil. (eastern Bolivia to Brazil)
- Zanthoxylum motuoense C.C.Huang
- Zanthoxylum multijugum Franch. (China)
- Zanthoxylum myriacanthum Wall. ex Hook.f. (eastern Himalaya to southern China and western and central Malesia)
- Zanthoxylum myrianthum (A.C.Sm.) P.G.Waterman (Fiji)
- Zanthoxylum nadeaudii Drake (French Polynesia)
- Zanthoxylum nashii P.Wilson (Cuba to Hispaniola)
- Zanthoxylum nebuletorum (Herzog) P.G.Waterman (Bolivia)
- Zanthoxylum nemorale Mart. (eastern Brazil)
- Zanthoxylum neocaledonicum Baker f. (New Caledonia)
- Zanthoxylum nigrum Mart. (Brazil)
- Zanthoxylum nitidum (Roxb.) DC. – shiny-leaf prickly ash (tropical and subtropical Asia, Queensland)
- Zanthoxylum novoguineense T.G.Hartley (New Guinea)
- Zanthoxylum oahuense Hillebr. – Oahu prickly ash (Hawaii)
- Zanthoxylum ovalifolium Wight (Andaman Island, Bangladesh, Myanmar, Queensland)
- Zanthoxylum ovatifoliolatum (Engl.) Finkelstein (Angola to north-west Namibia)
- Zanthoxylum oxyphyllum Edgew. (Nepal to China and Myanmar)
- Zanthoxylum panamense P.Wilson (Mexico to Central America)
- Zanthoxylum pancheri P.S.Green (New Caledonia)
- Zanthoxylum paniculatum Balf.f. (Rodrigues in Mauritius)
- Zanthoxylum paracanthum (Mildbr.) Kokwaro (south-east Kenya to central Tanzania)
- Zanthoxylum paulae (Albuq.) P.G. Waterman (Guianas to northern Brazil)
- Zanthoxylum pentandrum (Aubl.) R.A.Howard (Trinidad to northern Brazil)
- Zanthoxylum petenense Lundell (Mexico to Guatemala)
- Zanthoxylum petiolare A.St.-Hil. & Tul. (Bolivia to Brazil and northern Argentina)
- Zanthoxylum piasezkii Maxim. (China)
- Zanthoxylum pilosiusculum (Engl.) P.G.Waterman (Democratic Republic of Congo to Angola)
- Zanthoxylum pilosulum Rehder & E.H.Wilson (south-central China)
- Zanthoxylum pimpinelloides (Lam.) DC. (Cuba to Hispaniola)
- Zanthoxylum pinnatum (J.R.Forst. & G.Forst.) W.R.B.Oliv. (Norfolk Island, Lord Howe Island, south-west Pacific.)
- Zanthoxylum piperitum (L.) DC. (China to South Korea, Japan)
- Zanthoxylum phyllopterum (Griseb.) Wright (Cuba)
- Zanthoxylum piasezkii Maxim.
- Zanthoxylum pilosiusculum (Engl.) P.G.Waterm.
- Zanthoxylum pilosulum Rehder & E.H. Wilson
- Zanthoxylum pimpinelloides (Lam.) DC.
- Zanthoxylum pinnatum Druce
- Zanthoxylum piperitum (L.) DC. – Japanese pepper, chopi, Korean pepper (China, Japan, Korea)
- Zanthoxylum pluviatile T.G.Hartley (New Guinea and Solomon Islands)
- Zanthoxylum poggei (Engl.) P.G.Waterman (western central tropical Africa)
- Zanthoxylum psammophilum (Aké Assi) P.G.Waterman (Ivory Coast)
- Zanthoxylum pseudoxyphyllum Babu (Ivory Coast)
- Zanthoxylum pteracanthum Rehder & E.H.Wilson (China)
- Zanthoxylum pucro D.M Porter (Panama to north-west Colombia)
- Zanthoxylum punctatum Vahl – dotted prickly ash (Caribbean)
- Zanthoxylum quassiifolium (Donn.Sm.) Standl. & Steyerm. (Mexico to Guatemala.)
- Zanthoxylum quinduense Tul. (western South America to north-west Venezuela)
- Zanthoxylum renieri (G.C.C.Gilbert) P.G.Waterman (Democratic Republic of Congo to Uganda)
- Zanthoxylum retroflexum T.G.Hartley (Sumatra)
- Zanthoxylum retusum (Albuq.) P.G.Waterman (Brazil)
- Zanthoxylum rhetsa (Roxb.) DC. – Cape yellowwood, Indian ivy-rue, Indian pepper (tropical Asia, Queensland)
- Zanthoxylum rhodoxylum (Urb.) P.Wilson (Jamaica)
- Zanthoxylum rhoifolium Lam. (tropical and subtropical America)
- Zanthoxylum rhombifoliolatum C.C.Huang (China)
- Zanthoxylum riedelianum Engl. (Brazil to north-east Argentina)
- Zanthoxylum rigidum Humb. & Bonpl. ex Willd. (western South America to Paraguay)
- Zanthoxylum rubescens Planch. ex Hook. (western tropical Africa to south-west Kenya and Angola)
- Zanthoxylum sapindifolium Wall. (Myanmar)
- Zanthoxylum sarasinii Guillaumin (New Caledonia)
- Zanthoxylum scandens Blume (southern China to Nansei-shoto and western Malesia)
- Zanthoxylum schinifolium Siebold & Zucc. – mastic-leaf prickly ash, Sichuan pepper (central and eastern China to temperate eastern Asia)
- Zanthoxylum schlechteri Guillaumin (New Caledonia)
- Zanthoxylum schreberi (J.F.Gmel.) Reynel ex C.Nelson (Mexico to Venezuela and Bolivia, Caribbean)
- Zanthoxylum setulosum P.Wilson (Costa Rica to north-west Venezuela)
- Zanthoxylum simulans Hance (China, South Korea, Taiwan)
- Zanthoxylum spinosum (Sw.) Sw. (Florida to Caribbean)
- Zanthoxylum spondiifolium Wall. (Myanmar)
- Zanthoxylum sprucei Engl. (Ecuador to Peru and western Brazil)
- Zanthoxylum stelligerum Turcz. (central and eastern Brazil)
- Zanthoxylum stenophyllum Hemsl. (central and eastern central China)
- Zanthoxylum subspicatum H. Perrier (Madagascar)
- Zanthoxylum syncarpum (Tul.) Tul. ex B.D.Jacks. (Venezuela, eastern Brazil)
- Zanthoxylum taediosum A.Rich. (Cuba)
- Zanthoxylum tahitense (Nadeaud) J.Florence & N.Hallé (Society Islands)
- Zanthoxylum tambopatense Reynel (Peru)
- Zanthoxylum tetraphyllum (urb. & Ekman) J.Jiménez Alm. (Haiti)
- Zanthoxylum tetraspermum Wight & Arn. (southern India, Sri Lanka)
- Zanthoxylum thomense (Engl.) A.Chev. ex P.G.Waterman (Gabon and Gulf of Guinea Island)
- Zanthoxylum thornycroftii (I.Verd.) P.G.Waterman (Limpopo to Mpumalanga)
- Zanthoxylum thouventii H.Perrier (Madagascar])
- Zanthoxylum tidorense Miq. (Maluku Islands)
- Zanthoxylum timoriense Span. (Lesser Sunda Islands)
- Zanthoxylum tingoassuiba A.St.-Hil. (eastern and southern Brazil)
- Zanthoxylum tomentellum Hook.f. (Nepal to China and Myanmar)
- Zanthoxylum tragodes (L.) DC. – Niaragato (Caribbean)
- Zanthoxylum trijugum (Dunkley) P.G.Waterman (central Tanzania to Zambia)
- Zanthoxylum tsihanimposa H.Perrier (Madagascar)
- Zanthoxylum undulatifolium Hemsl. (China)
- Zanthoxylum unifoliatum Groppo & Pirani (Brazil)
- Zanthoxylum usambarense (Engl.) Kokwara (Ethiopia to Rwanda)
- Zanthoxylum usitatum Pierre ex Laness. (Vietnam)
- Zanthoxylum venosum Leonard (Hispaniola)
- Zanthoxylum verrucosum (Cuatrec.) P.G.Waterman (Colombia to Ecuador)
- Zanthoxylum vinkii T.G.Hartley (New Guinea)
- Zanthoxylum viride (A.Chev.) T.G.Hartley (west tropical Africa to Congo)
- Zanthoxylum vitiense A.C.Sm. (Fiji)
- Zanthoxylum wutaiense I.S.Chen (Taiwan)
- Zanthoxylum xichouense C.C.Huang (China)
- Zanthoxylum yakumontanum (Sugim.) Nagam. (Japan)
- Zanthoxylum yuanjiangensis C.C.Huang (China)
- Zanthoxylum zanthoxyloides (Lam.) Zepern. & Timler – Senegal prickly ash (western tropical Africa)

=== Unplaced species ===
The genus Fagara has been sunk into Zanthoxylum, but as of January 2025, no name seemed to have been provided for Fagara externa, which was regarded as an unplaced name by Plants of the World Online.
