= Zanthoxylum pilosulum =

Scientific classification
- Kingdom: Plantae
- Clade: Tracheophytes
- Clade: Angiosperms
- Clade: Eudicots
- Clade: Rosids
- Order: Sapindales
- Family: Rutaceae
- Genus: Zanthoxylum
- Species: Z. pilosulum

Binomial name
- Zanthoxylum pilosulum Rehd. et Wils.

Species of plant

Zanthoxylum pilosulum (Chinese: 微柔毛花椒) is a woody plant from the Rutaceae family native to western and northwestern Sichuan and southern Shaanxi and Gansu provinces, China.

== Description ==
Zanthoxylum pilosulum grows as a shrub, reaching a height of 1–2 meters. Its branches are strong and straight with a flat base, covered with hairs (trichomes), and bear many spines and internodes. The petioles are slender and the leaflets are small and sessile. Each leaf has 7 to 11 leaflets, each measuring 0.5–3 cm long and 0.4-1.5 cm wide, except for the terminal leaflet, which measures 5 cm long and 2.5 cm wide. They are ovate to elliptical and the edges are crenate. After drying, the leaves are pale green with a papery texture, and the lateral and branch veins are clearly visible on the surface. There are oil glands in the leaf margin cracks, which can allow Z. pilosulum to be distinguished from its relative Zanthoxylum piasezkii.

The flowers are terminal, with 5 to 8 tepals per flower, and the rachis is short and shaggy. On the male flower the tepals are lanceolate, measuring 1.2-1.5 mm long and 2 to 3 times as wide. The male flower has 5-6 stamens. The female flowers generally have 4 carpels, but occasionally they have only 3 or, rarely, 2. The fruit follicles are purple-red in color with a diameter of 4–5 mm and occasional protruding oil glands. The seeds are similar in shape to, but smaller than, those of Zanthoxylum bungeanum. The flowering period is from April to May, and the fruiting period is from July to August. The plant grows in arid mountain areas at an altitude of 2500–2700 meters.
