= Zanthoxylum khasianum =

Scientific classification
- Kingdom: Plantae
- Clade: Tracheophytes
- Clade: Angiosperms
- Clade: Eudicots
- Clade: Rosids
- Order: Sapindales
- Family: Rutaceae
- Genus: Zanthoxylum
- Species: Z. khasianum

Binomial name
- Zanthoxylum khasianum Hook. f.

Species of plant

Zanthoxylum khasianum is woody plant in the family Rutaceae native to Attam and South Central China.

== Description ==
Zanthoxylum khasianum is a scattered shrub. Branches and leaves are glabrous, with a few short spines or no spines. Leaves have 5-9 leaflets; leaflets alternate, thick paper, entire, lanceolate or oblong, sparsely ovoid, apex is long acuminate or caudate, apex is round or slightly concave, 6-12 cm long, 2.5-5 cm wide, with many oil spots, yellow or light brown after drying, obvious depression on the leaf surface, visible under an enlarged microscope, leaf veins reticulate, embossed on the leaf surface, hidden on the back of the leaf; petiole length 4 -8 mm, the leaf shaft is flat on the ventral surface or has a narrow leaf qualitative edge. The cymes are axillary, the female inflorescence is 2-6 cm long; the pedicel is 1-2 mm long and pilose; the sepals and petals are 4 pieces; the petals are oval-shaped, yellowish green, and about 3 mm long. Infructescence is spherical or conical, fruit stalk is 5-8 mm long; individual lobules are about 7 mm long, without awn tip, light yellow or brownish yellow after drying, oil spots are often slightly sunken; seed diameter is about 6 mm, Dark brown, bright. Flowering in April, fruiting in September.
