= Zanthoxylum holtzianum =

Conservation status
- Vulnerable (IUCN 2.3)

Scientific classification
- Kingdom: Plantae
- Clade: Tracheophytes
- Clade: Angiosperms
- Clade: Eudicots
- Clade: Rosids
- Order: Sapindales
- Family: Rutaceae
- Genus: Zanthoxylum
- Species: Z. holtzianumg

Binomial name
- Zanthoxylum holtzianumg (Engl.) P.G.Waterman

Synonyms
- Fagara holtziana Engl.; Fagara holtziana var. puguensis Engl.; Fagara somalensis Chiov.; Zanthoxylum somalense (Chiov.) P.G.Waterman

Species of flowering plant

Zanthoxylum holtzianum is a species of plant in the family Rutaceae. It is endemic to Tanzania.
