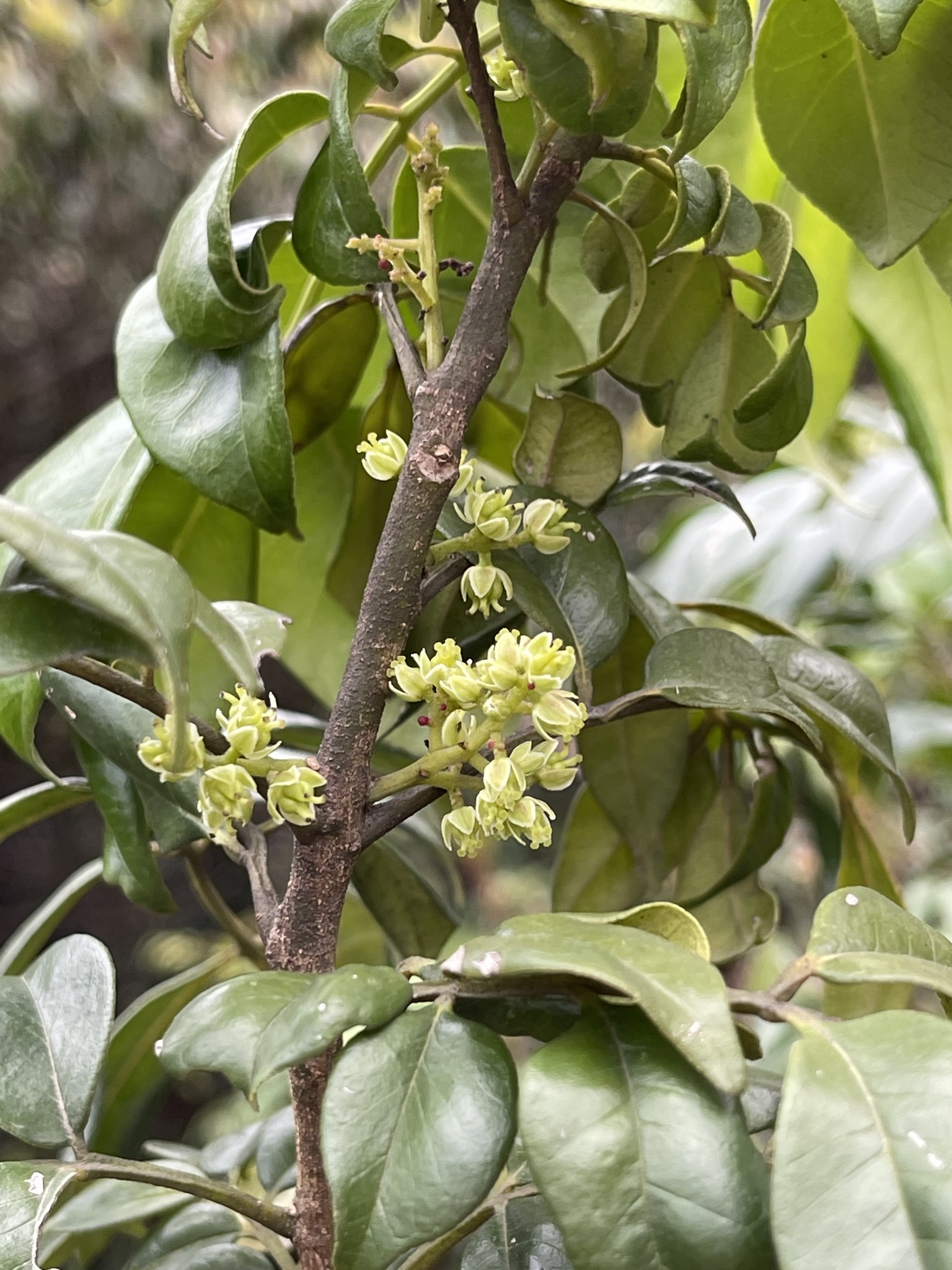

Scientific classification
- Kingdom: Plantae
- Clade: Tracheophytes
- Clade: Angiosperms
- Clade: Eudicots
- Clade: Rosids
- Order: Sapindales
- Family: Rutaceae
- Genus: Zanthoxylum
- Species: Z. scandens

Binomial name
- Zanthoxylum scandens Blume

Synonyms
- List: Fagara scandens (Blume) Engl.; Fagara chinensis Merr.; Fagara cuspidata (Champ. ex Benth.) Engl.; Fagara cyrtorhachia Hayata; Fagara laxifoliolata Hayata; Fagara leiorhachia Hayata; Zanthoxylum chinense (Merr.) T.H.Chung; Zanthoxylum cuspidatum Champ. ex Benth.; Zanthoxylum cyrtorbachium (Hayata) C.C.Huang; Zanthoxylum laxifoliolatum (Hayata) C.C.Huang; Zanthoxylum leiorhachium (Hayata) C.C.Huang; Zanthoxylum liukiuense Hayata

= Zanthoxylum scandens =

Species of plant

Zanthoxylum scandens is a species of woody plant in the family Rutaceae.

== Description ==
Zanthoxylum scandens is a woody plant, observed as a shrub or woody climber. It has a self-supporting growth form, with individual plants growing up to 24 metres (79 feet). Prickles can be found on its trunks, branches, branchlets, and leaf rachises. Flowers are tetramerous, with a perianth in two series. It sepals have been found as pale purplish green in color, ovate in shape, and about 0.5 millimetres (0.020 inches) in size. Male flowers have four stamens, are about three to four millimeters in size, and have a spot at their apex. Female flowers have three carpels with ligulate staminodes. Fruit follicles have been observed as purplish red in color, but grayish brown to black when dry. Seeds are about four to five millimeters in diameter. The species typically flowers from March to May, and fruits from to July to August.

== Distribution and habitat ==
Zanthoxylum scandens is found in China (southern Anhui, Chongqing, Fujian, Guangdong, Guangxi, Guizhou, Hainan, Hubei, Hunan, Jiangxi, Sichuan, Yunnan, Zhejiang), India, Indonesia, Japan, Laos, Malaysia, Myanmar, Taiwan and Vietnam.

Its preferred habitats are lowland forests, open forests, and thickets from an elevation at near sea level to 1,500 metres (4,921 feet).

== Taxonomy ==
The species was first published in Carl Ludwig von Blume's Bijdragen tot de Flora van Nederlandsch Indie in 1825 and is widely accepted as a valid species.
