= Zanthoxylum austrosinense =

Scientific classification
- Kingdom: Plantae
- Clade: Embryophytes
- Clade: Tracheophytes
- Clade: Spermatophytes
- Clade: Angiosperms
- Clade: Eudicots
- Clade: Rosids
- Order: Sapindales
- Family: Rutaceae
- Genus: Zanthoxylum
- Species: Z. austrosinense

Binomial name
- Zanthoxylum austrosinense Huang

Species of flowering plant

Zanthoxylum austrosinense, or South Chinese Sichuan pepper, is a woody plant in the family Rutaceae and is native to southern China.

== Characteristics ==
Small trees or shrubs, up to 3 meters high; branches brown-black, few or thorny, and all parts are glabrous. The axis of the river is round and the leaves have 5-11 leaflets; the leaflets have no or few stalks except for a small stalk with a length of 1–3 cm in the center of the top. The leaflets are neatly opposite, and the 2 lobules rarely located at the base are alternate. Lanceolate, usually ovoid at the base of the leaf shaft, 6–11 cm long, 3–5 cm wide, tapered at the top, round or nearly heart-shaped at the base, or round on one side and slanting upward on the other side, oily The spots are clear, dark reddish-brown to brown-black after drying, with cracked teeth on the leaf margin, and the midrib is slightly sunken or flat on the leaf surface, with 11-15 side veins on each side. The inflorescence is terminal, usually born on the top of the lateral branches, with sparsely more than 30 flowers; pedicel 5–8 mm; flowers are unisexual, sometimes bisexual (the same plant is heterosexual); tepals 7–9, approximately arranged in two rounds, The size of each slice is slightly different, lanceolate, sometimes oblanceolate, about 1.5 mm long, dark purple-red upper part, yellowish green lower part; 3-4 stamens of bisexual flowers; carpel 4 The male flowers have 6-8 stamens; the female flowers have 3-4 carpels, the style is longer than the ovary, slightly dorsally curved, and the stigma is capitate. The fruit stalk is dark purple-red, 1–2 cm long; the lobular petals are the same color as the fruit stalk, about 5 mm in diameter, with a few slightly raised oil spots, and the awn tip is very short; the seeds are about 4 mm long and 3–4 mm thick, The top is slightly pointed. Flowering period from March to April, fruiting period from August to September. Grows in Jiangxi (Anyuan, Dayu, Chongyi), Hunan (in southern Hunan), Fujian (Mount Wuyi, Yongtai), Guangdong (Ruyuan), Guangxi (near Guilin). Seen in sloping forests or bushes at an altitude of 300–900 meters. Plants born in limestone mountains often take the form of small shrubs.

== Varieties ==
South Chinese Sichuan pepper (wild type) var. austrosinense

The leaflets are glabrous, dark reddish brown to brownish black after drying. Type specimens were collected from Ruyuan, Guangdong. Both the root and stem bark are used as herbal medicine. The inner skin of the root is yellow, pungent, spicy, and fragrant. Warm in nature, it has the effects of expelling wind, detoxification, relieving the surface, dispelling blood stasis and reducing swelling. Proper dosage will not cause poisoning. The root contains benzophenanthridines and quinolines. Alkaloids: dictamnine. dimethylaheleryth-rine, austrosinensine, 8-hydroxydictamine (also known as robustine), etc. The latter has a strong inhibitory effect on Staphylococcus aureus. It also contains acids such as triacontanol caproic acid and proline acid l-proline of aminocephalic acid. The leaf shafts and midribs of the young leaves are dark purple-red. Plants collected from limestone mountains are often pale green or yellow-green after being pressed dry, while those collected from other habitats are often dark reddish brown to reddish black. The specimens collected from Changxi have unisexual flowers and bisexual flowers, which are heterosexual plants of the same plant.

Hairy Leaf South Chinese Sichuan pepper (variety) var. pubescens Huang in Acta Phytotax. Sin. 16: 82. 1978.

The leaflets have coarse, short hairs, which are dark green when dried. Grown in Sangzhi County in Hunan (origin of type specimen). It can be found under the forest of mixed trees in the mountains at an altitude of about 1700 meters.
