= Zanthoxylum collinsiae =

Scientific classification
- Kingdom: Plantae
- Clade: Embryophytes
- Clade: Tracheophytes
- Clade: Spermatophytes
- Clade: Angiosperms
- Clade: Eudicots
- Clade: Rosids
- Order: Sapindales
- Family: Rutaceae
- Genus: Zanthoxylum
- Species: Z. collinsiae

Binomial name
- Zanthoxylum collinsiae Craib

Synonyms
- Zanthoxylum asperum C.C.Huang; Zanthoxylum scabrum Guillaumin

Species of plant

Zanthoxylum collinsiae is a woody plant in the family Rutaceae, its native range is Yunnan, Guizhou, and Guangxi in China to Indo-China.
