= Zanthoxylum nadeaudii =

Conservation status
- Endangered (IUCN 3.1)

Scientific classification
- Kingdom: Plantae
- Clade: Embryophytes
- Clade: Tracheophytes
- Clade: Angiosperms
- Clade: Eudicots
- Clade: Rosids
- Order: Sapindales
- Family: Rutaceae
- Genus: Zanthoxylum
- Species: Z. nadeaudii

Binomial name
- Zanthoxylum nadeaudii Drake (1890)

Species of flowering plant

Zanthoxylum nadeaudii is a species of plant in the family Rutaceae. It is native to the Society Islands in French Polynesia.
