= Zanthoxylum molle =

Scientific classification
- Kingdom: Plantae
- Clade: Tracheophytes
- Clade: Angiosperms
- Clade: Eudicots
- Clade: Rosids
- Order: Sapindales
- Family: Rutaceae
- Genus: Zanthoxylum
- Species: Z. molle

Binomial name
- Zanthoxylum molle Rehd.

Species of plant

Zanthoxylum molle (Chinese: 朵花椒) is a woody plant from the Rutaceae family.

== Description ==
Z. molle is a deciduous tree with a height of 10 meters. The bark is brown and black. The tender branches are dark, purplish red. The stems have sharp spikes. The inflorescence rachis and the tops of the branches are scattered, with many short, straight thorns. The pith of the tender branches is large and hollow. The leaf shafts are round and often short-haired. The leaves have 13-19 small leaves, usually 5-11 that are born on the top branchlets. The small leaves are opposite, almost sessile. They are thick, broad oval or elliptical in shape, sometimes round. They are 8-15 cm long, 4-9 cm wide, sharply pointed at the top, round or slightly heart-shaped at the base, symmetrical on both sides, sparsely slanted on one side, whole or with finely cracked teeth. The midrib is sunken in the leaf surface, which has 11-17 side veins on each side.

The back of the leaf is densely covered with white-gray or yellow-gray felt-like hairs, and the oil spots are not obvious or sparse, which can be seen under the enlarged lens. The inflorescence is terminal and multi-flowered; the total pedicel often has sharp spines; the pedicel is light purple-red, densely short-haired; 5 sepals and petals are each; petals are white, 2-3 mm long; the pistil of the male flower is about as long as the petals, Top and lobed. Female flowers have extremely short staminodes and 3 carpels. The stalk and lobular petals are light purple-red, light yellowish gray to gray-brown after drying, without awn tip at the top, 4-5 mm in diameter. They have many oil spots, and are dented after drying. The seed diameter is 3.5-4 mm. The inner cortex of the bark is light brown-yellow; the wood is light yellow-white.

The flowering period is from June to August, fruiting from October to November.

== Habitat ==
Z. molle is native to South China (Anhui, Zhejiang, Jiangxi, Hunan, Shanghai, and Guizhou). It is found in dry forests or bushes in hilly areas 100-700 meters above sea level.

== Applications ==
The bark is used as "sea tong bark" (see Chinese Zanthoxylum bungeanum). The leaf contains 0.1% volatile oil; the fruit contains 0.45%.
