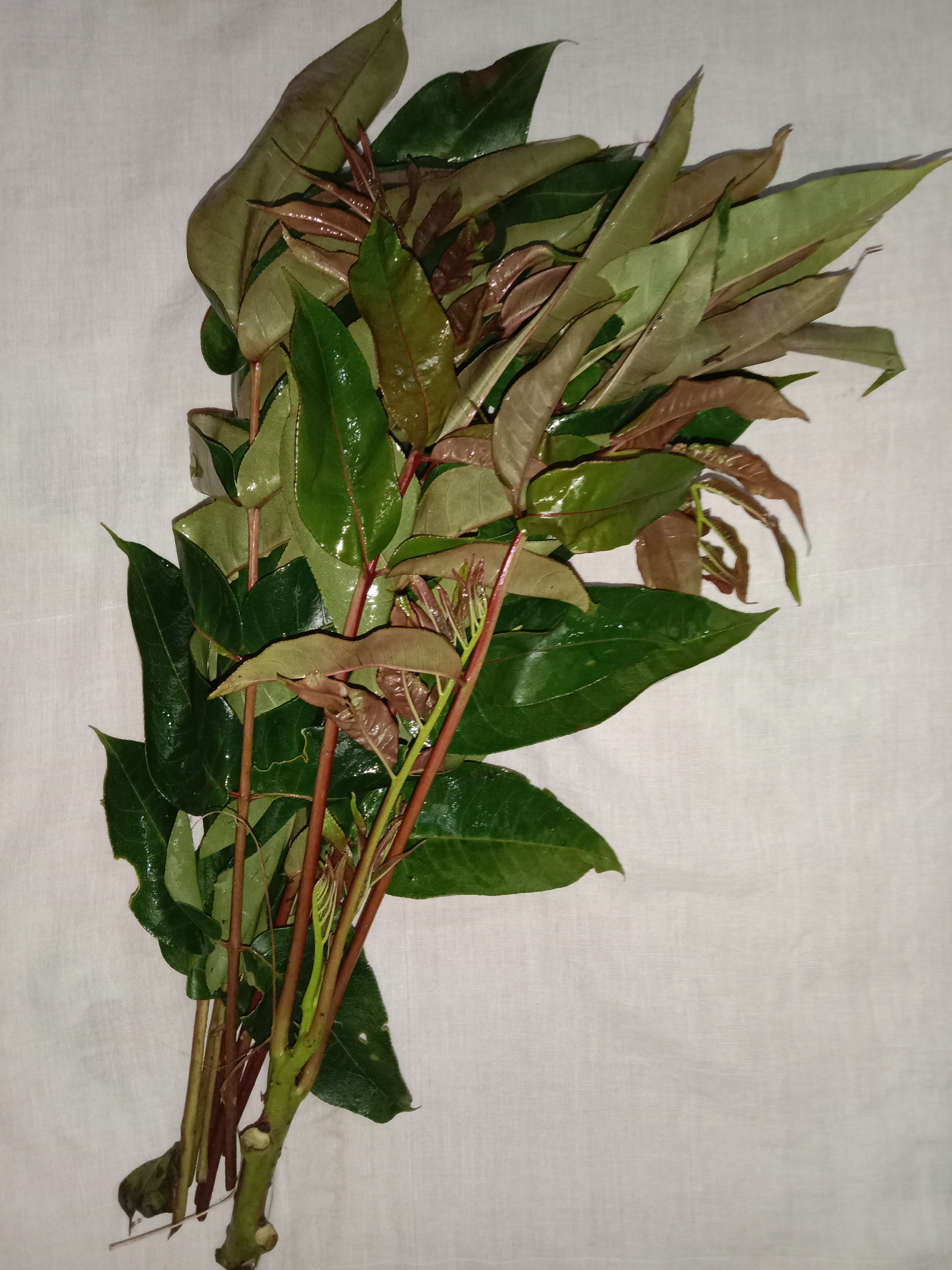

Scientific classification
- Kingdom: Plantae
- Clade: Tracheophytes
- Clade: Angiosperms
- Clade: Eudicots
- Clade: Rosids
- Order: Sapindales
- Family: Rutaceae
- Genus: Zanthoxylum
- Species: Z. oxyphyllum

Binomial name
- Zanthoxylum oxyphyllum Edgeworth

= Zanthoxylum oxyphyllum =

Species of plant

Zanthoxylum oxyphyllum (Chinese: 尖叶花椒) is a tree from the family Rutaceae.

== Description ==
Zanthoxylum oxyphyllum is a small deciduous tree found Bhutan, NE India, Myanmar, Nepal.

== Classification ==
The species was published in Transactions of the Linnean Society of London in 1846.
