= Zanthoxylum mollissimum =

Conservation status
- Least Concern (IUCN 3.1)

Scientific classification
- Kingdom: Plantae
- Clade: Tracheophytes
- Clade: Angiosperms
- Clade: Eudicots
- Clade: Rosids
- Order: Sapindales
- Family: Rutaceae
- Genus: Zanthoxylum
- Species: Z. mollissimum

Binomial name
- Zanthoxylum mollissimum (Engl.) P.Wilson

Synonyms
- Fagara mollissima Engl.; Zanthoxylum dugandii Standl.; Zanthoxylum ferrugineum Radlk.; Zanthoxylum matudae Lundell

Species of flowering plant

Zanthoxylum mollissimum is a species of plant in the family Rutaceae. It is found in Belize, Costa Rica, El Salvador, Guatemala, Honduras, Nicaragua, and Panama.
