= Zanthoxylum spinosum subsp. hartii =

Conservation status
- Vulnerable (IUCN 2.3)

Scientific classification
- Kingdom: Plantae
- Clade: Tracheophytes
- Clade: Angiosperms
- Clade: Eudicots
- Clade: Rosids
- Order: Sapindales
- Family: Rutaceae
- Genus: Zanthoxylum
- Species: Z. spinosum
- Subspecies: Z. s. subsp. hartii

Trinomial name
- Zanthoxylum spinosum subsp. hartii (Krug & Urb.) Reynel

Synonyms
- Fagara hartii Krug & Urb.; Zanthoxylum hartii (Krug & Urb.) P.Wilson

Subspecies of flowering plant

Zanthoxylum spinosum subsp. hartii is a species of plant in the family Rutaceae. It is endemic to Jamaica.
