= Zanthoxylum wutaiense =

Scientific classification
- Kingdom: Plantae
- Clade: Tracheophytes
- Clade: Angiosperms
- Clade: Eudicots
- Clade: Rosids
- Order: Sapindales
- Family: Rutaceae
- Genus: Zanthoxylum
- Species: Z. wutaiense

Binomial name
- Zanthoxylum wutaiense Chen, 1972

Species of plant

Zanthoxylum wutaiense (Chinese: 屏東花椒, ping dong hua jiao, Pingtung County prickly ash) is a woody plant from the family Rutaceae. It is native to Pingtung County, Taiwan.

== Description ==
Zanthozylum wutaiense is a shrub with glabrous branches and barbed spines. The leaf has 5–13 leaflets, with narrow wing leaves near the top of the leaf axis; the leaflets are opposite, sessile, leathery, oblong to oblong-lanceolate, 3–10 cm long and 1–2 cm wide. The top of the leaflet is acuminate and the base tapered or wedge-pointed. There are 7–16 lateral veins on each side, and the midribs are convex on both sides of the leaf. The edge of the leaf has blunt teeth, with oil glands in the teeth. The flowers are yellow and form axillary panicles; the peduncle is 3 mm long. The male flower has 5–8 tepals and stamens; the ovary of the female flower is ovoid and oblong, with 1 or sometimes 2 carpels, a short style and a capitate stigma. The fruit is ovoid and about 5 mm in diameter.
