= Zanthoxylum heterophyllum =

Conservation status
- Critically Endangered (IUCN 2.3)

Scientific classification
- Kingdom: Plantae
- Clade: Tracheophytes
- Clade: Angiosperms
- Clade: Eudicots
- Clade: Rosids
- Order: Sapindales
- Family: Rutaceae
- Genus: Zanthoxylum
- Species: Z. heterophyllum

Binomial name
- Zanthoxylum heterophyllum (Lam.) Smith

Species of flowering plant

Zanthoxylum heterophyllum is a species of plant in the family Rutaceae. It is found in Mauritius and Réunion. It is threatened by habitat loss. A large tree reaching 30 to 50 cm in diameter, the timber was formerly used for house construction. The International Union for Conservation of Nature has listed it as critically endangered since 1998.

This species also occurred in Rodrigues, where it had been eradicated. In Mauritius, in 2013, less than 40 individuals were known in the wild.

Schmelzer and Gurib-Fakim record that Zanthoxylum heterophyllum, known as bois de poivre (pepper wood), in reference to the taste of the fruit and/or its peppercorn appearance, was a medicinal plant in Réunion. The stem bark decoction was a sudorific, purgative, tonic and stomachic, to treat rheumatism, kidney pain, dysentery and toothache. For the latter ash of the stem bark relieved pain, and tea of the leaves, which are distinctly different between young and adult plants, was taken to increase milk flow of nursing mothers, and was externally applied to skin irritations.
