= Zanthoxylum micranthum =

Conservation status
- Least Concern (IUCN 3.1)

Scientific classification
- Kingdom: Plantae
- Clade: Tracheophytes
- Clade: Angiosperms
- Clade: Eudicots
- Clade: Rosids
- Order: Sapindales
- Family: Rutaceae
- Genus: Zanthoxylum
- Species: Z. micranthum

Binomial name
- Zanthoxylum micranthum Hemsl.

Synonyms
- Fagara micrantha (Hemsl.) Engl.; Fagara biondii Pamp.

Species of plant

Zanthoxylum micranthum (Chinese: 小花花椒, xiao hua hua jiao) is a woody plant in the family Rutaceae. It is native to Hubei, Hunan, Guizhou, Sichuan, and Yunnan provinces in China.

== Description ==
Zanthoxylum micranthum is a deciduous tree. It occurs in sloping forests at an altitude of 300–900 meters. It may reach 15 meters in height. Stems and branches have sparse, short, sharp thorns; the inflorescence rachis and upper branchlets have no or few thorns. First-year branches have little pith. All parts are glabrous, and the leaf shaft often has narrow leaf texture on the ventral surface edge. The leaf has 9–17 leaflets; they are opposite, though not neatly so on the lower part of the leaf shaft. Each is lanceolate, 5–8 cm long, 1–3 cm wide, tapered at the top and long pointed, round or wide at the base. They may be symmetrical or the base of one side may be round and the base of the other slightly wedge-shaped. The underside of the dried leaves is lighter in color; both sides are glabrous, with many oil glands, clearly visible when seen against the light, and the edge of the leaf has blunt or rounded teeth. The midrib is sunken, with 8–12 side veins on each side; the leaflet petiole is 1.5–5 mm long. The inflorescence is terminal and has many flowers, each with 5 sepals and petals. The sepals are wide ovate, about 0.3 mm wide; the petals are yellowish white, 1.5–2 mm long. Male flowers have 5 stamens, reaching about 3 mm long. Female flowers have a stubby pistil, three-lobed or undivided, with 3 carpels or occasionally 4. The fruit follicles are light purple-red in life, light gray-yellow or gray-brown when dried, with a diameter of about 5 mm. They have no or few awn tips on top, and small oil glands; the seed length does not exceed 4 mm. The tree flowers from July to August, fruiting from October to November.
