= Zanthoxylum externum =

Conservation status
- Critically Endangered (IUCN 3.1)

Scientific classification
- Kingdom: Plantae
- Clade: Tracheophytes
- Clade: Angiosperms
- Clade: Eudicots
- Clade: Rosids
- Order: Sapindales
- Family: Rutaceae
- Genus: Zanthoxylum
- Species: Z. externum

Binomial name
- Zanthoxylum externum (Skottsb.) Stuessy

Synonyms
- Fagara externa Skottsb.

Species of plant

Zanthoxylum externum is a species of flowering plant in the family Rutaceae. It is a tree endemic to Alejandro Selkirk Island in the Juan Fernández Islands of Chile.

It grows in lower montane myrtisilva (myrtle forests) from 400 to 700 meters elevation, where Myrceugenia schulzei is the dominant tree. According to historical records Fagara externa was once abundant, but is now scarce. In 2006 it was estimated that there are 500 to 1,000 individuals on the island, with the largest concentration in the El Blindado sector. The species' area of occupancy (AOO) is estimated to be <10 km^{2}. In 2023 the IUCN Red List assessed the species as critically endangered.
