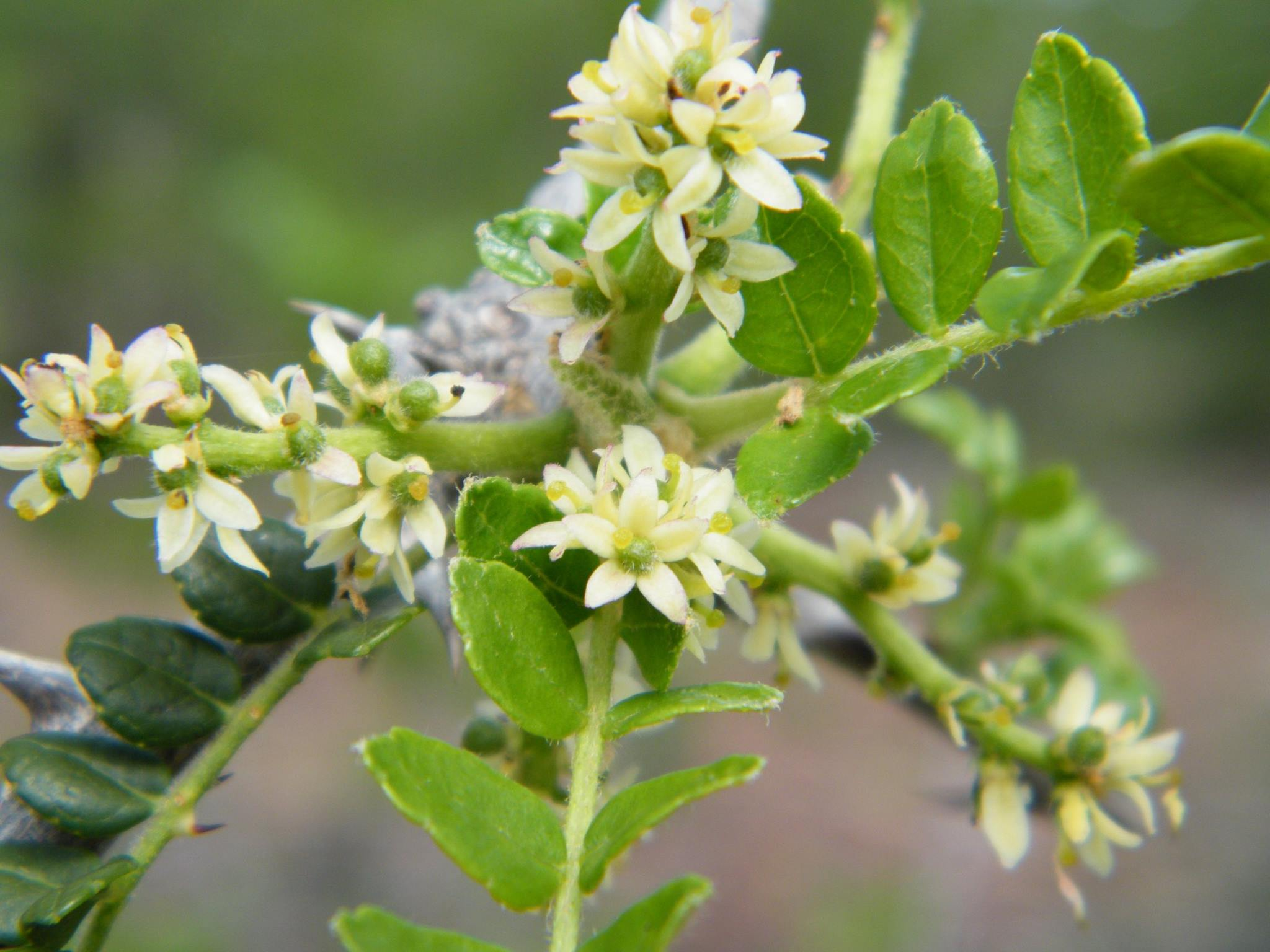

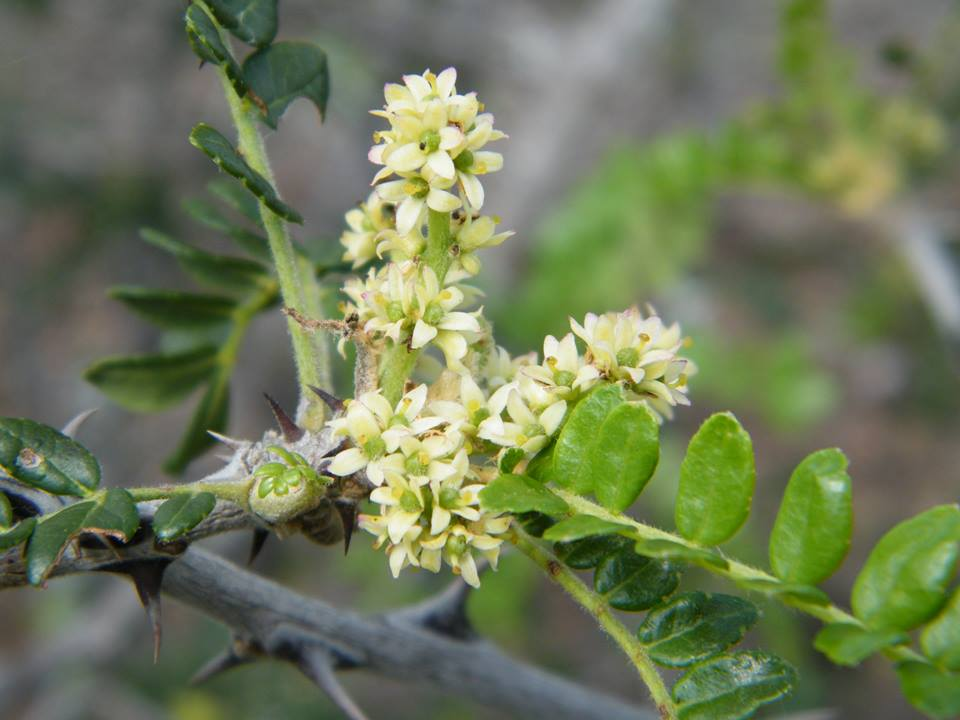

Scientific classification
- Kingdom: Plantae
- Clade: Tracheophytes
- Clade: Angiosperms
- Clade: Eudicots
- Clade: Rosids
- Order: Sapindales
- Family: Rutaceae
- Genus: Zanthoxylum
- Species: Z. humile

Binomial name
- Zanthoxylum humile (E.A.Bruce) P.G.Waterman

Synonyms
- Fagara humilis E.A.Bruce (1951)

= Zanthoxylum humile =

Species of flowering plant

Zanthoxylum humile is a dense, deciduous Southern African suffrutex to 3 m tall and a member of the family Rutaceae. It occurs in KwaZulu-Natal, Mpumalanga, Kruger National Park, Limpopo Province, Mozambique and the southern part of Zimbabwe.

It is one of some 195 species of Zanthoxylum, which have a worldwide distribution in warm, temperate and subtropical regions. Its branches and leaf rachides are pubescent to greyish tomentose, or becoming glabrous, with straight or recurved grey or reddish prickles. It is alternate and imparipinnate with 4-14 pairs of leaflets, the leaves being 4–16 cm long, with terminal buds protected by cottony scales. It is sometimes found in association with Colophospermum mopane in open woodland.

Male and female flowers are found on separate trees (dioecious), producing fruit some 5 mm in diameter holding a single black seed.
