= Zanthoxylum psammophilum =

Conservation status
- Endangered (IUCN 2.3)

Scientific classification
- Kingdom: Plantae
- Clade: Tracheophytes
- Clade: Angiosperms
- Clade: Eudicots
- Clade: Rosids
- Order: Sapindales
- Family: Rutaceae
- Genus: Zanthoxylum
- Species: Z. psammophilum

Binomial name
- Zanthoxylum psammophilum (Aké Assi) Waterman

Synonyms
- Fagara psammophila Aké Assi

Species of shrub

Zanthoxylum psammophilum is a species of shrub or small tree in the family Rutaceae. It is a large liana endemic to Côte d'Ivoire, although in 2005 it was found in Liberia as well. Zanthoxylum psammophilum, a new combination created in 1975 to subsume the genus Fagara into the genus Zanthoxylum based on morphology and secondary metabolites, is the preferred name according to the Conservatoire et Jardin botaniques de la Ville de Genève which has a section that specializes in the conservation and biodiversity of flowering plants of Côte d'Ivoire. The type specimen for the plant was collected in the ecotone between the lowland Eastern Guinean forests (tropical rainforest) and the inland Guinean forest-savanna mosaic in the Lagunes District.
