= Zanthoxylum motuoense =

Scientific classification
- Kingdom: Plantae
- Clade: Tracheophytes
- Clade: Angiosperms
- Clade: Eudicots
- Clade: Rosids
- Order: Sapindales
- Family: Rutaceae
- Genus: Zanthoxylum
- Species: Z. motuoense

Binomial name
- Zanthoxylum motuoense Huang

Species of plant

Zanthoxylum motuoense (Chinese: 墨脱花椒) is a woody plant from the Rutaceae family and is native to Medog, Tibet.

== Description ==
Z. motuoense is a deciduous tree that can reach 15 meters in height. It is characterized by its thick branches and the 1mm long thorns that often grow on the side of its leaf scars; these thicken at the base and present a cushion. It produces a single leaflet or leaf with 3 or 5 leaflets. The leaflet is broad obovate or broad-elliptic, 3–6 cm long and 2–4 cm wide, the largest in the center, 9 cm long, 6 cm wide, and the ends are often close to round, rarely sharp or wedge-shaped, with finely cracked teeth on the edge of the leaf.

Except for oil spots located at tooth gaps, other oil spots are not obvious. Both sides are pubescent, and the hairs on the back of the leaf are dense and long; the leaf shaft has no wings. There are no thorns and a dense coat. The inflorescence is drawn out at the same time as the new leaves. The infructescence is conical, 4–8 cm long, with short hairs on the peduncle; the fruit petals are oval, about 4.5 mm in diameter, and the oil spots on the pericarp are large and slightly convex; the seed diameter is about 4 mm.

The fruiting period is from September to October.

== Habitat ==
Z. motuoense is seen in the mountain forests, 1100 meters above sea level.
