= Zanthoxylum rhombifoliolatum =

Scientific classification
- Kingdom: Plantae
- Clade: Tracheophytes
- Clade: Angiosperms
- Clade: Eudicots
- Clade: Rosids
- Order: Sapindales
- Family: Rutaceae
- Genus: Zanthoxylum
- Species: Z. rhombifoliolatum

Binomial name
- Zanthoxylum rhombifoliolatum Hemsl

Species of plant

Zanthoxylum rhombifoliolatum (Chinese: 菱叶花椒)is a tree from the Rutaceae family.

== Description ==
Zanthoxylum rhombifoliolatum are shrubs that can stand from 1 to 2 meters tall. It has been found in Chongqing, Guizhou,

== Classification ==
The species was recorded in Acta Phytotax in 1957. It would later be accepted in 2008's Flora of China.
