= Zanthoxylum albuquerquei =

Conservation status
- Vulnerable (IUCN 2.3)

Scientific classification
- Kingdom: Plantae
- Clade: Tracheophytes
- Clade: Angiosperms
- Clade: Eudicots
- Clade: Rosids
- Order: Sapindales
- Family: Rutaceae
- Genus: Zanthoxylum
- Species: Z. albuquerquei

Binomial name
- Zanthoxylum albuquerquei D.R.Simpson

Species of flowering plant

Zanthoxylum albuquerquei is a species of tree in the family Rutaceae. It is endemic to Peru.

== Description ==
Trees up to 27 m tall; trunk up to 48 cm in diameter. Leaves compound, 7–8 pairs of oblong or ovate-oblong leaflets. Inflorescences are axillary panicles, 10–14 cm long; flowers small, with petals up to 2.5 mm long.

== Conservation ==
Zanthoxylum albuquerquei is considered a vulnerable species by the IUCN.
