= Zanthoxylum yuanjiangensis =

Scientific classification
- Kingdom: Plantae
- Clade: Embryophytes
- Clade: Tracheophytes
- Clade: Spermatophytes
- Clade: Angiosperms
- Clade: Eudicots
- Clade: Rosids
- Order: Sapindales
- Family: Rutaceae
- Genus: Zanthoxylum
- Species: Z. yuanjiangensis

Binomial name
- Zanthoxylum yuanjiangensis C.C.Huang

Species of plant

Zanthoxylum yuanjiangensis (Chinese: 元江花椒, Yuanjiang prickly ash) is a woody plant in the Rutaceae. It is native to Yuanjiang, Yunnan, China.

== Description ==
Z. yuanjiangensis is a climbing vine; it has short spines with scattered downward hooks. It is glabrous except for microscopic powdery puberulent hairs on the shaft and the ventral surface of the petiole and the inflorescence shaft.

The leaves consist of 7–15 somewhat leathery leaflets; these range from alternate to nearly opposite and are elliptical, ovate or rarely obovate. They measure 6–10 cm long and 2.5–4 cm wide and have a short caudate tip. The base is round or broadly wedge-shaped, symmetrical or, near the top of the leaf axis, with one side slightly shorter and slightly slanted. Mature leaves have a small number of oil glands visible under a magnifying lens; the oil glands of growing leaves are not obvious. The midrib is recessed at least below the middle section of the leaf surface and is rift-shaped; the lateral veins and branch veins are slightly convex on both sides of the leaf. The leaflet petiole is 2–4 mm long.

Inflorescences are terminal or axillary cymes near the top, 26 cm long, with many flowers, each consisting of 4 sepals and petals. The sepals are purple-green, broadly ovate and about 1 mm long; the petals are oblong and 3–4 mm long. There are 4 stamens, with filaments longer than the sepals and 1 oil gland on the top of the anther septum. The infructescence is 12 cm wide, semicircular umbrella-shaped; the lamina is about 6 mm in diameter and dark brown to black after drying; the oil gland is not obvious, and the top has a short awn tip. The seed diameter is 5–5.5 mm.

The plant flowers in May, fruiting in November. It can be found in hilly shrublands at an altitude of 450–600 meters or in humid secondary forests on both sides of the valley.
