= Zanthoxylum atchoum =

Conservation status
- Vulnerable (IUCN 2.3)

Scientific classification
- Kingdom: Plantae
- Clade: Tracheophytes
- Clade: Angiosperms
- Clade: Eudicots
- Clade: Rosids
- Order: Sapindales
- Family: Rutaceae
- Genus: Zanthoxylum
- Species: Z. atchoum

Binomial name
- Zanthoxylum atchoum (Aké Assi) P.G.Waterman

Synonyms
- Fagara atchoum

Species of tree

Zanthoxylum atchoum (synonym Fagara atchoum) is a forest tree in the family Rutaceae that grows in Côte d'Ivoire's Eastern Guinean forests. It is endemic to Côte d'Ivoire where it is threatened by habitat loss. Waterman assigned Z. atchoum to this combination after morphological and secondary metabolite evidence revealed that Fagara should be subsumed in Zanthoxylum.
