= Zanthoxylum leiboicum =

Scientific classification
- Kingdom: Plantae
- Clade: Tracheophytes
- Clade: Angiosperms
- Clade: Eudicots
- Clade: Rosids
- Order: Sapindales
- Family: Rutaceae
- Genus: Zanthoxylum
- Species: Z. leiboicum

Binomial name
- Zanthoxylum leiboicum C.C.Huang

Species of plant

Zanthoxylum leiboicum is a woody plant in the Rutaceae family and is native to Sichuan (Leibo, Jinyang, Pingshan area) in China, and is known there as léi bō huā jiāo (雷波花椒).

== Description ==
The plant is 2 meters high; branchlets and leaf shafts have many strong and straight sharp spines, and the spines are 1/2-1/6 of the length of small leaves. The leaf shafts sometimes have narrow leafy edges, and the ventral surface has a concave longitudinal groove, which is rare and nearly cylindrical; the leaf has 17–31 leaflets; the leaflets are unevenly opposed or alternate, thick paper, broadly oval or obovate, The top is round, blunt or sharply pointed, or is obovate triangle, the top is truncated, 2–4 cm long, 1.5–2.5 cm wide, there are finely cracked teeth in the upper half of the leaf margin, oil spots are not obvious or on the leaf A small number of them can be seen on the back, only visible under an enlarged lens. The midvein is slightly recessed or the upper half is flat. There are powdery puberulent hairs on the lower part of the midvein and the petiole. The lateral veins are slender and closely connected to each other; the petiole length is 1–3 Mm. Cym is nearly racemose, axillary, 4–10 cm long; fruit stalk is 1–3 mm long; after the split petals are dry, dark brown, with fine wrinkles, with inconspicuous oil spots, and no more than 0.5 at the top. Millimeter awn tip, 5.5–6 mm in diameter; seed diameter is about 5 mm. Flowering period is unknown, fruiting period is July. It is found on mountain slopes at an altitude of 410–1 500 meters or on drier slopes along both banks of river valleys. It is often mixed with trees and shrubs such as Rhus succedanea L. and Vitex negundo L.
