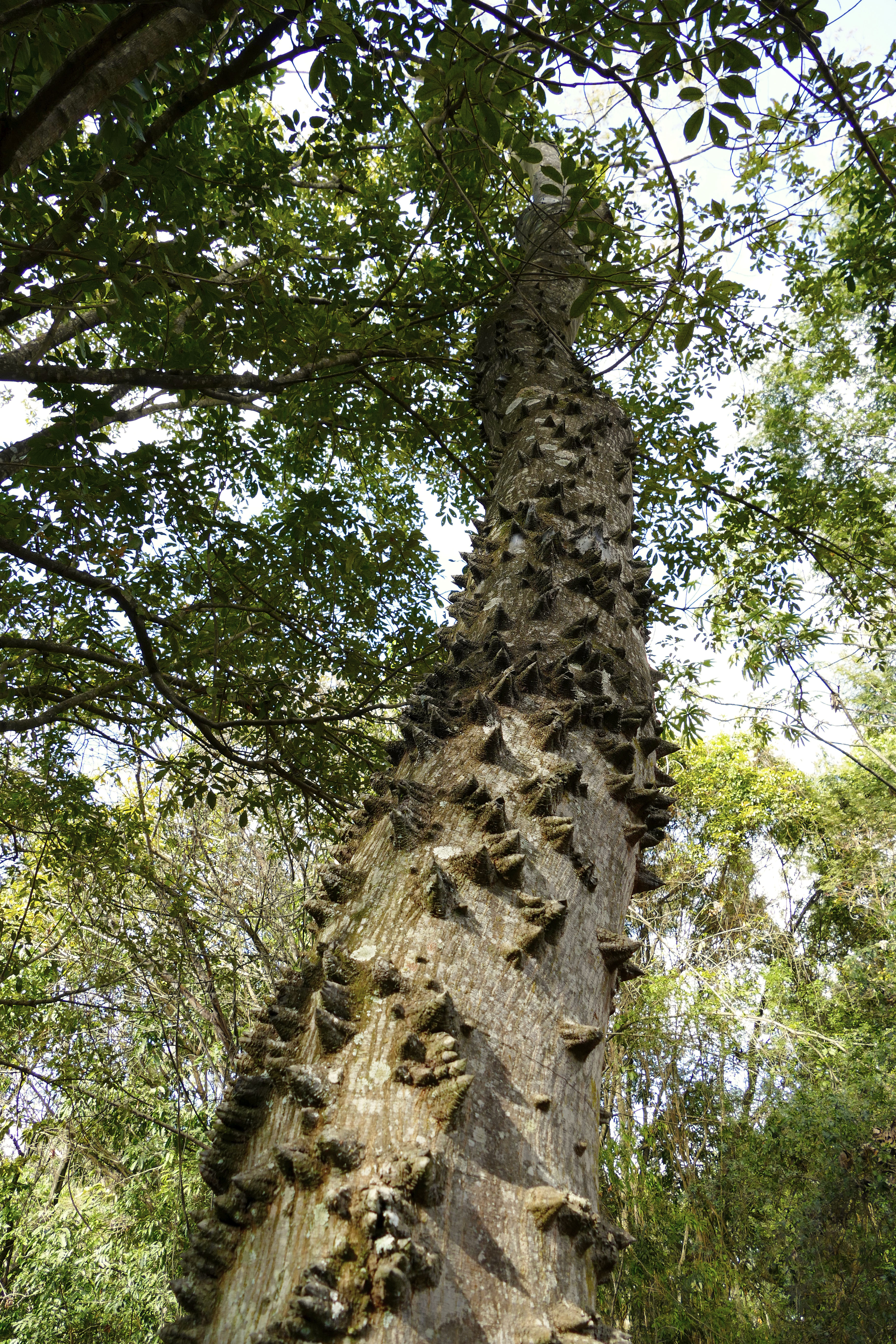

Conservation status
- Least Concern (IUCN 3.1)

Scientific classification
- Kingdom: Plantae
- Clade: Tracheophytes
- Clade: Angiosperms
- Clade: Eudicots
- Clade: Rosids
- Order: Sapindales
- Family: Rutaceae
- Genus: Zanthoxylum
- Species: Z. riedelianum

Binomial name
- Zanthoxylum riedelianum Engl.

Synonyms
- Fagara riedeliana (Engl.) Engl.

= Zanthoxylum riedelianum =

Species of plant

Zanthoxylum riedelianum is a species of the plant in the genus Zanthoxylum in the family Rutaceae. The native range of this species is Mexico to South America.

== Benefits ==
Zanthoxylum has been used worldwide to treat different conditions such as snakebites, stomach problems, skin lesions, inflammation, and parasitic diseases.
