= Zanthoxylum lindense =

Conservation status
- Vulnerable (IUCN 2.3)

Scientific classification
- Kingdom: Plantae
- Clade: Tracheophytes
- Clade: Angiosperms
- Clade: Eudicots
- Clade: Rosids
- Order: Sapindales
- Family: Rutaceae
- Genus: Zanthoxylum
- Species: Z. lindense

Binomial name
- Zanthoxylum lindense (Engl.) Kokwaro

Synonyms
- Fagara lindensis Engl.

Species of flowering plant

Zanthoxylum lindense is a species of plant in the family Rutaceae. It is endemic to Tanzania.
