= Zanthoxylum panamense =

Conservation status
- Endangered (IUCN 2.3)

Scientific classification
- Kingdom: Plantae
- Clade: Tracheophytes
- Clade: Angiosperms
- Clade: Eudicots
- Clade: Rosids
- Order: Sapindales
- Family: Rutaceae
- Genus: Zanthoxylum
- Species: Z. panamense

Binomial name
- Zanthoxylum panamense P.Wilson

Species of flowering plant

Zanthoxylum panamense is a species of plant in the family Rutaceae. It is found in Costa Rica, Honduras, and Panama.
