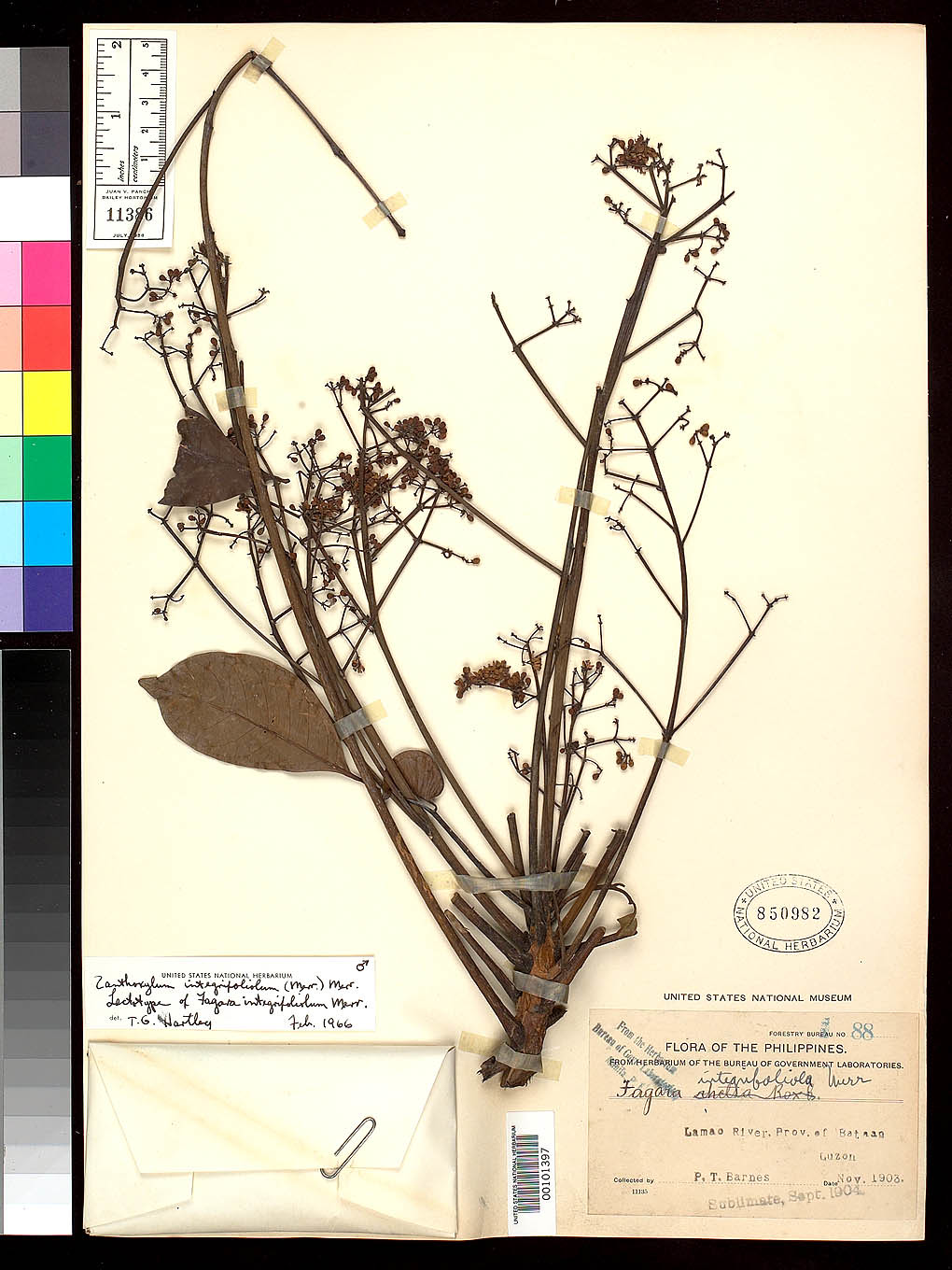

Conservation status
- Data Deficient (IUCN 2.3)

Scientific classification
- Kingdom: Plantae
- Clade: Tracheophytes
- Clade: Angiosperms
- Clade: Eudicots
- Clade: Rosids
- Order: Sapindales
- Family: Rutaceae
- Genus: Zanthoxylum
- Species: Z. integrifoliolum

Binomial name
- Zanthoxylum integrifoliolum (Merr.) Merr.

= Zanthoxylum integrifoliolum =

Species of flowering plant

Zanthoxylum integrifoliolum is a species of plant in the family Rutaceae. It is found in the Philippines and Taiwan.
