= Zanthoxylum calcicola =

Scientific classification
- Kingdom: Plantae
- Clade: Embryophytes
- Clade: Tracheophytes
- Clade: Spermatophytes
- Clade: Angiosperms
- Clade: Eudicots
- Clade: Rosids
- Order: Sapindales
- Family: Rutaceae
- Genus: Zanthoxylum
- Species: Z. calcicola

Binomial name
- Zanthoxylum calcicola Huang

Species of flowering plant

Zanthoxylum calcicola is a woody plant in the Rutaceae family. It is native to Yunnan, Guizhou, and Guangxi in China.

== Characteristics ==
Upright or clinging shrubs 2–3 meters high; annual branches are puberulent and have gray-white flaky waxy scales, tender branches and leaf shafts have a few short barbs. The leaves have 9–31 leaflets. The ventral surface of the leaf shaft, the petiole and the midvein of the leaflet are densely puberulent or pubescent at least in the lower half; the leaflets are lanceolate or obliquely oblong, sparsely ovoid, 2–5 cm long, 0.7–2.5 cm wide, 1–2 slices sparsely located at the top are slightly longer, there are a few lobed teeth near the top of the leaf margin, a shallow recess at the top, an oil point on the notch, and the base is nearly round or wide wedge-shaped, Often one side is slightly slanted, oil spots are not obvious or very few, only visible in the light perspective, the midrib is flat or slightly sunken in the lower half of the leaf surface, 9–12 side veins on each side; petiole length 1–3 Mm. The inflorescence is axillary, with 4 sepals and petals. The infructescence is conical, 3–6 cm long, and the stalk is sparsely longer than 5 mm; the individual lobules are 5–6 mm long, with oil spots that are recessed after drying; the seed diameter is 3.5–4.5 mm. Flowering period from March to April, fruit period from September to November.

Produced in the west of Guangxi, southwest of Guizhou, and southeast of Yunnan. Seen in sparse forests in mountains 500–1200 meters above sea level

The type specimens were collected from Yanshan County, Yunnan.
