= Zanthoxylum juniperinum =

Scientific classification
- Kingdom: Plantae
- Clade: Tracheophytes
- Clade: Angiosperms
- Clade: Eudicots
- Clade: Rosids
- Order: Sapindales
- Family: Rutaceae
- Genus: Zanthoxylum
- Species: Z. juniperinum

Binomial name
- Zanthoxylum juniperinum Poepp.

Synonyms
- Zanthoxylum procerum Donn.Sm.

Species of flowering plant

Zanthoxylum juniperinum is a species of plant in the family Rutaceae. It is found in Belize, Costa Rica, Guatemala, Honduras, Mexico, Nicaragua, and Panama.
