= Zanthoxylum undulatifolium =

Scientific classification
- Kingdom: Plantae
- Clade: Tracheophytes
- Clade: Angiosperms
- Clade: Eudicots
- Clade: Rosids
- Order: Sapindales
- Family: Rutaceae
- Genus: Zanthoxylum
- Species: Z. undulatifolium

Binomial name
- Zanthoxylum undulatifolium Hemsl.

Species of plant

Zanthoxylum undulatifolium (from Latin undulati, meaning wavy and folium, meaning leaf. Chinese: 浪葉花椒, meaning "wavy-leaved prickly ash") is a woody plant from the Rutaceae family. It is native to western Hubei, eastern Sichuan, Taibai Mountain in southern Shaanxi to the Three Gorges of the Yangtze River in China.

== Description ==
Small arbor, about 3 meters high. New branches and leaf shafts have sporadic short thorns or no thorns, and brown rust-colored puberulent hairs. The leaves have 3-5 leaflets; which are ovate or ovate-lanceolate, 3–8 cm long, 1.5-3.5 cm wide, sparsely larger, short or acuminate at the top, and broadly wedge-shaped or nearly at the base. Their leaf margin is round and wavy, with blunt or round cracked teeth, 1 oil spot at the tooth gap, sporadic spots or none in the rest, visible only under a magnifying glass. The midrib is flat on the leaf surface, and the side veins are 6–10 on each side. The leaf is slender and branched near the leaf margin and extended to the crack tooth gap to join the oil spots. The back of the leaf is glabrous, while the leaf surface has loose puberulent hairs. The leaflet at the top of the leaf shaft is the largest and has a length of 6–10 mm. The small leaf stalks, the other leaf shafts on the two sides of the leaflets are sessile, the leaflets are opposite, reddish brown after drying.

The cymes are terminal corymbose with 5-8 tepals. Its fruit stalks and lobes are reddish-brown, stalks are 7–14 mm long, 3-5 stalks are clustered on the top of the same total stalk; the diameter of a single stalk is about 5 mm, the top is almost without awns, the oil spot is large, and it is concave. The seed diameter is about 4 mm.

The flowering period is from April to May, and the fruiting period from August to October.

== Habitat ==
It can be found in mountain forests or vegetation shrubs at an altitude of 1600–2300 meters.
