= Zanthoxylum kwangsiense =

Scientific classification
- Kingdom: Plantae
- Clade: Tracheophytes
- Clade: Angiosperms
- Clade: Eudicots
- Clade: Rosids
- Order: Sapindales
- Family: Rutaceae
- Genus: Zanthoxylum
- Species: Z. kwangsiense

Binomial name
- Zanthoxylum kwangsiense (Hand.-Manzz.) Chun ex C.C.Huang

Species of plant

Zanthoxylum kwangsiense is a woody plant from the Rutaceae family, it is native to northwestern Guangxi, Guizhou (Libo), and Sichuan (Wushan, Fengjie) China.

== Description ==
Climbing vine; the upper branches of the plant are thornless, and the young branches, leaf shafts and inflorescence shafts are densely pubescent. The leaves have 5–9 leaflets; the leaflets are irregularly opposite or alternate individually, lanceolate or ovate, sometimes oblanceolate, 4–10 cm long, 2–3 cm wide, short tip or long tail-like tip, The base is wide wedge-shaped, papery, the leaf margin has fine round cracked teeth or not obvious cracked teeth above the middle, and there are oil spots in the teeth, and the rest of the oil spots are not obvious. The midrib is slightly concave on the leaf surface and is puberulent. At least the lower half of the veins are pubescent, and the lateral veins of the tender leaves are also sparsely pilose. Cymes axillary and terminal. The infructescence is 2–15 cm long, and the stalk is 5–10 mm long; a single lobule is about 5 mm long, with a short awn tip at the top; the seeds are nearly spherical, with a diameter of about 4 mm. It is found in sloping bushes or under sparse forests at an altitude of 600–700 meters. Sometimes the 2 ovules in a carpel develop into seeds. The root has a soft cork layer, and the inner cortex has a sulfur-yellow powdery substance, which tastes very bitter and numb. Contains alkaloids nitidine and oxynitidine; fresh leaves contain furfuraldehyde and cuspidiol, a derivative of dihydrocinnamic acid; seeds contain 25.1% oil.
