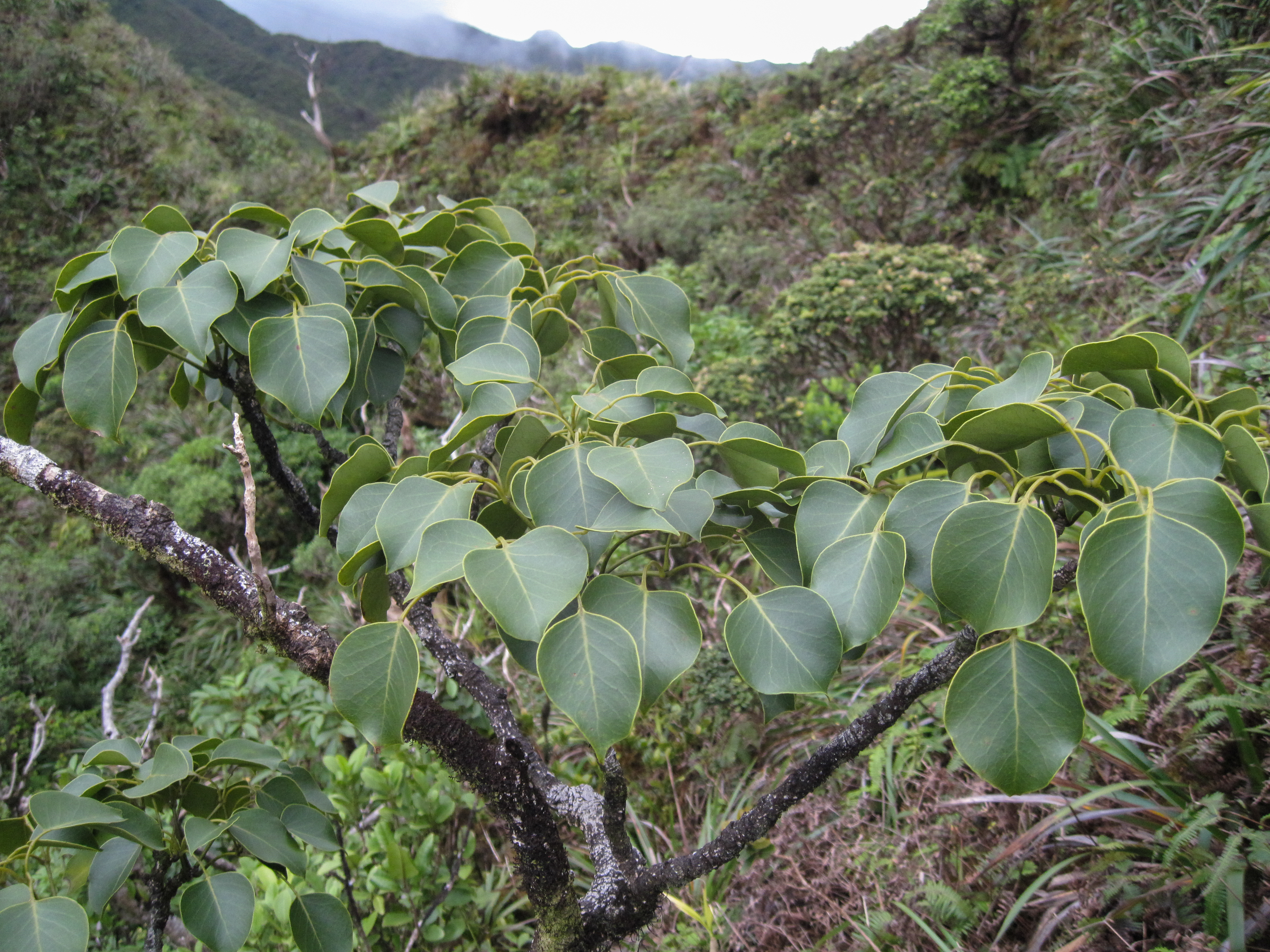

Conservation status
- Vulnerable (IUCN 2.3)

Scientific classification
- Kingdom: Plantae
- Clade: Tracheophytes
- Clade: Angiosperms
- Clade: Eudicots
- Clade: Rosids
- Order: Sapindales
- Family: Rutaceae
- Genus: Zanthoxylum
- Species: Z. oahuense

Binomial name
- Zanthoxylum oahuense Hillebr.

Synonyms
- Fagara oahuensis (Hillebr.) Engler

= Zanthoxylum oahuense =

Species of tree

Zanthoxylum oahuense, commonly known as aʻe or Oʻahu prickly-ash, is a species of flowering plant in the family Rutaceae, that is endemic to the island of Oʻahu in Hawaii. It is a small tree, reaching a height of 5 m (16 ft). Aʻe inhabits mixed mesic and wet forests at elevations of 580–800 m (1,900–2,620 ft). It is threatened by habitat loss.
