= Zanthoxylum tomentellum =

Scientific classification
- Kingdom: Plantae
- Clade: Tracheophytes
- Clade: Angiosperms
- Clade: Eudicots
- Clade: Rosids
- Order: Sapindales
- Family: Rutaceae
- Genus: Zanthoxylum
- Species: Z. tomentellum

Binomial name
- Zanthoxylum tomentellum Hook f.

Species of plant

Zanthoxylum tomentellum (Chinese: 毡毛花椒) is a tree from the family Rutaceae.

== Description ==
Zanthoxylum tomentellum is a woody climber that can be found in valleys.

== Classification ==
The species was published in Oxford's Annals of Botany in 1895. It would later be accepted in 2001's Flora of Bhutan (from the Royal Botanic Garden), 2008's Flora of China (Science Press in Beijing & Missouri Botanical Garden Press), and 2016's Check-List of Flora of Meghalaya (from the Meghalaya Biodiversity Board). It has no synonyms on record.
