= Zanthoxylum macranthum =

Scientific classification
- Kingdom: Plantae
- Clade: Tracheophytes
- Clade: Angiosperms
- Clade: Eudicots
- Clade: Rosids
- Order: Sapindales
- Family: Rutaceae
- Genus: Zanthoxylum
- Species: Z. macranthum

Binomial name
- Zanthoxylum macranthum (Hand.-Mazz.) Huang (1957)

Species of woody plant

Zanthoxylum macranthum (Chinese: 大花花椒), is a species of woody plants in the family Rutaceae. It is native to the upland open forests and thickets in south-east Tibet and southern China, and has been found in Chongqing (Nanchuan), Guizhou, south-west Henan, western Hubei, Hunan, Sichuan (Emei Shan), southern Yunnan (Xishuangbanna), and south-east Xizang.

== Characteristics ==
Climbing vine; branchlets are dark gray, with fine longitudinal wrinkles, spines are usually only found on the back of leaf shafts, or without spines. The leaf has 3-7 leaflets, nine rare, sometimes even number. The lower part of the leaf shaft is often irregularly opposite; the leaf shaft ventral surface is flat or recessed in a thin longitudinal groove; the leaflets are thick, leathery, oval, elliptical Or oblanceolate, 5–10 centimetres (2.0–3.9 in) long, 1.5–4 centimetres (0.59–1.57 in) wide, sparsely small, symmetrical on both sides, sparsely slanted on one side, with the same color on both sides, leaf margins with finely divided teeth or nearly entire, long-leaf leaves The margin is slightly curled to the back, the leaf surface has a waxy luster after drying, dim and dull, scattered and dried, slightly raised, visible oil spots, the midrib is slightly concave and has short hairs, which can only be seen under an enlarged lens. Cymes are axillary; female flowers have few pedicels or stalks about 1 millimetre (0.039 in) long; male pedicels are longer; sepals and petals are four pieces; sepals are purple-green; petals are broad elliptic, light yellow-green, about 3 millimetres (0.12 in) long; filaments of male flowers It is about 4 millimetres (0.16 in) long, short rod-shaped staminodes, and bifurcated at the top; the pistil has four carpels, and the staminodes are very small. The infructescence is 3–5 centimetres (1.2–2.0 in) long, and the stalk is 2–3 millimetres (0.079–0.118 in) long; the lobular petals are reddish-brown, 5.5–6 millimetres (0.22–0.24 in) in diameter, with a short awn tip at the top, a slightly obvious oil spot, and a slight depression after drying with a slightly convex edge; The seed diameter is about 5 millimetres (0.20 in). Flowering period from April to May, fruit period from August to September.
