= Zanthoxylum chalybeum =

Scientific classification
- Kingdom: Plantae
- Clade: Tracheophytes
- Clade: Angiosperms
- Clade: Eudicots
- Clade: Rosids
- Order: Sapindales
- Family: Rutaceae
- Genus: Zanthoxylum
- Species: Z. chalybeum

Binomial name
- Zanthoxylum chalybeum Engl.

Species of plant

Zanthoxylum chalybeum is an aromatic deciduous shrub or tree within the family Rutaceae. It is also known as the lemon scented knobwood.

== Description ==
A shrub or tree that can grow up to 12 m in height with a large crown; the trunk is furrowed, has woody knobs and often with recurved prickles, while the bark is pale grey in color. Leaves arepinnately compound with 3-5 pairs of leaflets, glabrous or pubescent, they can reach up to 7 cm long and 3 cm wide, and are elliptic to lanceolate in outline. Inflorescence, ancillary racemes or branched panicles, flowers are yellow-green in color. Fuit is ellipsoid in shape with black seeds.

== Distribution ==
Commonly found in East Africa from Ethiopia southwards to Mozambique.

== Uses ==
In parts of Kenya, Uganda and Somalia, a leaf decoction is used for the treatment of diarrhea, throat, stomach and chest pain. The leaves are also cooked and eaten as a vegetable or brewed and drunk as tea. Stem bark and root extracts are used in decoctions to treat malaria.
