= Zanthoxylum mezoneurispinosum =

Conservation status
- Vulnerable (IUCN 3.1)

Scientific classification
- Kingdom: Plantae
- Clade: Tracheophytes
- Clade: Angiosperms
- Clade: Eudicots
- Clade: Rosids
- Order: Sapindales
- Family: Rutaceae
- Genus: Zanthoxylum
- Species: Z. mezoneurispinosum

Binomial name
- Zanthoxylum mezoneurispinosum (Aké Assi) W.D.Hawth.

Synonyms
- Fagara mezoneurispinosa Aké Assi; Zanthoxylum crenatum A.Chev.

Species of flowering plant

Zanthoxylum mezoneurispinosum, synonym Fagara mezoneurispinosa, is a species of plant in the family Rutaceae. It is endemic to lowland tropical rainforests of Ivory Coast.
