= Zanthoxylum dimorphophyllum =

Conservation status
- Least Concern (IUCN 3.1)

Scientific classification
- Kingdom: Plantae
- Clade: Embryophytes
- Clade: Tracheophytes
- Clade: Spermatophytes
- Clade: Angiosperms
- Clade: Eudicots
- Clade: Rosids
- Order: Sapindales
- Family: Rutaceae
- Genus: Zanthoxylum
- Species: Z. dimorphophyllum

Binomial name
- Zanthoxylum dimorphophyllum Hemsl

Species of plant

Zanthoxylum dimorphophyllum (Chinese: 异叶花椒) is a tree from the family Rutaceae.

== Description ==
Zanthoxylum dimorphophyllum is a deciduous tree that is typically 10 metres (33 ft) tall. It is primarily found in moist areas within thickets, upland forests, and hillside open forests, including, but not limited to, in the countries of Thailand, China, and Vietnam. Its branches are unarmed or with minimal prickles, and are grayish black in color at maturity, with rust-colored young branchlets and shoots. Its fruit follicles are purplish red, 6-8 millimeters in diameter and sparsely pubescent when young, with sparse oil glands, stipitate, and shortly beaked apex. The leaves contain have been recorded as having 28 mg/g of leaf nitrogen per dry mass. Male flowers have 4-6 stamens while female flowers have 4-5 staminodes.

== Classification ==
The species was recorded as a species in Oxford's Annals of Botany in 1895. It would later be accepted as a species in 2003's Danh lục các loài thực vật Việt Nam and 2008's Flora of China.

There are three published varieties, including Zanthoxylum dimorphophyllum var. dimorphophyllum which has been found with a margin of leaflet blades with spines, Zanthoxylum dimorphophyllum var. multifoliolatum (C. C. Huang) which has been found with 3 to 5 leaflets, and Zanthoxylum dimorphophyllum var. spinifolium (Rehder & E. H. Wilson) which has been found with 7 to 11 leaflets. In 1997, C. C. Huang mistakenly classified Zanthoxylum dimorphophyllum as a synonym for Z. ovalifolium Wight, which is found from India to Northeast Australia, not in the same East and Southeast Asian forests that Zanthoxylum dimorphophyllum appears. This classification is still found in some records. Fagara dimorphophylla has previously been recorded as a possible synonym, which itself was identified in 1896 though later published as "not accepted" in 2001 World Checklist of Seed Plants Database.

A 2001 study on the compounds of Zanthoxylum dimorphophyllum var spinifolium, isolated five compounds including the new 6-(2',3'-dihydroxy-3'-methybutyl)-7-acetoxy-2H-1-benzopyran-2-one. A 2020 study hoping to identify compounds for the purpose of pest control isolated two new coumarins from Zanthoxylum dimorphophyllum var spinifolium.
