= Zanthoxylum delagoense =

Conservation status
- Least Concern (IUCN 3.1)

Scientific classification
- Kingdom: Plantae
- Clade: Tracheophytes
- Clade: Angiosperms
- Clade: Eudicots
- Clade: Rosids
- Order: Sapindales
- Family: Rutaceae
- Genus: Zanthoxylum
- Species: Z. delagoense

Binomial name
- Zanthoxylum delagoense Waterman

Species of flowering plant

Zanthoxylum delagoense is a species of plant in the family Rutaceae. It is endemic to Mozambique.
