= Zanthoxylum pteracanthum =

Scientific classification
- Kingdom: Plantae
- Clade: Tracheophytes
- Clade: Angiosperms
- Clade: Eudicots
- Clade: Rosids
- Order: Sapindales
- Family: Rutaceae
- Genus: Zanthoxylum
- Species: Z. pteracanthum

Binomial name
- Zanthoxylum pteracanthum Rehder & E.H. Wilson

Species of plant

Zanthoxylum pteracanthum (Chinese: 翼刺花椒)is a plant from the Rutaceae family.

== Description ==
These trees have been found to be around from 2 to 3 meters tall. They have been records in upland thickets of Western Hubei.

== Classification ==
The species was published in 1914's Plantae Wilsonianae an enumeration of the woody plants collected in Western China for the Arnold Arboretum of Harvard University during the years 1907, 1908 and 1910.

It would later be accepted 2008's Flora of China.
