= Zanthoxylum xichouense =

Scientific classification
- Kingdom: Plantae
- Clade: Tracheophytes
- Clade: Angiosperms
- Clade: Eudicots
- Clade: Rosids
- Order: Sapindales
- Family: Rutaceae
- Genus: Zanthoxylum
- Species: Z. xichouense

Binomial name
- Zanthoxylum xichouense C.C. Huang

Species of plant

Zanthoxylum xichouense (Chinese: 西畴花椒)is a woody climber from the Rutaceae family.

== Description ==
Zanthoxylum xichouense are woody climbers that have been found in Southeast Yunnan.

== Classification ==
The species was published in Acta Phytotax in 1975. It would later be accepted in 2008's Flora of China.
