= Zanthoxylum myriacanthum =

Conservation status
- Least Concern (IUCN 3.1)

Scientific classification
- Kingdom: Plantae
- Clade: Tracheophytes
- Clade: Angiosperms
- Clade: Eudicots
- Clade: Rosids
- Order: Sapindales
- Family: Rutaceae
- Genus: Zanthoxylum
- Species: Z. myriacanthum

Binomial name
- Zanthoxylum myriacanthum Rehd.

Species of plant

Zanthoxylum myriacanthum (Chinese: 大叶臭花椒) is a woody plant from the family Rutaceae.

== Description ==
Zanthoxylum dmyriacanthum is a deciduous tree that is typically 15 metres (49 ft) tall. It has been found in the hillside forests of China, Indonesia, Malaysia, Myanmar, Philippines, and Vietnam.

== Classification ==
It was published in 1875 in The Flora of British India. It was accept in 1995's A catalogue of the Vascular Plants of Malaya Gardens Bulletin Singapore, 2001's Flora of Bhutan, 2003's Danh lục các loài thực vật Việt Nam, and 2014's Plant diversity of Assam.
