= Zanthoxylum laetum =

Scientific classification
- Kingdom: Plantae
- Clade: Tracheophytes
- Clade: Angiosperms
- Clade: Eudicots
- Clade: Rosids
- Order: Sapindales
- Family: Rutaceae
- Genus: Zanthoxylum
- Species: Z. laetum

Binomial name
- Zanthoxylum laetum Drake

Species of plant

Zanthoxylum laetum is a species of woody plant from the Rutaceae family.

== Description ==
Z. laetum is a vine that grows up to 4 meters tall. Its stems and branches have barbs. Leaf shafts feature many spines. The plant has short puberulent hairs on the leaf shafts, petioles, and midribs, and the leaflets have scattered transparent oil spots.

The leaves have 5-13 leaflets which alternate. They are whole, ovate or ovate-elliptic, sparsely oblong, 8–15 cm long, 4–7 cm wide. The apex caudate is long or short, pointed, blunt head, slightly concave, symmetrical on both sides. The thinner side is slightly slanted. The leaf surface is bright after drying. The oil spots are not obvious. The midrib is flat or slightly recessed on the leaf surface. The side veins are 9–14 on each side, and the reticulated leaf veins are more obvious. The petiole is 2–6 mm long.

Inflorescences are axillary. The pedicels are approximately as long as petals. The sepals and petals are in 4 pieces. The sepals are light purple-green, narrow ovate, less than 1 mm in length. The petals are yellow-green, broad ovate, about 4 mm in length. The male flowers are threadlike, yellowish green, 6–8 mm long. The staminodes are terete, 4-parted; staminodes short linear in female flowers.

The fruit stems are 2–5 mm long. The fruits are separated from each other. They are reddish-brown and the edges are often purple-red, a single diameter of 7–9 mm, with a beak tip no more than 1 mm long at the top. The oil spots are recessed after drying, and they are visibly smooth with slight raised edges.

The seeds are nearly spherical, 6–7 mm in diameter, brownish-black, and shiny. The flowering period is from March to May, while the fruit period is from September to December.

== Habitat ==
It is native to North Vietnam and Guangdong (Zhanjiang region), Hainan, southwestern Guangxi, and southern Yunnan in China.It is found at 500–1200 meters in mountain mixed woods. It grows in limestone mountains and soil mountains. It is common in humid dense forests and climbs on other trees.

== Applications ==
In Hainan, its roots and stem bark are used as fish poisoning agents. It is used as herbal medicine in folk. It is used to treat pains such as toothache.
