= Zanthoxylum ekmanii =

Scientific classification
- Kingdom: Plantae
- Clade: Tracheophytes
- Clade: Angiosperms
- Clade: Eudicots
- Clade: Rosids
- Order: Sapindales
- Family: Rutaceae
- Genus: Zanthoxylum
- Species: Z. ekmanii

Binomial name
- Zanthoxylum ekmanii (Urb.) Alain

Synonyms
- Fagara ekmanii Urb.; Zanthoxylum belizense Lundell; Zanthoxylum sobrevielae D.R.Simpson

Species of flowering plant

Zanthoxylum ekmanii is a species of plant in the family Rutaceae. It is found in Belize, Costa Rica, Guatemala, Honduras, Mexico, Nicaragua, and Panama.
