= Zanthoxylum multijugum =

Scientific classification
- Kingdom: Plantae
- Clade: Tracheophytes
- Clade: Angiosperms
- Clade: Eudicots
- Clade: Rosids
- Order: Sapindales
- Family: Rutaceae
- Genus: Zanthoxylum
- Species: Z. multijugum

Binomial name
- Zanthoxylum multijugum Franch.

Species of plant

Zanthoxylum multijugum (Chinese: 多叶花椒) is a woody climber from the family Rutaceae.

== Description ==
As a species of woody climbers, Zanthoxylum multijugum has been found in "open forests" and "hillside thickets". It has a native range that includes North and Central Yunnan as well as Guizhou within China. It has been found from 1,500 metres (4,921 feet) to 2,200 metres (7,218 feet) meters above sea level.

Its leaves have been observed with 19-51 leaflets and minimal or no stalks. The leaves vary in shape (lanceolate, elliptic, or ovate), tend to be asymmetrical, have spots, and have been seen with blunt, rounded, or mucronate apexes. Its young branchlets have been found to be pale reddish brown in color. Prickles have been found on stems, branches, and leaf rachises. Flower petals have been found to be a pale yellowish green color, are oblong in shape and are about 2 millimetres (0.079 inches) in size. Their flowering period is from May to June, while their fruiting period lasts from October to November. Male flowers have four stamens and broadly ovate anthers while female flowers have pedicels that are two to five millimeters in size with fruits about one centimeter in size. Fruit follicles have been observed as brownish red in color, about five millimeters in diameter, and with their apex beaked. Their seeds have been found to be from 4 to 4.5 millimeters in diameter.

== Classification ==
In 1889, it was published as a species in Plantae Delavayanae as part of a specimen collection by Père Jean Marie Delavay and taxonomy work of Adrien René Franchet. It was accepted as a plant species in 2008's Flora of China where it was identified to appear in Yunnan and Guizhou. There have been three identified synonyms of the species, including Fagara mengtzeana, Fagara multijuga, and Zanthoxylum multifoliolatum. There are no common names associated with this species.

Seven specimens of the species are kept at the Royal Botanic Gardens, Kew, includes multiple pieces provided by Augustine Henry.

Multijigum derives from multijugus which means "many joined together".
