= Zanthoxylum stenophyllum =

Conservation status
- Least Concern (IUCN 3.1)

Scientific classification
- Kingdom: Plantae
- Clade: Tracheophytes
- Clade: Angiosperms
- Clade: Eudicots
- Clade: Rosids
- Order: Sapindales
- Family: Rutaceae
- Genus: Zanthoxylum
- Species: Z. stenophyllum

Binomial name
- Zanthoxylum stenophyllum Hemsl

Species of plant

Zanthoxylum dimorphophyllum (Chinese: 异叶花椒)is a tree from the Rutaceae family.

== Description ==
Zanthoxylum dimorphophyllum are deciduous trees that are typically 1–3 meters tall.

== Classification ==
The species was recorded in Oxford's Annals of Botany in 1895. It would later be accepted in 2008's Flora of China.
