= Zanthoxylum glomeratum =

Scientific classification
- Kingdom: Plantae
- Clade: Tracheophytes
- Clade: Angiosperms
- Clade: Eudicots
- Clade: Rosids
- Order: Sapindales
- Family: Rutaceae
- Genus: Zanthoxylum
- Species: Z. glomeratum

Binomial name
- Zanthoxylum glomeratum C.C.Huang

Species of plant

Zanthoxylum glomeratum is a woody plant in the Rutaceae family. It is native to Southeast and South-Central China.

== Description ==
Scattered shrubs; branches and leaves are glabrous, with a few short spines or no spines. Leaves have 5-9 leaflets; leaflets alternate, thick paper, entire, lanceolate or oblong, sparsely ovoid, apex is long acuminate or caudate, apex is round or slightly concave, 6–12 cm long, 2.5–5 cm wide, with many oil spots, yellow or light brown after drying, obvious depression on the leaf surface, visible under an enlarged microscope, leaf veins reticulate, embossed on the leaf surface, hidden on the back of the leaf; petiole length 4 –8 mm, the leaf shaft is flat on the ventral surface or has a narrow leaf qualitative edge. The cymes are axillary, the female inflorescence is 2–6 cm long; the pedicel is 1–2 mm long and pilose; the sepals and petals are 4 pieces; the petals are oval-shaped, yellowish green, and about 3 mm long. Infructescence is spherical or conical, fruit stalk is 5–8 mm long; individual lobules are about 7 mm long, without awn tip, light yellow or brownish yellow after drying, oil spots are often slightly sunken; seed diameter is about 6 mm, Dark brown, bright. Flowering in April, fruiting in September. It is found in mountain bushes or under forests at an altitude of about 1,500 meters.
