= Zanthoxylum esquirolii =

Scientific classification
- Kingdom: Plantae
- Clade: Tracheophytes
- Clade: Angiosperms
- Clade: Eudicots
- Clade: Rosids
- Order: Sapindales
- Family: Rutaceae
- Genus: Zanthoxylum
- Species: Z. esquirolii

Binomial name
- Zanthoxylum esquirolii Levl.

Species of plant

Zanthoxylum esquirolii is a woody plant in the family Rutaceae from Guizhou, Sichuan, and Yunnan China.

== Description ==
Small trees or shrubs; twigs drooping, light reddish purple and slightly covered with white powder frost after drying, small barbed thorns on the branches and leaf shafts, and all parts are glabrous. Leaves have 5-13 leaflets; leaflets alternate, ovate or lanceolate, sparsely ovate, 3–10 cm long, 1.5-4.5 cm wide, with a long pointed tail with often curved top, concave head, near base Round or wide wedge-shaped, oil spots are not obvious or only a few can be seen under the enlarged lens, the leaf margin has small cracked teeth or the lower half is entire, the midrib is sunken on the leaf surface, and is glabrous; the petiole is 3–6 mm long. Corymb-like cymes are terminal, with less than 30 flowers, sparse and more; pedicels are obviously elongated after anthesis, fruit stalks are 4.5 cm long and 0.5–1 mm thick as a result; sepals and petals are 4 pieces; petals Approximately 3 mm long; female flowers have 4 (3) carpels. The fruit petals are purplish red, with a diameter of about 5 mm, and the tip of the awn is 1–2 mm long, and the oil spots are often sunken; the seed diameter is about 4 mm. Flowering from May to June, fruiting from September to November. It is found in sparse forests or bushes in mountains at an altitude of 900–2000 meters. This species is very close to Zanthoxylum bungeanum, except that the leaf shafts and pedicels are all hairless; the fruit stalks are far slender and the petals are smaller; the upper branchlets often have off-white powder frost, which can be distinguished. The fruit stems from the central part of Yunnan are short, about 1 cm long, but 1.5 mm thick; the small leaves are thick and hard, and the oil spots are not obvious. These characteristics are similar to those of Zanthoxylum bungeanum, but all parts of this species are glabrous, and the upper part of the shoots has a grayish white powder frost, which is its characteristic.
