= Zanthoxylum liboense =

Scientific classification
- Kingdom: Plantae
- Clade: Tracheophytes
- Clade: Angiosperms
- Clade: Eudicots
- Clade: Rosids
- Order: Sapindales
- Family: Rutaceae
- Genus: Zanthoxylum
- Species: Z. liboense

Binomial name
- Zanthoxylum liboense Huang

Species of plant

Zanthoxylum liboense (Chinese: 荔波花椒 (Pinyin: lì bō huā jiāo) is a plant in the Rutaceae family.

== Description ==
Z. liboense is a shrub or climbing vine that reaches 1.5 meters high. The branchlets and leaf shafts have many hooks and short spines. Its biennial branches are brown-black with fine longitudinal wrinkles and short hairs. The leaf shafts are round and pubescent with the inflorescence shaft and petiole. The leaves have 5-9 leaflets. The leaflets are nearly opposite or alternate, thin leathery, entire, ovoid or elliptical, 6–8 cm long, 2.5-3.5 cm wide, round base, acuminate or short apex at the top, symmetrical on both sides, the back of the leaf is short-haired. The midrib is flat on the leaf surface, while the upper half is slightly concave, puberulent. Leaflets have 10 lateral veins on each side -13; small petioles are 2–5 mm long.

The flowers have not been seen. Infructescence axillary, 3–4 cm long, the fruit sequence axis is slender than the petiole; the fruit stalk is 6–10 mm long; each fruit is composed of 4 lobules, densely pubescent when young, and sparsely hairs when mature. The diameter of a single branch is 7–8 mm, and the oil spot is not obvious. The awn tip on the top side is 1-1.5 mm long, and it is dark brown and black when dried; the seed diameter is 5–6 mm. Fruiting period from August to September.

== Habitat ==
It is native to Libo, Guizhou, China. It is found in the shaded forests or bushes of valleys at an altitude of about 730 meters.
