= Zanthoxylum echinocarpum =

Scientific classification
- Kingdom: Plantae
- Clade: Tracheophytes
- Clade: Angiosperms
- Clade: Eudicots
- Clade: Rosids
- Order: Sapindales
- Family: Rutaceae
- Genus: Zanthoxylum
- Species: Z. echinocarpum

Binomial name
- Zanthoxylum echinocarpum Hemsl.

Species of plant

Zanthoxylum echinocarpum is a woody plant in the family Rutaceae and is native to South-Central and Southeast China.

== Characteristics ==
Climbing vine: the pith of the tender branches is large, the branches and leaves have thorns, and there are many thorns on the leaf axis. The thorns on the inflorescence axis are uneven but straight. The tender branches, leaf axis, petiole and leaf midrib are all densely pubescent. There are 5-11 leaflets, including 3 sparse ones; leaflets are thick papery, alternate, or some are opposite, ovate, ovate-elliptic or oblong, 7–13 cm long, 2.5–5 cm wide. The base is rounded, sometimes slightly heart-shaped, whole or nearly whole, with fine brown and black oil spots near the leaf margin, which can be seen under an enlarged microscope, and sometimes pubescent on the back of the leaf along the midrib; the petiole is long 2–5 mm long.

Inflorescences are axillary, sometimes with terminal; 4 sepals and petals, lavender-green sepals; petals 2–3 mm long; 4 stamens in male flowers; 4 carpels in female flowers, occasionally 3 or 5, growing shortly after anthesis. Short awn-like thorns; fruit stalks are 1–3 mm long, usually without fruit stalks; the stalks are densely grown and have short and branched thorns, the thorns can grow up to 1 cm; the seed diameter is 6–8 mm. Flowering occurs in April and May, the fruit period is from October to December.

== Lower taxa ==
Zanthoxylum echinocarpum var. echinocarpum

The fruit petals and leaflets are glabrous, or only the back of the leaf is pubescent along the midrib. It is grown in Hubei, Hunan, Guangdong, Guangxi, Guizhou, Sichuan and Yunnan. It is found in the forest at an altitude of 200–1000 meters. People from Hubei use its root as herbal medicine to treat rheumatism and joint pain

Zanthoxylum echinocarpum var. echinocarpum var. tomentosum

Leaflet midrib, leaf back, leaf shaft, petiole, branchlet, inflorescence shaft, etc. are densely covered with long hairs, and mature saplings are also covered with hairs. The flower and fruit period is the same as that of Zanthoxylum bungeanum. It is grown in Tian'e in Guangxi, Guizhou (Anlong), Yunnan (Wenshan, Mengzi, etc.). It is found in sloping forests or bushes about 600 meters above sea level, and is common in limestone mountains.
