= Zanthoxylum dissitum =

Scientific classification
- Kingdom: Plantae
- Clade: Tracheophytes
- Clade: Angiosperms
- Clade: Eudicots
- Clade: Rosids
- Order: Sapindales
- Family: Rutaceae
- Genus: Zanthoxylum
- Species: Z. dissitum

Binomial name
- Zanthoxylum dissitum Hemsl.

Synonyms
- Fagara dissita (Hemsl.) Engl.; Zanthoxylum bodinieri H. Lév.

Species of plant

Zanthoxylum dissitum is a woody plant native to China. It grows in upland thickets and open forests, forests, at 300–2600 m altitude.

== Description ==
The plant is a woody Climbing vine; and its stems turn gray-white when old. The brownish red thorns on the branches are strong and straight, or hooked downward on the leaf shafts and midribs. The leaf has usually 5-9 leaflets, or seldom three; leaflets are alternate or nearly opposite, with various shapes, up to 20 cm in length, 1–8 cm in width or wider, with cracked teeth on the whole or on the edge of the leaf (Zanthoxylum bungeanum). The leaves are symmetrical on both sides, the thin side is slightly slanted, the top is tapered to a long tail, thick paper or nearly leathery, hairless, the midrib is sunken on the leaf surface, the oil spot is very small, and it is not easy to see under the enlarged lens; The petiole is 3–10 mm long. The inflorescences are axillary, usually no more than 10 cm long, with short hairs on the rachis; 4 sepals and petals, with no oil spots; purple-green sepals, broad ovate, less than 1 mm long; petals light yellow-green, broad ovate, The length of the male flower is 4–5 mm; the pedicel of the male flower is 1–3 mm long; the stamens are 4, and the filaments are 5–6 mm long; the top of the staminodes is 4 lobed; the female flowers have no staminodes. The fruit is densely packed in the infructescence, with short fruit stalks; the fruit is brown, the exocarp is wider than the endocarp, the exocarp is smooth, and the edge is thinner. After drying, it shows an arc-shaped ring, 10–15 mm long, and the remaining style is on one side, long No more than 1/3 mm; seed diameter 8–10 mm. The fruit petals are large, the inner and outer pericarps are not the same size; the fruit on the infructescence is densely clustered; the tender branches have a large, nearly spongy pith; the leaflets of the leaflets are brownish-red.

== Varieties ==
=== Zanthoxylum dissitum (wild type) var. dissitum ===
The branchlets have no dense needle-like straight spines; the leaflets are broad or narrow and oval, or lanceolate, sometimes nearly round, not more than 6 times their width, and the edges are entire. Flowering period from April to May, fruit period from September to October. Grows in the southern part of Shaanxi and Gansu provinces, the eastern boundary ends at the Three Gorges area of the Yangtze River, and the southern boundary ends at the northern slope of Wuling. It is found in forests or bushes on slopes of 300–1500 meters above sea level, and it grows on limestone mountains and soil mountains. In western Sichuan, it is found in broad-leaved mixed forests dominated by thorny bamboo, ke tree, and silk chestnut. In Guangxi and Guizhou, it is mostly born in limestone mountains. From the specimens were collected from Yichang, Hubei: The roots and stems are used as herbs. It has a pungent, bitter taste, and is slightly poisonous. In other words, it is sweet, spicy and non-toxic. Dispelling gasses and relieving pain, regulating qi and dissipating phlegm, promoting blood circulation and removing blood stasis. It can cure many types of pain and sprains. A section of branchlets is densely grown with short, straight thorns that are densely grater-shaped, and the inflorescence axis is also scattered with slender and straight thorns. Flowering period from April to May, fruiting period from September to November

=== Zanthoxylum dissitum (variety) var. lanciforme ===
The leaflets are long and narrow, band-lanceolate, 10–20 cm long and 1–2 cm wide, with pointed ends, shallow wavy leaf margins, and distant lateral veins. Flowering from November to December. It grows in Damiaoshan, Guangxi and is found under dense forests in valleys about 1000 meters above sea level.

=== Zanthoxylum dissitum (variety) var. acutiserratum ===
The leaflets are oblong, 6–10 cm long and 2–3 cm wide. The edge of the leaf has separated serrated lobes, and the tooth tips are pointed. Flowering period from April to May, fruit period from August to September. Grows in Ganluo, Sichuan. Seen in the sparse forest in the mountains at an altitude of 2400 meters.

=== Zanthoxylum dissitum var. hispidum ===
A section of branchlets is densely grown with short, straight thorns, densely grater-shaped, and the inflorescence axis is also scattered with slender and straight thorns. Flowering period from April to May, fruit period from September to November.
