= Zanthoxylum piasezkii =

Conservation status
- Least Concern (IUCN 3.1)

Scientific classification
- Kingdom: Plantae
- Clade: Embryophytes
- Clade: Tracheophytes
- Clade: Spermatophytes
- Clade: Angiosperms
- Clade: Eudicots
- Clade: Rosids
- Order: Sapindales
- Family: Rutaceae
- Genus: Zanthoxylum
- Species: Z. piasezkii

Binomial name
- Zanthoxylum piasezkii Maxim.

Species of plant

Zanthoxylum piasezkii (Chinese: 川陕花椒 Chuān shǎn huājiāo) is a tree from the family Rutaceae.

== Description ==
Zanthoxylum piasezkii are deciduous trees that are typically 10 metres (33 ft) tall.

Shrubs or trees, 1–3 m (3 ft 3 in – 9 ft 10 in) tall, all parts glabrous. Stems and branches with brownish red prickles. Leaves 7-17-foliolate; rachis marginate; leaflet blades sessile, orbicular, broadly elliptic, or obovate-rhombic, 3-25 × 3-8 mm, thickly leathery, pale brown to blackish brown when dry, midvein impressed, secondary veins inconspicuous, base symmetric or slightly oblique, margin apically crenate. Inflorescences terminal. Perianth in 2 irregular series or 1 series, with 6-8 ± undifferentiated tepals. Tepals broadly deltoid, ca. 1.5 mm or longer. Male flowers: pedicel 5-8 mm; stamens 5 or 6; connective blackish brown when dry, with oil gland on tip; rudimentary gynoecium projecting outward and cushion-shaped. Female flowers: carpels 2 or 3(or 4); styles recurved. Fruit follicles purplish red, 4-5 mm in diameter, with a few protruding oil glands. Seeds 3-4 mm in diameter. Flowers in May, fruiting in June-July. Found at altitudes of 1,700–2,500 m (5,580–8,200 ft) in the provinces of Southern Gansu, Western Henan, Southern Shaanxi, and Sichuan.

== Classification ==
The species was published in the Russian journal Trudy Imperatorskago S.-Peterburgskago Botaničeskago Sada in 1889. It would later be accepted in 2008's Flora of China.
