= Bojer =

Bojer is a surname. Notable people with the surname include:

- Wenceslas Bojer (1795–1856), Czech naturalist and botanist
- Johan Bojer (1872–1959), Norwegian novelist and dramatist
