= List of Japanese ingredients =

The following is a list of ingredients used in Japanese cuisine. While some basic cooking ingredients such as rice and soy sauce have become widely available outside Japan, other specialty ingredients are only available in stores that import foods from Asia.

== Plant sources ==
=== Cereal grain ===
- Rice
  - Short or medium grain white rice. Regular (non-sticky) rice is called uruchi-mai.
  - Mochi rice (glutinous rice)-sticky rice, sweet rice
  - Genmai (brown rice)
  - Rice bran (nuka) – not usually eaten itself, but used for pickling, and also added to boiling water to parboil tart vegetables
  - Arare – toasted brown rice grains in genmai cha and chazuke nori
  - Kome-kōji – Aspergillus cultures
  - Sake kasu
  - sake
- Awa (mochi awa)
- Oshimugi (barley)

=== Flour ===
- Katakuri starch – an alternative ingredient for potato starch
- Kinako – soybean flour/meal
- Kibi – (millet) flour
- Konnyaku – starch powder
- Kudzu starch
- Rice flour (komeko)
  - Joshinko
  - Mochiko
  - Shiratamako
  - Dōmyōji ko – semi-cooked rice dried and coarsely pulverized; used as alternate breading in domyoji age deep-fried dish, also used in Kansai-style sakuramochi confection. Medium fine ground types are called shinbikiko (新引粉,真挽粉) and used as breaded crust or for confection. Fine ground are jōnanko (上南粉)
  - Mijinko, kanbaiko (寒梅粉) – powdery starch made from sticky rice.
  - Gyūhi flour
- Soba flour
- warabi starch – substitutes are sold under this name, though authentic starch derives from fern roots. See warabimochi
- Wheat flour
  - Tempura flour
  - Kyōriki ko, chūriki ko, hakuriki ko – descending grades of protein content; all purpose, udon flour, cake flour
  - Uki ko – name for the starch of rice or wheat. Apparently used for wagashi to some extent. In Chinese cuisine, it is used to make the translucent skin of the shrimp har gow.

=== Noodles ===
- Soba
- Sōmen
- Ramen
- Udon
- Yakisoba noodles

=== Vegetables ===
==== Botanic fruits as vegetables ====
- Cucumber (kyūri)
- Eggplant (nasu, nasubi)
- Shishitō – mild peppers
  - Manganji pepper
  - Fushimi pepper (伏見とうがらし) – The leaves of the fushimi made into tsukudani are hatōgarashi.
- kabocha – pumpkins, squash
- shiro-uri – type of squash/melon.

==== Cabbage family ====
- Komatsuna – (B. rapa var. perviridis)
- Mizuna - (B. rapa var. nipposinica)
- Napa cabbage (hakusai) – (B. rapa var. glabra)
- Takana (タカナ) – (Brassica juncea var. integrifolia or var. of mustard)
- Nozawana – (cultivar of B. rapa var. hakabura)
- Nanohana (rapeseed or coleseed flowering-stalks, used like broccoli rabe)

==== Other leafy vegetables ====
- Spinach (hōrensō)

==== Onion family ====
Vegetables in the onion family are called negi in Japanese.

- Asatsuki – type of chives
- Nira – Chinese chives or garlic chive
- Rakkyo
- Wakegi – formerly thought a variety of scallion, but geneticists discover it to be a cross with the bulb onion (A. × wakegi).
- Green onions or scallions
  - Fukaya negi (深谷ネギ) – Often used to denote the types as thick as leeks used in Kantō region, but is not a proper name of a cultivar, and merely taken from the production area of Fukaya, Saitama. In the east, the white part of the onion near the base like to be used.
  - Bannō negi ("multipurpose scallion") – young plants.
  - Kujō negi – Kyoto cultivar of green onion.
  - Shimonita negi – Cultivar named after Shimonita, Gunma.
  - Other varieties with articles are Kan'on negi (Hiroshima), Yatabe negi (Fukui), Tokuda negi (Gifu)
- Nobiru – Allium macrostemon, collected from the wild much like field garlic.
- Gyōja ninniku – Allium victorialis, much like ramps.

==== Root vegetables ====
- Chorogi – Chinese artichoke, Stachys affinis
- Daikon – Japanese radish
- Gobo – Arctium lappa
- Lotus root (renkon, hasu)
- Potato (jaga-imo)
- Sweet potato (satsuma-imo)
- Taro (satoimo) and stalk (zuiki, imogara)
  - Ebi imo – Kyoto variety
  - Zuiki – stems available fresh or dried; their tartness must be boiled off before use.
- Takenoko – bamboo shoots
  - Himetakenoko, sasa-takenoko, nemagari-take – Slender bamboo shoots of Chishima zasa bamboo (Sasa kurilensis), so-called "baby bamboo shoots".
  - Menma – vital condiment to ramen, made from the Taiwanese giant bamboo (Dendrocalamus latiflorus) and not from the typical bamboo shoot.
- Yamaimo – vague name that can denote either Dioscorea spp. (Japanese yam or Chinese yam) below. The root is often grated into a sort of starchy puree. The correct way is to grate the yam against the grains of the suribachi. Also the tubercle (mukago) used whole.
  - Yamanoimo or jinenjo (Dioscorea japonica) – considered the true Japanese yam. The name jinenjo refers to roots dug from the wild.
  - Nagaimo (D. opposita) – In a strict sense, refers to the long truncheon-like form.
  - Yamatoimo (D. opposita) – A fan-shaped (ginkgo leaf shaped) variety, more viscous than the long form.
  - Tsukuneimo (D. polystachya var.) – A round variety even more viscous and highly prized.
  - Mukago – edible tubercles
- Yurine – lily bulbs

==== Sprouts ====
- Kaiware – radish sprouts
- Moyashi – mung sprouts
- Soybean sprouts (mame-moyashi)

==== Specialty vegetables ====
- Aralia cordata – "Japanese spikenard"
- Fuki –a type of butterbur, both stalk and young flower shoots
- Kanpyō – dried gourd strips
- Konnyaku – shirataki
- Sansai – a term for wild-picked vegetables in general, including fernbrake, bamboo shoots, tree shoots

==== Pickled vegetables ====
- Tsukemono – term for Japanese pickles.
- Takuan zuke
- Suguki

=== Nuts ===
- Ginkgo nuts
- Azuki bean
- Kuri – chestnuts
- Onigurumi – Japanese walnut (Juglans ailantifolia)
- Tochi-no-mi – a type of buckeye or horse chestnut (Aesculus turbinata)
- Shii-no-mi – acorns of Castanopsis spp.

=== Seeds ===
- Sesame seeds
  - Black sesame seeds
  - White sesame seeds
- Shiso seeds
- Wild sesame seeds (egoma)
- Hemp seeds (onomi) – mixed in with shichimi
- Karashi – usually powdered mustard, or in paste tubes
- Sanshō – Zanthoxylum piperitum

=== Mushrooms ===
- Enokitake
- Eringi
- Matsutake
- Maitake
- Nameko
- Hiratake
- Shiitake
- Shimeji
- Wood ear (kikurage)
- Rhizopogon roseolus (shōro)

=== Seaweed ===
- Ego-nori – Campylaephora hypnaeoides
- Habanori – Petalonia binghamiae
- Hijiki
- Konbu – kombu, kelp
  - Tororo-kombu or oboro-kombu – thin shavings of kelp
  - Usuita-kombu – a thin sheet of kelp created as a byproduct
  - Mekabu – the thick, pleated portion near the attached base of the seaweed
- Mozuku
- Nori
  - Iwa-nori – refers to seaweed harvested from sea-rock.
- Ogonori
- Okyūto
- Suizenji-nori – Aphanothece sacrum, a Kyushu specialty
- Tengusa – also known as kanten and tokoroten; agar
- Wakame

=== Fruits ===
==== Citrus ====
- Amanatsu
- Daidai
- Dekopon – a new hybrid
- Iyokan
- Kabosu
- Sudachi
- Yuzu

==== Other ====
- Akebia (sausage fruit)
- Ume
- Loquat
- Makuwauri – a traditional type of melon
- Nashi pear
- Persimmon
- Yamamomo – Myrica rubra

=== Soy products ===
- Edamame
- Miso
- Soy sauce (light, dark, tamari)
- Nattō
- Daitokuji nattō
- Mame moyashi – soy sprouts
- Kinako – soy meal
- Irimame – dry-roasted soy beans and black soy beans (used in kakimochi, etc.)

=== Vegetable proteins ===
- Fu – wheat gluten
  - Nama fu – fresh fu usually sold in sticks (long bars)
  - Dry fu – variously shaped and colored. Kuruma-bu is one variety
  - Chikuwabu – somewhat more doughy (still has starches left)
- Tofu
  - Soft: kinugoshi-dōfu (silken), oboro-dōfu, kumidashi-dōfu
  - Firm: momen-dōfu (cotton)
  - Freeze-dried: kōyadōfu
  - Fried: aburaage, agedōfu, atsuage, ganmodoki
  - Residue: okara
  - Soy milk
  - Yuba

== Animal sources ==
=== Eggs ===
- Chicken
- Quail egg
- Terrapin eggs, sea-turtle eggs

=== Meats ===
- Beef
  - Kobe beef
  - Matsusaka beef
  - Mishima beef
  - Beef tongue, heart, liver, tripe, rumen (mino), omasum (senmai), abomasum (giara)
- Chicken – called kashiwa in Western parts (Kansai). There are various heritage breeds called jidori
  - Nagoya cochin
  - Shamo – fighting cock
  - Hinai jidori – hinaidori × Rhode Island red
  - Unlaid egg yolk (tamahimo)
- Pork
  - Kurobuta (Berkshire (pig))
  - agū or shimabuta, extinct but reconstructed heritage hog of Okinawa
  - Inobuta – a domestic pig × wild boar crossbreed
  - Boar meat – the nabe (hotpot) dish is called botan nabe ("peony")
  - Whey buta – marketed by Hanamaki Bokujō
- Horse meat, sometimes called sakura-niku – a delicacy. Raw sliced horsemeat is called basashi; the fatty neck portion from where the mane grows is known as tategami.

=== Finned fish ===
==== Marine fishes ====
- (red-fleshed fish or akami zakana)
- skipjack tuna (katsuo) - made into tataki, namaribushi, and processed into katsuobushi
  - soda-gatsuo
- tuna (maguro)
- Japanese amberjack (buri / hamachi)
- Spanish mackerel (sawara)

==== Blue-backed fish ====
These fish are collectively called ao zakana in Japanese.

- Japanese jack mackerel (aji)
- pacific saury (sanma)
- sardine (iwashi)
  - Niboshi or iriko is dried sardine, important for fish stock and other uses.
- mackerel (saba)
- kohada or kohada (Konosirus punctatus)
- herring (nishin)
- aji (Japanese horse mackerel and similar fish) - typical fish for hiraki, or fish that is gutted, butterflied, and half-dried in shade.

==== White-fleshed fish ====
These fish are collectively called shiromi zakana in Japanese.

- flatfish (karei / hirame) - ribbons of flesh around the fins called engawa are also used. Roe is often stewed.
- pike conger (hamo) - in Kyoto-style cuisine, also as high-end surimi.
- pufferfish (fugu) - flesh, skin, soft roe eaten as sashimi and hot pot (tecchiri); organs, etc. poisonous; roe also contain tetrodotoxin but a regional specialty food cures it in nuka until safe to eat.
- tilefish (amadai) - in a Kyoto-style preparation, it is roasted to be eaten scales and all; used in high-end surimi.
- red sea bream (madai) - used widely. the head stewed as kabuto-ni.

==== Freshwater fish ====
- ayu - the shiokara made from this fish is called uruka.
- Japanese eel (unagi)
- gori (Japanese fish) - refers regionally to different fish, but often the goby type, some are high-end fish.
- salmon (sake) - shiojake or salted salmon are often very salty fillets, so lighter salted amajio types may be sought. aramaki-jake is salt-cured whole fish. hizu-namasu uses snout cartilage.
- suzuki
- Japanese icefish (Family Salangidae)
- nigoro buna (Carassius auratus grandoculis) - vital source of funazushi for Shiga-kennians

=== Marine mammals ===
- baleen whale (kujira)
- dolphin (iruka)

=== Mollusks ===
==== Squid and cuttlefish ====
These fish are collectively called ika in Japanese.

- (aori ika)
- (surume ika)
- (kensaki ika)
- (yari ika)
- (hotaru ika)
- (kō ika)

==== Octopus ====
Octopus is called tako in Japanese.

- Common octopus (madako)
- Giant Pacific octopus (mizudako)
- Amphioctopus fangsiao (iidako)

==== Bivalves ====
- scallop (hotate-gai)
- littleneck clam (asari)
- freshwater clam (shijimi)
- oyster (kaki)
  - iwagaki (Crassostrea nippona), available during summer months.
- clam (hamaguri)
- (akagai)
- (aoyagi)
- Geoduck (mirugai)
- (torigai)

==== Single shelled gastropods and conches ====
- horned turban (sazae)
- abalone (awabi)

=== Crustaceans ===
These foods are collectively called ebikani-rui or kokaku rui in Japanese.

==== Crab ====
Crab is called kani in Japanese.

- snow crab (zuwaigani)
- horsehair crab (kegani)
- king crab (tarabagani; hanasaki gani=Paralithodes brevipes)
- horse crab (gazami)
- Kona crab (asahi-gani)

==== Lobsters, shrimps, and prawns ====
These shellfish are collectively called ebi in Japanese.

- spiny lobster (ise-ebi)
- Kuruma prawn (kuruma ebi)
- humpback shrimp (botan ebi; Pandalus hypsinotus)
- mantis shrimp - (shako)
- barnacle
- kawaebi (Palaemon paucidens) - freshwater

=== Echinoderms ===
- Sea cucumbers (namako) - body, intestines (konowata), ovaries (kuchiko, konoko)
- Sea urchin (uni), ovaries

=== Tunicates ===
- Sea pineapple (hoya)

=== Roe ===
- salmon roe (ikura)
- herring roe (kazunoko)
- mullet roe (karasumi) - similar to botargo
- pollock roe (tarako (food))
- capelin roe (masago)
- flying fish roe (tobiko)
- crustacean eggs

=== Liver ===
- ankimo, or monkfish liver.
- kawahagi (Thread-sail filefish) and abalone livers are used as is, or as kimo-ae, i.e., blended with the fish flesh or other ingredients as a type of aemono.
- squid and katsuo (skipjack) livers and guts, used to make shiokara.

=== Processed seafood ===
- anchovy (katakuchi-iwashi), dried to make Niboshi. The larvae are shirasu and made into Tatami iwashi
- chikuwa
- himono (non-salted dried fish) - some products are bone dry and stiff, incl. ei-hire (skate fins), surume (dried squid), but often refer to fish still supple and succulent.
- kamaboko, satsuma age, etc., comprise a class of food called nerimono, and are listed under surimi products.
- niboshi
- shiokara of various kinds, made from the guts and other portions.

=== Insects ===
Some insects have been considered regional delicacies, though often categorized as getemono or bizarre food.

- hachinoko, larvae and pupae of kurosuzumebachi or yellowjacket spp.
- inago no tsukudani, tsukudani made from locusts that infest rice fields. It used to be pretty common wherever rice was grown.
- zazamushi tsukudani, tsukudani made from stonefly and caddisfly larvae in streams (specialty of Ina, Nagano area).

== See also ==
- List of Japanese cooking utensils
- List of Japanese dishes
- List of Japanese condiments
- List of sushi and sashimi ingredients
- Sansai
