= Sancho (disambiguation) =

Sancho is an Iberian name of Basque origin.

Sancho may also refer to:

- Sancho (horse), a British Thoroughbred racehorse
- Sancho, West Virginia
- Mu Arae e, an extrasolar planet
- Sancho (spice), a culinary spice used in Korea made from Zanthoxylum schinifolium
- Jadon Sancho, an English Footballer
- Ignatius Sancho, a British abolitionist, writer, and composer
- Sancho, a fictional member of the Sleep Deprived podcast
- Sancho, an album by Australian band The Whitlams
