= Shichimiya =

Japanese spice manufacturer

Shichimiya Honpo
- Native name: 七味家本舗
- Industry: Food and Restaurant
- Founded: 1655 (Kawachiya); 1951 (Shichimiya Honpo, Inc.)
- Headquarters: Kiyomizu-dera, Kyoto, Japan
- Website: www.shichimiya.co.jp

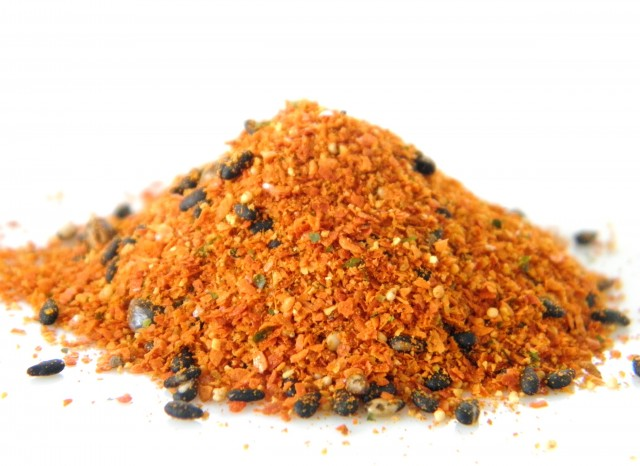
Shichimi tougarashi spice

Shichimiya Honpo is one of the oldest spice manufacturers in Japan founded in 1655 under the name Kawachiya (河内屋) and is located near the famous Kiyomizu Temple in Kyoto. Its current name was established in 1951.

The basic facts:

- Shichimiya Honpo is a special shichimi shop located on the way to Kiyomizu temple.
- In 1655 it was founded using the name Kawachiya and was a place to welcome priests who came back from devotions under a waterfall.
- Shichimi is a unique spice invented in Kyoto and Shichimiya Honpo is one of 3 most popular shichimi shops in Japan, beside Yagenbori in Tokyo and Yahataya in Nagano Prefecture.
- Shichimi ingredients include:
  - shiso - Asian culinary herb Perilla frutescens var. crispa
  - sanshō - native Japan herb
  - yuzu - citrus junos.
- The shichimi from Shichimiya Honpo has a special taste, because it used less red pepper and more sanshō and white sesame.

== See also ==
- List of oldest companies
