= Sancho (spice) =

Korean spice

Sancho (Korean: 산초; Hanja: 山椒) is a Korean spice made from Zanthoxylum schinifolium, which is less bitter than chopi made from Zanthoxylum piperitum. In Korean cuisine, sancho is often used to accompany fish soups such as chueo-tang.
