= List of Japanese condiments =

This is a list of Japanese condiments by type.

== Basic ==
=== Mirin ===
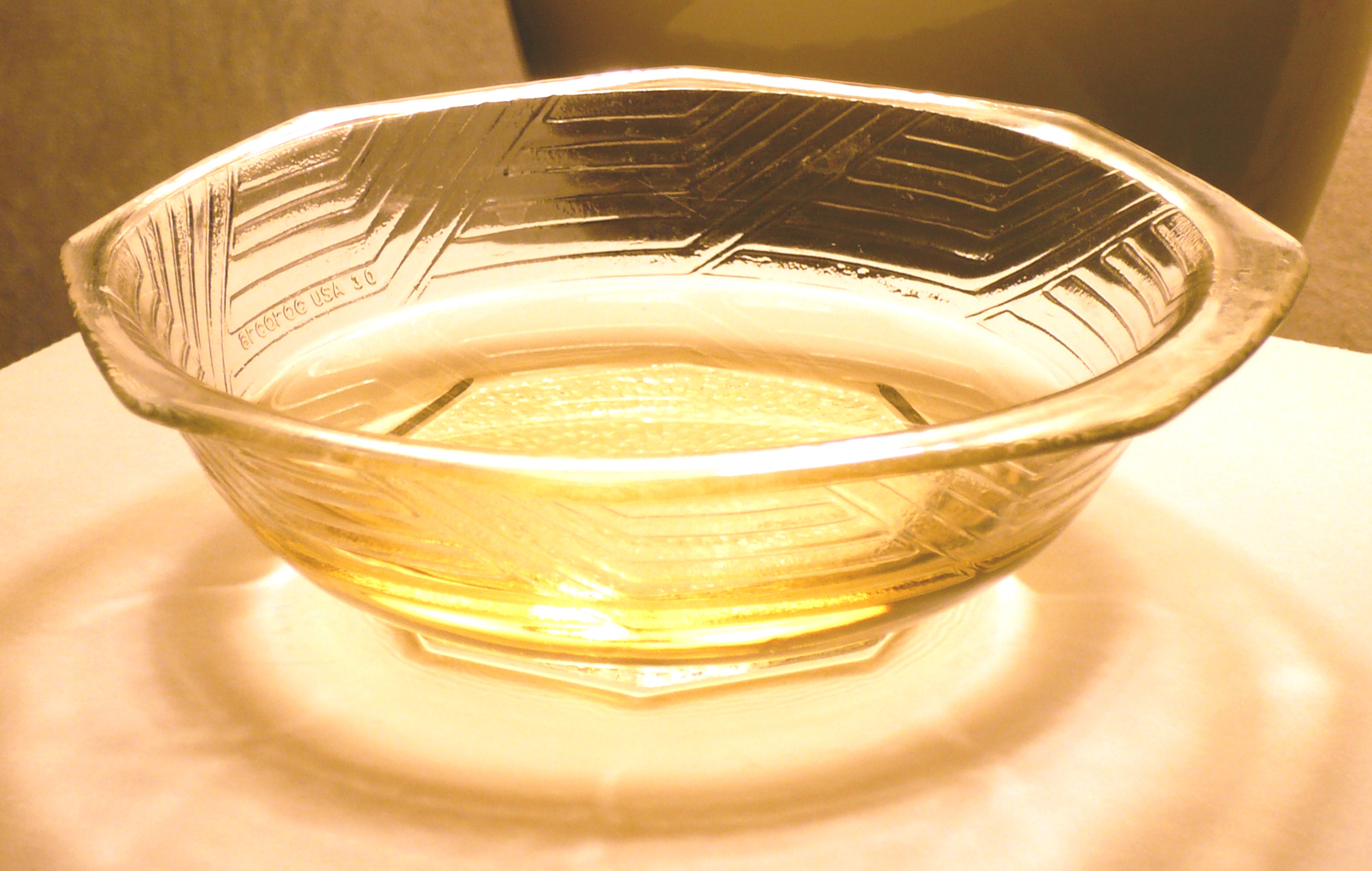
A bowl of mirin

Mirin (みりん; also 味醂) is an essential condiment used in Japanese cuisine. It is a kind of rice wine similar to sake, but with a lower alcohol content—14% instead of 20%. There are three general types. The first is hon mirin (lit. true mirin), which contains alcohol. The second is shio mirin, which contains alcohol as well as 1.5% salt to avoid alcohol tax. The third is shin mirin (lit. new mirin), or mirin-fu chomiryo (lit. mirin-like seasoning), which contains less than 1% alcohol yet retains the same flavour.

=== Rice vinegar ===
Rice vinegar (よねず; also 米酢) is a very mild and mellow vinegar and ranges in colour from colourless to pale yellow. There are two distinct types of Japanese vinegar: one is made from fermented rice and the other, known as awasezu or seasoned rice vinegar, is made by adding sake, salt and sugar. Seasoned rice vinegar is used in sushi and in salad dressing varieties popular in the West, such as ginger or sesame dressing. Rice vinegar can be mixed with salt and sugar to make sushi vinegar, used to season the rice used in sushi.

Seasoned rice vinegar is a condiment made of sake, sugar and salt. Besides these three necessary ingredients, mirin is also sometimes used. It is used frequently in Japanese cuisine, together with Japanese round rice to make sushi kome (sushi rice). Although it can be made at home, prepared awasezu is readily available at supermarkets.

=== Soy sauce ===
Soy sauce, or shōyu (しょうゆ; also 醤油), is a fermented sauce made from soybeans (soya beans), roasted grain, water and salt. It is traditionally divided into five main categories depending on differences in ingredients and method of production. Most Japanese soy sauces include wheat as a primary ingredient, which tends to give them a slightly sweeter taste than their Chinese counterparts. They also tend toward an alcoholic sherry-like flavor, due to the addition of alcohol in the product. Not all soy sauces are interchangeable.

Soy sauce was introduced into Japan in the 7th century. The Japanese word tamari is derived from the verb tamaru that signifies "to accumulate", referring to the fact that tamari was traditionally from the liquid byproduct produced during the fermentation of miso. Japan is the leading producer of tamari.

== Sauces and pastes ==
=== Daikon ===
Tsuma and oroshi are edible garnishes using daikon. Both can be dipped. Tsuma is used as sashimi's accompaniment and oroshi is frequently used as a garnish. The pink spicy momiji-oroshi (もみじおろし, literally "autumn-leaf-red grated (daikon)") is daikon grated with chili pepper. When oroshi covers part of a dish, it is often called mizore, which means 'soft snow' in Japanese.

=== Karashi ===
Karashi is a type of mustard used as a condiment or seasoning in Japanese cuisine. Karashi is made from the crushed seeds of Brassica juncea, frequently mixed with wasabi or horseradish to add zest. Karashi is not usually sweetened nor thinned with a liquid. However, it can be used as part of a dipping sauce when mixed with mayonnaise or ketchup.

Karashi is often served with fish tempura dishes, with tonkatsu, oden, nattō, and gyōza. It is almost always served with karashinasu, pickled Japanese eggplant (茄子). Depending on the meal, karashi may be the only condiment served, or it may be served alongside wasabi.

=== Mentsuyu ===
Mentsuyu (めんつゆ; also 麺汁) is a condiment made from dashi, soy sauce, mirin and sugar. Mentsuyu is most often eaten as a dipping sauce with sōmen, soba, udon and hiyamugi.

=== Ponzu ===
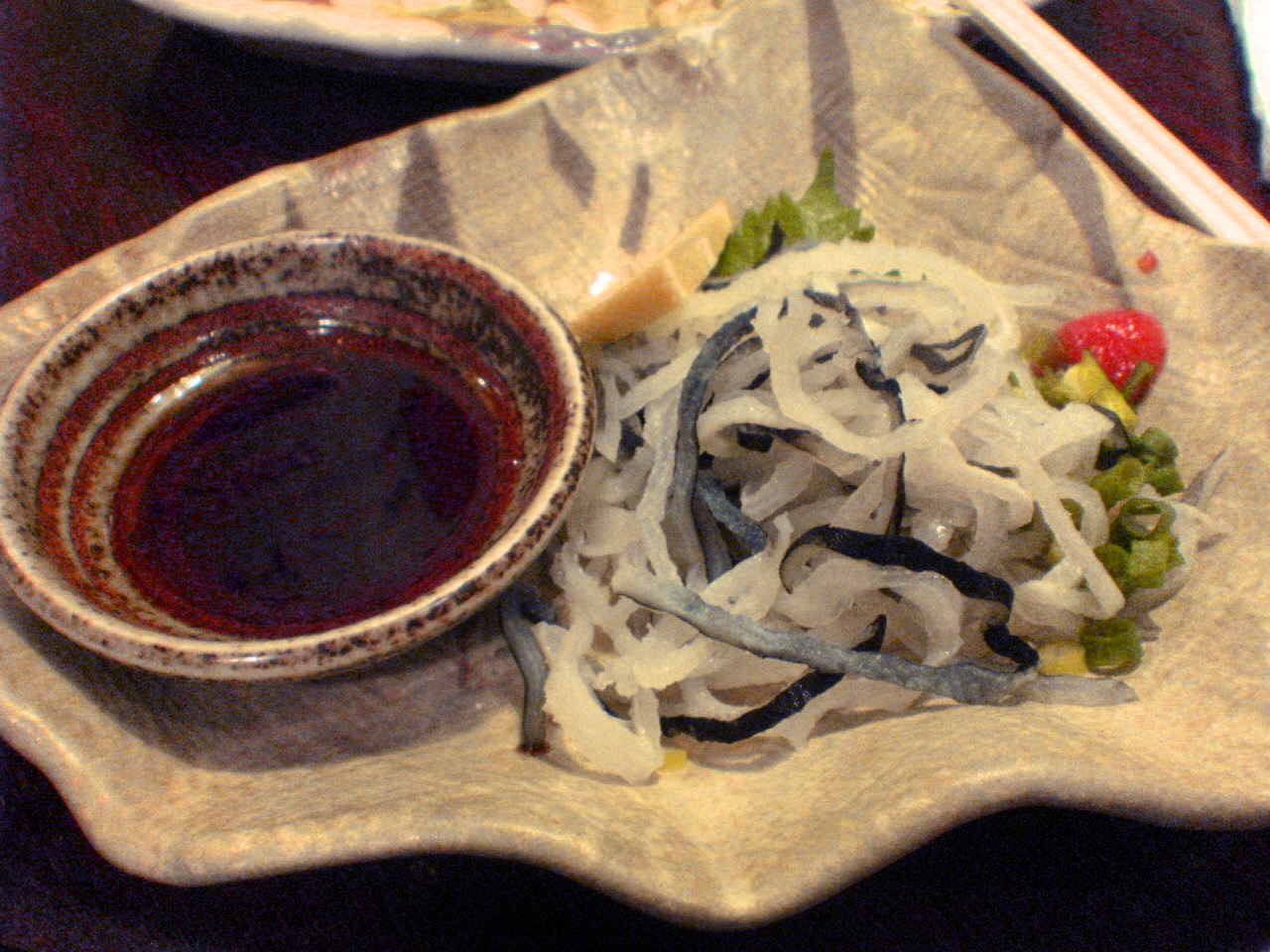
Ponzu shoyu (left) and Fugu

Ponzu is a citrus-based sauce commonly used in Japanese cuisine. It is very tart in flavor, with a thin, watery consistency and a light brown color. Ponzu shōyu or ponzu jōyu is ponzu sauce with soy sauce (shōyu) added, and the mixed product is widely referred to as simply ponzu. It is made by boiling mirin, rice vinegar, katsuobushi flakes, and seaweed (konbu) over medium heat. The liquid is cooled and strained to remove the katsuobushi flakes. Finally, the juice of yuzu, sudachi, daidai, and kabosu, or lemon is added.

=== Rayu ===
Rayu is chili-infused vegetable oil (a type of chili oil), used in Chinese cuisine as a cooking ingredient or as a condiment. The oil is typically sesame oil and the chili pepper used is typically red, imparting a reddish tint to the oil. Other ingredients used may include soy oil, corn oil, dried aloe, ginger, guava leaves, leek leaves, paprika, and turmeric.

=== Warishita ===
Warishita is a Japanese sauce consisting of salt, sugar, and soy sauce, used, for example, in preparing sukiyaki. See also the Japanese article.

=== Wasabi ===
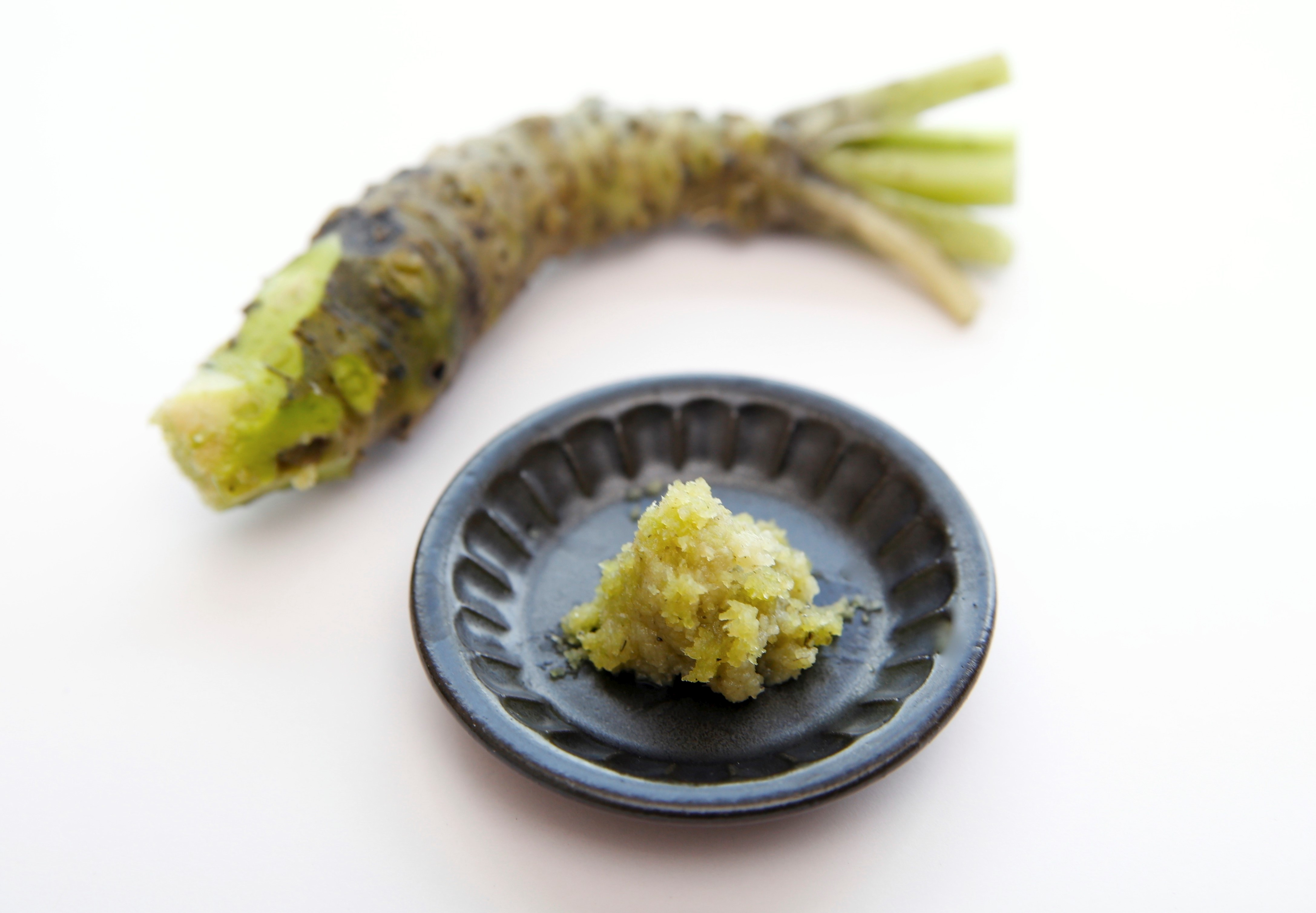
Wasabi has a spicy flavor similar to that of horseradish.

Wasabi is a member of the family Brassicaceae, which includes cabbages, horseradish and mustard. Known as "Japanese horseradish", its root is used as a spice and has an extremely strong flavour. Its hotness is more akin to that of a hot mustard than the capsaicin in a chili pepper, producing vapors that irritate the nasal passages more than the tongue. The plant grows naturally along stream beds in mountain river valleys in Japan. There are also other species used, such as W. koreana, and W. tetsuigi. The two main cultivars in the marketplace are W. japonica cv. 'Daruma' and cv. 'Mazuma', but there are many others.

Wasabi is generally sold either in the form of a root which must be very finely grated before use, or as a ready-to-use paste (either real wasabi or a mixture of horseradish, mustard and food coloring), usually in tubes approximately the size and shape of travel toothpaste tubes. The paste form is commonly horseradish-based, since fresh wasabi is extremely perishable and more expensive than horseradish. Once the paste is prepared it should remain covered until served to protect the flavor from evaporation. For this reason, sushi chefs usually put the wasabi between the fish and the rice.

== Toppings ==
=== Furikake ===
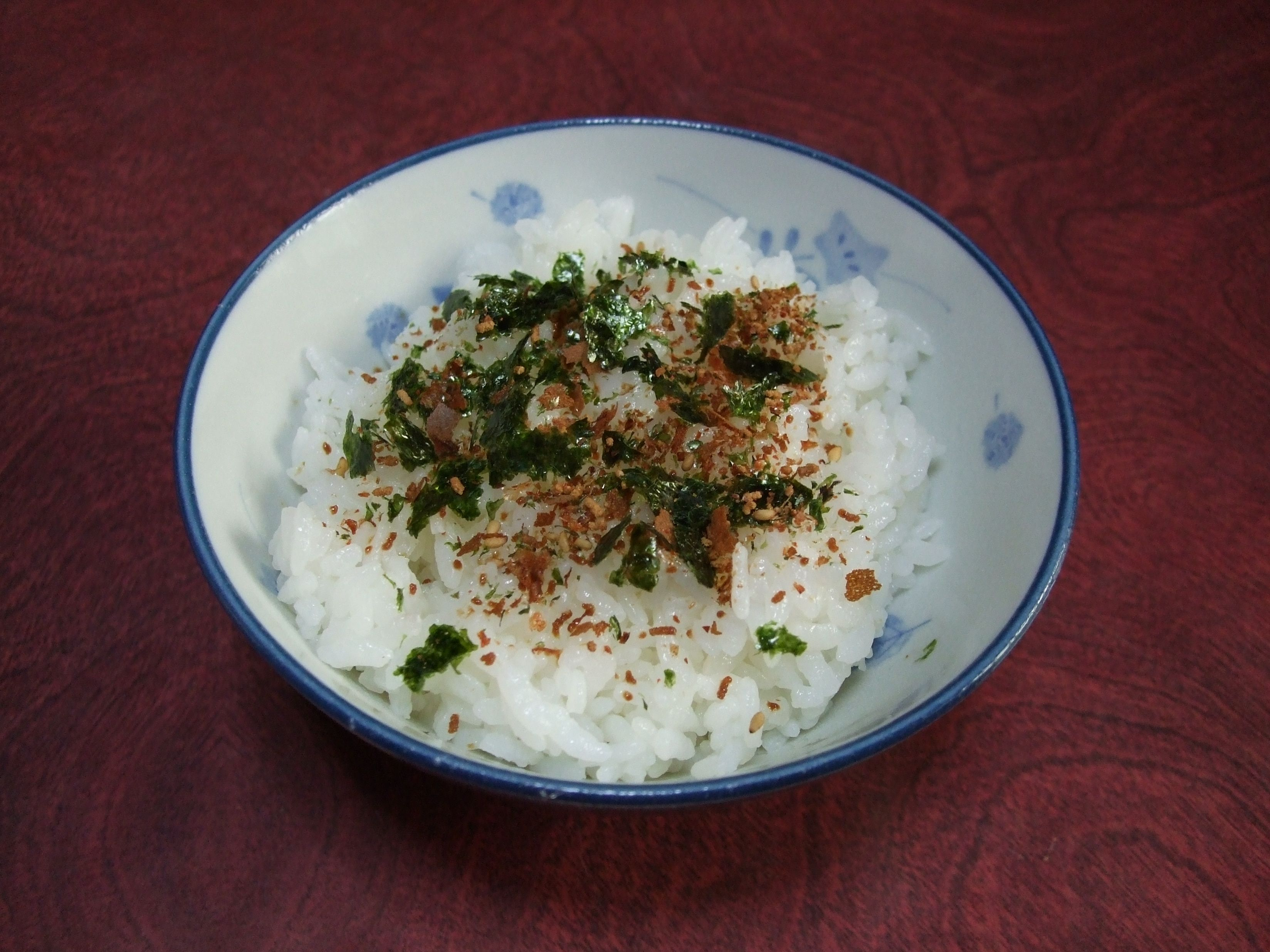
Furikake sprinkled on rice

Furikake is a dry Japanese condiment meant to be sprinkled on top of rice. It typically consists of a mixture of dried and ground fish, sesame seeds, chopped seaweed, sugar, salt, and monosodium glutamate. Other flavorful ingredients such as katsuobushi (sometimes indicated on the package as bonito), salmon, shiso, egg, and vegetables are often added to the mix.

=== Mayonnaise ===
Mayonnaise is typically made with apple cider vinegar or rice vinegar and a small amount of MSG, which gives it a different flavor profile from mayonnaise made from distilled vinegar. It is most often sold in soft plastic squeeze bottles. Its texture is thinner than most Western commercial mayonnaise. A variety containing karashi (Japanese mustard) is also common.

Apart from salads, it is popular with dishes such as okonomiyaki, takoyaki and yakisoba and usually accompanies katsu and karaage. It is sometimes served with cooked vegetables, or mixed with soy sauce or wasabi and used as dips. In the Tōkai region, it is a frequent condiment on hiyashi chūka (cold noodle salad). Many fried seafood dishes are served with a side of mayonnaise for dipping. It is also not uncommon for Japanese to use mayonnaise in place of tomato sauce on pizza.

=== Menma ===
Menma is a Japanese condiment made from dried bamboo. It is a common topping for noodle soup and ramen. Menma is also known as shinachiku (シナチク), but this term is now being phased out due to the negative connotations of the word Shina.

=== Wafu dressing ===
Wafu dressing is a vinaigrette-type salad dressing based on soy sauce, popular in Japan. The name literally means "Japanese-style dressing". The standard wafu dressing consists of a mixture of Japanese soy sauce, rice vinegar and vegetable oil. There are many variations flavoured with additional ingredients such as aonori, grated ginger, umeboshi puree, wasabi or citrus fruits such as yuzu.

== See also ==
- List of condiments
- List of Japanese cooking utensils
- List of Japanese ingredients
- List of Japanese dishes
- Poke, a raw fish salad with Japanese influences served as an appetizer, main course in Hawaiian cuisine
