= Togarashi =

Tōgarashi (唐辛子) is Japanese for genus Capsicum, or specifically the species Capsicum annuum, and commonly translated as chili pepper. When the term is used in English, it refers to any number of chili peppers or chili pepper-related products from Japan, including:

- Shichimi, or Shichimi tōgarashi, a condiment that is a mixture of seven different ingredients that varies by maker
- Shishito, or Shishi tōgarashi, a small, mild variety of Capsicum annuum
- Niji-iro Tōgarashi, a 1990 manga series
