= Agemochi =

Japanese snack food made from rice

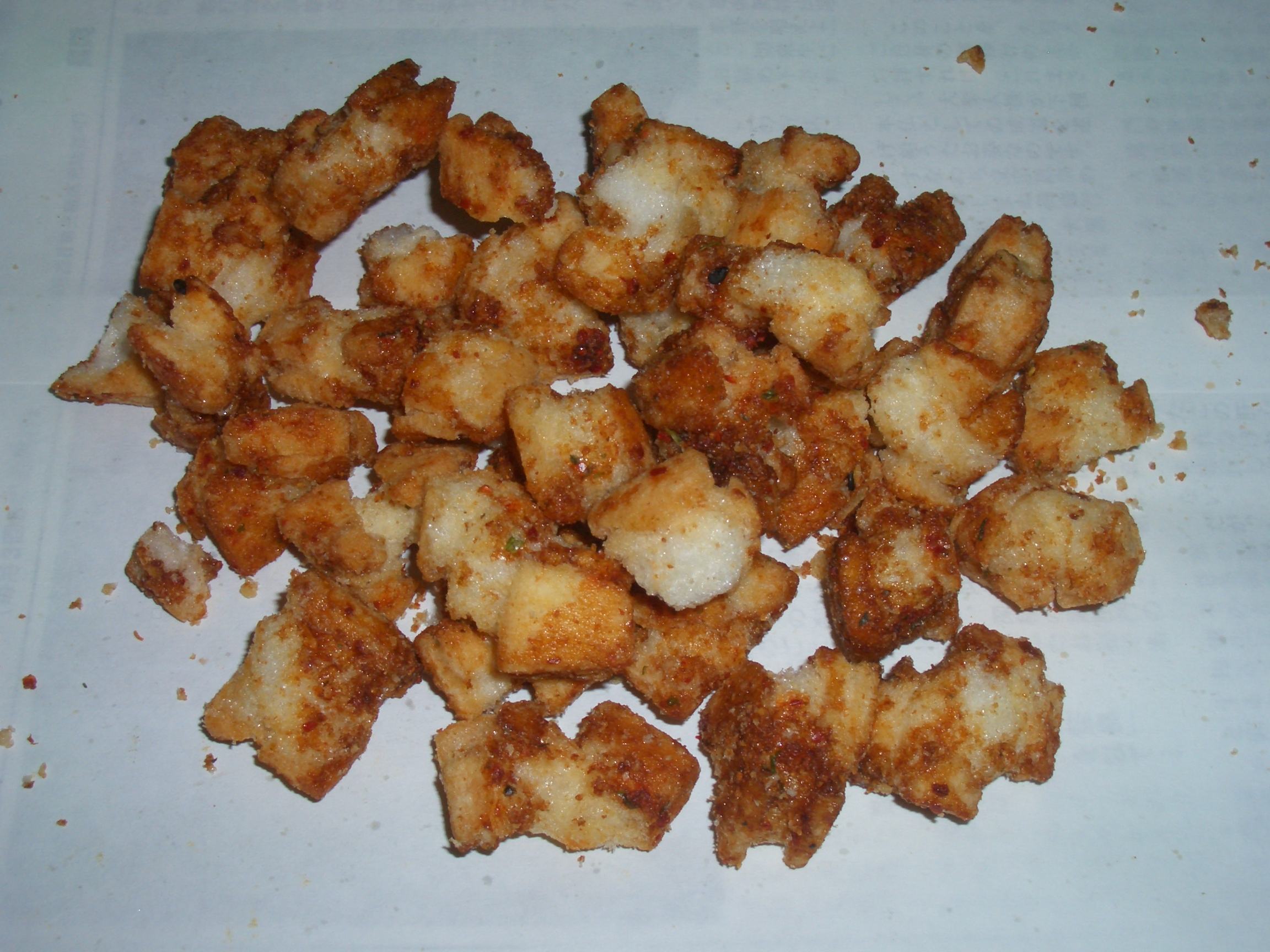
- Shichimi flavoured agemochi
- Type: Snack
- Place of origin: Japan
- Main ingredients: Mochi

Agemochi (揚げ餅) is a popular Japanese snack food made from fried mochi (sticky rice). The dry mochi is broken into small pieces, about 1 cm cubed, and deep fried. The pieces then puff up. It is usually eaten lightly salted, but also various flavoured versions are made, such as shichimi agemochi, which is agemochi covered with shichimi seasoning. Agemochi can be purchased over most of Japan, and is also a common home-made snack.
