= Tsukudajima =

Island in Tokyo Bay, Japan

Coordinates: 35.667570°N 139.782672°E

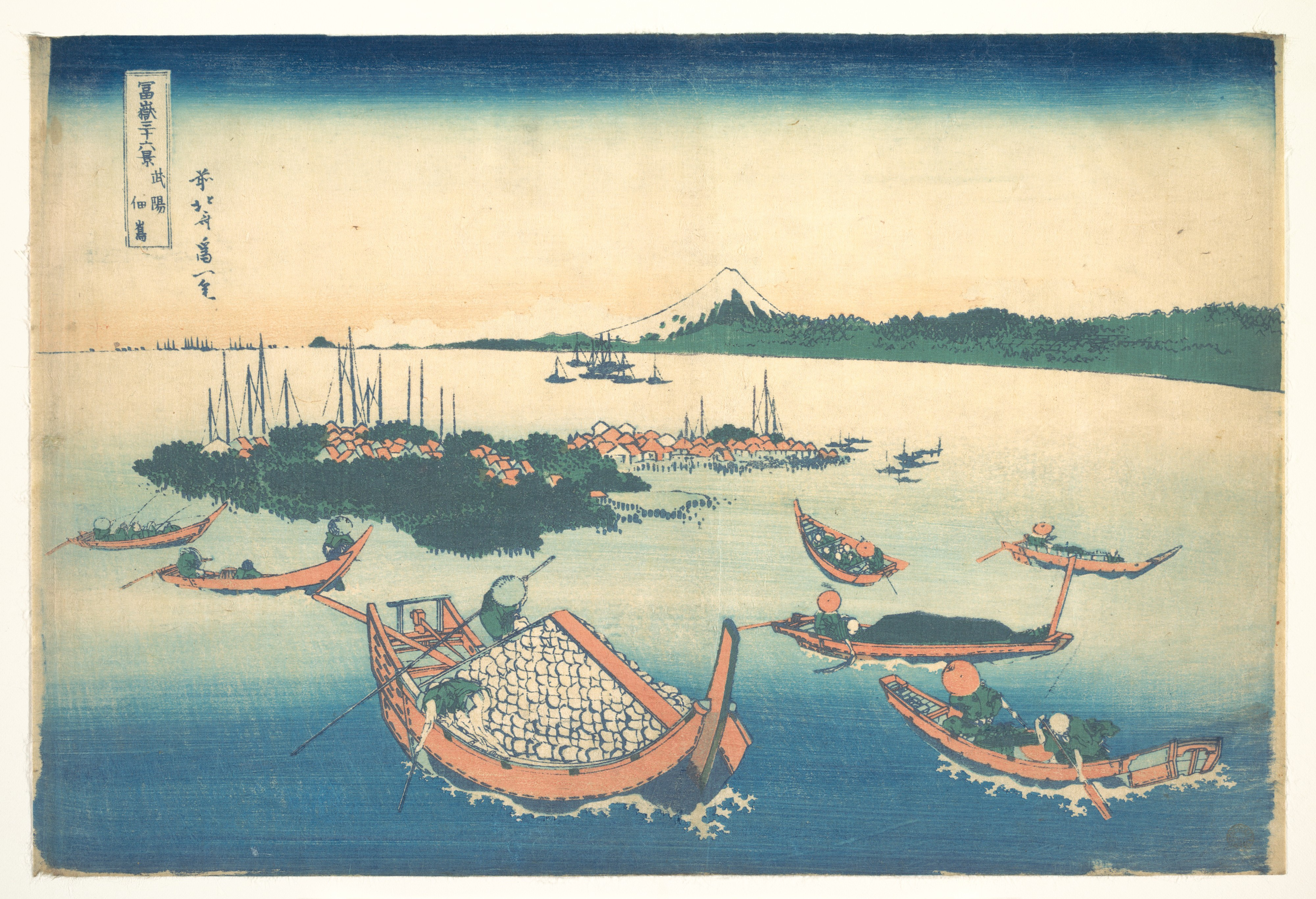
Tsukudajima in Musashi Province (Buyō Tsukudajima), from the series Thirty-six Views of Mount Fuji (Fugaku sanjūrokkei) 冨嶽三十六景 武陽佃島.

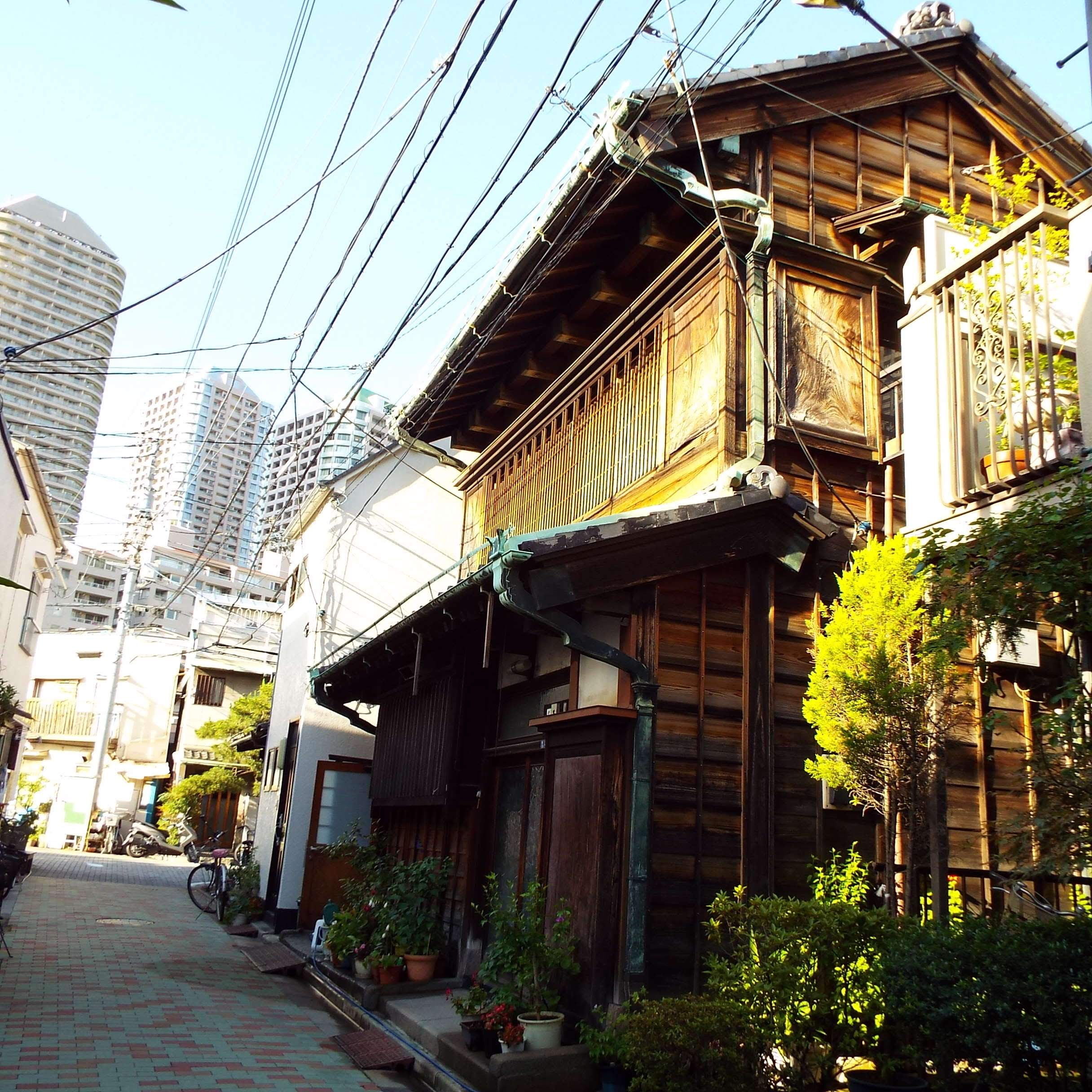
An old house in Tsukudajima.

Tsukudajima (佃島, "Tsukuda Island") is a small island in Tokyo Bay, facing Tsukiji to its west. Originally, Tsukudajima was a tiny island at the mouth of the Edogawa river in Tokyo Bay. It was inhabited by a fishing community who migrated from Osaka in early 1600s. It is home to the famous dish Tsukudani (佃煮). The high-rise district of Tsukishima was built next to Tsukudajima on reclaimed land.

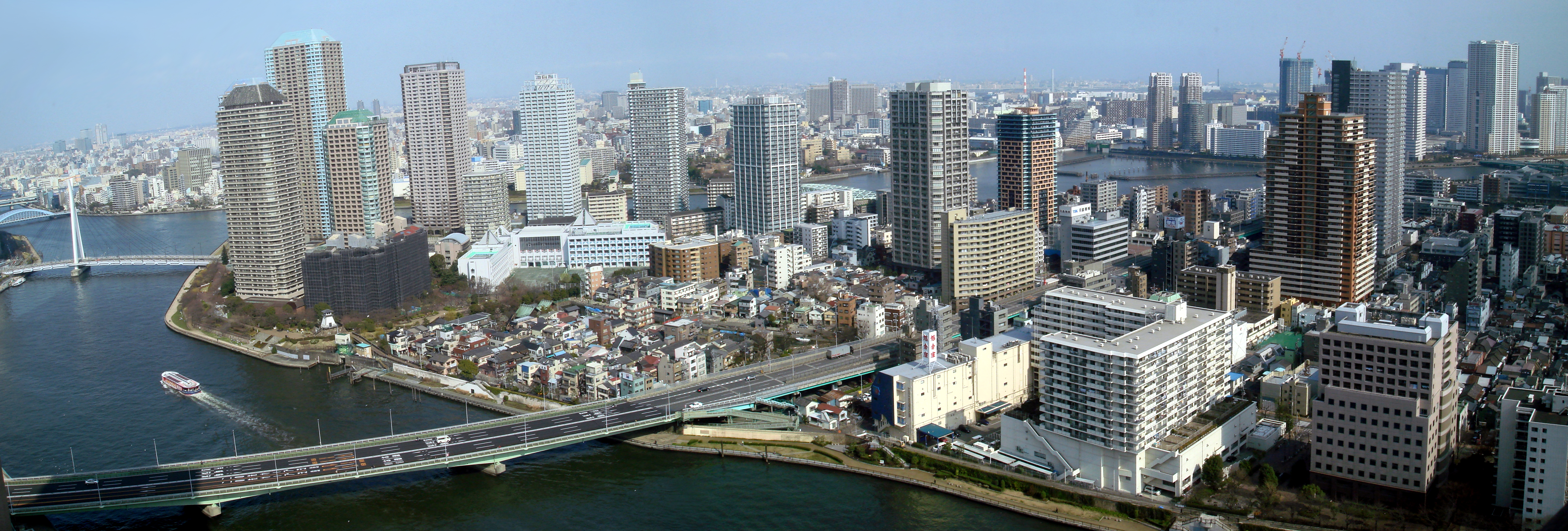
Upper portion of Tsukishima (island neighborhood), Chūō Ward, Tokyo, Japan. Tsukudajima, with its small houses, appears at the forefront. The Sumida River crosses in the foreground; the bridge on the bottom left is the Tsukuda Bridge (Tsukuda Ohashi), above that is the white Chou Bridge (Chuo Ohashi), and above that the blue Eitai Bridge (Eitai-bashi).

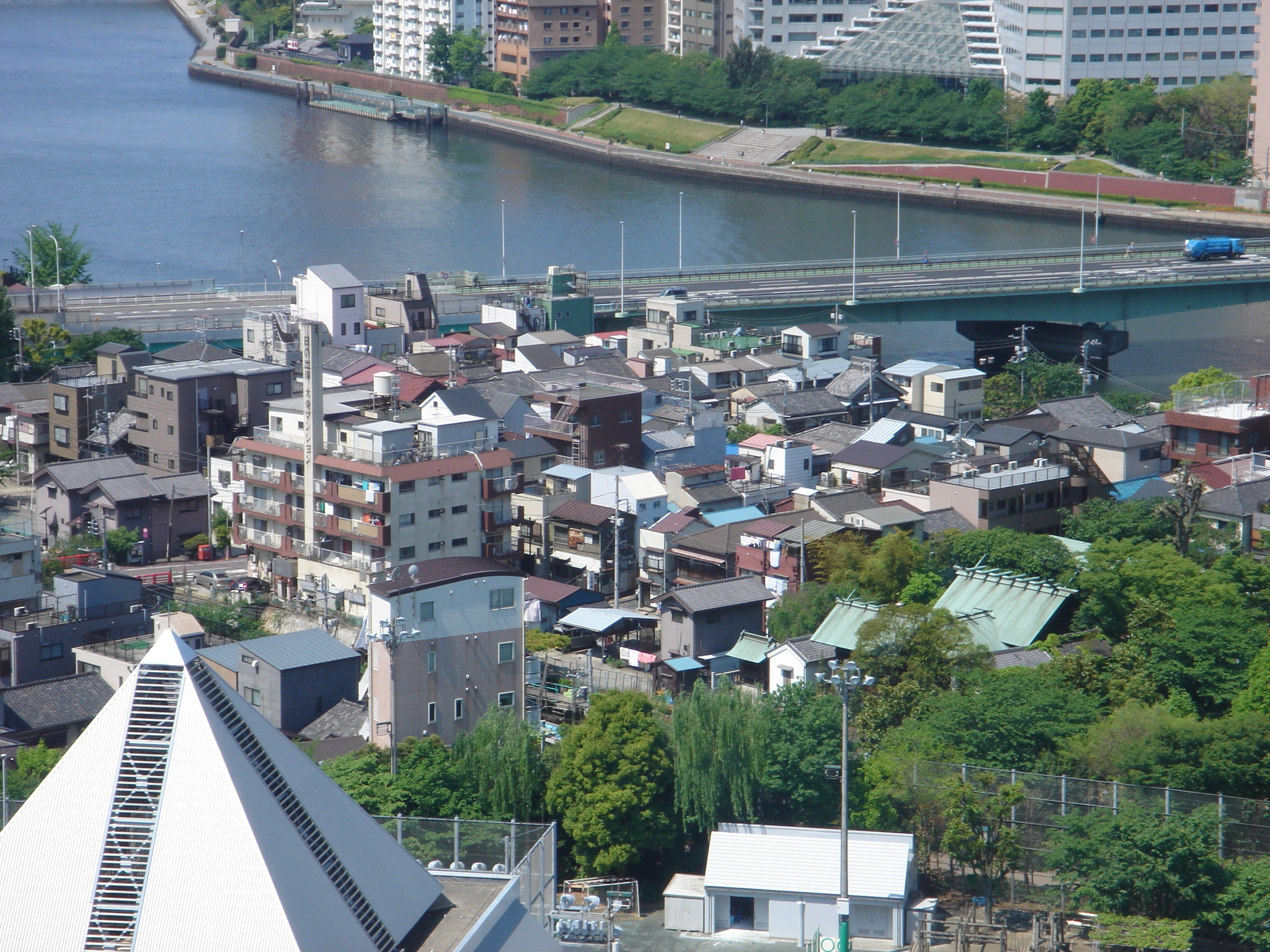
Tsukudajima, with its traditional buildings and the Tsukuda Bridge (Tsukuda Ohashi).

== Education ==
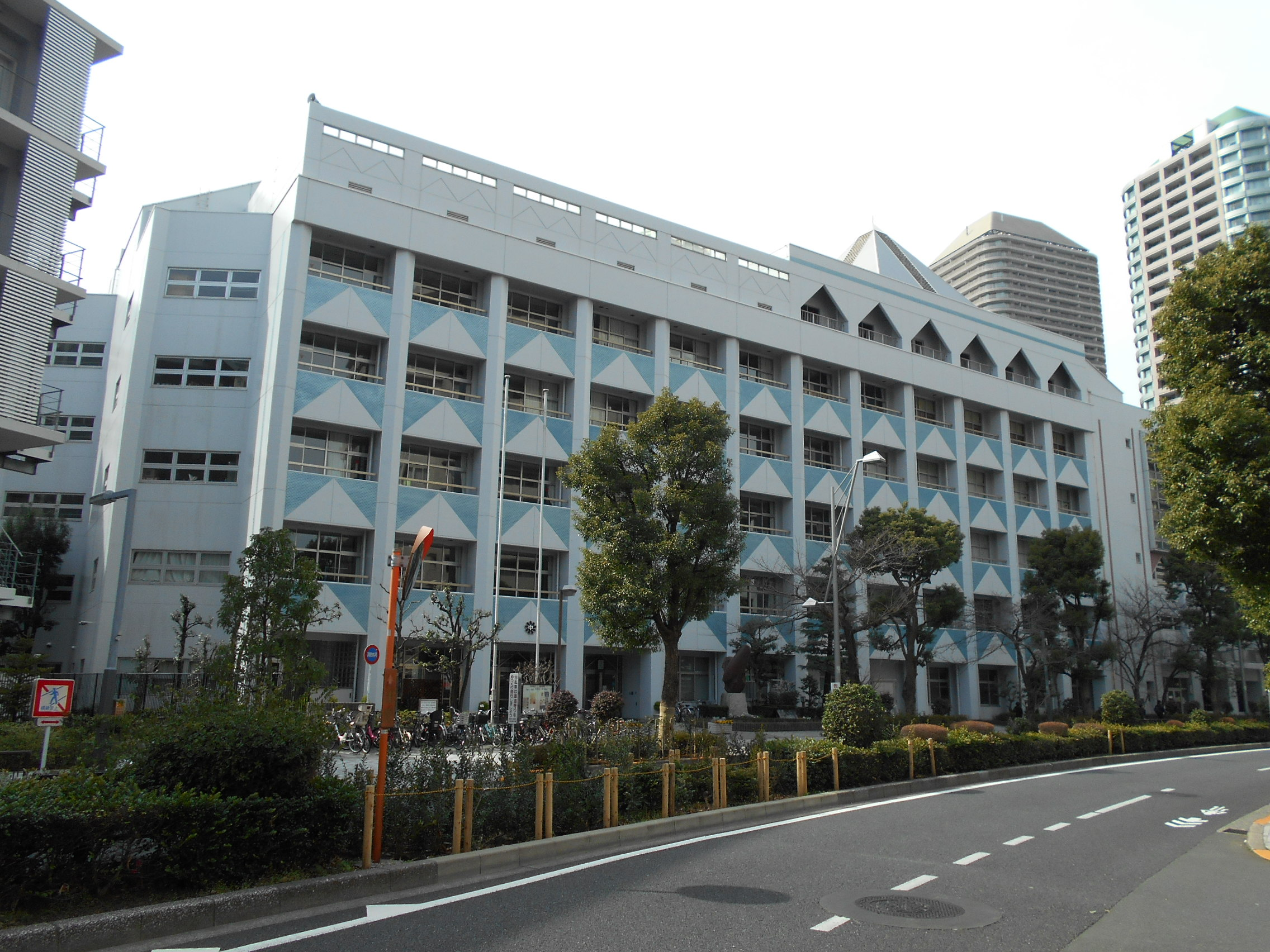
Tsukuda Junior High School (佃中学校)

Public elementary and junior high schools are operated by Chuo City Board of Education.

Zoned elementary schools for Tsukuda include:

- Tsukudajima Elementary School (佃島小学校)'s boundary includes all of 1-chome and 2-chome
- Tsukishima Daiichi (Tsukishima No. 1) Elementary School (月島第一小学校)'s boundary includes all of 3-chome

All of Tsukuda is zoned to Tsukuda Junior High School (佃中学校).

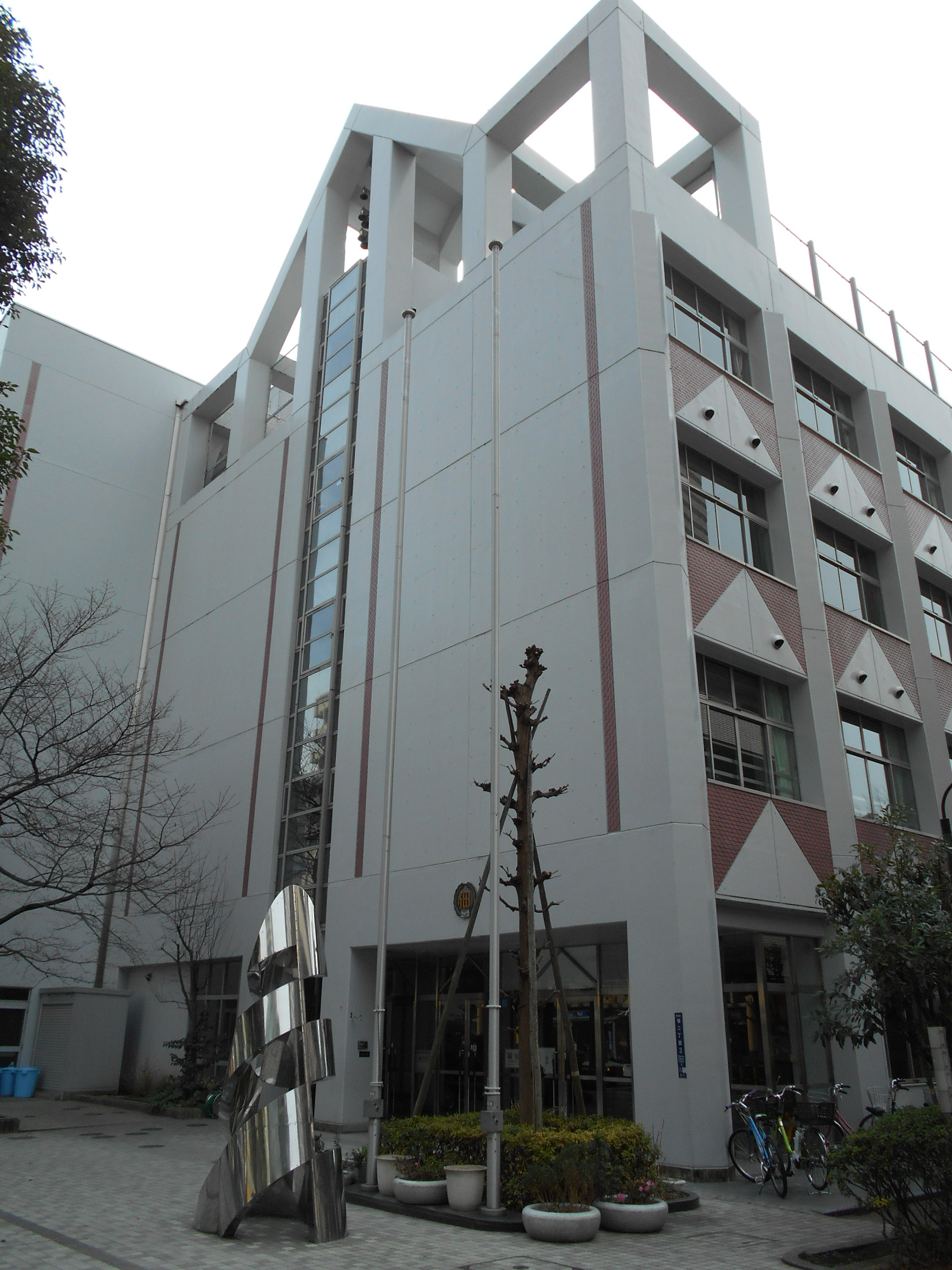
Tsukudajima Elementary School (佃島小学校), which serves 1 and 2-chome
