= Niboshi =

Japanese dish of dried infant sardines

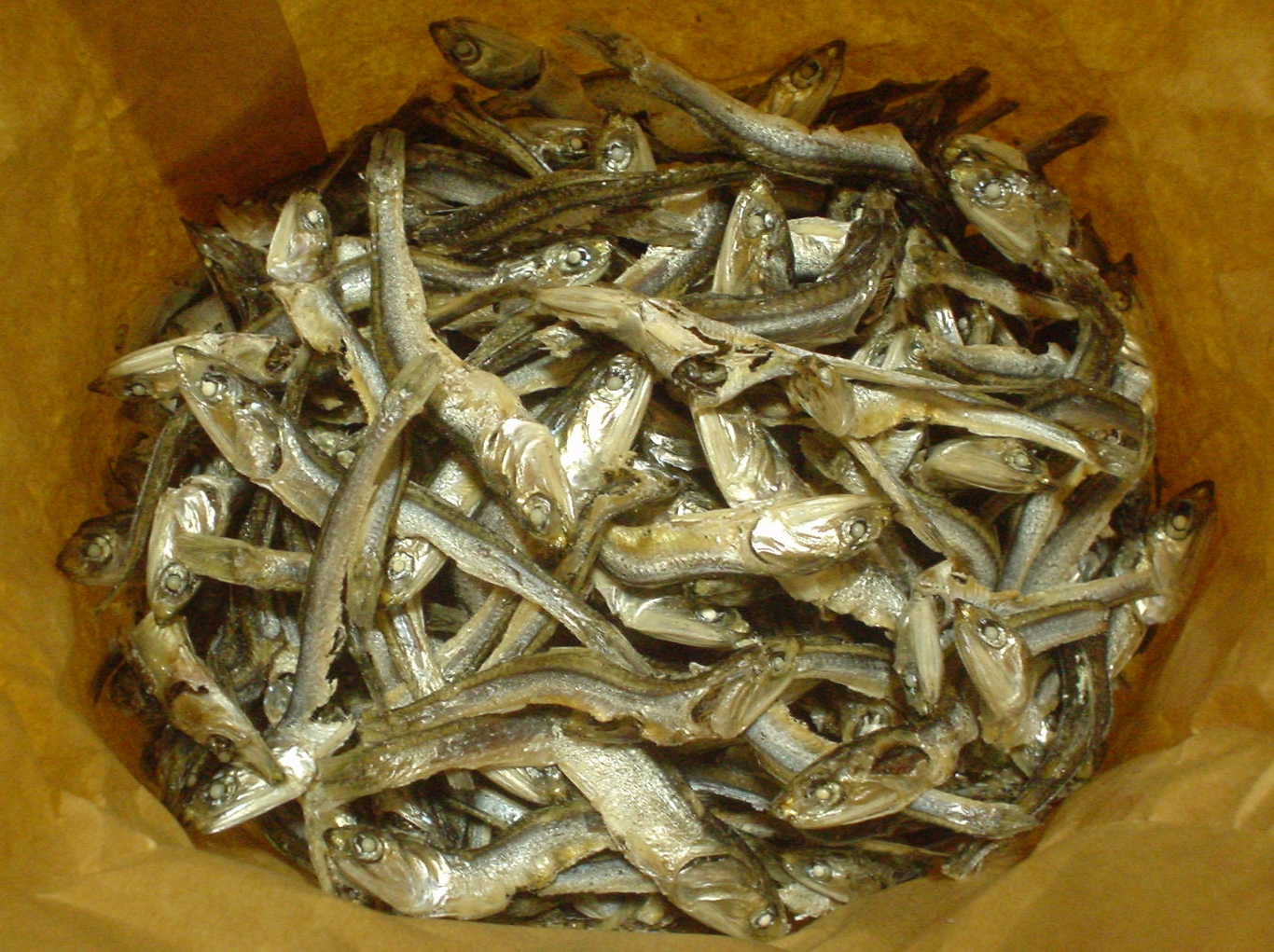
- Dried niboshi
- Type: Soup stock
- Place of origin: Japan
- Associated cuisine: Japanese cuisine
- Main ingredients: Dried fish
- Similar dishes: Katsuobushi

Niboshi (煮干し), often called iriko (炒り子) in Western Japan, are small dried fish used in Japanese cuisine for making dashi (soup stock). They can also be eaten as snacks, or as a side dish. The types of fish used include anchovies, sardines, round herring, sand lance, and others. Niboshi made of anchovies are the most common.

== Name ==
The word niboshi (煮干し) literally means "boiled" or "dried", and it does not include the specific name of the ingredient. For this reason, niboshi is translated both as "dried sardine" and "dried anchovy".

The translation of the term niboshi is an object of confusion among Japanese speakers, in terms of whether it is sardines or anchovies, because in Japanese, both sardine and anchovy are referred to as iwashi (イワシ).

== Usage ==
In Japan, niboshi dashi is one of the more common forms of dashi. It is especially popular as the base stock when making miso soup. Niboshi dashi is made by soaking niboshi in plain water. If left overnight or brought nearly to a boil, the flavor of niboshi permeates the water to make the stock.

Niboshi are also cooked and served as snacks. They are eaten as one of the symbolic foods during the Japanese New Year, referred to as osechi. Tazukuri (fried sweet and savory sardines) are made by frying the dried sardines and then adding a mixture of soy sauce, sugar, mirin, and roasted white sesame seeds.

== Gallery ==
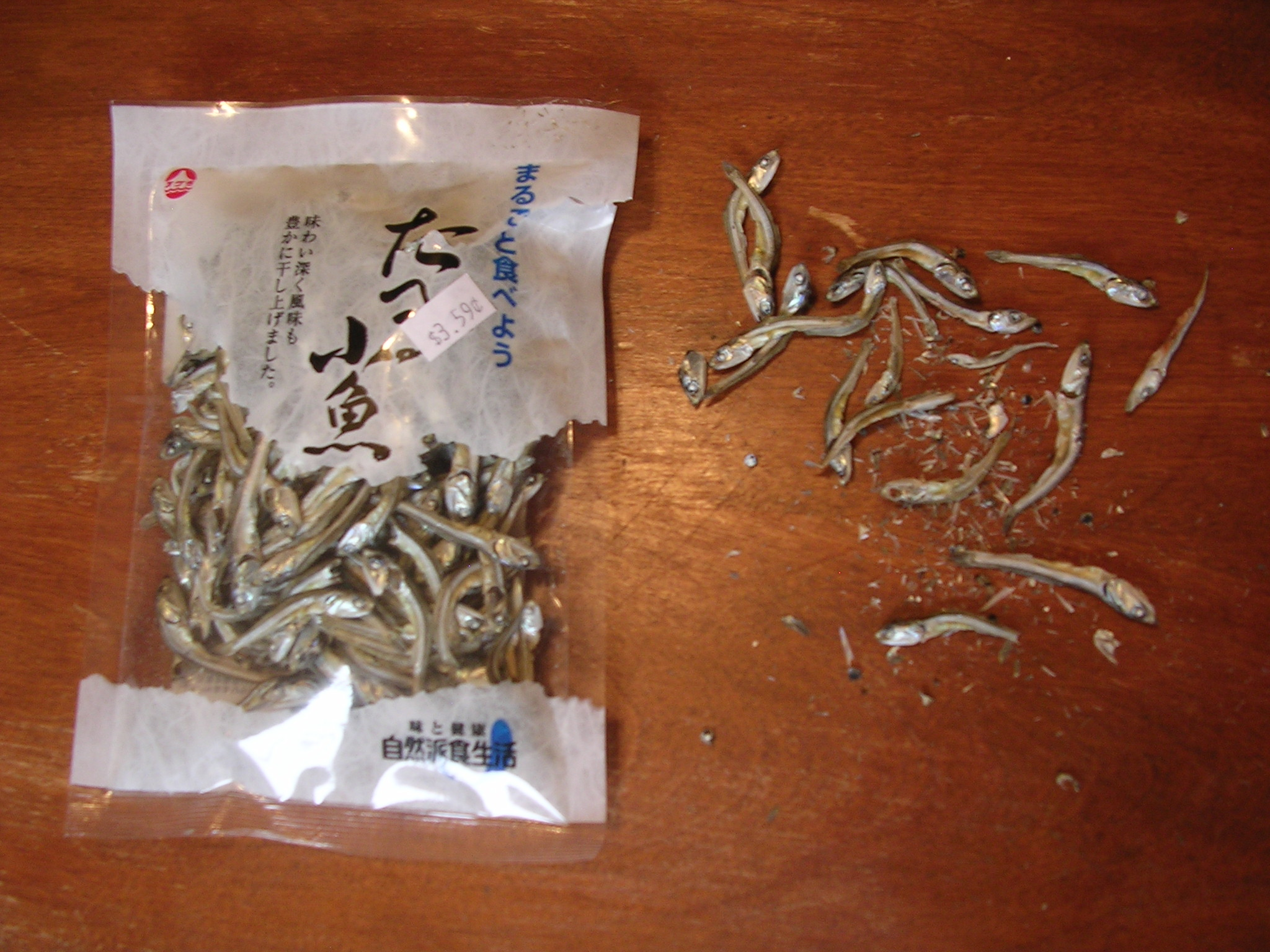

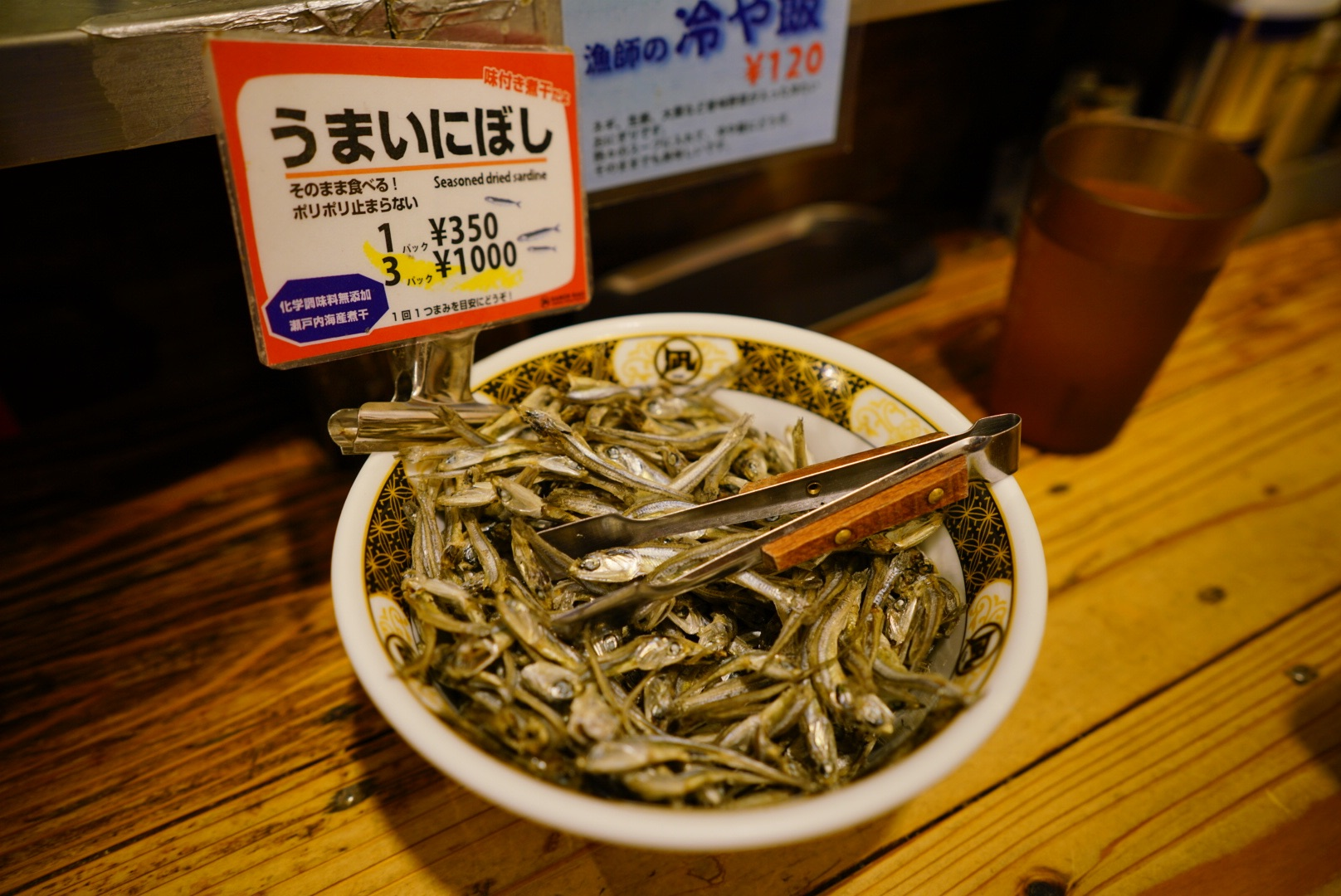

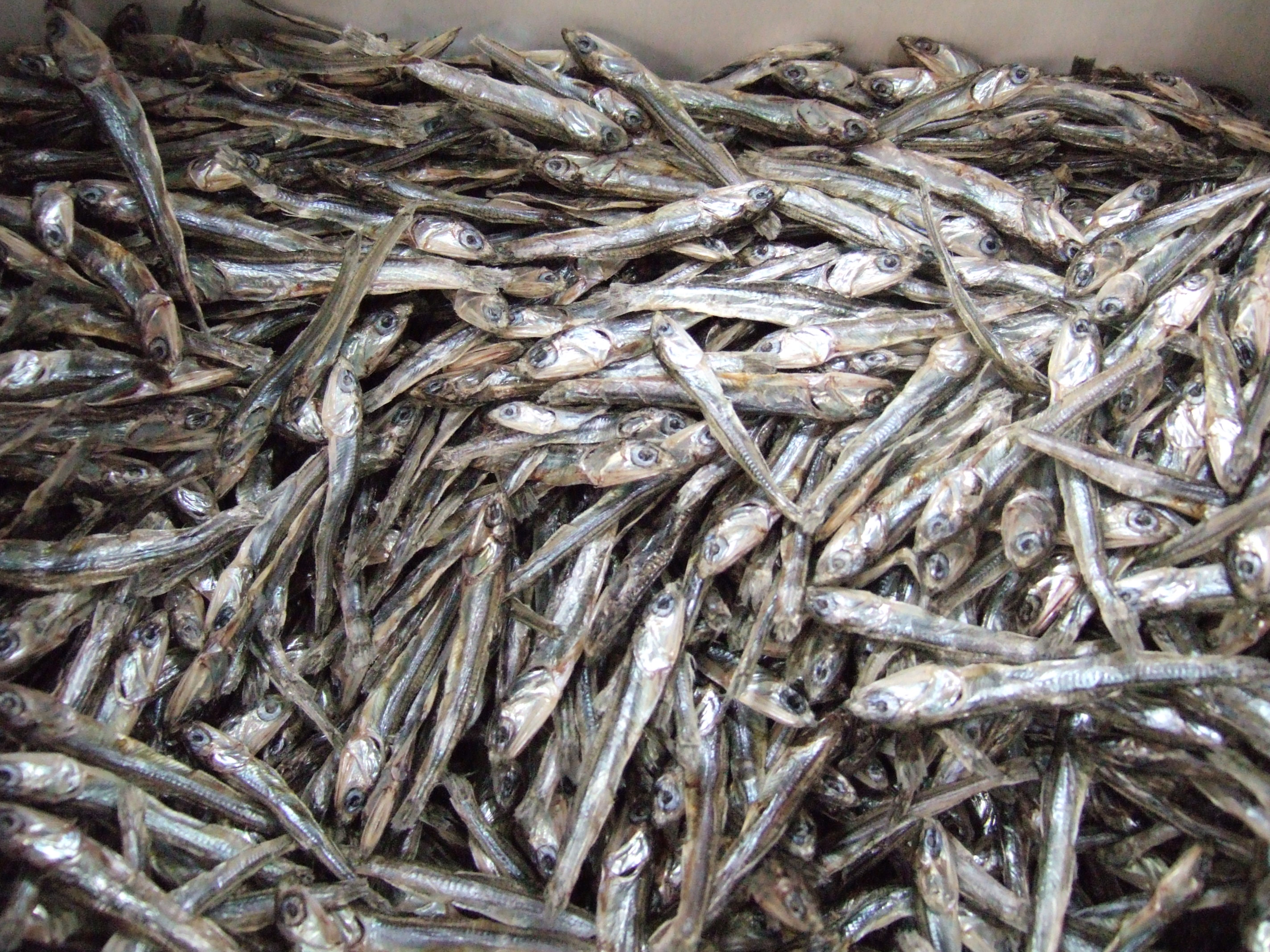
Tazukuri, dried and candied Japanese anchovy

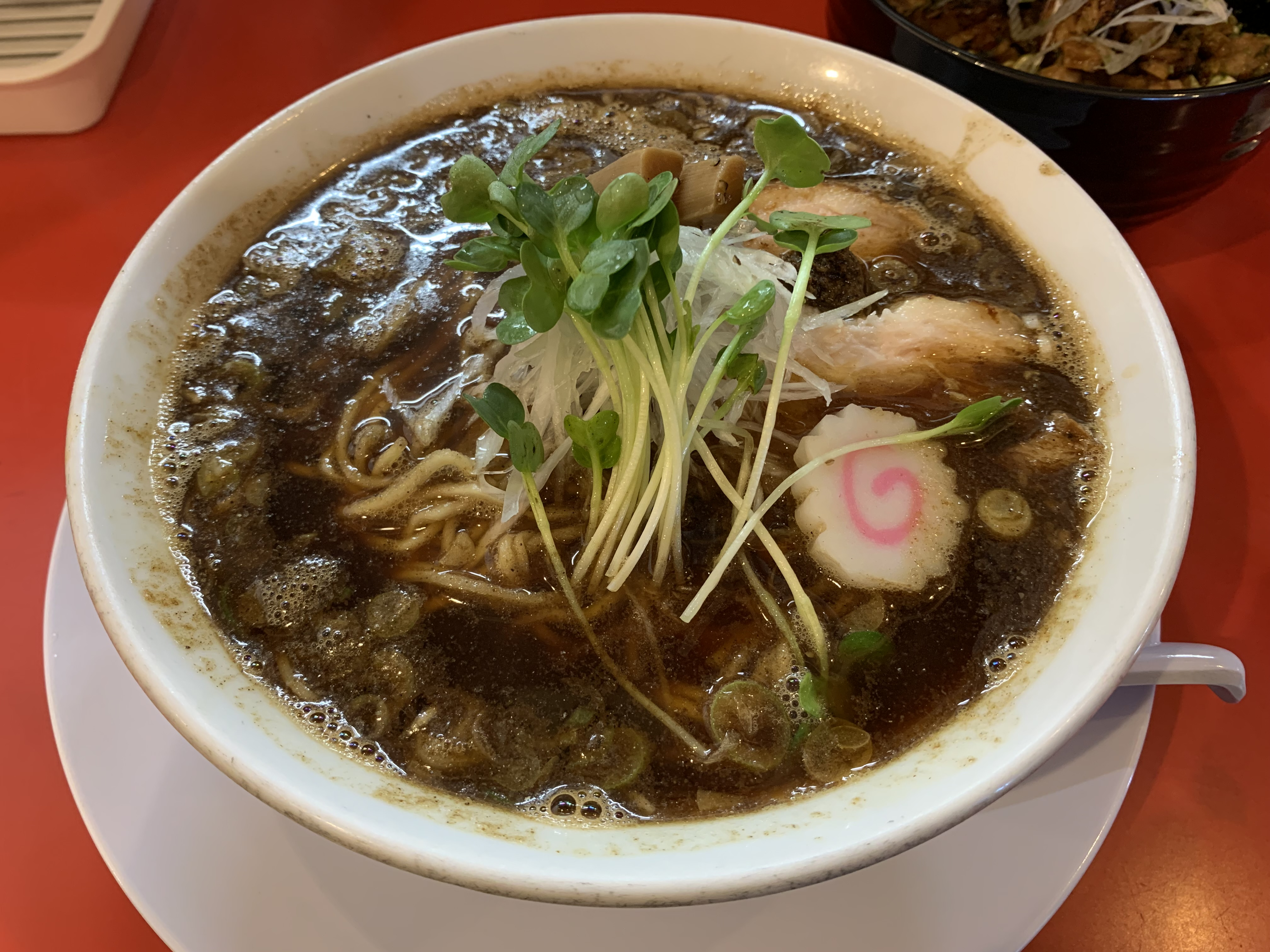
Ramen made with niboshi stock

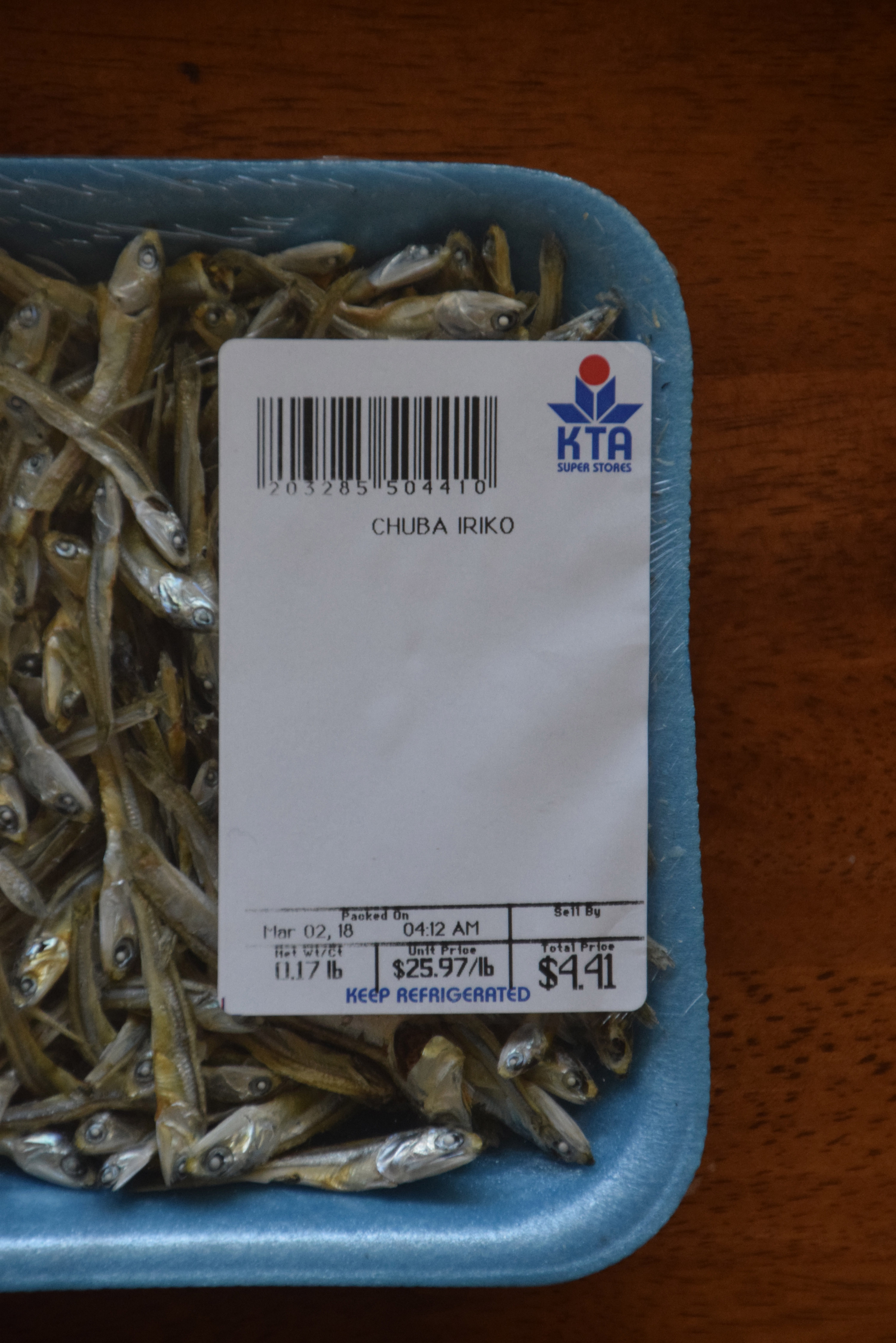
Called iriko in Hawaii, where Japanese immigrants were mostly from Western Japan

== See also ==
- Japanese cuisine
- Sardine
- Anchovy
