= Inago no tsukudani =

Japanese dish

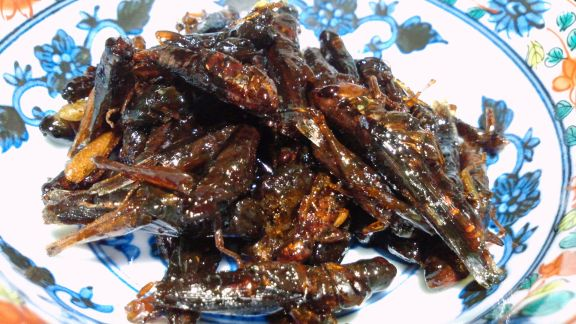

Inago no tsukudani (いなごの佃煮) is a Japanese dish featuring rice grasshoppers that are boiled in soy sauce and sugar. Inago is the Japanese word for locust. The locusts are prepared in the "tsukudani" style of cooking (boiled in soy sauce and sugar). The dish is traditional in Japan's inland and mountain regions, including Nagano and Fukushima, where it once served as an important nutritional supplement.

== Background ==
Locusts have been regarded as natural enemies of agricultural crops since ancient times because of their ability to swarm, which can lead to plagues. There is no way of avoiding this phenomenon other than decreasing the number of locusts before they swarm. People suffered from locust plagues because the locusts left them with nothing to eat after they swarmed; thus, people started to eat them. Because they contain a large amount of protein, they can be a rich source of energy.

== Preparation ==
Before cooking, the locusts are placed into a box or bag without food for one night to remove the feces from their bodies.

The locusts are added to boiling water and drained. They are cooked in a hot frying pan without oil and stirred to remove all traces of water from their bodies. Oil is added, and they are stir-fried to be crispy.
