= Chueo-tang =

Korean pond loach soup

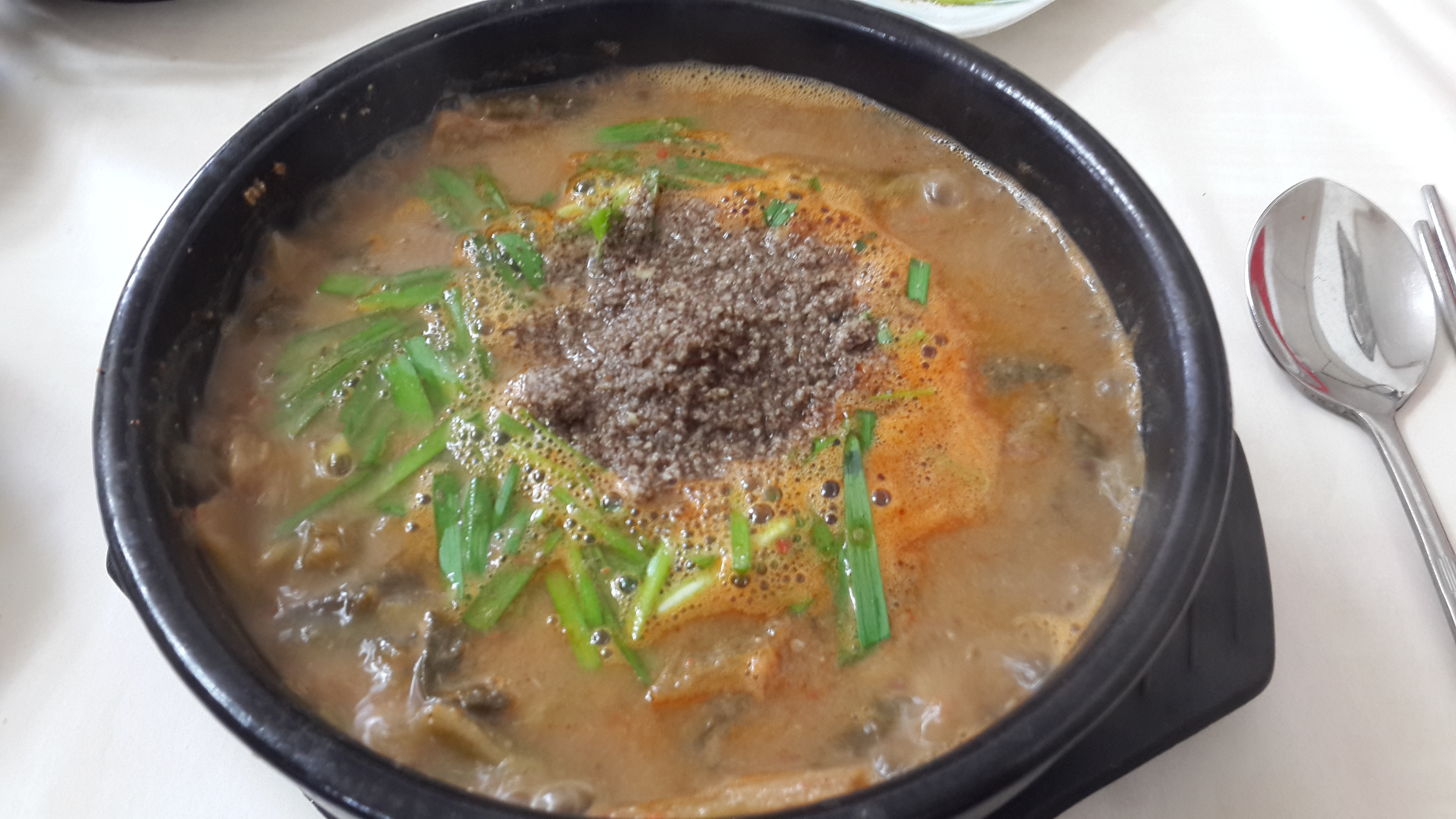
- Chueo-tang served with perilla seed powder
- Alternative names: Loach soup
- Type: Tang
- Place of origin: Korea
- Associated cuisine: Korean cuisine
- Main ingredients: Pond loach

Korean name
- Hangul: 추어탕
- Hanja: 鰍魚湯
- RR: chueotang
- MR: ch'uŏt'ang
- IPA: tɕʰu.ʌ.tʰaŋ

Chueo-tang (Korean: 추어탕) or loach soup is a Korean tang (soup) that prominently features pond loach, a freshwater fish. The city of Namwon in southwestern South Korea is known for its version of the dish.

== Etymology ==
Chueo (추어; 鰍魚) is a nickname for pond loach, called mikkuraji (미꾸라지) in Korean. Tang (탕; 湯) means soup.

== History and tradition ==
As irrigated rice paddies are drained after chubun (autumnal equinox), chubby pond loaches, ready for hibernation, are easily caught in the ditches dug around paddy fields. Chueo-tang (추어탕) is often a featured dish in banquets for the elderly.

In Hanyang (now Seoul) during the Joseon era, the guild of licensed panhandlers mandated that its members beg only for bap (cooked rice), not banchan (side dishes) or guk (soup). (The practice was intended to maintain dignity and differentiate members from unlicensed beggars.) As an accompaniment to the rice, Panhandlers hunted pond loaches and made chueo-tang. They were also granted the exclusive rights to sell chueo-tang in the city.

The third-oldest operating restaurant in Seoul, Yonggeumok, specializes in the Seoul style of the dish. In the Seoul style, the fish are served whole, and the soup base uses chili pepper flakes instead of gochujang.

== Preparation ==
Pond loaches are boiled in water until very tender, and sieved to remove bones and skins. The sieved flesh along with beef or chicken broth is then boiled again and seasoned with gochujang (chili paste), doenjang (soybean paste), grated ginger, and ground black pepper. Vegetable ingredients include mung bean sprouts, Asian royal fern, scallions, napa cabbages, and mustard greens. The soup is often served with ground chopi peppercorns, along with Korean mint leaves (in Yeongnam region) or perilla powder (in Honam region).

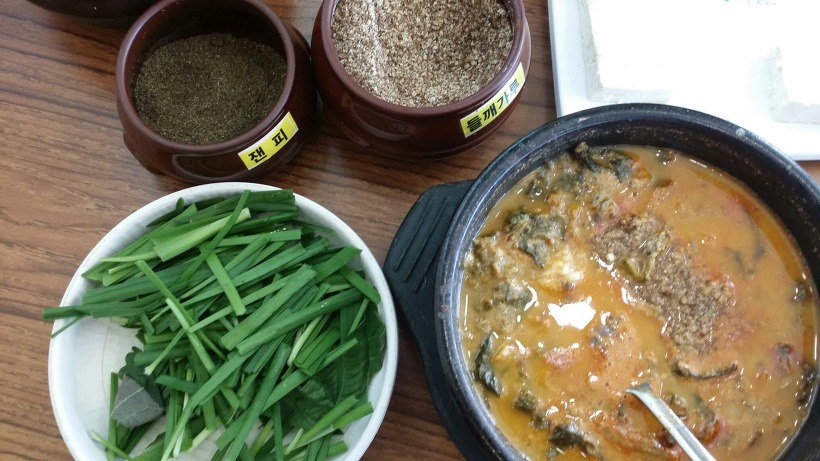
Chueo-tang served with ground chopi, ground perilla seeds, and garlic chives

== See also ==
- Dojō nabe, Japanese pond loach stew
- List of soups
