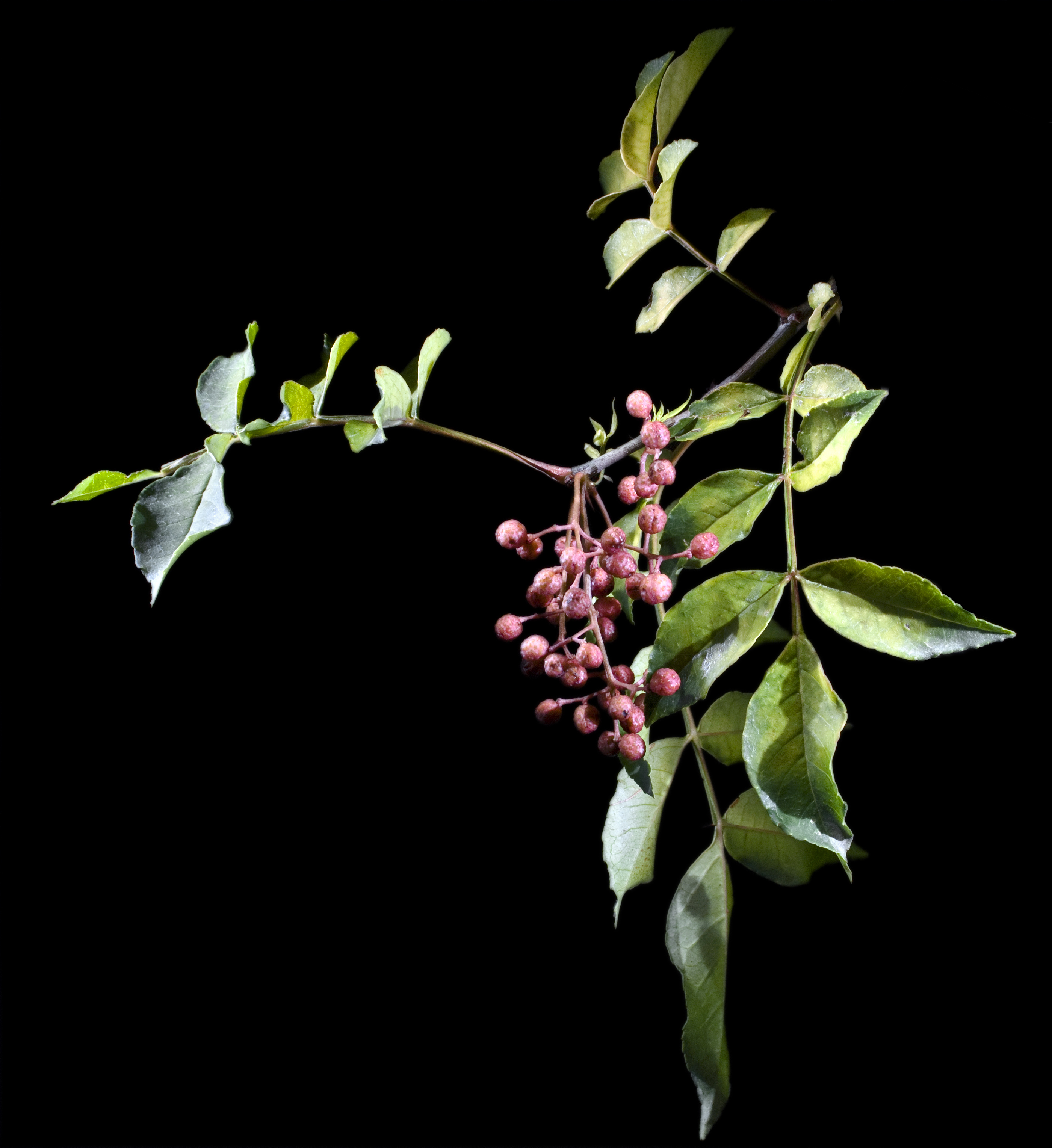

Scientific classification
- Kingdom: Plantae
- Clade: Tracheophytes
- Clade: Angiosperms
- Clade: Eudicots
- Clade: Rosids
- Order: Sapindales
- Family: Rutaceae
- Genus: Zanthoxylum
- Species: Z. piperitum

Binomial name
- Zanthoxylum piperitum (L.) DC
- It is native to Japan and Korea

= Zanthoxylum piperitum =

Species of plant

Zanthoxylum piperitum, also known as Japanese pepper or Japanese prickly-ash, is a spiny, aromatic, deciduous species of shrub or tree in the family Rutaceae native to Japan and Korea. It is known as sanshō (山椒) in Japan and chopi (초피) in Korea. Both the leaves and fruits (peppercorns) are used as aromatics and flavorings in these countries. It is closely related to the Chinese Sichuan pepper, which comes from plants of the same genus.

== Description ==
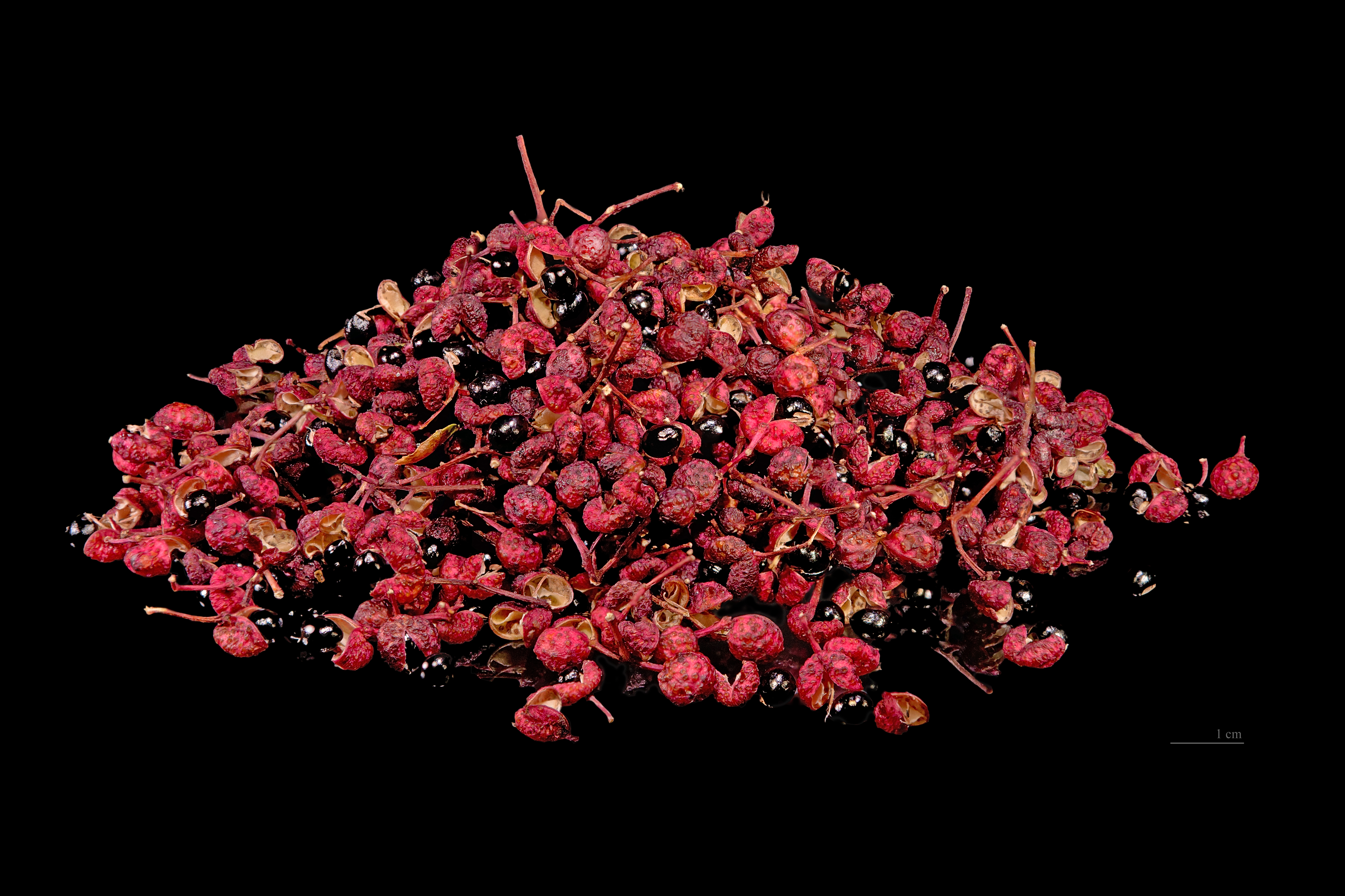
Fruit and seeds

=== Vegetative characteristics ===
Zanthoxylum piperitum is a spiny, aromatic, deciduous shrub or tree. The branch grows pairs of sharp thorns and has odd-epinnately compound leaves, alternately arranged, with 5~9 pairs of ovate leaflets having crenate (slightly serrated) margins.

=== Generative characteristics ===
The tree blooms in April to May, forming axillary flower clusters, about 5 mm, and yellow-green in color. It is dioecious, and the flowers of the male plant can be consumed as hana-sanshō, while the female flowers yield berries or peppercorns of about 5 mm. In autumn, these berries ripen, turning scarlet and burst, scattering the black seeds within.

=== Phytochemistry ===
Chemical analysis has revealed that the seeds contain remarkably high concentrations of sugar-modified derivatives (glucosides) of N-methylserotonin and N,N-dimethylserotonin, also known as bufotenin.

== Taxonomy ==
It was first described as Fagara piperita L. by Carl Linnaeus in 1759. It was moved to the genus Zanthoxylum L. as Zanthoxylum piperitum (L.) DC. by Augustin Pyramus de Candolle in 1824.

== Distribution and habitat ==
Its natural range spans from Hokkaido to Kyushu in Japan, southern parts of the Korean Peninsula, and mainland China.

== Ecology ==
It is a host plant for the Japanese indigenous swallowtail butterfly species, the citrus butterfly Papilio xuthus, which has also spread to Hawaii.

== Cultivation ==
In Japan, Wakayama Prefecture boasts 80% of domestic production. Aridagawa, Wakayama, produces a specialty variety called budō sanshō ('grape sansho'), which bears large fruits and clusters, rather like a bunch of grapes. The thornless variety, Asakura sansho, derives its name from its place of origin, the Asakura district in the now defunct Yokacho, integrated into Yabu, Hyōgo.

== Common names ==
"Japanese pepper" Z. piperitum is called sanshō (山椒; 'mountain pepper') in Japan, but the corresponding cognate term in Korean, sancho (산초) refers to a different species: Z. schinifolium, (Note: Korea National Arboretum's entry here is "산초 나무 sancho namu", with 나무 meaning "tree, wood".) known as inuzanshō or 'dog sansho' in Japan.

In Korea, Z. piperitum is called chopi (초피). (Note: Again, the Korea National Arboretum's entry here is "초피 나무 sancho namu", with 나무 meaning "tree".) However, in several regional dialects, notably Gyeongsang dialect, it is also called sancho (산초) or jepi (제피).

"Japanese prickly-ash" has been used as the standard American common name.

== Uses ==
=== Japanese cuisine ===
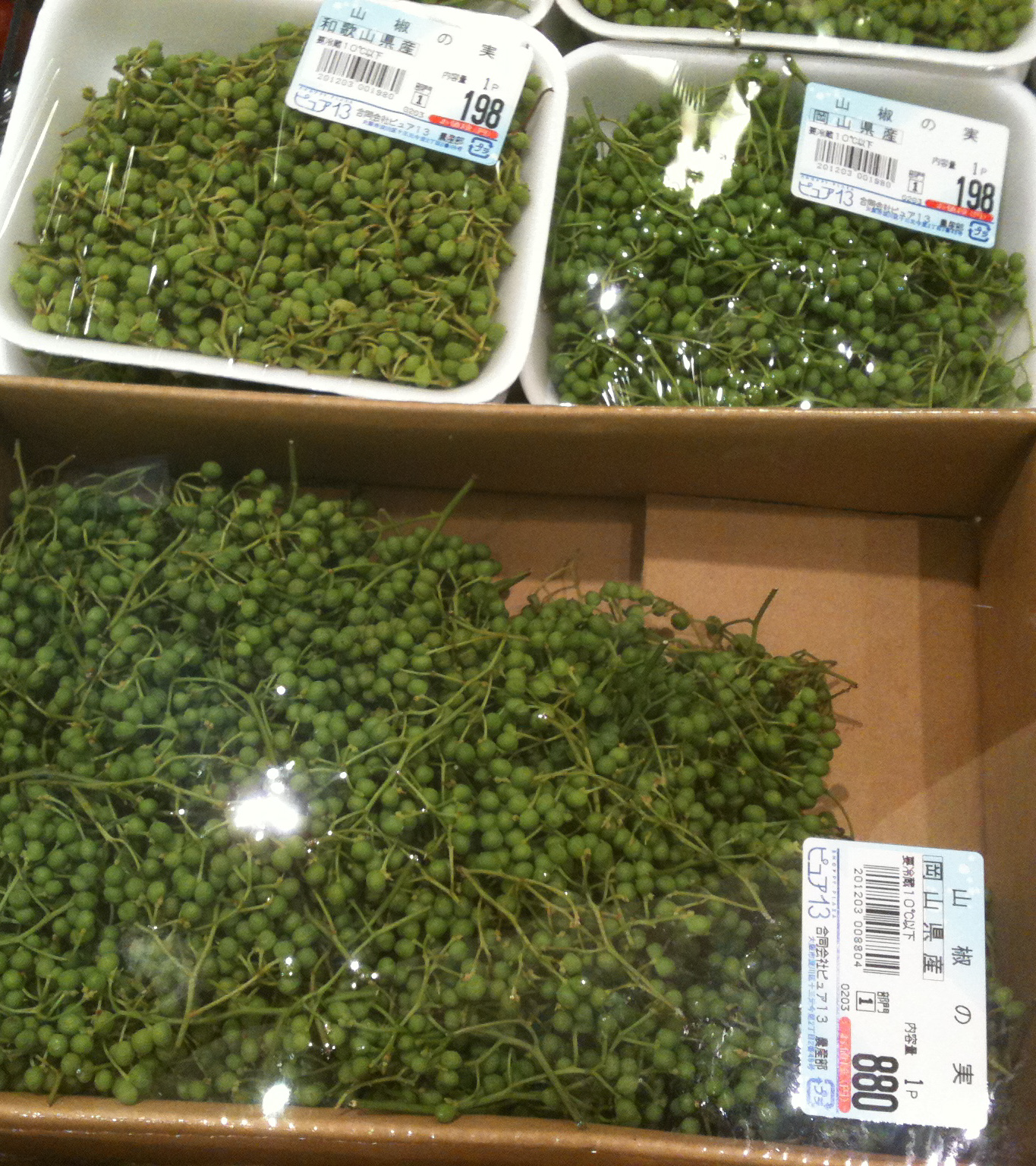
Fresh green Japanese pepper in a supermarket in Japan

The pulverized mature fruits ("peppercorns" or "berries") known as "Japanese pepper" or kona-zanshō (粉ざんしょう) are the standard spice for sprinkling on kabayaki-unagi (broiled eel). It is also one of the seven main ingredients of the blended spice called shichimi, which also contains red chili peppers. Finely ground Japanese pepper, kona-zanshō, is nowadays usually sold in sealed packets, and individual serving sizes are included inside heat-and-serve broiled eel packages.

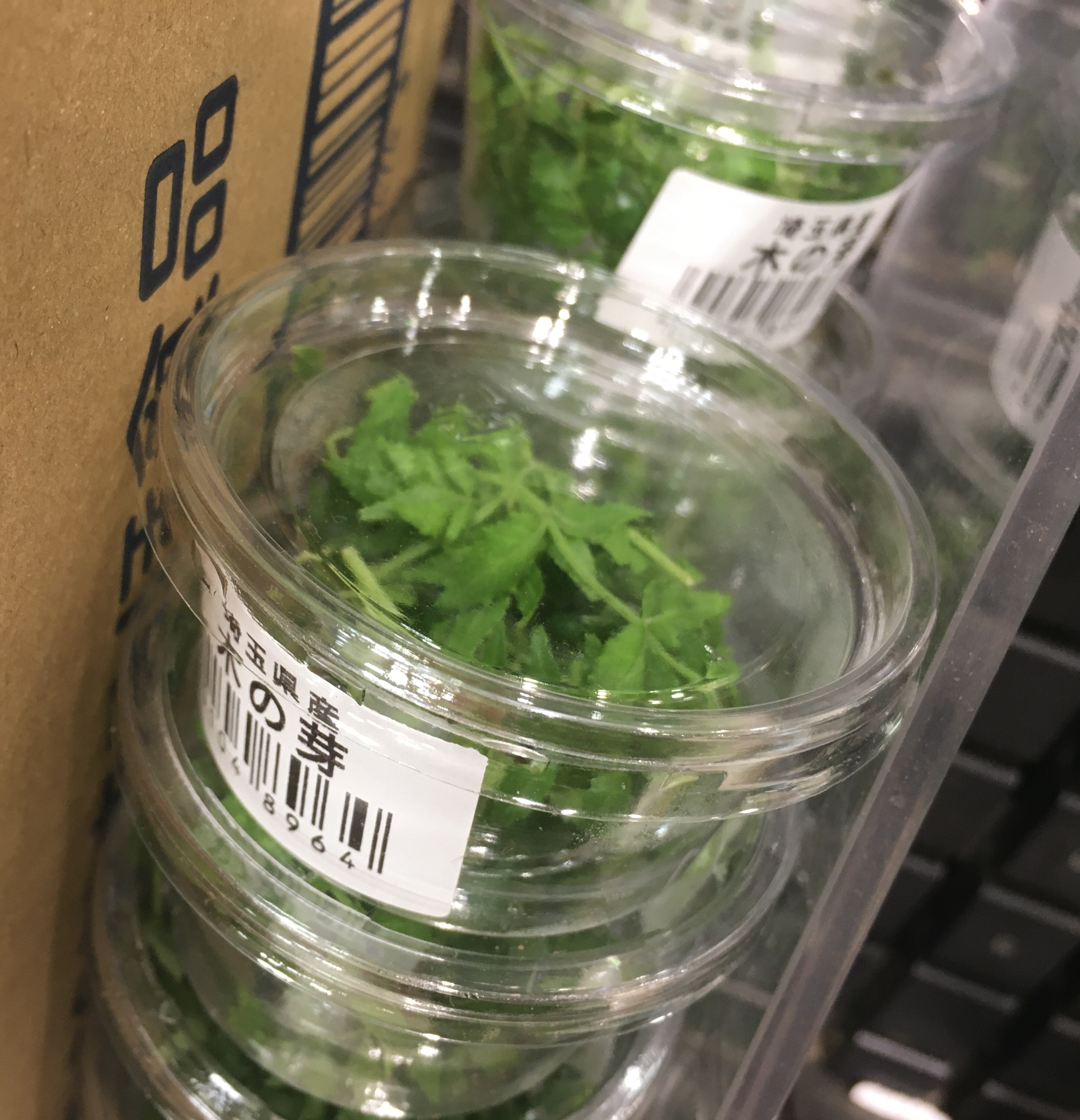
Young leaves for sale in Tokyo

Young leaves and shoots, pronounced ki-no-mé or ko-no-mé (木の芽, lit. 'tree bud') herald the spring season, and often garnish grilled fish and soups. They have a distinctive flavor which is not to the liking of everyone. It is a customary ritual to put a leaf between cupped hands, and clap the hands with a popping sound, this supposedly serving to bring out the aroma. The young leaves are crushed and blended with miso using suribachi (mortar) to make a paste, a pesto sauce of sorts, and then used to make various aemono (tossed salad). The stereotypical main ingredient for the resultant kinome-ae is the fresh harvest of bamboo shoots, but the sauce may be tossed (or delicately "folded") into sashimi, clams, squid or other vegetable such as tara-no-me (angelica-tree shoots).

The immature green berries are called ao-zanshō (lit. 'green sansho'), and these may be blanched and salted, or simmered using soy sauce into dark-brown tsukudani, which is eaten as a condiment. The berries are also available as shoyu-zuke, which is just steeped in soy sauce. The berries are also cooked with small fry fish and flavored with soy sauce (chirimen jako), a specialty item of Kyoto, since its Mount Kurama outskirts is a renowned growing area of the plant.

There is also a dessert named kirisanshō, rice cake dessert flavored with ground Japanese pepper. It is a specialty in the north.

In central and northeastern Japan, there is also a non-sticky rice-cake type confection called goheimochi, which is basted with miso-based paste and grilled, sometimes using the Japanese pepper as flavor additive to the miso. Also being marketed are sansho flavored arare (rice crackers), snack foods, and sweet sansho-mochi.

=== Korean cuisine ===
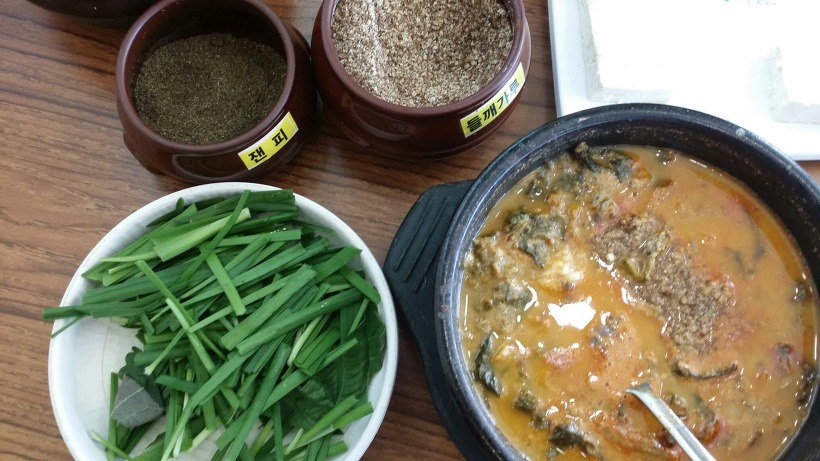
Chueo-tang (loach soup) served with chopi powder, perilla powder, and garlic chives

Both the plant itself and its fruit (or peppercorn), known as chopi (초피), are called by many names including jepi (제피), jenpi (젠피), jipi (지피), and jopi (조피) in different dialects used in southern parts of Korea, where the plant is extensively cultivated and consumed.

Before the introduction of chili peppers from the New World which led to the creation of the chili paste gochujang, the Koreans used a jang paste spiced with chopi and black peppers.

In Southern Korean cuisine, dried and ground chopi fruit is used as a condiment served with varieties of food, such as chueo-tang (loach soup), maeun-tang (spicy fish stew), and hoe (raw fish).

Young leaves of the plant, called chopi-sun (초피순), are used as a culinary herb or a namul vegetable in Southern Korean cuisine. The leaves are also eaten pickled as jangajji, pan-fried to make buchimgae (pancake), or deep-fried as fritters such as twigak and bugak. Sometimes, chopi leaves are added to anchovy-salt mixture to make herbed fish sauce, called chopi-aekjeot.

=== Craftwork ===
In Japan, the thick wood of the tree is traditionally made into a gnarled and rough-hewn wooden pestle (surikogi), to use with suribachi. While sansho wood surikogi are less common today, they impart subtle flavor to foods ground with them.

=== Folk medicine ===
Japan

In Japanese pharmaceuticals, the mature husks with seeds removed are considered the crude medicine form of sanshō. It is an ingredient in bitter tincture, and the toso wine served ceremonially. The pungent taste derives from sanshool and sanshoamide. It also contains aromatic oils geraniol, dipentene, citral, etc.

== See also ==
- Sichuan pepper
- Z. beecheyanum – iwa-zanshō, hire-zanshō; Okinawan dialect: sensuru-gii
- Z. schinifolium – inu-zanshō
- Z. armatum var. subtrifoliatum – fuyuzanshō
