= Shichimi =

Japanese spice mix

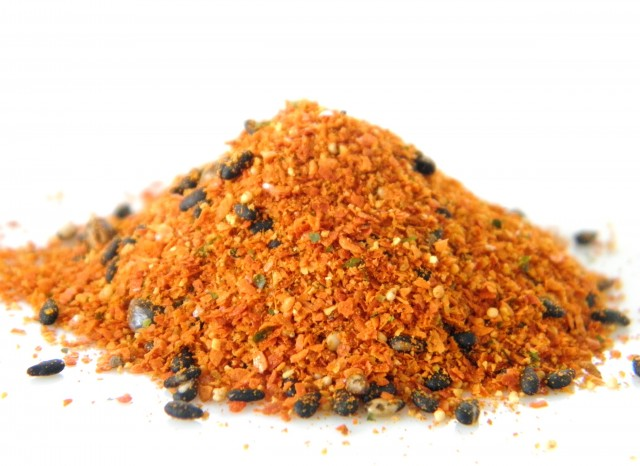
- Shichimi tōgarashi
- Alternative names: Nana-iro tōgarashi
- Type: Spice mixture
- Place of origin: Japan
- Invented: 17th century

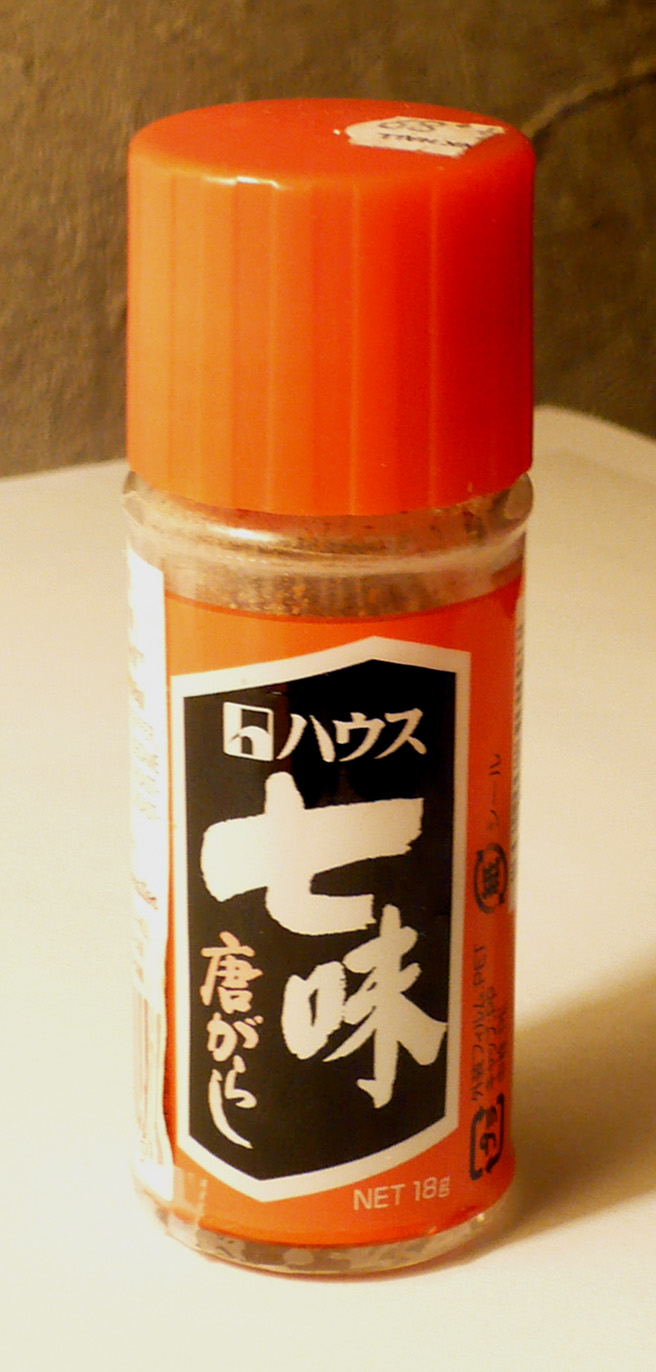
A jar of commercially produced shichimi

Shichi-mi tōgarashi (七味唐辛子; seven-flavor chili pepper), also known as nana-iro tōgarashi (七色唐辛子; seven-color chili pepper) or simply shichimi, is a common Japanese spice mixture containing seven ingredients. Tōgarashi is the Japanese name for Capsicum annuum peppers, and it is this ingredient that makes shichimi spicy.

== Etymology ==
"Shichi" means seven, "mi" means flavor, and "togarashi" is the red chili pepper Capsicum annuum. The blend is also called nanami togarashi.

In the United States and elsewhere, shichimi is sometimes referred to as "nanami" (togarashi). Both names translate to "seven flavors," but "nanami" is often used in branding for ease of pronunciation among English speakers. While "shichi" and "nana" are two pronunciations of the same character (七) and both mean "seven" in Japanese, "nana" has a more familiar sound in English, leading to the alternative name. While nanami is sometimes described as emphasising a greater citrus flavour than shichimi, the spice mixtures are substantively the same in taste and ingredients.

== Ingredients ==
A typical blend may contain:

- coarsely ground red chili pepper (the main ingredient)
- ground sanshō ("Japanese pepper")
- roasted orange peel (chenpi)
- black or white sesame seed
- hemp seed
- ground ginger
- nori or aonori (seaweed)
- poppy seed
- yuzu peel

Some recipes may substitute or supplement these with rapeseed or shiso. Shichimi is distinguished from ichi-mi tōgarashi (一味唐辛子; ichimi, one-flavor chili pepper), which is simply ground red chili pepper.

== Use ==
The blend is traditionally used as a finishing spice. It is ubiquitous in restaurants in Japan; a shaker is sometimes on every table along with salt and pepper shakers and bottles of soy sauce. It is often consumed with soups and on noodles and gyūdon. Some rice products, such as rice cakes, agemochi and roasted rice crackers, also use it for seasoning.

== History ==
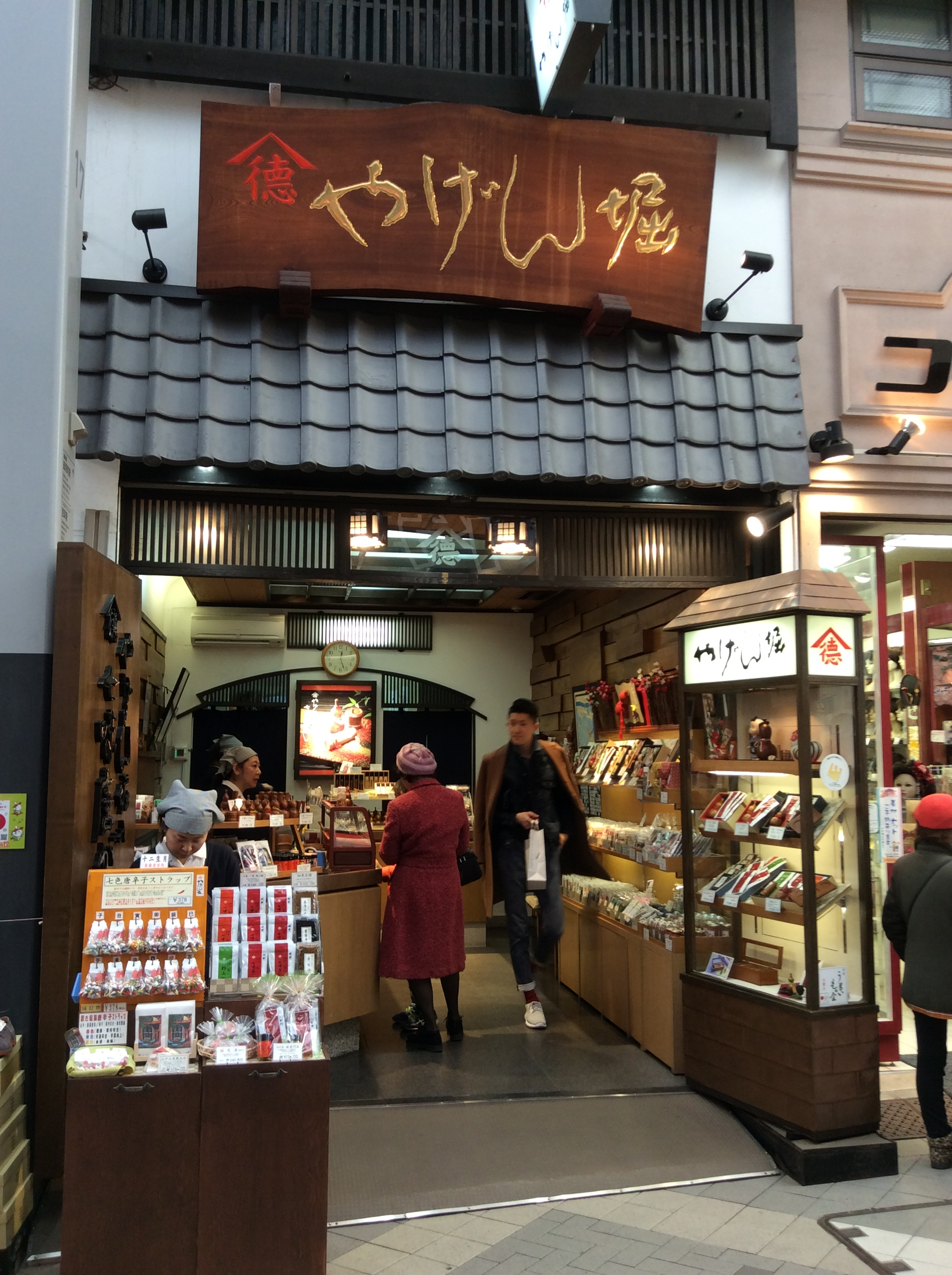
Yagenbori Shichimi Togarashi Shin-Nakamise Head Store (Asakusa, Tokyo)

Shichimi dates back at least to the 17th century, when it was produced by herb dealers in Edo, current day Tokyo, and sometimes it is referred to as Yagenbori (薬研堀; from the name of the original place of production). Today, most shichimi sold come from one of three kinds, all sold near temples: Yagenbori (やげん堀) sold near Sensō-ji, Shichimiya (七味家) sold near Kiyomizu-dera, and Yawataya Isogorō (八幡屋磯五郎) sold near Zenkō-ji.

== Culture ==
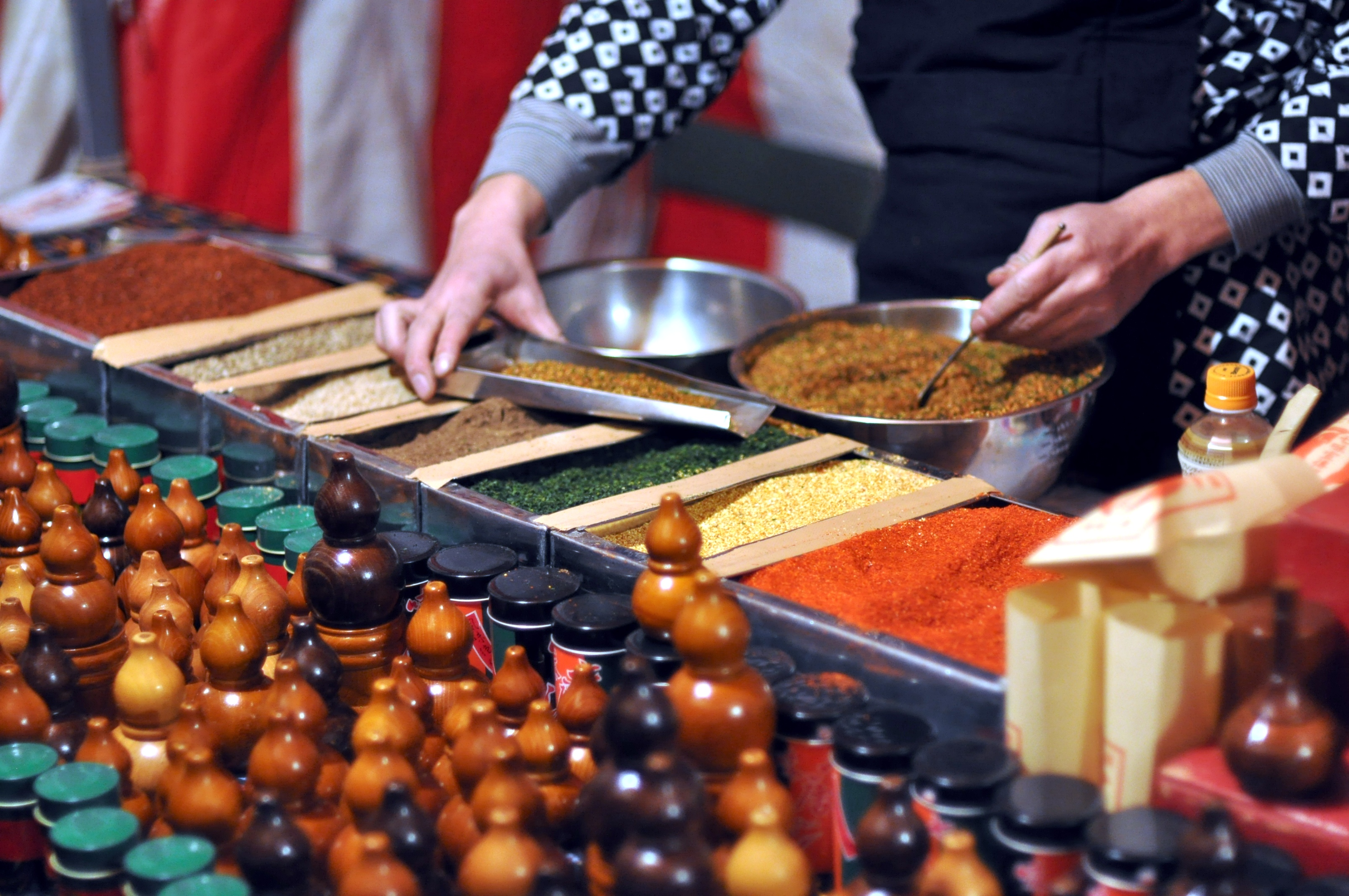
This is a performance of mixing spices while explaining their benefits.

In modern times, the product is generally sold as a formulated product, but in the past it was prepared and sold according to the customer's needs (七味唐辛子売り). Even today, performances (custom blending demonstrations) can be seen at festival stalls.

== See also ==
- List of condiments
