= Tsukudani =

Simmered Japanese side dish

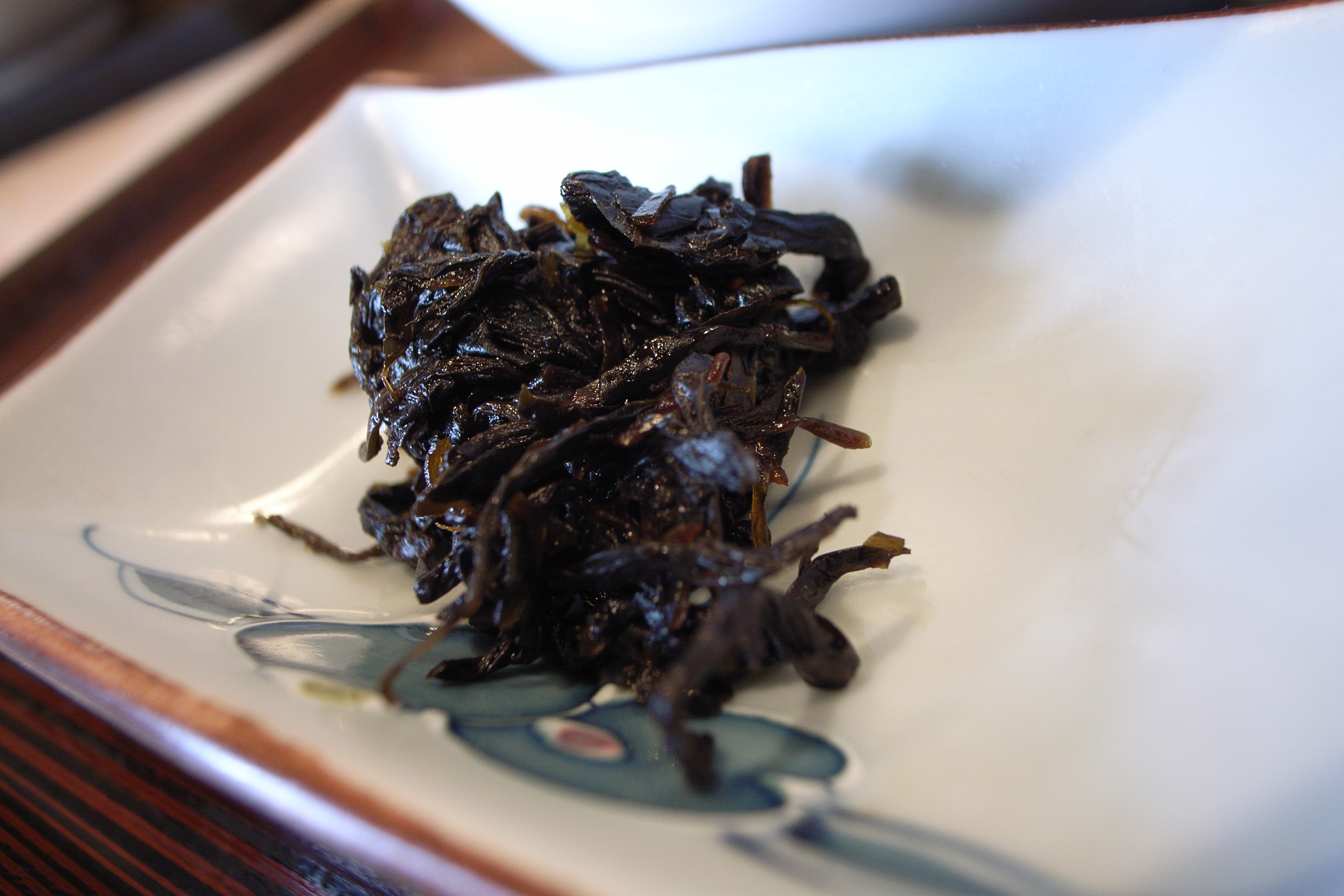
A dish of tsukudani made from kombu seaweed

Tsukudani (佃煮) is thinly sliced seafood, meat or seaweed that has been simmered in soy sauce and mirin. As a flavorful accompaniment to plain rice, tsukudani is made salty enough to not go bad, allowing high osmotic pressure to preserve the ingredients from microbial spoilage similarly to other types of pickles. Its name originates from Tsukudajima, the island (in present-day Chūō, Tokyo) where it was first made in the Edo period. Many kinds of tsukudani are sold, and common ingredients include kelp, short-neck clam, young lancefish, and nori. Traditionally made tsukudani is preservable and has been favored as a storable side dish in Japanese kitchens since the Edo period.

Tsukudani can be made with kombu or wakame seaweeds, and is often made to reuse ingredients from making dashi that would otherwise be discarded. It is usually eaten with cooked rice as a flavoring agent, since the flavor is very intense (approximately 1 tbsp for one bowl of rice). Finished tsukudani is served chilled from the refrigerator, where it takes on a gelatinous texture.

== Local variations ==
- Wakasagi no Tsukudani (わかさぎの佃煮), made with little pond smelt caught in the Lake Hachirogata– Akita Prefecture
- Asari no Tsukudani (あさりの佃煮), made with little neck clam – Chiba Prefecture
- Ikanago no Kugini (いかなごのくぎ煮), made with sand lance – Hyōgo Prefecture
- Inago no Tsukudani (いなごの佃煮), made with locusts – Fukushima Prefecture and Nagano Prefecture
- Zazamushi no Tsukudani (ざざむしの佃煮), made with stonefly and caddisfly larvae – Ina, Nagano

== See also ==
- Laverbread – Food made from edible seaweed
- Nori
- Wakame
