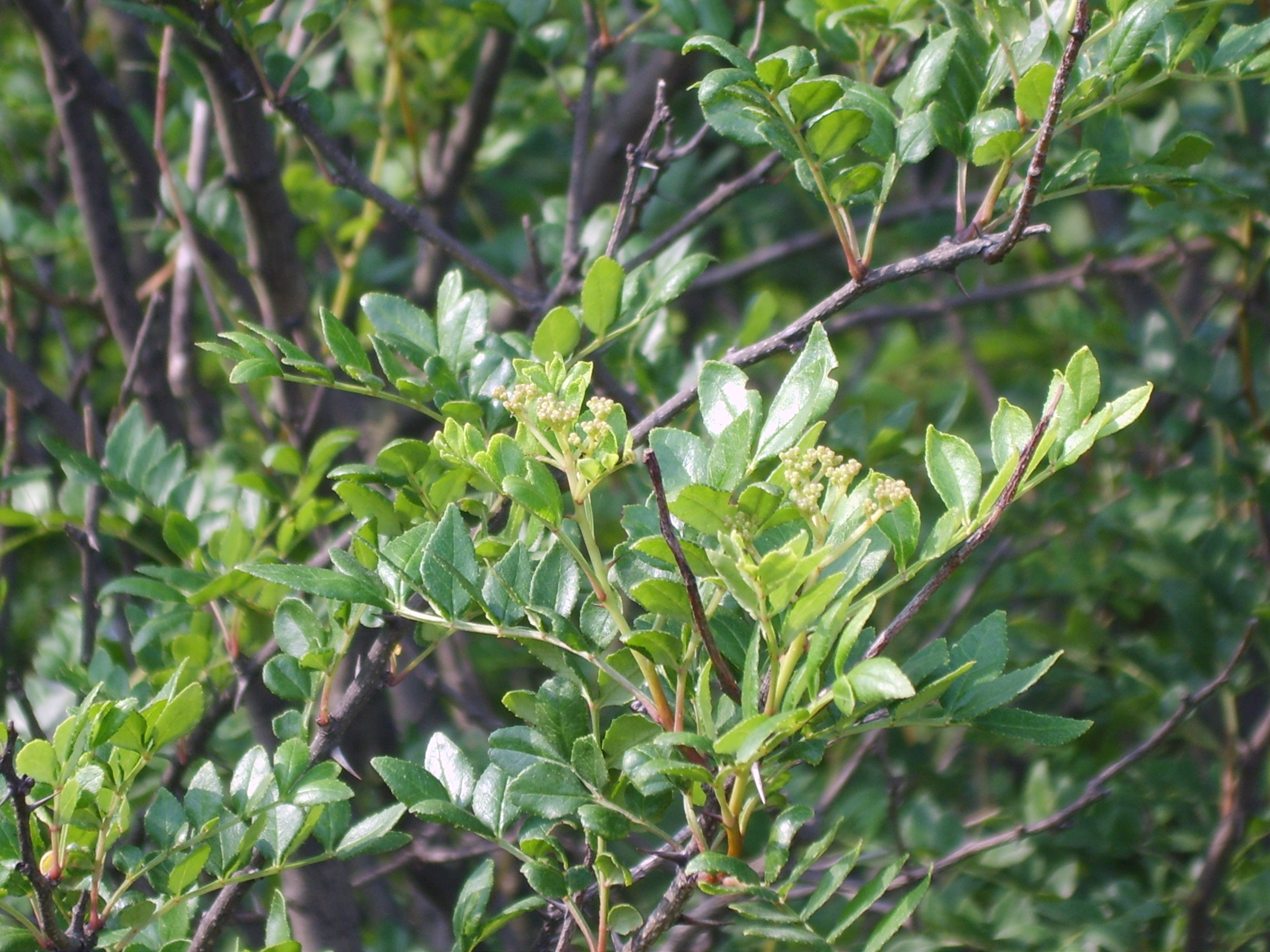

Scientific classification
- Kingdom: Plantae
- Clade: Tracheophytes
- Clade: Angiosperms
- Clade: Eudicots
- Clade: Rosids
- Order: Sapindales
- Family: Rutaceae
- Genus: Zanthoxylum
- Species: Z. schinifolium

Binomial name
- Zanthoxylum schinifolium Siebold & Zucc.

Synonyms
- Fagara mantchurica (Benn.) Honda; Fagara pteropoda (Hayata) Y.C. Liu; Fagara schinifolia (Siebold & Zucc.) Engl. nom. illeg.; Zanthoxylum mantschuricum Benn.; Zanthoxylum pteropodum Hayata

= Zanthoxylum schinifolium =

Species of flowering plant

Zanthoxylum schinifolium, also called mastic-leaf prickly ash, is a species of flowering plant in the Rutaceae, the citrus family.

It was first described and published in Abh. Math.-Phys. Cl. Königl. Bayer. Akad. Wiss. vol.4 (Issue 2) on page 137 in 1845 by botanists Philipp Franz von Siebold and Joseph Gerhard Zuccarini.

It is native to central and eastern China, as well as temperate eastern Asia, which includes Japan, Korea, Manchuria, Ryukyu Islands and Taiwan. It is a shrub that grows primarily in the temperate biome regions.

There are two accepted and known varieties:

- Zanthoxylum schinifolium var. okinawense (Nakai) Hatus. ex Simabuku
- Zanthoxylum schinifolium var. schinifolium

Its peppercorns are the source of the spice Sancho (spice) which is used in Korean cuisine.

It is called 青花椒 "green flower-pepper / green Sichuan pepper" in China. It is used in traditional medicine and cooking. It is an economically-important crop in Sichuan. Fungal pathogen species Pestalotiopsis kenyana is known to cause leaf spot disease on Zanthoxylum schinifolium in Sichuan Province, China.
