= C21H18NO4 =

The molecular formula C_{21}H_{18}NO_{4} (molar mass: 348.37 g/mol, exact mass: 348.1236 u) may refer to:

- Chelerythrine, an alkaloid
- Nitidine, an alkaloid
