= Toothache tree =

Toothache tree may refer to one of several American trees:

- Aralia spinosa (also called angelica tree, devil's walking stick, prickly ash)
- Zanthoxylum clava-herculis (also called pepperwood, Southern prickly ash) or Zanthoxylum americanum (Northern prickly ash).
