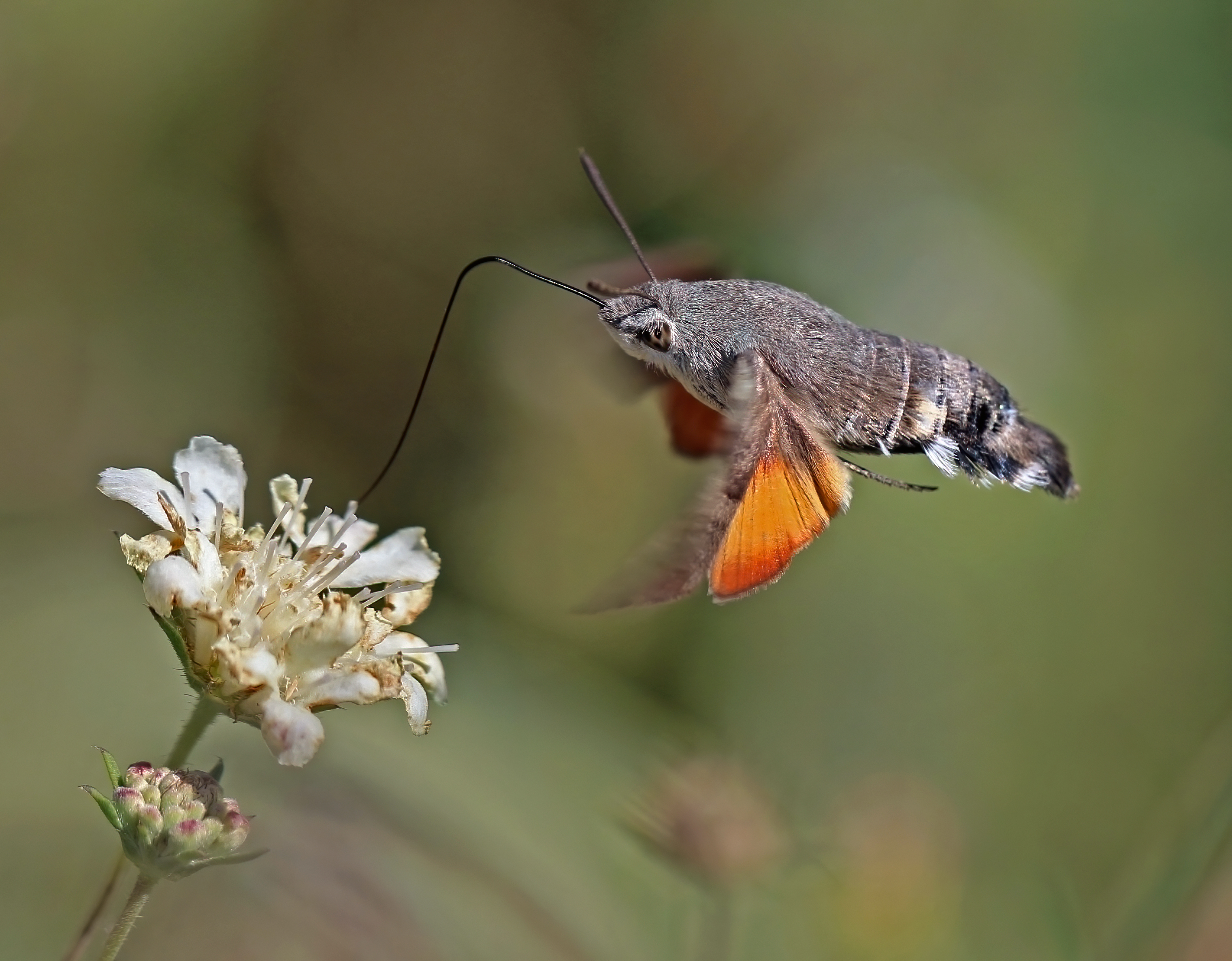
- In flight
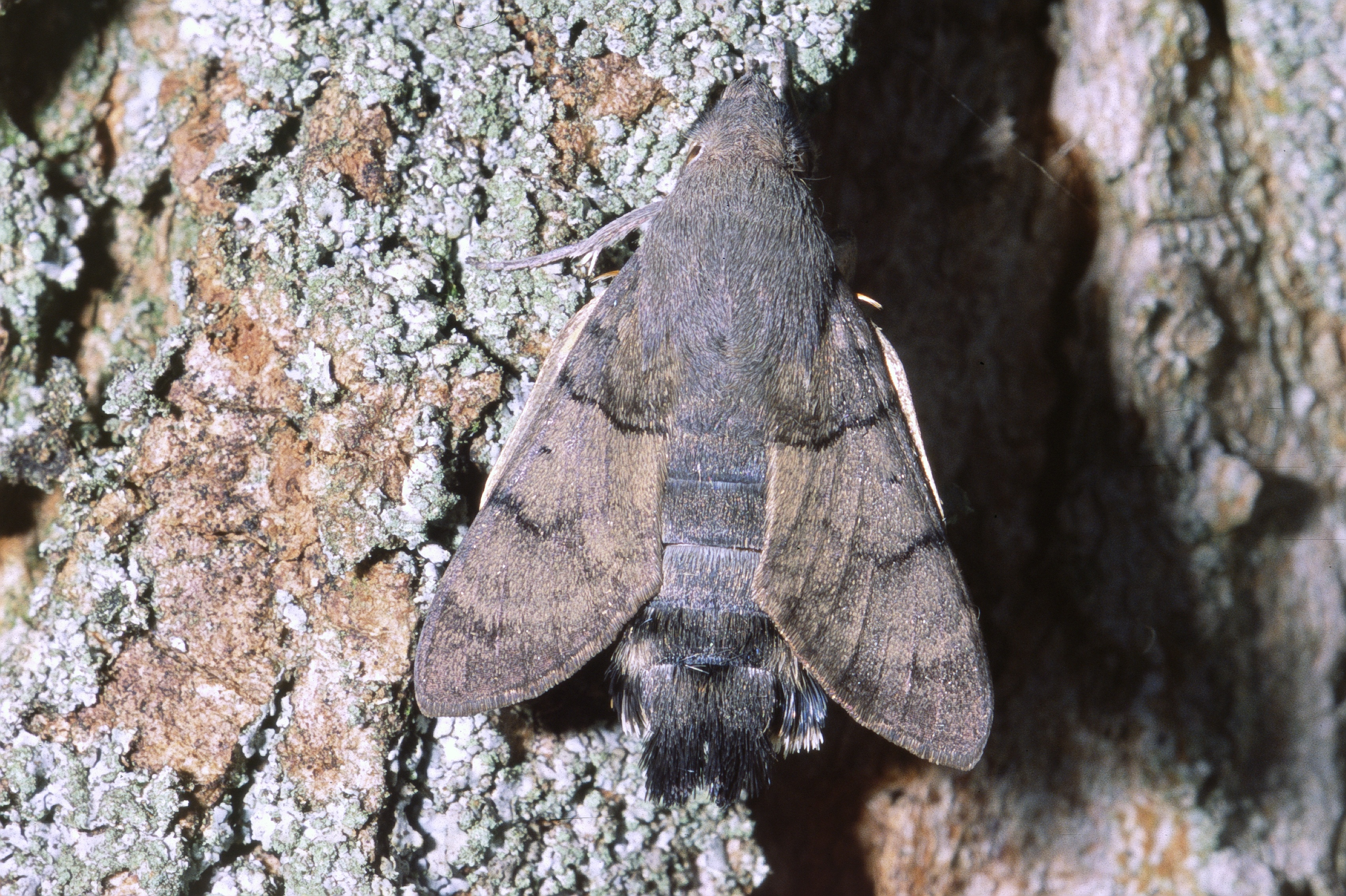
- At rest

Scientific classification
- Kingdom: Animalia
- Phylum: Arthropoda
- Clade: Pancrustacea
- Class: Insecta
- Order: Lepidoptera
- Family: Sphingidae
- Genus: Macroglossum
- Species: M. stellatarum

Binomial name
- Macroglossum stellatarum (Linnaeus, 1758)

Synonyms
- Sphinx stellatarum Linnaeus, 1758

= Hummingbird hawk-moth =

Species of moth

Distribution map: green for year round, yellow for the Northern Hemisphere's winter, blue for the Northern Hemisphere's summer

The hummingbird hawk-moth (Macroglossum stellatarum) is a species of hawk moth found across temperate regions of Eurasia. The species is named for its similarity to hummingbirds, as they feed on the nectar of tube-shaped flowers using their long proboscis while hovering in the air; this resemblance is an example of convergent evolution.

The hummingbird hawk-moth was first described by Carl Linnaeus in his 1758 10th edition of Systema Naturae. As of 2018, its mitogenome has been sequenced.

== Distribution ==
The hummingbird hawk-moth is distributed throughout the northern Old World from Portugal to Japan, but it breeds mainly in warmer climates (southern Europe, North Africa, and points east). Three generations are produced in a year in Spain. There is evidence that the population in Britain and Ireland is expanding its range, and numbers have been consistently increasing. In addition, it is believed that this population is becoming resident instead of migratory, as warmer temperatures due to climate change are allowing individuals to overwinter.

It is a strong flier and disperses widely in the summer, but it rarely survives the winter in northern latitudes (e.g. north of the Alps in Europe, or north of the Caucasus in Russia).

Moths in the genus Hemaris, also of the family Sphingidae, are known as "hummingbird moths" in the US and as "bee moths" in Europe. The similarities and differences in common names sometimes cause confusion between this species and the North American genus.

== Life cycle ==
Two or more broods are produced each year. The adult may be encountered at any time of the year, especially in the south of the range, where there may be three or four broods. It overwinters as an adult in a crevice among rocks, trees, and buildings. On very warm days it may emerge to feed in mid-winter. Unlike other moths, they have no sexual dimorphism in the size of their antennal lobes.

=== Ova ===
The glossy pale green ova (eggs) are spherical with a 1-millimetre (0.04 in) diameter. They are said to look like the flower buds of the host plant Galium, and that is where the female lays them. They hatch 6 to 8 days after laying. Up to 200 eggs may be laid by one female, each on a separate plant.

=== Larvae ===
Newly hatched larvae are clear yellow, and in the second instar assume their green coloration. The larva is green with two grey stripes bordered in cream along the sides and with a horn at the rear end typical of sphingids. The horn is purplish red, changing to blue with an orange tip in the last instar. They feed fully exposed on the top of the host plant and rest in among a tangle of stems. Although dependent on warmth and sun, the larval stage can be as rapid as 20 days.

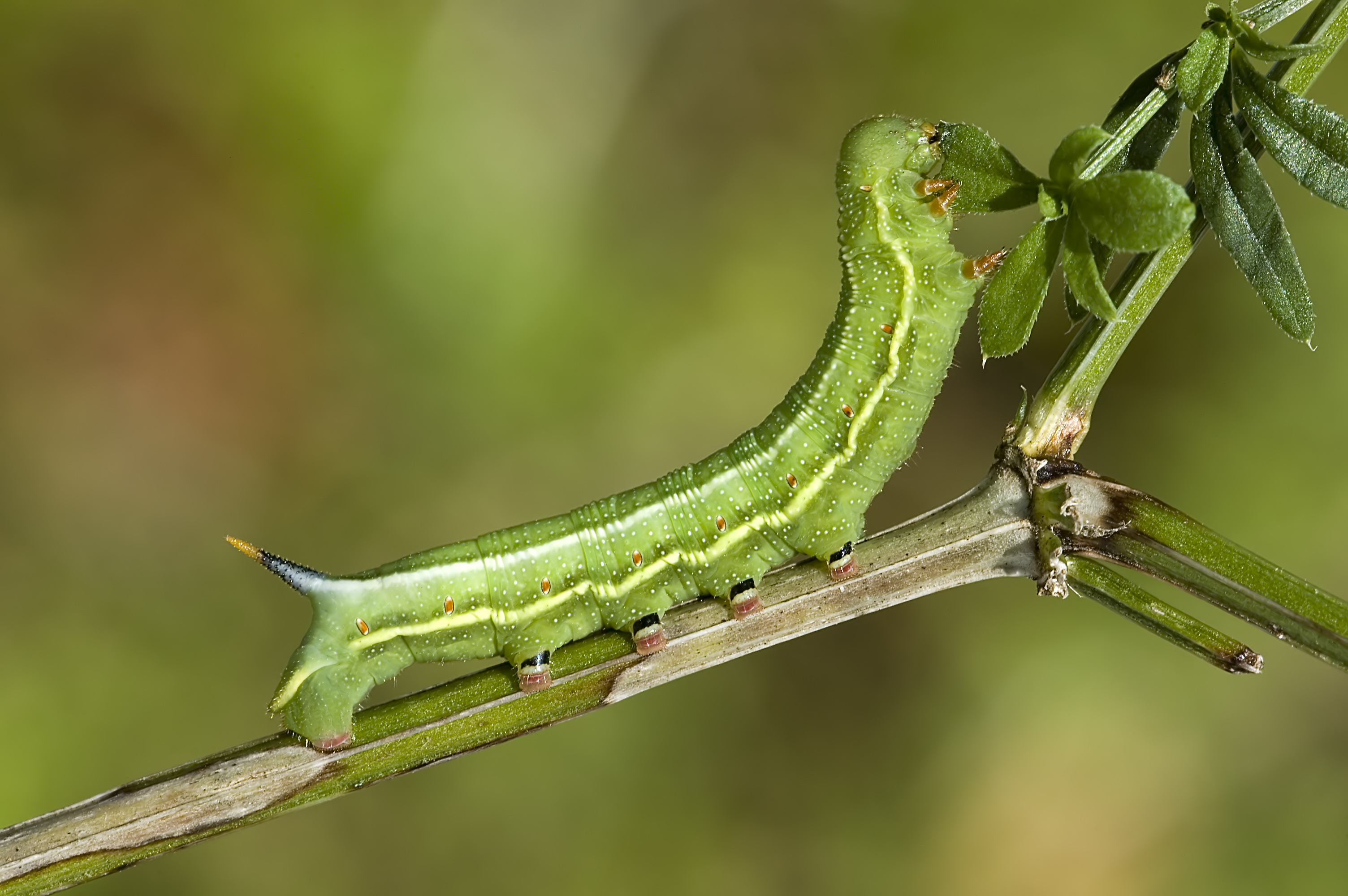
Larva of Macroglossum stellatarum

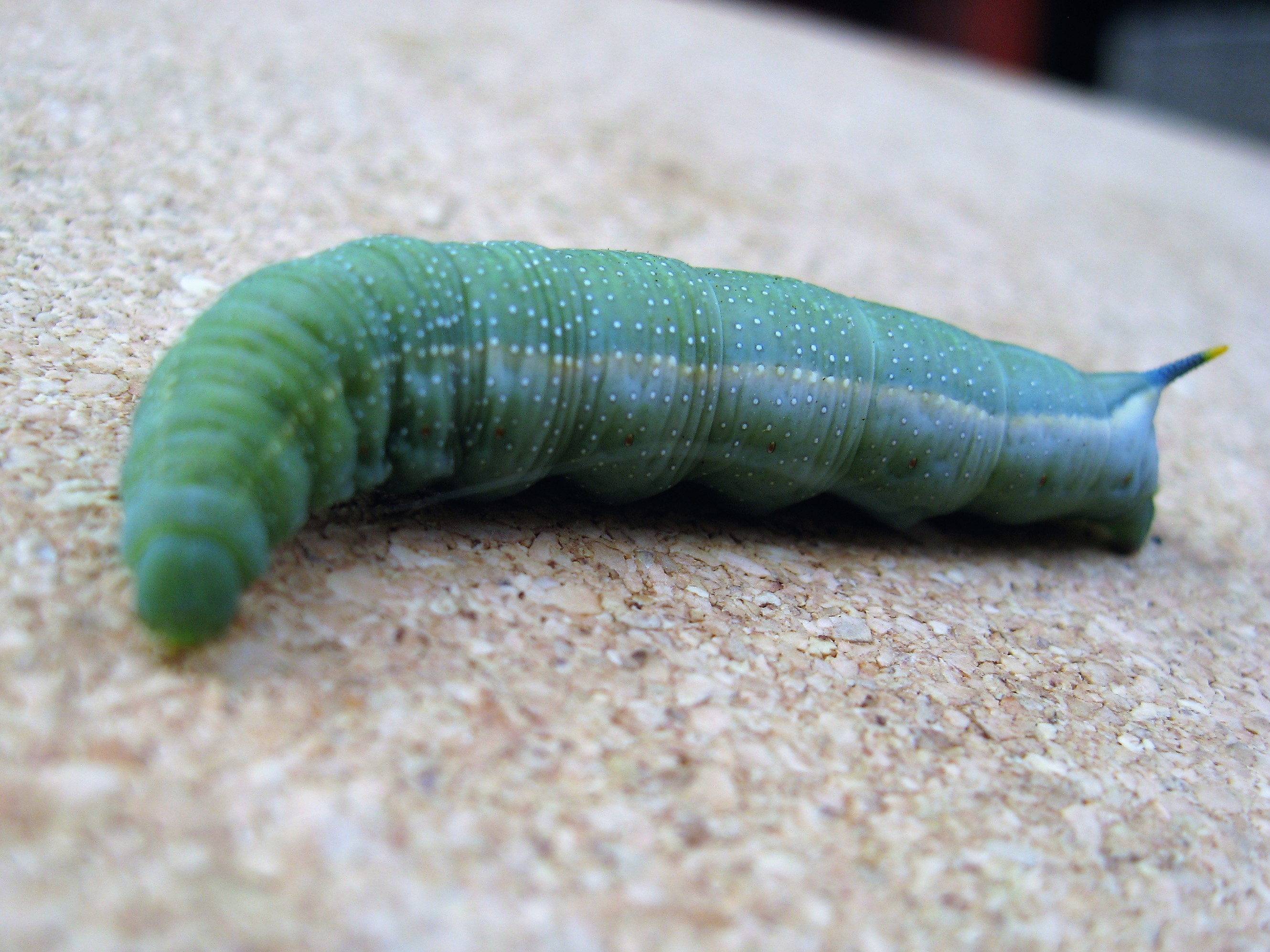
Larva of Macroglossum stellatarum, Hampshire, UK, while on prepupational walkabout

=== Pupae ===
The pupae are pale brownish with a prominent, keeled proboscis, and two sharp spines at the end of the cremaster. They are enclosed in loose silken cocoons among the host plant debris or on the ground among leaf litter.

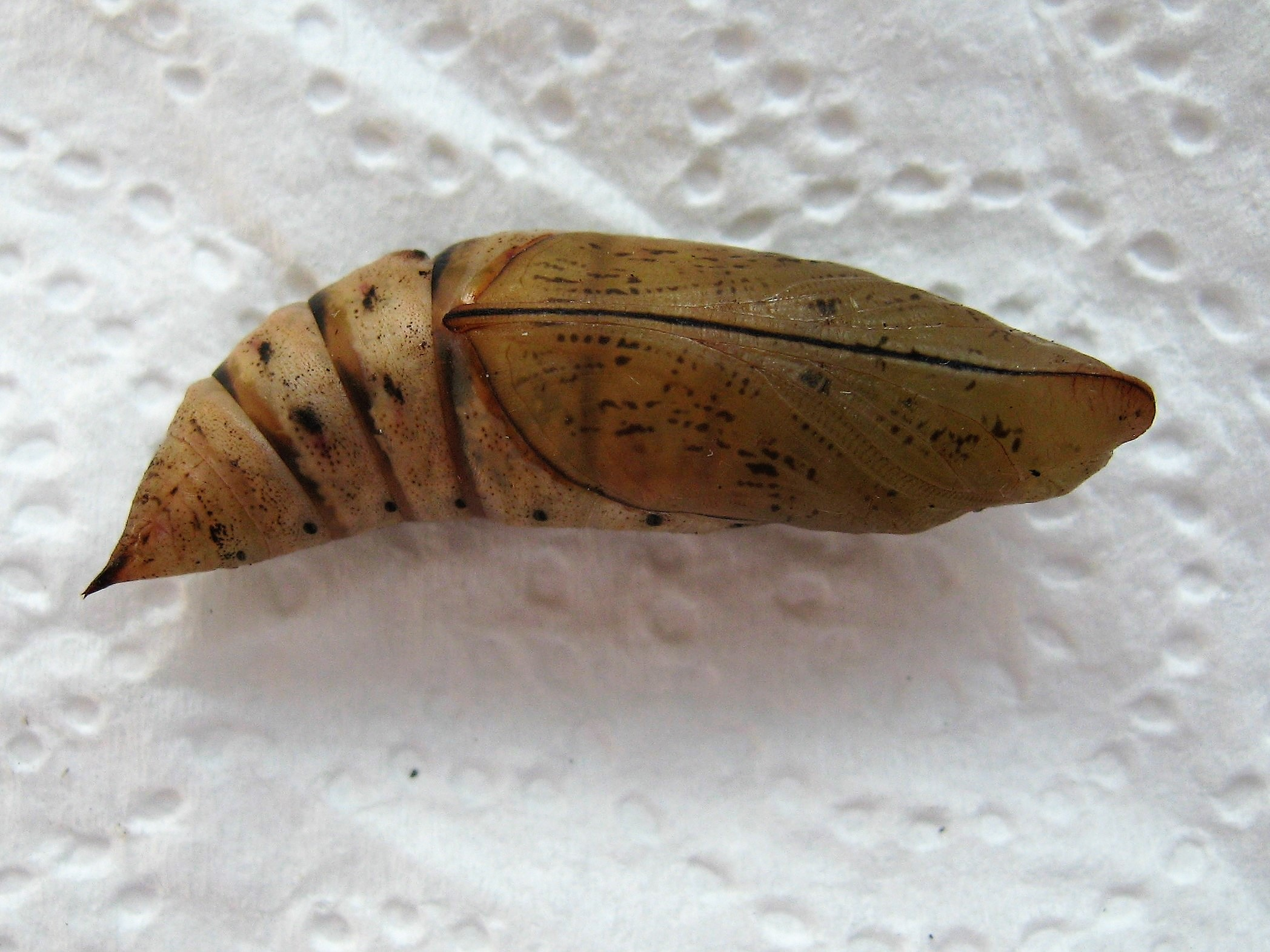
Pupa (2 weeks old) of hummingbird hawk

=== Adults ===
The forewings are brown, with black wavy lines across them, while the hindwings are orange with a black edge. The abdomen is quite broad, with a fan-tail of setae at the end. The wingspan is 40–45 millimetres (1.6–1.8 in).

In the southern parts of its range, the hummingbird hawk-moth is highly active even when temperatures are high, and thoracic temperatures above 45 °C (113 °F) have been measured. This is among the highest recorded for hawk-moths, and near the limit for insect muscle activity.

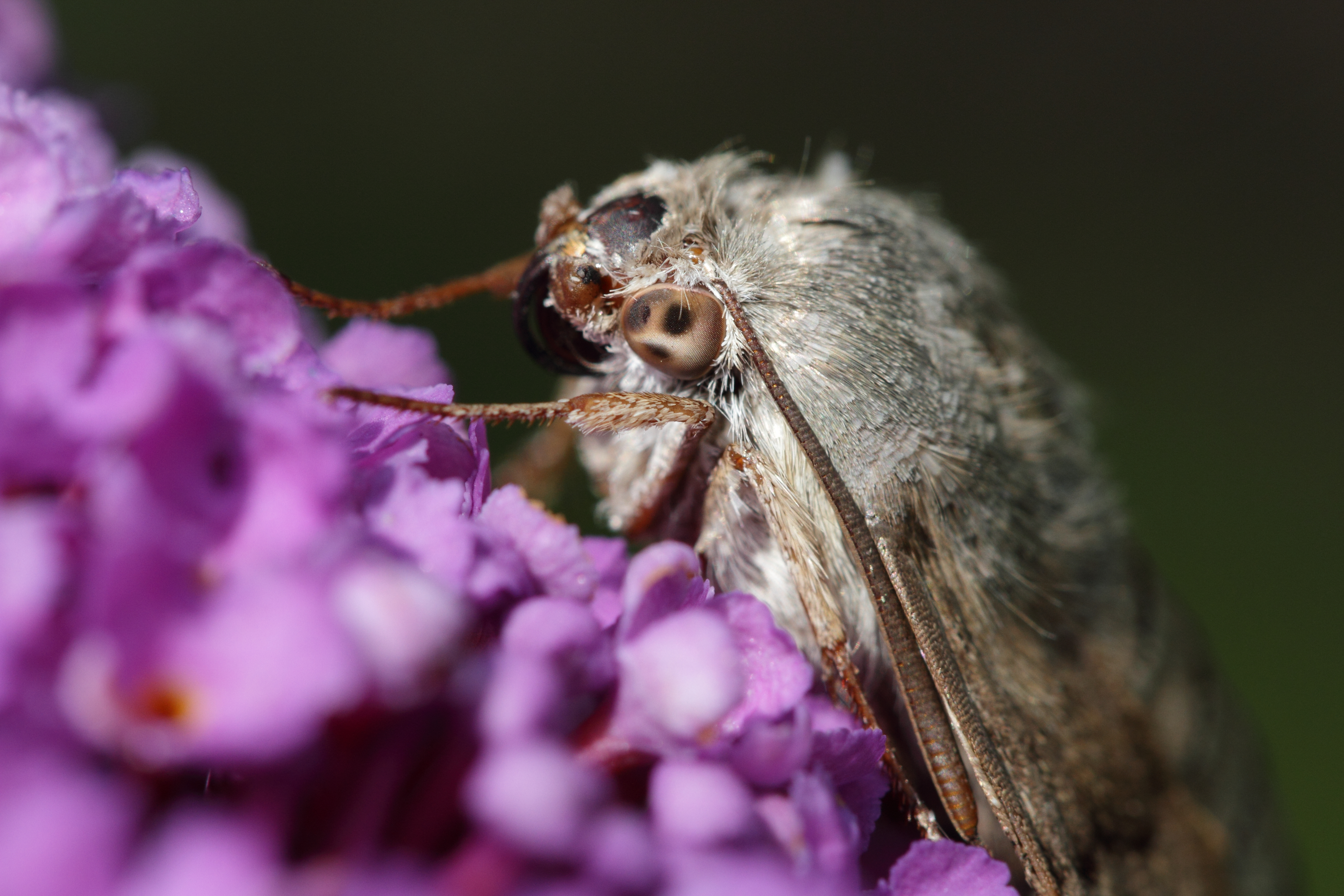
Closeup of its compound eye

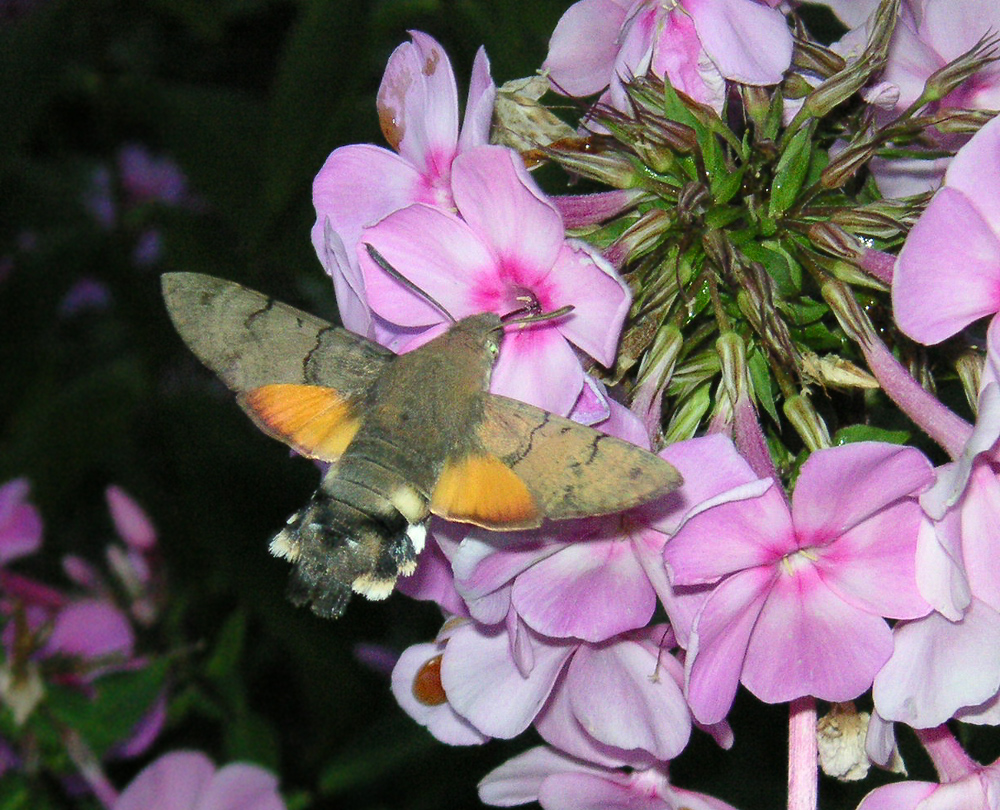
The wing action is frozen in this photo by using electronic flash. This picture was shot in Hanko, Finland, latitude 60°N.

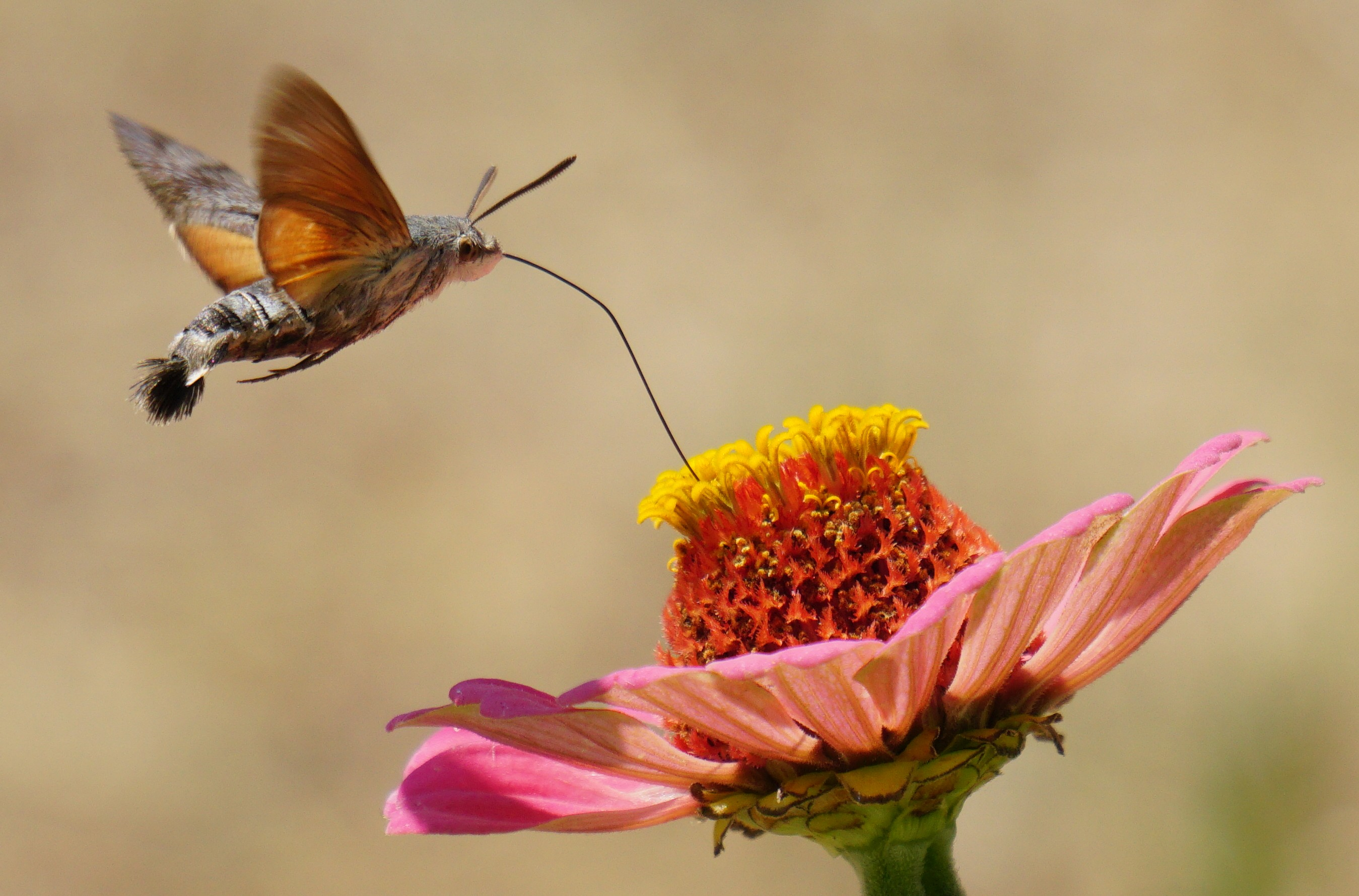
With proboscis extended, drinking nectar from a flower

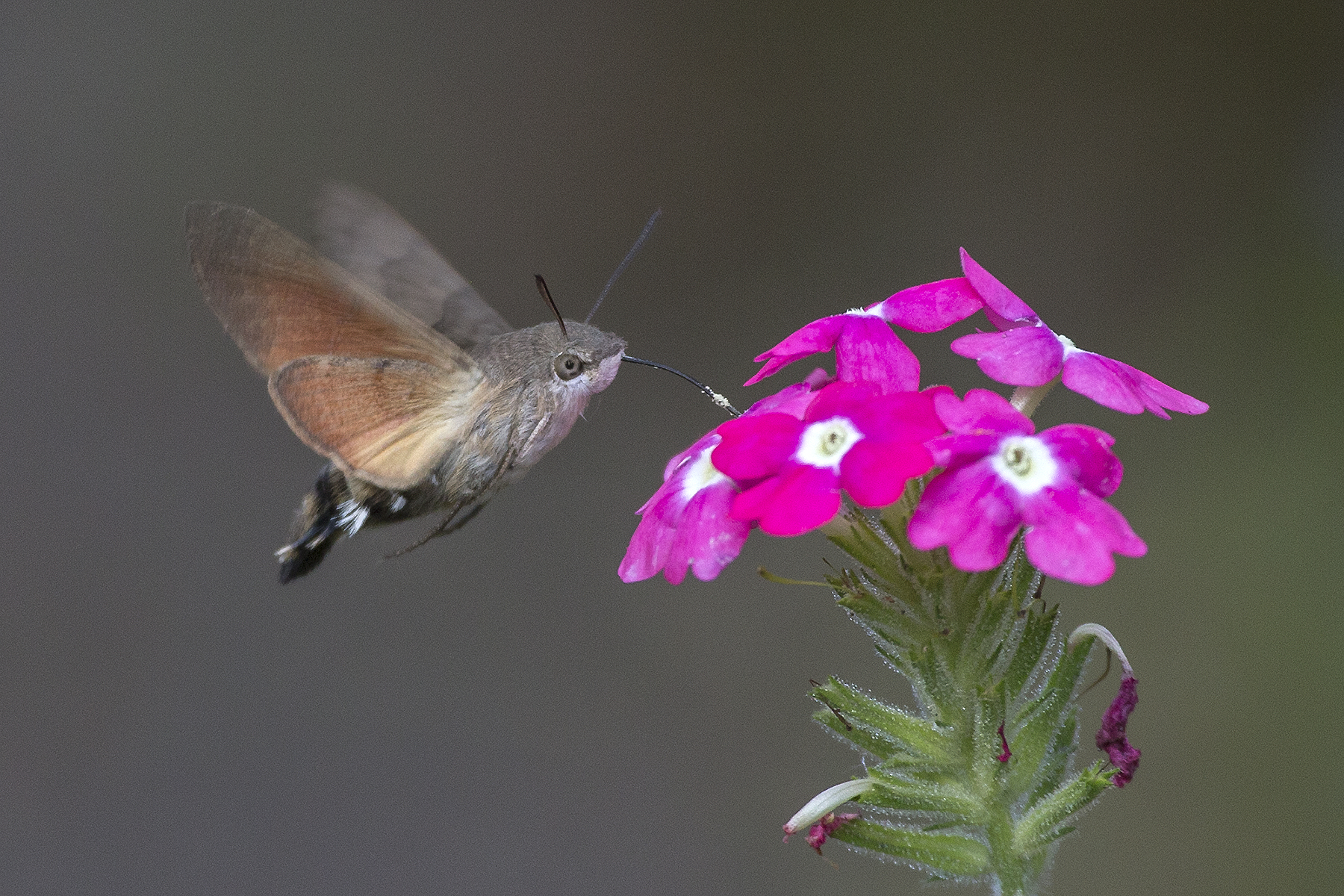
Nectaring on Verbena

Feeding on nectar from buddleja flowers, slowed to 1/4 speed.

Slow motion video

== Behaviour ==
Its long proboscis (25–28 mm (1.0–1.1 in)) and its hovering behavior, accompanied by an audible humming noise, make it look remarkably like a hummingbird while feeding on flowers. Like hummingbirds, it feeds on flowers which have tube-shaped corollae. It should not be confused with the moths called hummingbird moths in North America, genus Hemaris, members of the same family and with similar appearance and behavior. The resemblance to hummingbirds is an example of convergent evolution. It flies during the day, especially in bright sunshine, but also at dusk, dawn, and even in the rain, which is unusual for even diurnal hawkmoths. M. stellatarum engages in free hovering flight, which allows more maneuverability and control than fixed-wing flight, despite high energetic cost. Like many large insects, it relies upon Johnston's organs for body positioning information.

== Vision ==
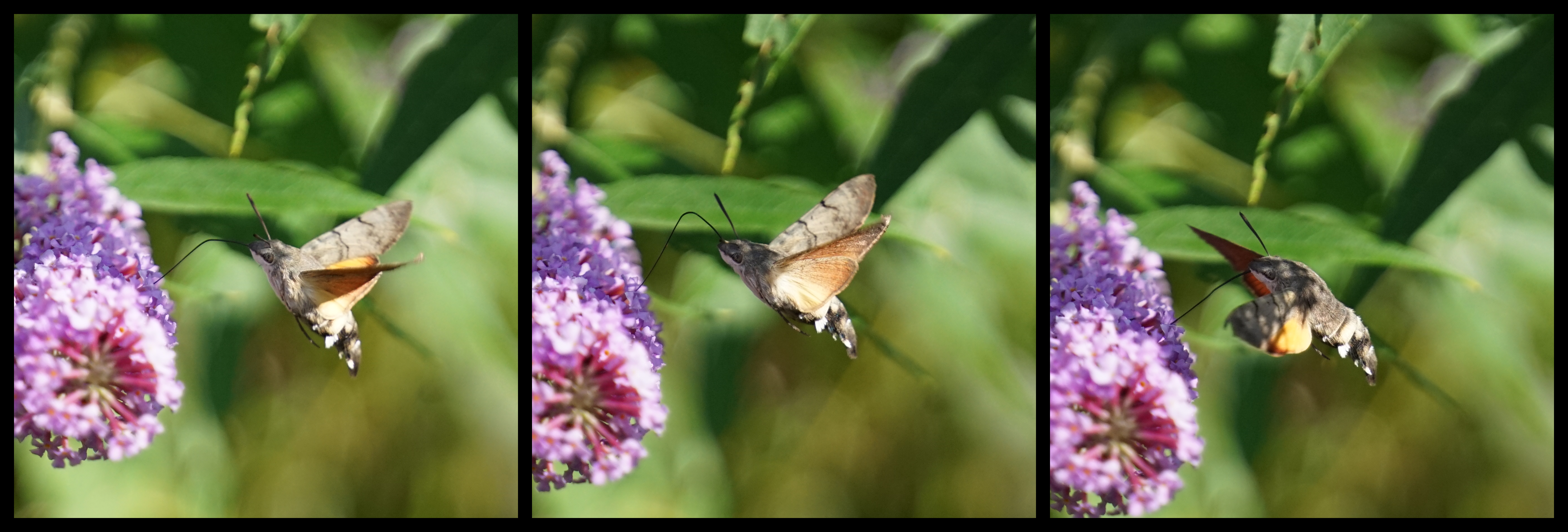
Nectaring process on Buddleja (5 frames/second)

The hummingbird hawkmoth's visual abilities have been studied extensively, and they have demonstrated a relatively good ability to learn colours. They have a trichromatic visual system, and are most sensitive to wavelength in the range of 349–521 nm. They have been shown to discriminate a wavelength difference as small as 1–2 nm between sources. This discrimination is even more precise than Apis mellifera, or the western honey bee. Among other flower visitors, their visual system is similar to Papilio xuthus, or the Asian swallowtail butterfly, and Deilephila elpenor, the nocturnal elephant hawkmoth. Their food preference is based mainly on visual identification, while D. elpenor preference relies upon olfactory identification. Compared to D. elpenor, M. stellatarum have a much smaller number of ommatidia, but a larger optic lobe volume to provide more visual processing tissue.

== Habitat and host plants ==
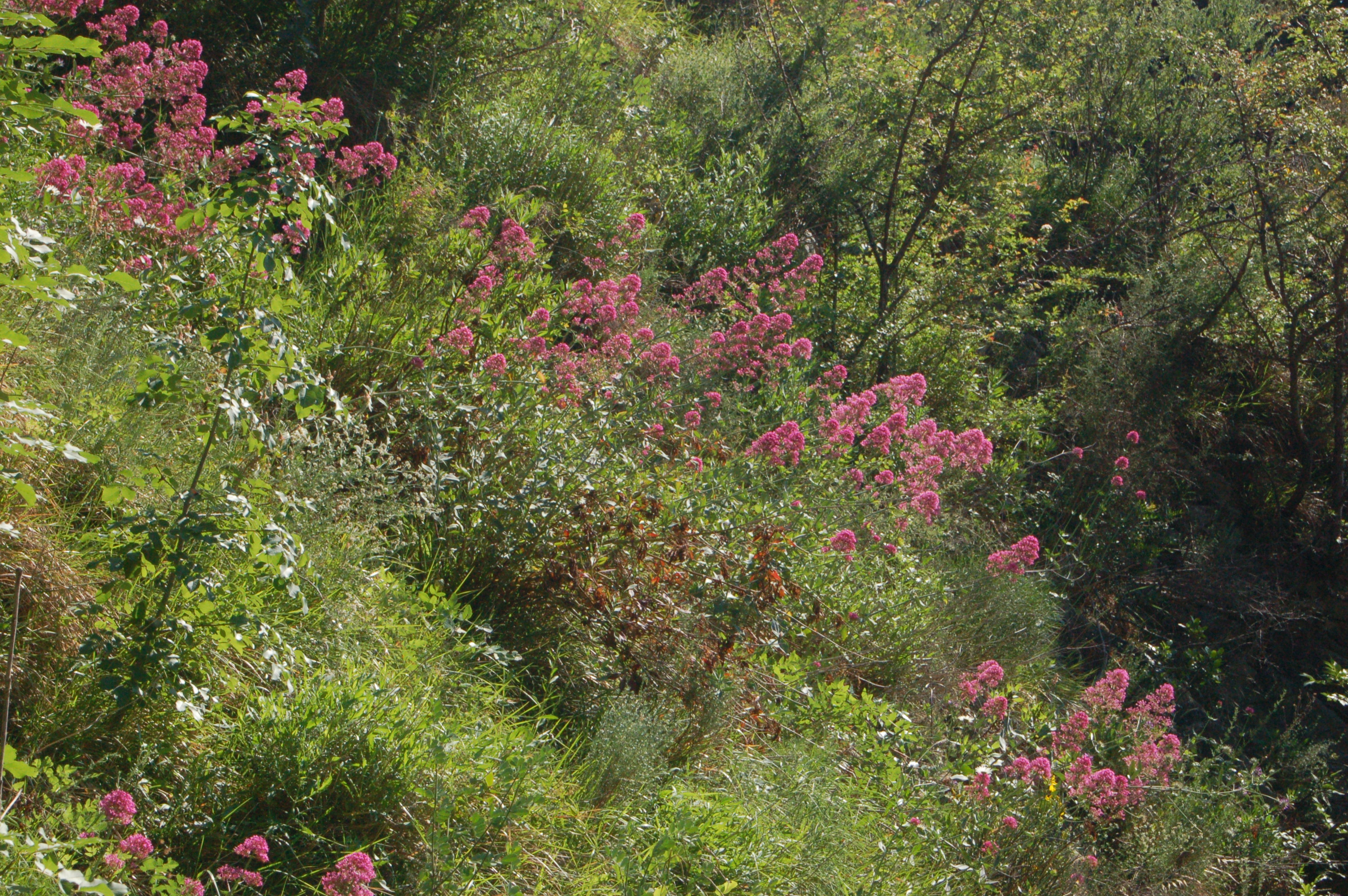
One of the preferred habitats of M. stellatarum (woodland edge with red valerian)

Hummingbird hawk-moths can be easily seen in gardens, parks, meadows, bushes, and woodland edge, where the preferred food plants grow (honeysuckle, red valerian and many others).

Their larvae usually feed on bedstraws or madders (Rubia) but have been recorded on other Rubiaceae and Centranthus, Stellaria, and Epilobium.

Adults are particularly fond of nectar-rich flowers with a long and narrow calyx, since they can then take advantage of their long proboscis and avoid competition from other insects. Flowers with longer tubes typically present the feeding animal a higher nectar reward. The evolution of proboscis length is thought to have been influenced by the length of flowers' feeding tubes. Examples of such plants include Centranthus, Jasminum, Buddleia, Nicotiana, Primula, Viola, Syringa, Verbena, Echium, Phlox, and Stachys. They are reported to trap-line, that is, to return to the same flower beds at about the same time each day.

== In culture ==
Hummingbird hawk-moths have been seen as a lucky omen. In particular, a swarm of the moths was seen flying across the English Channel on D-Day, the day of the Normandy landings in the Second World War. These moths, along with other moths, are in the family Sphingidae because their larvae were thought to resemble the Egyptian Sphinx. The They Might Be Giants song "Bee of the Bird of the Moth" is about the hummingbird moth.
