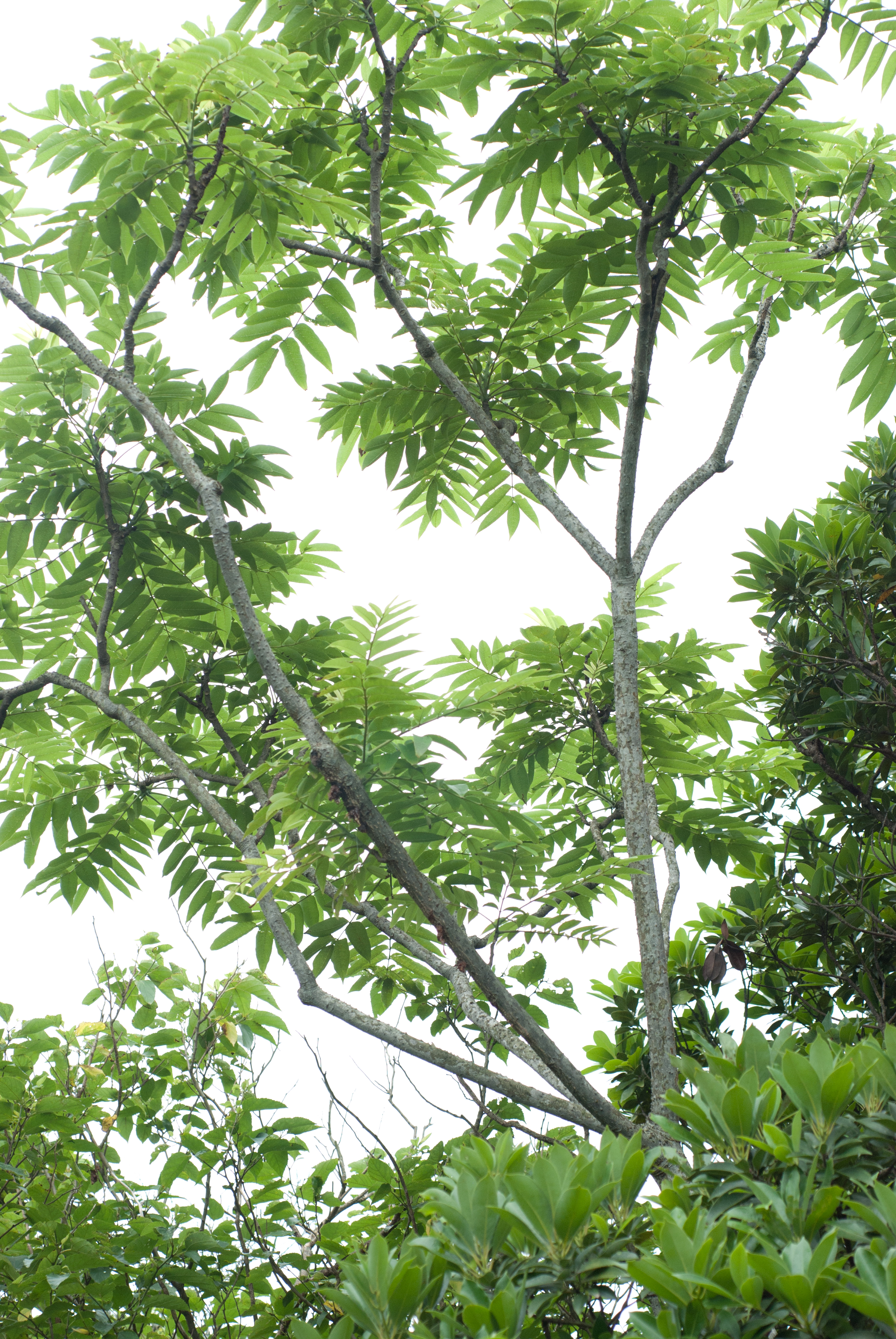

Scientific classification
- Kingdom: Plantae
- Clade: Tracheophytes
- Clade: Angiosperms
- Clade: Eudicots
- Clade: Rosids
- Order: Sapindales
- Family: Rutaceae
- Genus: Zanthoxylum
- Species: Z. ailanthoides

Binomial name
- Zanthoxylum ailanthoides Siebold & Zucc.

= Zanthoxylum ailanthoides =

Species of flowering plant

Zanthoxylum ailanthoides, also called ailanthus-like prickly ash, (Chinese: 椿叶花椒; pinyin: chun ye hua jiao, lit. "Ailanthus-leaved pepper", Chinese: 越椒; pinyin: yue-jiao; Wade–Giles: yüeh-chiao, lit. "Yue pepper", 食茱萸 shi zhu yu, lit. "edible shān zhū yú"; Japanese: カラスザンショウ, からすのさんしょう karasu-zanshō, karasu-no-sanshō, lit. "crow prickly ash") is an Asiatic plant of the prickly-ash genus Zanthoxylum, natively occurring in forest-covered parts of southeastern China, Taiwan, Southeast Asia, and Japan from Honshu southward. The piquant fruit serves as a local substitute for the ordinary red-pepper in China before the Columbian exchange. In Taiwan, the young leaves are used in cuisines.

Though some refer to the species as "Japanese prickly-ash", that name is confusing since it is sometimes applied to the sanshō which is Z. piperitum. Z. ailanthoides is not normally exploited for human consumption in Japan, except by the prehistoric people from the Jōmon period. It is foraged in the wild by the Japanese macaque.

A regional nickname is tara, and in fact, its young shoots are often mistaken for the true tara (Aralia elata) by gatherers of wild plants. The Latin name ailanthoides of the species comes from its leaves resembling those of the Ailanthus.

Like other genera of plants in the rue family, it serves as the host food plant for the larvae of several Continental Asian swallowtail butterfly species, such as Papilio bianor, Papilio helenus, Papilio protenor, and Papilio xuthus.

== Sources ==
- Zhang, Dianxiang; Hartley, Thomas G. (2008), "1. Zanthoxylum Linnaeus, Sp. Pl. 1: 270. 1753.", Flora of China, 11: 53–66 PDF
- Hu, Shiu-ying (2005), Food plants of China (preview), vol. 1, Chinese University Press, ISBN 9789629962296
- Stuart, George Arthur; Smith, Frederick Porter (1985), Chinese materia medica (snippet), vol. vegetable kingdom, Southern Materials Center, 1985
