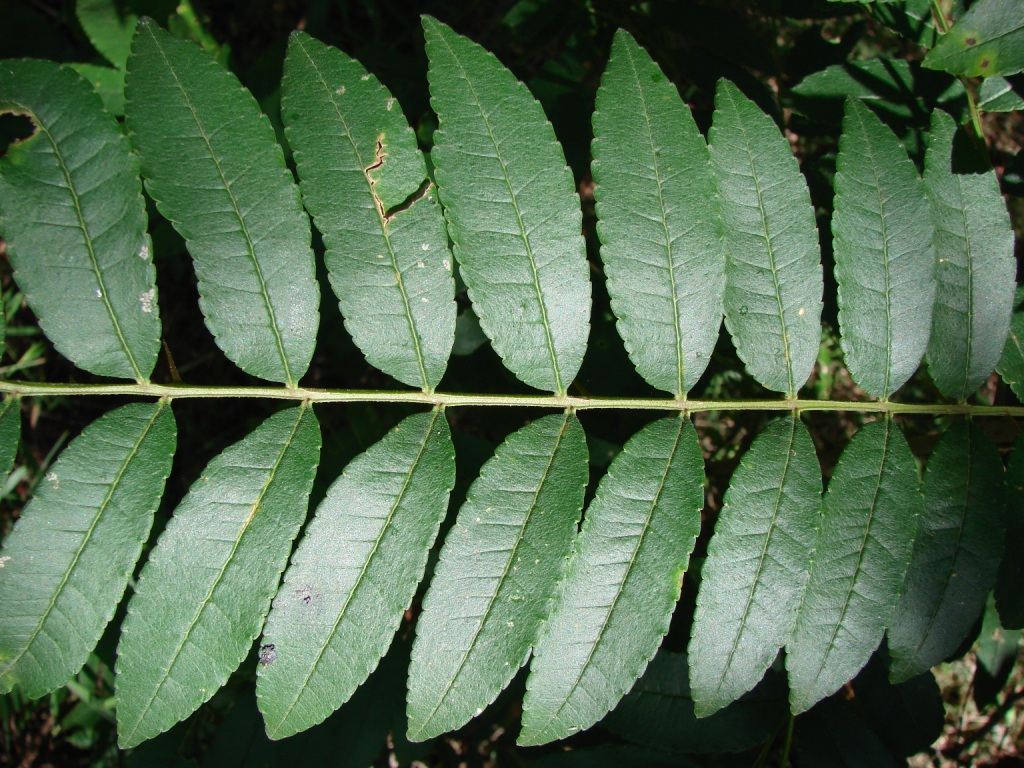
- A leaf of Zanthoxylum rhoifolium with many pairs of leaflets

Conservation status
- Least Concern (IUCN 3.1)

Scientific classification
- Kingdom: Plantae
- Clade: Tracheophytes
- Clade: Angiosperms
- Clade: Eudicots
- Clade: Rosids
- Order: Sapindales
- Family: Rutaceae
- Genus: Zanthoxylum
- Species: Z. rhoifolium

Binomial name
- Zanthoxylum rhoifolium Lam.

= Zanthoxylum rhoifolium =

Species of tree

Zanthoxylum rhoifolium is a species of tree in the family Rutaceae. It is known by the common names mamica de cadela, tambataru, and prickly ash. It is native to Central and South America. It is a common tree on the Cerrado.

== Description ==
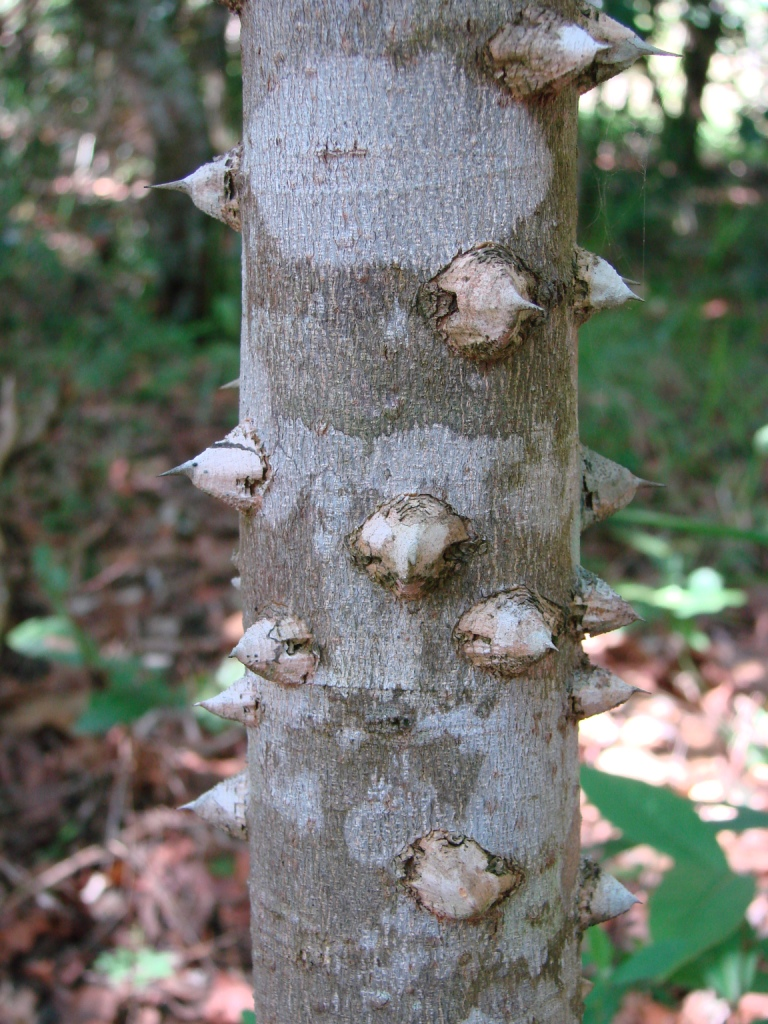
detailed view of the trunk

This species is a deciduous tree reaching up to 12 meters in height. It produces a spherical black capsule about half a centimeter in length and width containing small, hard-coated seeds. It has cone-shaped thorns on its trunk and branches.

== Ecology ==
The tree is not shade tolerant, so it can be found in open areas in and around forests.

== Uses ==
This is a medicinal plant. The bark is used to treat toothache and earache. It is used as an anti-inflammatory. It is used to treat malaria. Parts of the plant also have antibacterial and fungicidal action.

== Chemical compounds ==
It contains nitidine, an alkaloid with anti-malarial action. It is of commercial value as a component of herbal remedies for malaria.
