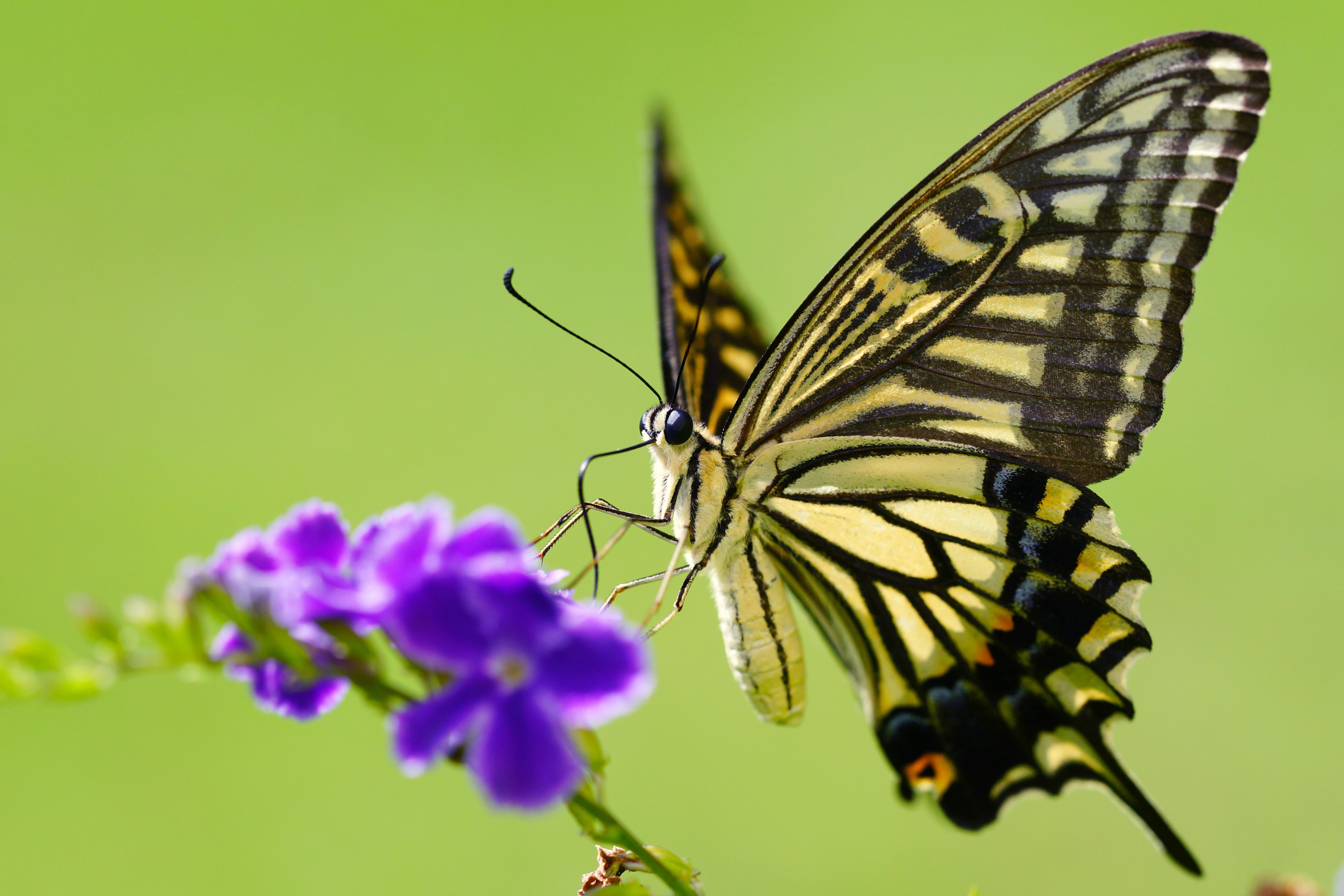

Conservation status
- Apparently Secure (NatureServe)

Scientific classification
- Kingdom: Animalia
- Phylum: Arthropoda
- Clade: Pancrustacea
- Class: Insecta
- Order: Lepidoptera
- Family: Papilionidae
- Genus: Papilio
- Species: P. xuthus

Binomial name
- Papilio xuthus Linnaeus, 1767

= Papilio xuthus =

Species of butterfly

Papilio xuthus, the Asian swallowtail, Chinese yellow swallowtail, Japanese swallowtail, Korean swallowtail or Xuthus swallowtail, is a yellow-colored, medium to large sized swallowtail butterfly found in northeast Asia, northern Myanmar, southern China, Taiwan, the Korean Peninsula, Japan (from Hokkaidō to the Yaeyama Islands), Siberia and the Hawaiian Islands. The butterfly has been observed thrice in New Zealand. Once in Dunedin in 1996 emerging from a chrysalis in a car yard specializing in Japanese used cars; it is thought the chrysalis arrived through one of the cars. and later in Auckland in 2011 and 2016. It was also recorded in the state of Arunachal Pradesh, India, in 2014.

It mates multiple times in its life, leading to an increased genetic diversity in its young. It is preyed upon by a host of organisms, including the tree cricket Oecanthus longicauda, ant Lasius niger, and wasps (Polistes and Trogus mactator). P. xuthus utilizes color vision and color constancy while foraging for plants of the family Rutaceae.

It is common and not threatened. Papilio xuthus is common in urban, suburban, woods and orange orchards. The flight period is from May to August.

Males use both physical and visual cues to attract mates during the breeding season. Females of the species regularly mate with multiple partners. After mating, females use habitat and food quality to determine where they will oviposit their eggs.

== Taxonomy ==
Papilio xuthus is a member of the genus Papilio. It is of the family Papilionidae and order Lepidoptera. It was first introduced in Hawaii in 1971 from Japan or Guam. P. xuthus makes significant seasonal migrations over 200 km. There are three subspecies of P. xuthus: Papilio xuthus xuthus, Papilio xuthus koxinga, and Papilio xuthus neoxuthus.

== Description ==
Video of Papilio xuthus in Tokyo, Japan

The Asian swallowtail is a mid-sized, yellow, prominently-tailed butterfly. It has a wingspan of 90 to 110 mm. Its normal color pattern consists of a black pattern on a yellow background. Wing coloration is sexually dimorphic, with females showing broader proximal marginal bands in the hindwing. Blue-iridescent and orange scales separate the black bands on the hindwing. The black bands also run in stripes of varying thickness along the forewing. The young caterpillar mimics bird feces and has a white and brown spot on its head. As they mature, caterpillars develop a light green body color with brown spots.

=== Wing coloration ===
P. xuthus have highly sensitive photoreceptors, or ommatidia, that can detect a wide range of wavelengths. This adaptation helps them identify members of their own species. Their distinct coloring and patterning are what sets them apart from other butterflies. Wing color is derived from "scales", and P. xuthus has scales of yellow (cream), orange, black, and blue from the light each scale absorbs and reflects. Spectrophotometer studies saw that the yellow scales absorbed in the UV to violet range, orange absorbed in the lower half-wavelengths of the visible spectrum, black scales absorbed in most of the visible light range, and blue scales absorbed very little light. These absorbance ranges are due to the pigment molecules contained in each wing scale. Yellow and orange contain papiliochrome II and black contains melanin. The blue scales are unique in that they don't have a pigment molecule, and are instead colored by an optical phenomenon. The interaction of light with the upper and lower lamina of the scale gives them the distinct blue color that we see.

Experimental manipulation of wing coloration has been achieved through administration of the acid carboxypeptidase, Molsin. Injection of Molsin into 0-2 day pupae, butterflies had high amounts of black wing scales. These modified subjects had produced high amounts of melanin and papiliochrome II. Injection of Molsin into 3-4 day pupae shows no change in wing coloration. This indicates that P. xuthus likely has an acid carboxypeptidase of its own that naturally induces production of these pigments, and its action lasts during the first two days of pupation. Administration of a higher amount of acid carboxypeptidase to the pupae at 0–2 days induces an overproduction of pigmentation molecules, which leads to a high number of black scales.

P. xuthus uses wing coloration and patterning to identify insects of the same species. Sexual behaviors are elicited from males by visual identification alone. Adult P. xuthus males were able to find odorless conspecifics, and while they do not discriminate by sex, they can identify a female once physical contact is made.

== Courtship and mating ==
During the mating season, Asian swallowtail males fly through the foliage of trees in search of a mate. If a male encounters a female resting on a plant with open and horizontal wings, it approaches her and examines her by contacting his forelegs with the tips of her wings. In addition, males use visual cues to conduct the mating ritual and are particularly attracted to closely spaced yellow patches on female wings.

Most females of the Asian swallowtail butterfly mate more than once in their life. This behavior is typical of many other swallowtail butterflies including P. glaucus, P. helenus and P. protenor. Multiple matings leads to an increased genetic diversity of swallowtail offspring. In addition, multiple matings allow females to produce a greater number of eggs, of which there can be up to thirty.

=== Oviposition ===
Female butterflies disperse when they are about to oviposit. They decide on the number of eggs they deposit in different subhabitats by certain criteria such as the quality of the subhabitat, the existing adult population in the area, the quantity of young leaves in the vicinity, the degree of sun exposure (females prefer sunnier areas), and host plant height.

== Mortality factors ==
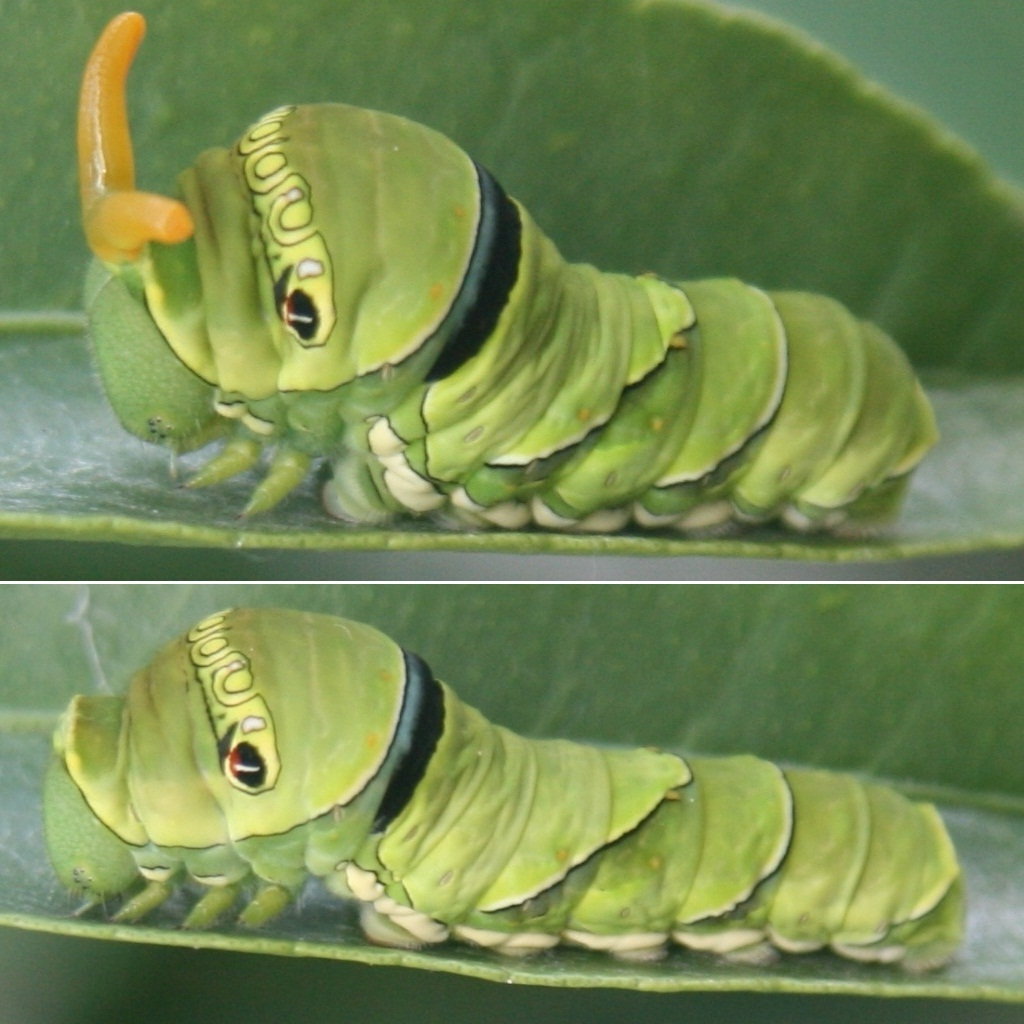
P. xuthus larva - upper: osmeterium everted - lower: undisturbed

=== Predation ===
Some insects, such as the grasshopper Oeanthus longicauda, are capable of removing Asian swallowtail larvae out of their eggs before they hatch. During the first and second larval instars, their main predators are ants (particularly Lasius niger), spiders, and various other bugs. It is not a common prey to birds, due to early larval instars presenting coloration resembling bird feces.

Asian swallowtail caterpillars may also be parasitized by wasps, such as Trogus mactator and Pteromalus puparum, during development. These wasps ultimately kill the larvae after pupation. In fact, wasps have been observed emerging from the host pupa four or five days after the predicted date of emergence of the host.

=== Environment ===
Aside from predation, larval mortality rate is also affected by diseases that appear to correlate with the duration of the rainy season. Long days of rain in autumn lead to the rotting of infected larvae.

== Foraging ==
Asian swallowtail butterflies exhibit color vision which gives them the ability to differentiate objects of contrasting colors irrespective of brightness. They also exhibit color constancy, which allows them to recognize the color of an organism regardless of the background light. Asian swallowtail butterflies show this color constancy even when the background light is yellow and red. This ability is important for foraging, as it allows butterflies to recognize certain flowers in an area irrespective of whether the flower is in the shade or in the sun.

=== Food plants ===
The larvae of the species feed on plants of family Rutaceae. Recorded species of food plants include:

- Phellodendron amurense
- Poncirus trifoliata
- Zanthoxylum species, such as the Japanese pepper tree (Z. piperitum), Z. nitidum and the Japanese prickly-ash Z. ailanthoides
- Cultivated Citrus species such as mandarin orange and yuzu
- Euodia ruaecarpa
- Ruta graveolens (rue)
- "Bauhinia" species, such as Hong Kong Orchid Tree

== Development and population dynamics ==
Despite its wide distribution, populations of the Asian swallowtail remain at a stable, relatively low, level. There are typically four to five generations per year with the adults of the first generation emerging from mid-April to early May and adults of the second generation emerging in mid-June. P. xuthus will lay single eggs on leaves of host plants, allowing hatched larvae to feed on Poncirus trifoliata, Zanthoxylum ailanthoides and various citrus species. The larval stage lasts for approximately three to five weeks while the pupal stage is around two weeks.

According to a study, the population fluctuation of the Asian swallowtail butterfly has been surprisingly stable compared to that of various other insects. The stability of the population appeared to be regulated by the population dynamics of egg the parasitoids, Trichogramma, and the pupal parasitoids, Pteromalus puparum, which maintained shorter life spans and generation times than the eggs of the Asian swallowtail. When the butterfly population reaches a high density, because of the shorter generational turn around of the parasites, intergeneration responses of the parasites are faster than those of the butterflies, resulting in a responding increased growth of the parasites. This creates an evolutionary stable system to keep the population of both the parasites and the host in check. It was also found that among the subpopulations studied, exchanges between each subpopulation helped to maintain the stability of the entire population as a whole.

== Gallery ==
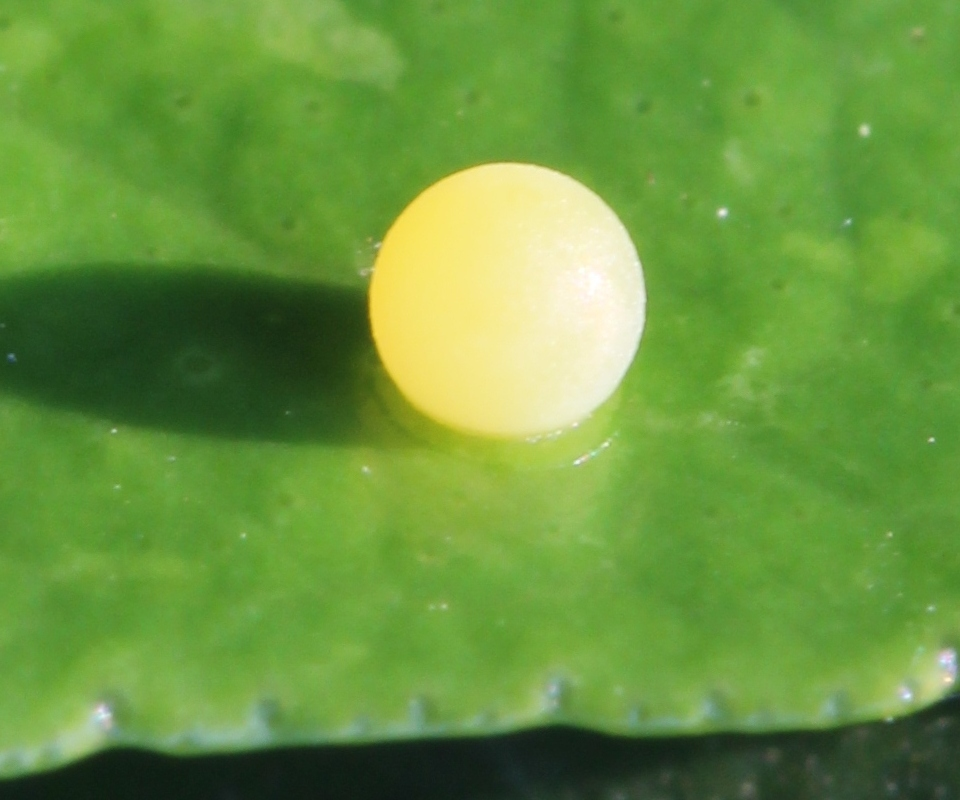
Egg

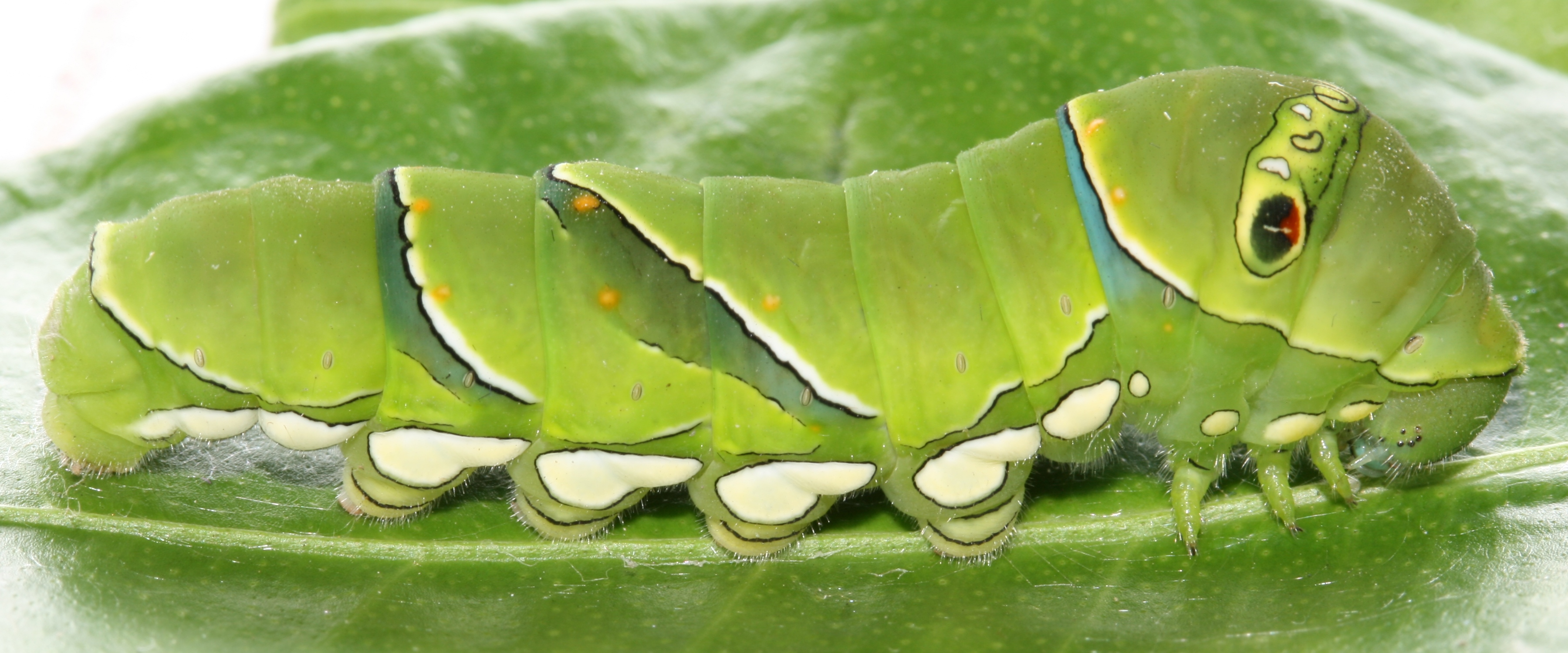
Caterpillar

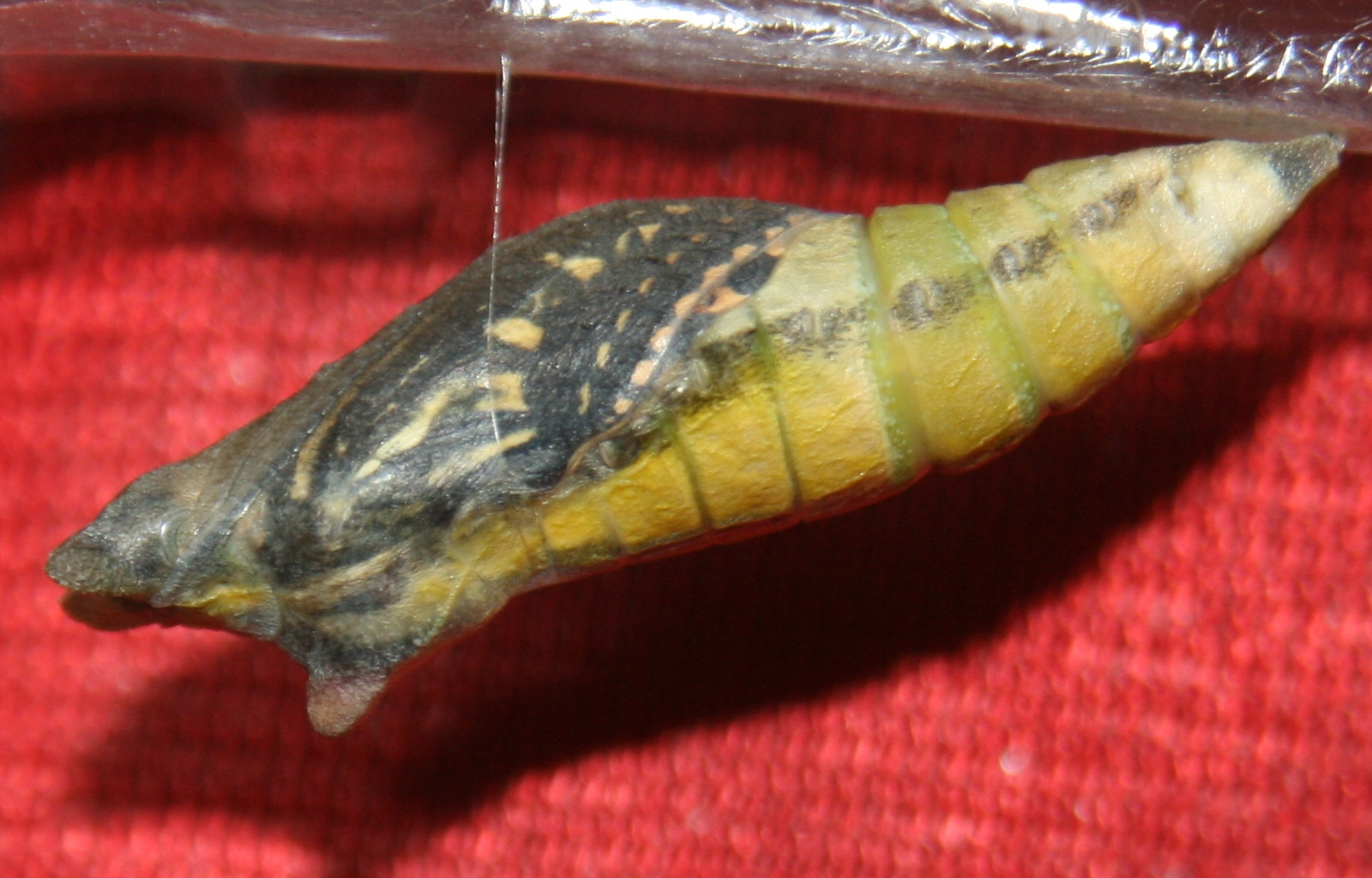
Pupa

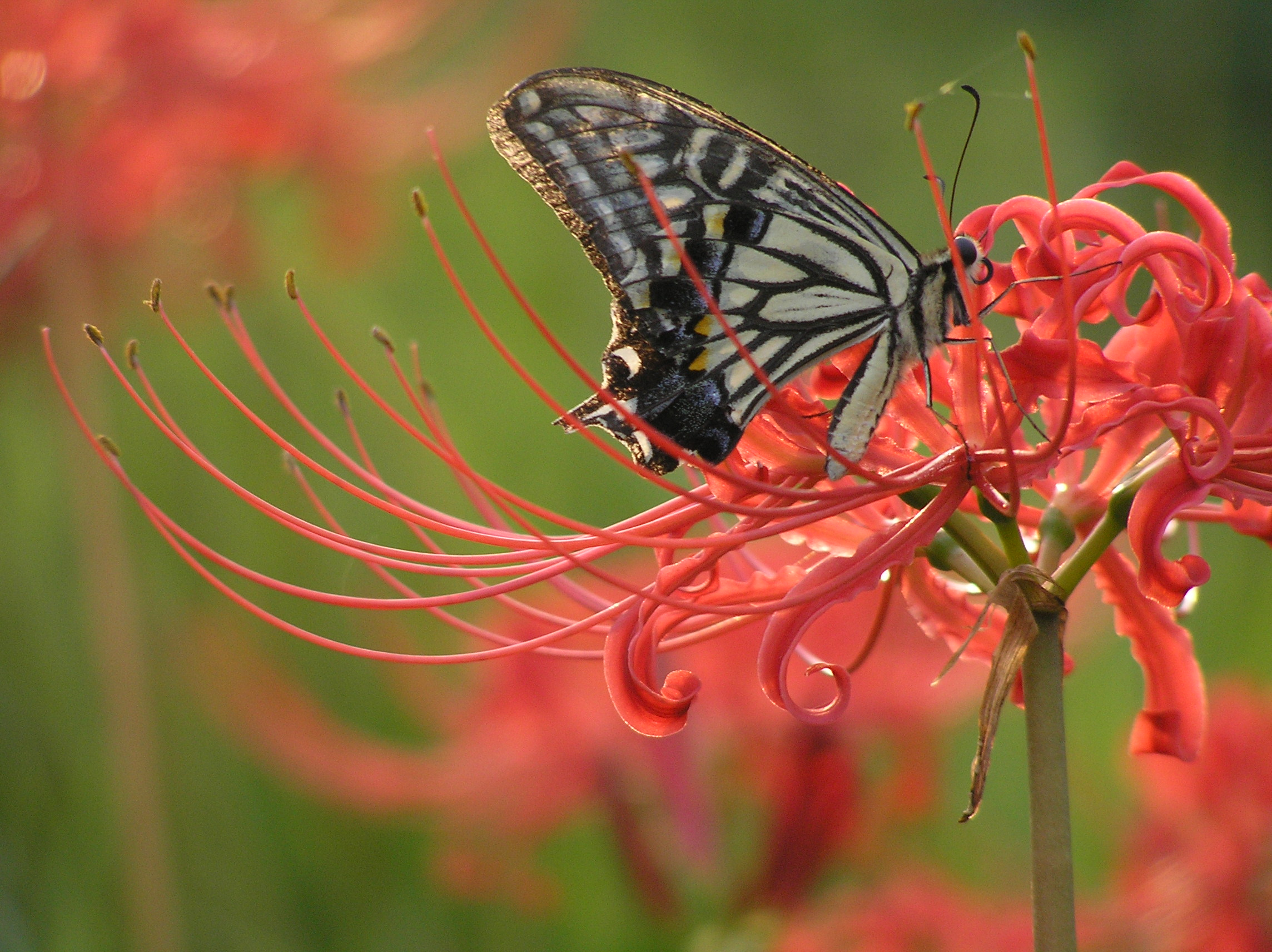
On Lycoris radiata

== See also ==
- Papilionidae
