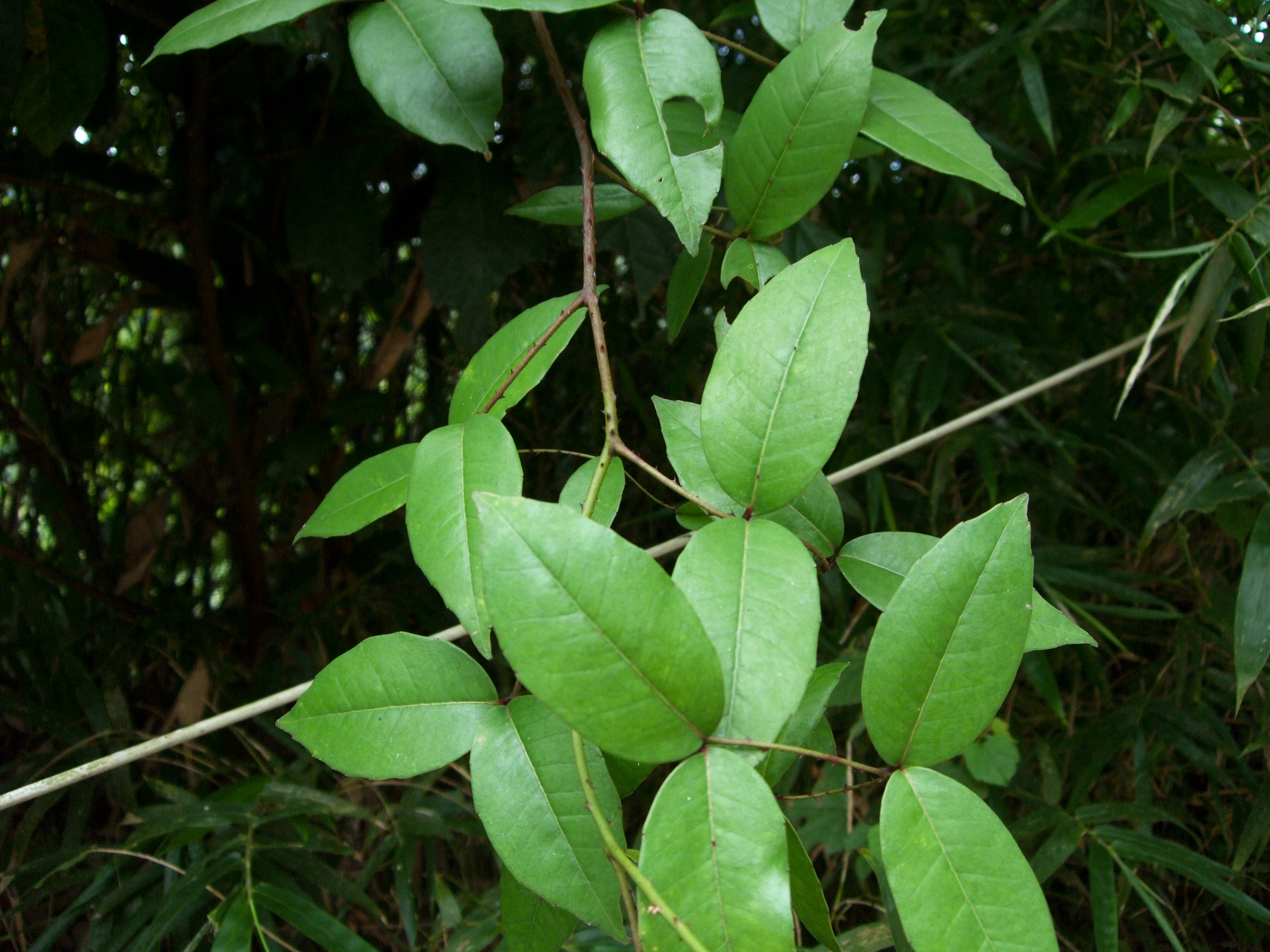

Conservation status
- Least Concern (IUCN 3.1)

Scientific classification
- Kingdom: Plantae
- Clade: Tracheophytes
- Clade: Angiosperms
- Clade: Eudicots
- Clade: Rosids
- Order: Sapindales
- Family: Rutaceae
- Genus: Zanthoxylum
- Species: Z. nitidum

Binomial name
- Zanthoxylum nitidum (Roxb.) DC.

Synonyms
- Fagara nitida Roxb.; Fagara torva (F.Muell.) Engl.; Xanthoxylon torvum F.Muell. orth. var.; Xanthoxylum torvum F.Muell. orth. var.; Zanthoxylum torvum F.Muell.

= Zanthoxylum nitidum =

Shiny-leaf prickly-ash

Species of flowering plant

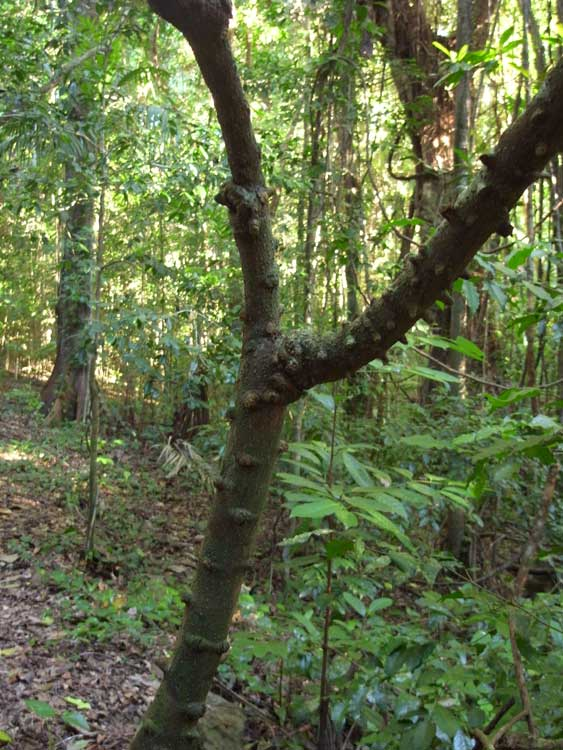
Main stem

Zanthoxylum nitidum, commonly known as shiny-leaf prickly-ash, is a species of flowering plant in the family Rutaceae. It is a woody climber with prickles on the branchlets, thick, cone-shaped spines on the trunk and older branches, pinnate leaves with five to nine leaflets, and panicles or racemes of white to pale yellow, male or female flowers in leaf axils and on the ends of branchlets.

== Description ==
Zanthoxylum nitidum is a woody climber with curved prickles on the branchlets and thick, cone-shaped spines on the trunk and older branches. The leaves are pinnate, 100–340 mm (3.9–13.4 in) long with five to nine egg-shaped to elliptical leaflets. The leaflets are 45–100 mm (1.8–3.9 in) long and 20–50 mm (0.79–1.97 in) wide, the side leaflets sessile or on a petiolule up to 3 mm (0.12 in) long and the end leaflet on a petiolule 7–40 mm (0.28–1.57 in) long. The flowers are arranged in leaf axils or on the ends of branchlets in panicles or racemes up to 80 mm (3.1 in) long, each flower on a pedicel 1–1.5 mm (0.039–0.059 in) long. The four sepals are 0.5–0.8 mm (0.020–0.031 in) long and the four petals white or pale yellow, and 2–3 mm (0.079–0.118 in) long. The flowers are either functionally male or female, the male flowers with four stamens about 3.5 mm (0.14 in) long and four sterile, finger-like carpels. The female flowers lack stamens and have four carpels 1.5–2 mm (0.059–0.079 in) long. Flowering occurs from September to October and the fruit is a more or less spherical, red or brown follicle 5–7 mm (0.20–0.28 in) long.

== Taxonomy ==
Shiny-leaf prickly-ash was first formally described in 1824 by William Roxburgh who gave it the name Fagara nitida and published the description in Flora Indica, or, descriptions of Indian plants. In 1824, de Candolle changed the name to Zanthoxylum nitidum in his book, Prodromus Systematis Naturalis Regni Vegetabilis.

== Distribution ==
Zanthoxylum nitidum is found in India, South China, southeast Asia, and northern Australia. In Australia it grows in rainforest from sea level to an altitude of 400 m (1,300 ft) from the Daintree River south to Rockingham Bay.

== Uses ==
Zanxthoxylum nitidum is used as an insecticide and a piscicide.

In India and Nepal, the fruits are used as a condiment. However, the roots, leaves and fruit are poisonous, with as little as 40g of leaves considered to be a lethal dose.

== Chemical constituents ==
The plant contains the chemical compounds nitidine, toddalolactone, and chelerythrine.

The essential oil, at least from some varieties, contains limonene and geraniol.
