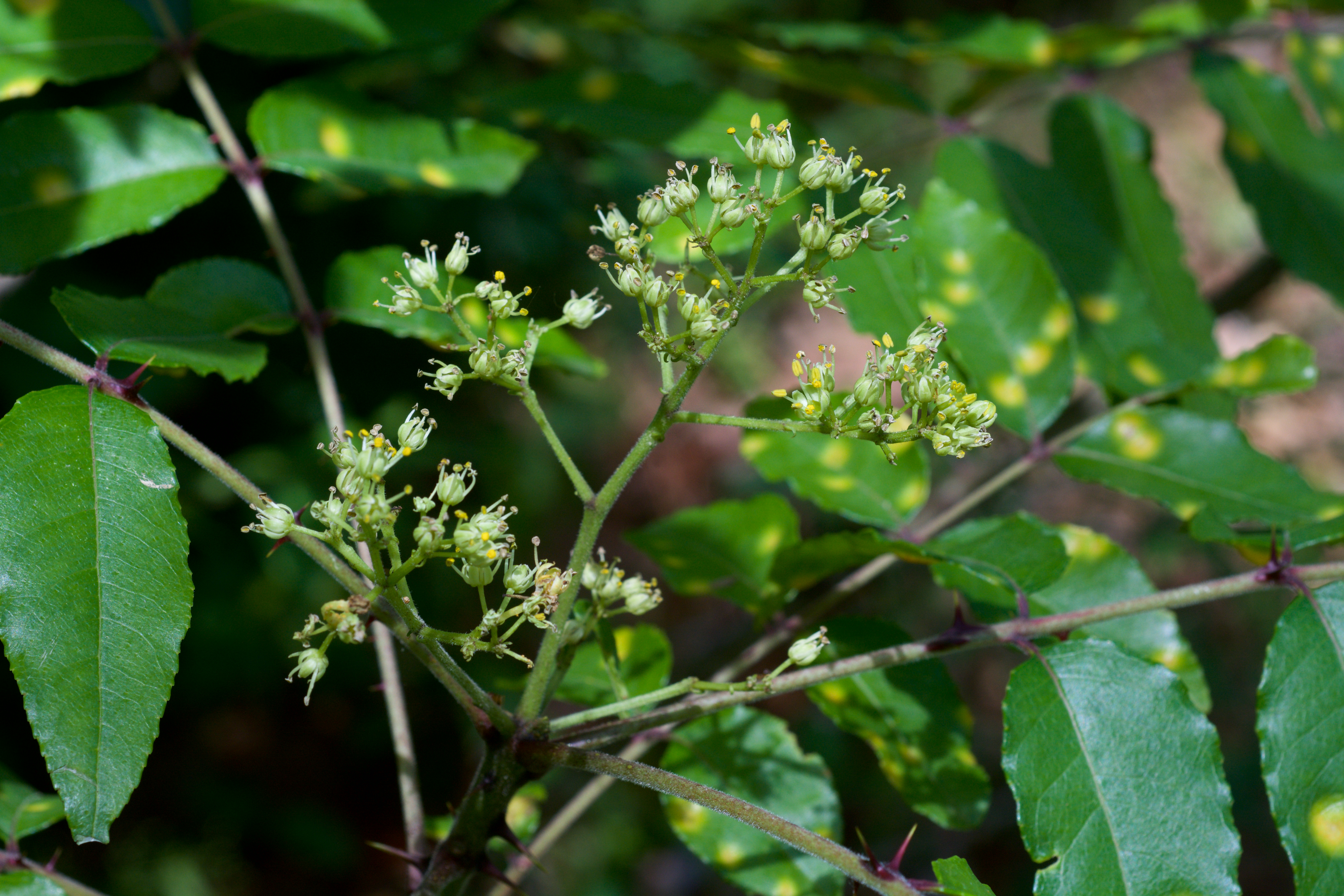
- Zanthoxylum clava-herculis (Hercules' club)

Conservation status
- Least Concern (IUCN 3.1)

Scientific classification
- Kingdom: Plantae
- Clade: Tracheophytes
- Clade: Angiosperms
- Clade: Eudicots
- Clade: Rosids
- Order: Sapindales
- Family: Rutaceae
- Genus: Zanthoxylum
- Species: Z. clava-herculis

Binomial name
- Zanthoxylum clava-herculis L.
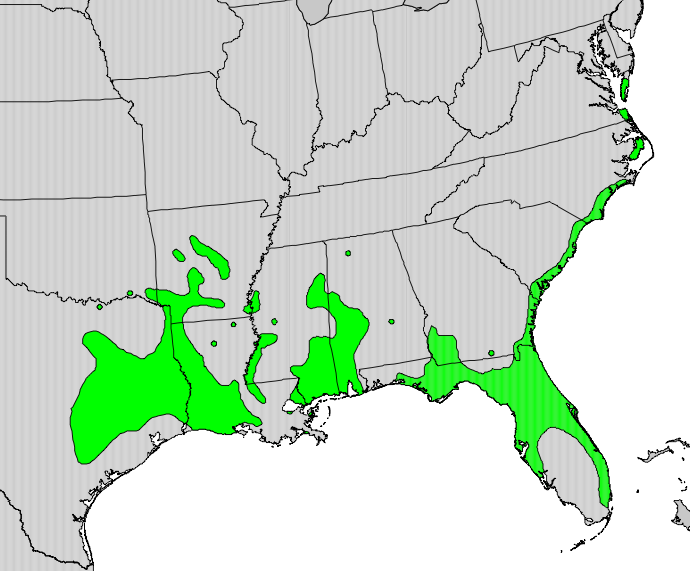

= Zanthoxylum clava-herculis =

Species of tree

Zanthoxylum clava-herculis, the Hercules' club, Hercules-club, pepperwood, or southern prickly ash, is a spiny tree or shrub native to the southeastern United States.

== Description ==
The tree grows to 10–17 m tall and has distinctive spined thick, corky lumps 2–3 cm long on the bark. The leaves are glabrous and leathery, pinnately compound, 20–30 cm long with 7-19 leaflets, each leaflet 4–5 cm long. The flowers are dioecious, in panicles up to 20 cm long, each flower small, 6–8 mm in diameter, with 3-5 white petals. The fruit is a two-valved capsule 6 mm in diameter with a rough surface, and containing several small black seeds. The tree has also been called Z. macrophyllum. The genus name is sometimes spelled Xanthoxylum.

== Common names and uses ==
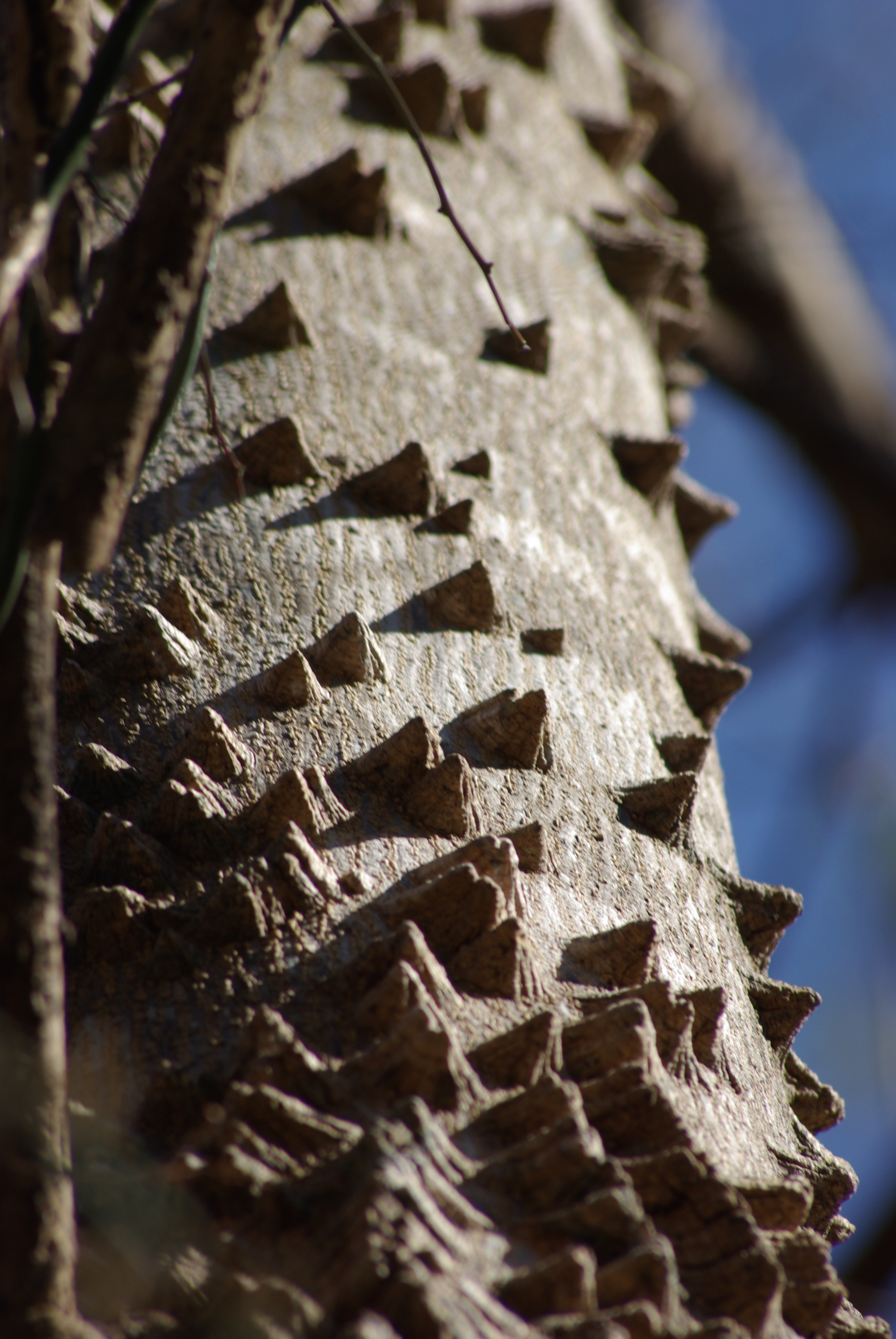
Hence "Hercules club"

Along with the related Zanthoxylum americanum, it is sometimes called "toothache tree" or "tingle tongue" because chewing on the leaves, bark, or twigs causes a tingling numbness of the mouth, tongue, teeth and gums. It was used for such medicinal purposes by both Native Americans and early settlers to treat toothache because of this.

== Habitats ==
The tree has a rounded crown and requires plentiful water and sunlight. Its leaves are browsed by deer and its fruit is eaten by birds. The fruit passes through birds, which helps the seeds to germinate. The new trees tend to sprout below the favorite resting places of the birds, along fence rows and the edge of woods. It is known to be host to a number of insect species, including the Giant Swallowtail (Papilio cresphontes) and the leaf beetle Derospidea brevicollis.

== Potentially confused species ==
The name Hercules' club is also applied to Aralia spinosa, also native to eastern North America. Unlike Zanthoxylum, Aralia has large, twice-compound leaves and very large leaf scars, so the trees are easily distinguished.

== Chemistry ==
The benzophenanthridine alkaloid chelerythrine is the major active natural product found in Z. clava-herculis, exhibiting anti-bacterial activity against Staphylococcus aureus.
