= Chelerythrine =

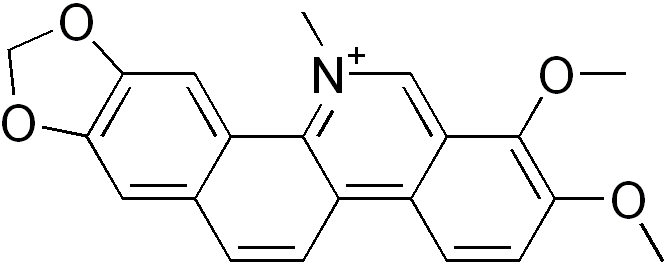

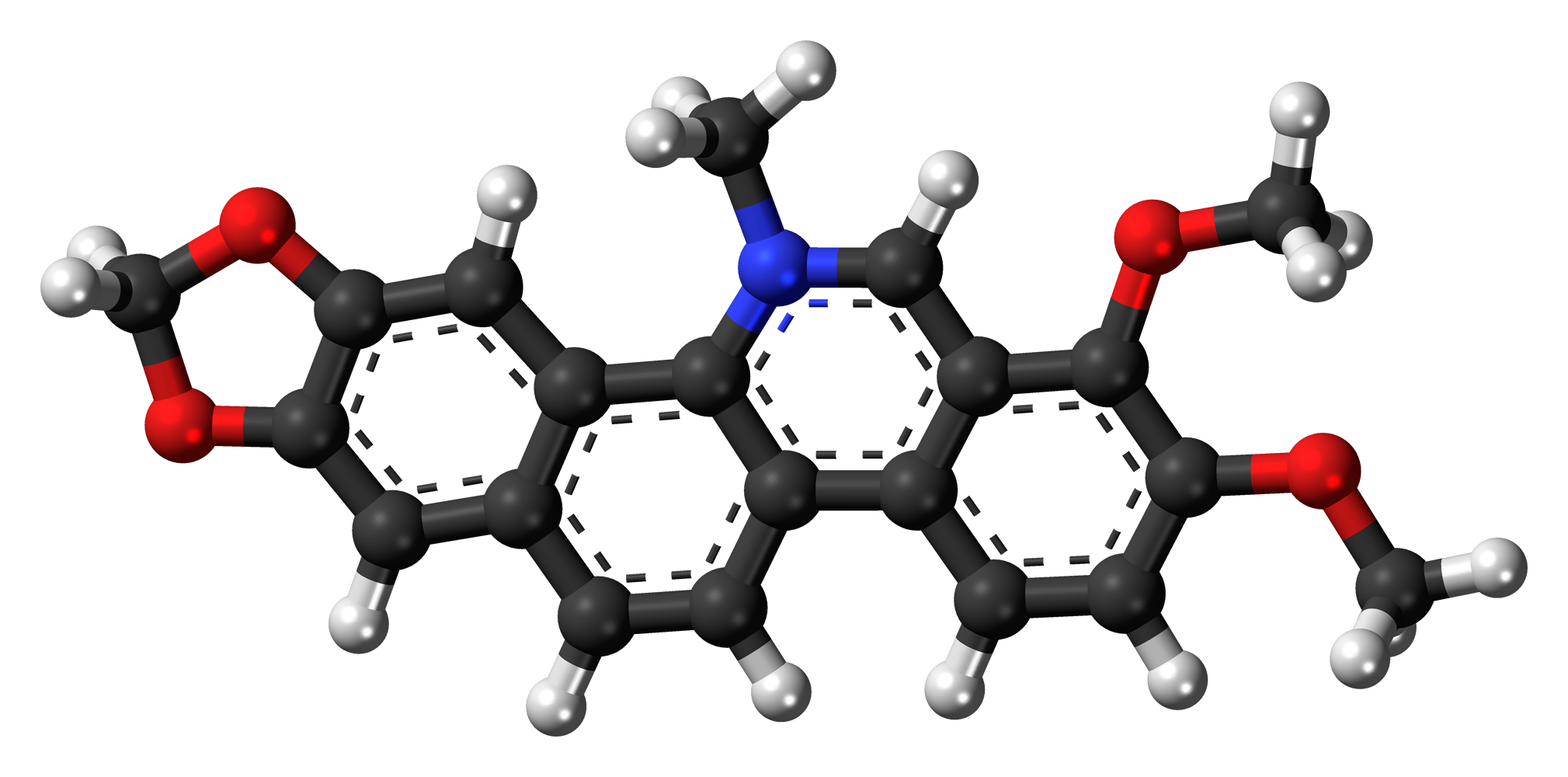

Names
- Preferred IUPAC name 1,2-Dimethoxy-12-methyl-9H-[1,3]benzodioxolo[5,6-c]phenanthridin-12-ium

Identifiers
CAS Number	34316-15-9; chloride: 3895-92-9
3D model (JSmol)	Interactive image; chloride: Interactive image
ChEBI	CHEBI:78373
ChEMBL	chloride: ChEMBL258893
ChemSpider	2602; chloride: 65262
ECHA InfoCard	100.047.194
EC Number	251-930-0; chloride: 223-444-9
IUPHAR/BPS	5953
KEGG	C12227
PubChem CID	2703; chloride: 72311
UNII	E3B045W6X0; chloride: 7IC98TZ0PZ
CompTox Dashboard (EPA)	DTXSID20861211
- InChI: InChI=1S/C21H18NO4/c1-22-10-16-13(6-7-17(23-2)21(16)24-3)14-5-4-12-8-18-19(26-11-25-18)9-15(12)20(14)22/h4-10H,11H2,1-3H3/q+1 Key: LLEJIEBFSOEYIV-UHFFFAOYSA-N; InChI=1/C21H18NO4/c1-22-10-16-13(6-7-17(23-2)21(16)24-3)14-5-4-12-8-18-19(26-11-25-18)9-15(12)20(14)22/h4-10H,11H2,1-3H3/q+1 Key: LLEJIEBFSOEYIV-UHFFFAOYAP; chloride: InChI=1S/C21H18NO4.ClH/c1-22-10-16-13(6-7-17(23-2)21(16)24-3)14-5-4-12-8-18-19(26-11-25-18)9-15(12)20(14)22;/h4-10H,11H2,1-3H3;1H/q+1;/p-1 Key: WEEFNMFMNMASJY-UHFFFAOYSA-M
- SMILES: O1c3c(OC1)cc2ccc4c5c(c[n+](c4c2c3)C)c(OC)c(OC)cc5; chloride: C[n+]1cc2c(ccc(c2OC)OC)c3c1c4cc5c(cc4cc3)OCO5.[Cl-]

Properties
Chemical formula	C_{21}H_{18}NO_{4}
Molar mass	348.378 g·mol^{−1}
- Except where otherwise noted, data are given for materials in their standard state (at 25 °C [77 °F], 100 kPa). verify (what is ?) Infobox references

Chelerythrine is a benzophenanthridine alkaloid present in the plant Chelidonium majus (greater celandine). It is a potent, selective, and cell-permeable protein kinase C inhibitor in vitro. And an efficacious antagonist of G-protein-coupled CB1 receptors. This molecule also exhibits anticancer qualities and it has served as a base for many potential novel drugs against cancer. Structurally, this molecule has two distinct conformations, one being a positively charged iminium form, and the other being an uncharged form, a pseudo-base.

It is also found in the plants Zanthoxylum clava-herculis and Zanthoxylum rhoifolium, exhibiting antibacterial activity against Staphylococcus aureus and other human pathogens.

== Research ==
=== Antibacterial agent ===
Chelerythrine is a potent antibacterial agent that has aided in dealing with the emergence of antibacterial resistant bacteria. This molecule has the ability to disrupt a bacteria's cell wall and cell membrane, as well as preventing bacterial growth, all of which contribute to bacterial death.

=== Cellular apoptosis ===
Studies have shown that chelerythrine inhibits SERCA activity, more importantly the concentration needed to inhibit this enzyme is within range to that needed to inhibit protein kinase C. The negative regulation of SERCA activity results in accumulation of calcium ions in the cytoplasm, leading to the forced influx of calcium ions to the mitochondria. High calcium ion concentration in the mitochondria greatly alters its normal activity and leads to apoptosis signaling, and eventually cellular destruction. Other cellular transporters, like the PMCA, have also been shown to be negatively regulated by chelerythrine, preventing PMCA to effectively take out calcium ions from inside the cell. This further contributes to the loss of calcium ion balance within the cell and eventual cell death. In triple-negative breast cancer cells, this molecule is found to induce apoptosis. Nuclear fragmentation and chromatin condensation is observed, which is indicative of apoptosis.

=== Other ===
Previous studies have showcased chelerythrine's ability to inhibit, or delay, cell proliferation, allowing it to be used to combat cancerous cells and promote cellular apoptosis, both in vivo and in vitro. However, further studies of this alkaloid have revealed that it has low selectivity and it can also promote cellular apoptosis of non-cancerous cells, thus displaying cytotoxic behavior. The creation of chelerythrine analogs have helped exploit this molecule's anticancer capabilities, while lessening its cytotoxic effects on non-cancerous cells. These novel analogs have been modified to have increased specificity for cancerous cells, thus decreasing cytotoxic effects and non-cancerous cell apoptosis.

=== Anti-cancer mechanisms ===
Depending on the form of cancer, chelerythrine can exhibit different effects on tumor cells, leading to inhibition of tumor growth. These mechanisms include inducing apoptosis, arrest of the cell cycle, promoting autophagy of cancerous cells, and the inhibition of telomerase. It has been found to be a possible anti-cancer agent for liver, gastric, breast, renal, and cervical cancers. Despite these claims, the related compound sanguinarine is associated with severe adverse effects. This is insufficient evidence to endorse the usage of chelerythrine present in botanical products as a cancer treatment.

=== Role as a protein kinase C inhibitor ===
Studies show that chelerythrine is a specific and potent protein kinase C inhibitor. Due to its inhibitory effects on protein kinase C, it has been found of use against triple-negative breast cancer. By inhibiting protein kinase C, signaling pathways are disrupted, inducing cell cycle arrest.
