= Nitidine =

Names
- Preferred IUPAC name 2,3-Dimethoxy-12-methyl-9H-[1,3]benzodioxolo[5,6-c]phenanthridin-12-ium

Identifiers
CAS Number	6872-57-7
3D model (JSmol)	Interactive image
ChEBI	CHEBI:7578
ChEMBL	ChEMBL176008
ChemSpider	4345
KEGG	C09595
PubChem CID	4501
UNII	933301178Z
CompTox Dashboard (EPA)	DTXSID60218846
- InChI: InChI=1S/C21H18NO4/c1-22-10-13-7-17(23-2)18(24-3)8-15(13)14-5-4-12-6-19-20(26-11-25-19)9-16(12)21(14)22/h4-10H,11H2,1-3H3/q+1 Key: KKMPSGJPCCJYRV-UHFFFAOYSA-N; InChI=1/C21H18NO4/c1-22-10-13-7-17(23-2)18(24-3)8-15(13)14-5-4-12-6-19-20(26-11-25-19)9-16(12)21(14)22/h4-10H,11H2,1-3H3/q+1 Key: KKMPSGJPCCJYRV-UHFFFAOYAL
- SMILES: C[N+]1=CC2=CC(=C(C=C2C3=C1C4=CC5=C(C=C4C=C3)OCO5)OC)OC

Properties
Chemical formula	C_{21}H_{18}NO_{4}^{+}
Molar mass	348.37 g/mol
- Except where otherwise noted, data are given for materials in their standard state (at 25 °C [77 °F], 100 kPa). Infobox references

Nitidine is a benzophenanthridine alkaloid found in species of the genus Zanthoxylum , notably in Zanthoxylum nitidum. This compound has an anti-malarial activity.
