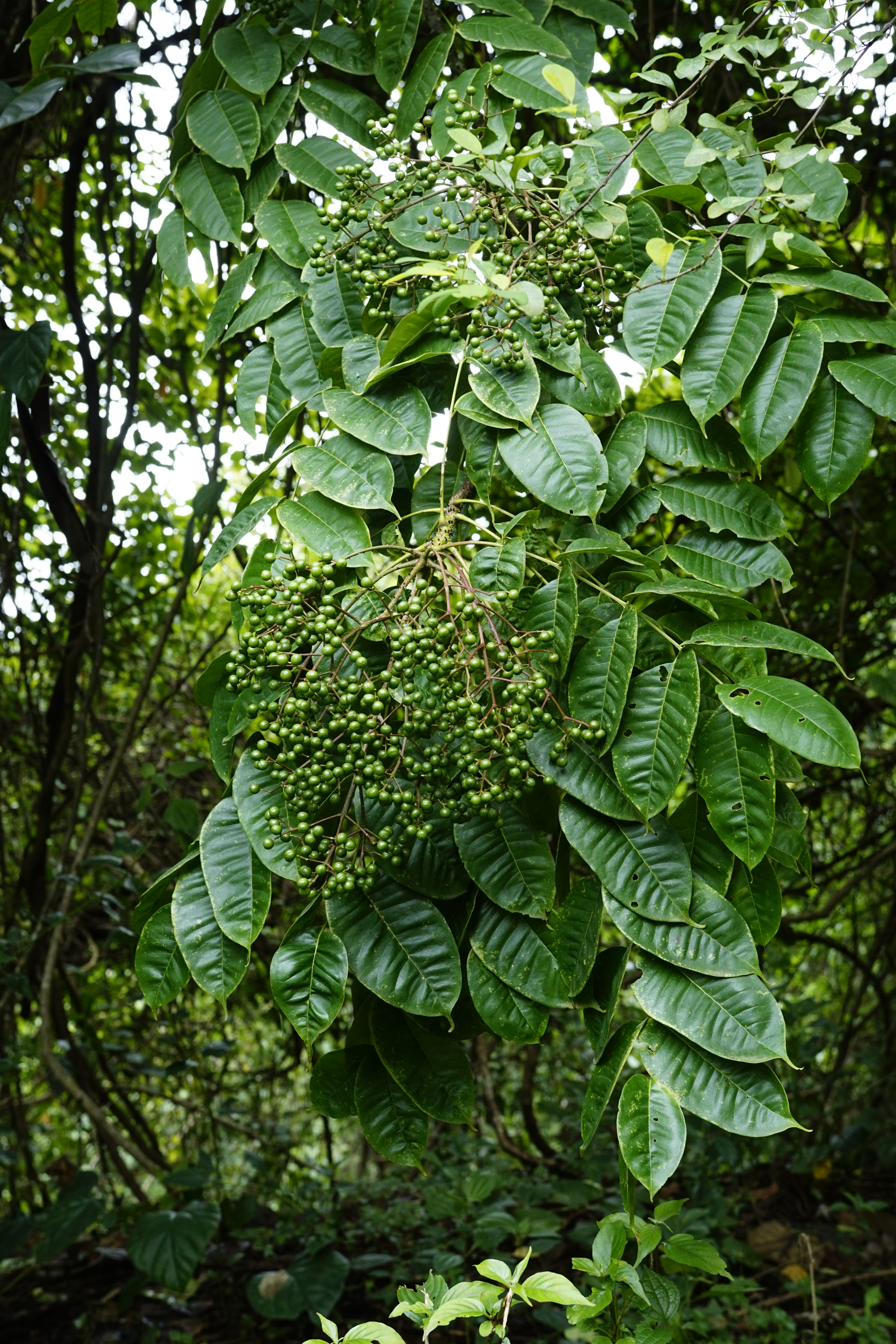

Conservation status
- Least Concern (IUCN 3.1)

Scientific classification
- Kingdom: Plantae
- Clade: Tracheophytes
- Clade: Angiosperms
- Clade: Eudicots
- Clade: Rosids
- Order: Sapindales
- Family: Rutaceae
- Genus: Zanthoxylum
- Species: Z. rhetsa

Binomial name
- Zanthoxylum rhetsa (Roxb.) DC.

Synonyms
- Fagara rhetsa Roxb.; Tipalia limonella Dennst. nom. inval., nom. nud.; Zanthoxylum limonella (Dennst.) Alston; Zanthoxylum limonelle W.E.Cooper orth. var.

= Zanthoxylum rhetsa =

Indian prickly ash

Species of flowering plant

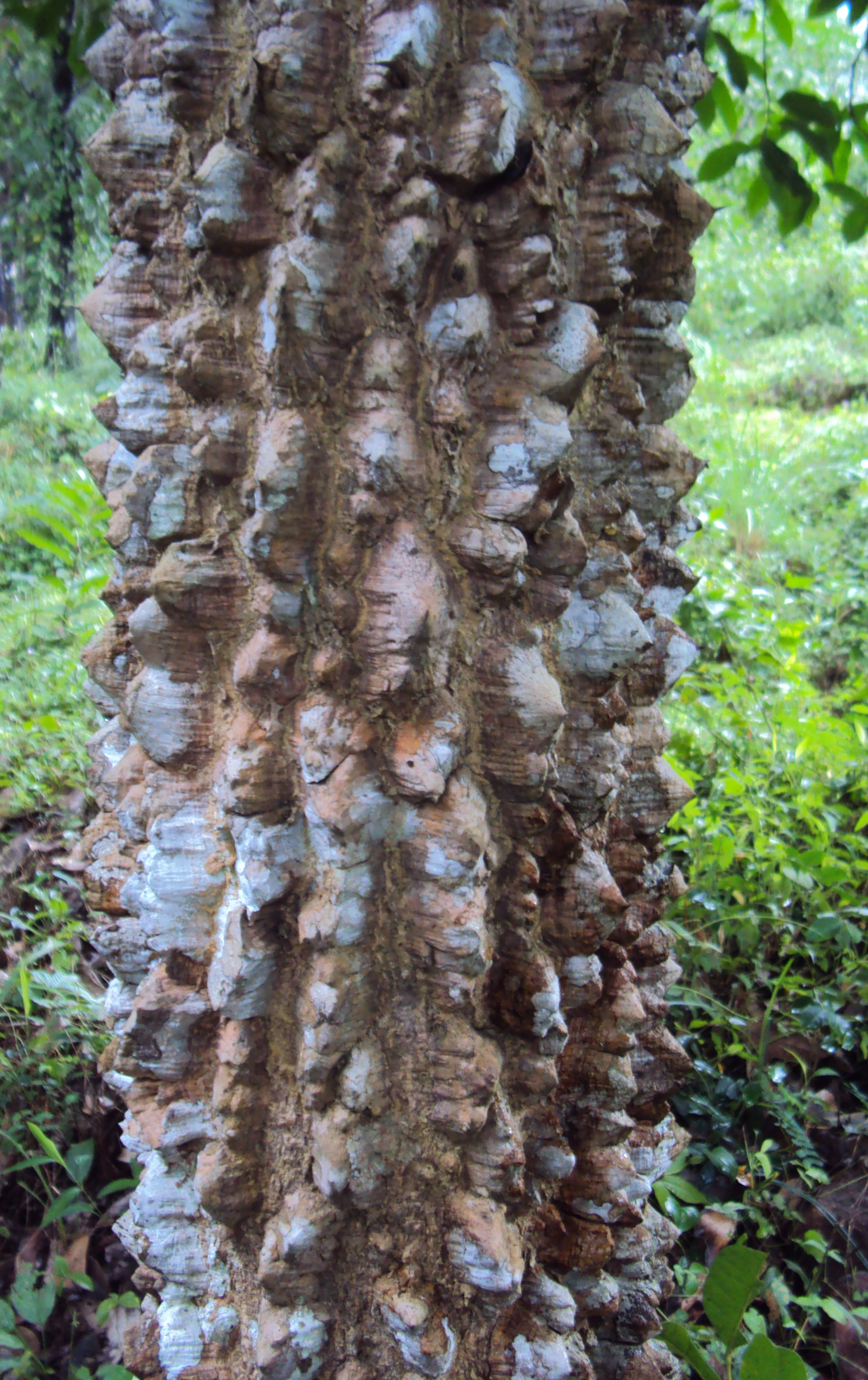
Bark

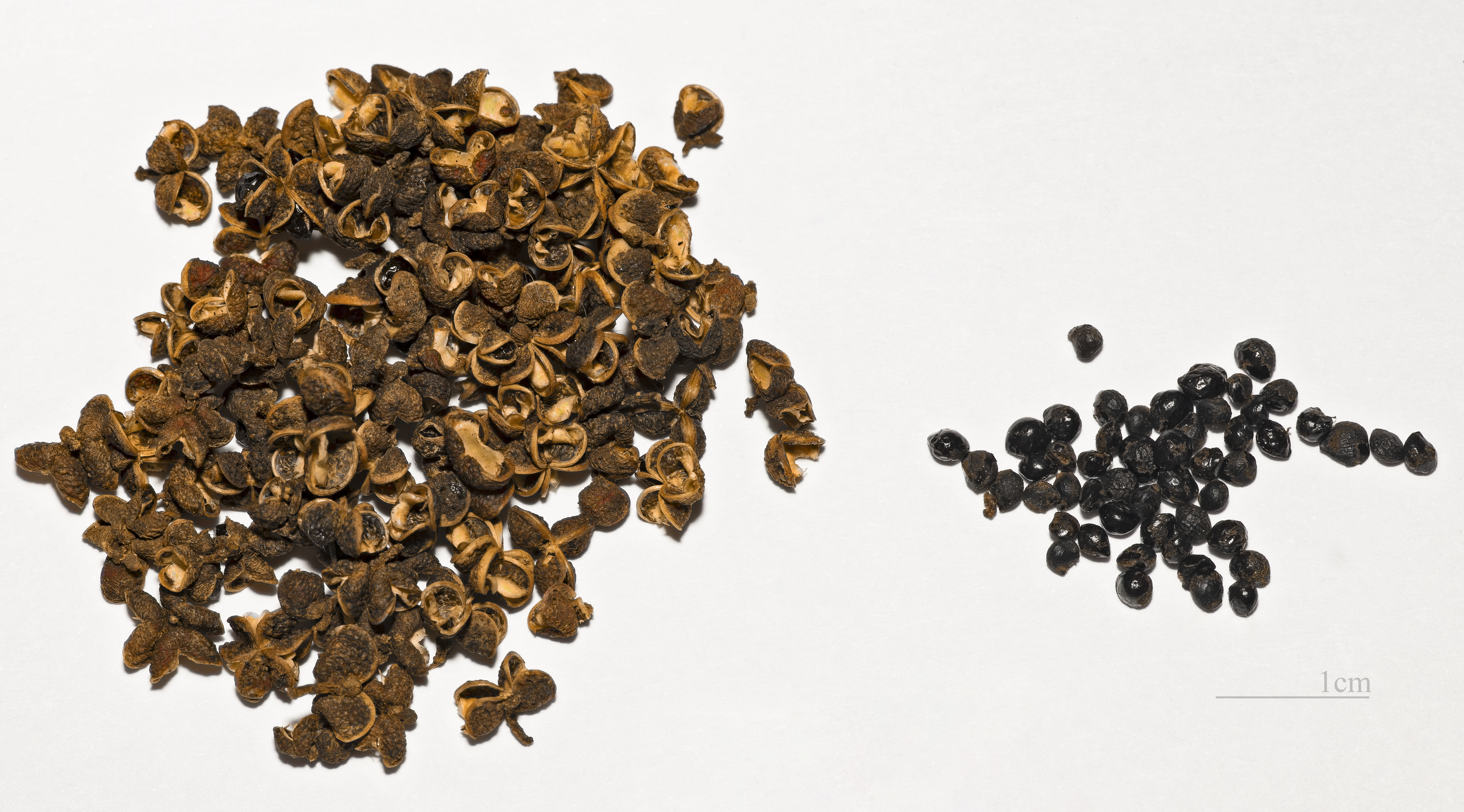
Dried fruits and seeds

Zanthoxylum rhetsa, commonly known as Indian prickly ash, is a species of flowering plant in the family Rutaceae and occurs from India east to the Philippines and south to northern Australia. It is a deciduous shrub or tree with cone-shaped spines on the stems, pinnate leaves with between nine and twenty-three leaflets, panicles of white or yellowish, male and female flowers, followed by spherical red, brown or black follicles.

== Description ==
Zanthoxylum rhetsa is a shrub or tree that sometimes grows to a height of 26 m (85 ft). The plant is sometimes deciduous and has stems with thick, cone-shaped spines on the older stems. The leaves are 140–230 mm (5.5–9.1 in) long and pinnate, with nine to twenty three egg-shaped to elliptical leaflets. The leaflets are 40–130 mm (1.6–5.1 in) long and 15–50 mm (0.59–1.97 in) wide, the side leaflets on petiolules 1–7 mm (0.039–0.276 in) long and the end leaflet on a petiolule 3–30 mm (0.12–1.18 in) long. The flowers are arranged on the ends of branchlets, sometimes also in leaf axils, in panicles up to 150 mm (5.9 in) long. Each flower is on a pedicel 1.5–6 mm (0.059–0.236 in) long, the four sepals joined at the base and 0.5–1 mm (0.020–0.039 in) long and the four petals white or yellowish white and 1–2 mm (0.039–0.079 in) long. Male flowers have stamens about 3 mm (0.12 in) long with a sterile carpel about 0.3 mm (0.012 in) long. Female flowers lack stamens and usually have a single carpel about 1.5 mm (0.059 in) long. Flowering occurs in summer and the fruit is a spherical red or brown to black follicle 6–7 mm (0.24–0.28 in) wide.

== Taxonomy ==
Indian prickly ash was first formally described in 1820 by William Roxburgh who gave it the name Fagara rhetsa in his book, Flora Indica. In 1824, de Candolle changed the name to Zanthoxylum rhetsa in his book Prodromus Systematis Naturalis Regni Vegetabilis.

Phylogenetics of related species

- - - - - - - Z. schinifolium
            - - Z. avicennae
              - Z. rhetsum
          - Z. myriacanthum
        - Z. ailanthoides
      - - - Z. kauaense
          - Z. hawaiiense
        - Z. dipetalum
    - - - - Z. dissitum
          - Z. scandens
        - Z. echinocarpum
      - Z. oxyphyllum
  - all other Zanthoxylum species

Cladogram of 12 most closely related species according to the Open Tree of Life.

== Distribution and habitat ==
Zanthoxylum rhetsa grows in rainforest and coastal thickets from sea level to an altitude of 200 m (660 ft), and is found in India, east to the Philippines and south to northern Australia. It occurs in the northern Kimberley in Western Australia, the northern coastal areas of the Northern Territory, Cape York Peninsula in Queensland and on Gabba and Moa Islands in the Torres Strait.

== Uses ==
The people of Goa, the Konkan and Kanara coasts, and Coorg use the woody pericarp of the tiny fruits as a spice, particularly with seafood dishes. The spice is known as "teppal" in Konkani.

In the Northwest region of Vietnam, the spice is known as "mắc khén" and is used particularly by people of the Muong ethnic minority on grilled meats and in dipping sauces.

The spice contains a chemical ingredient, sanshool, a local anesthetic that causes a tingling sensation on the tongue. Sanshool is also the main principle of Sichuan Pepper, which comes from the related species Zanthoxylum bungeanum and the Japanese/Korean pepper Zanthoxylum piperitum. Many butterflies, including Papilio buddha and Papilio helenus, use this as a host plant.

== See also ==
- Sichuan pepper
