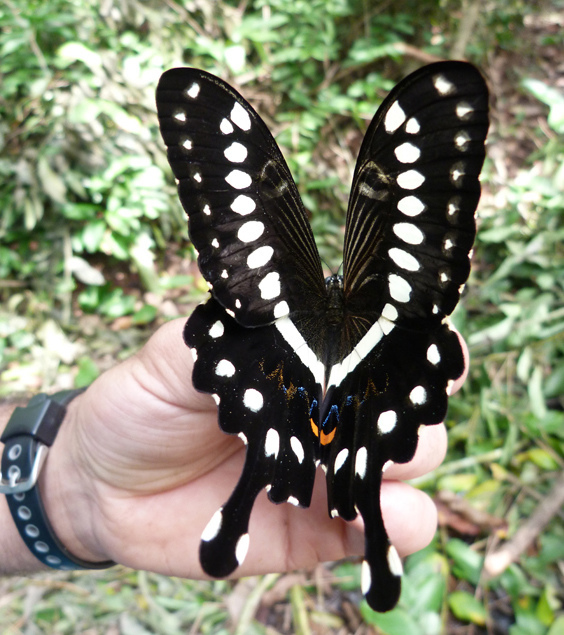

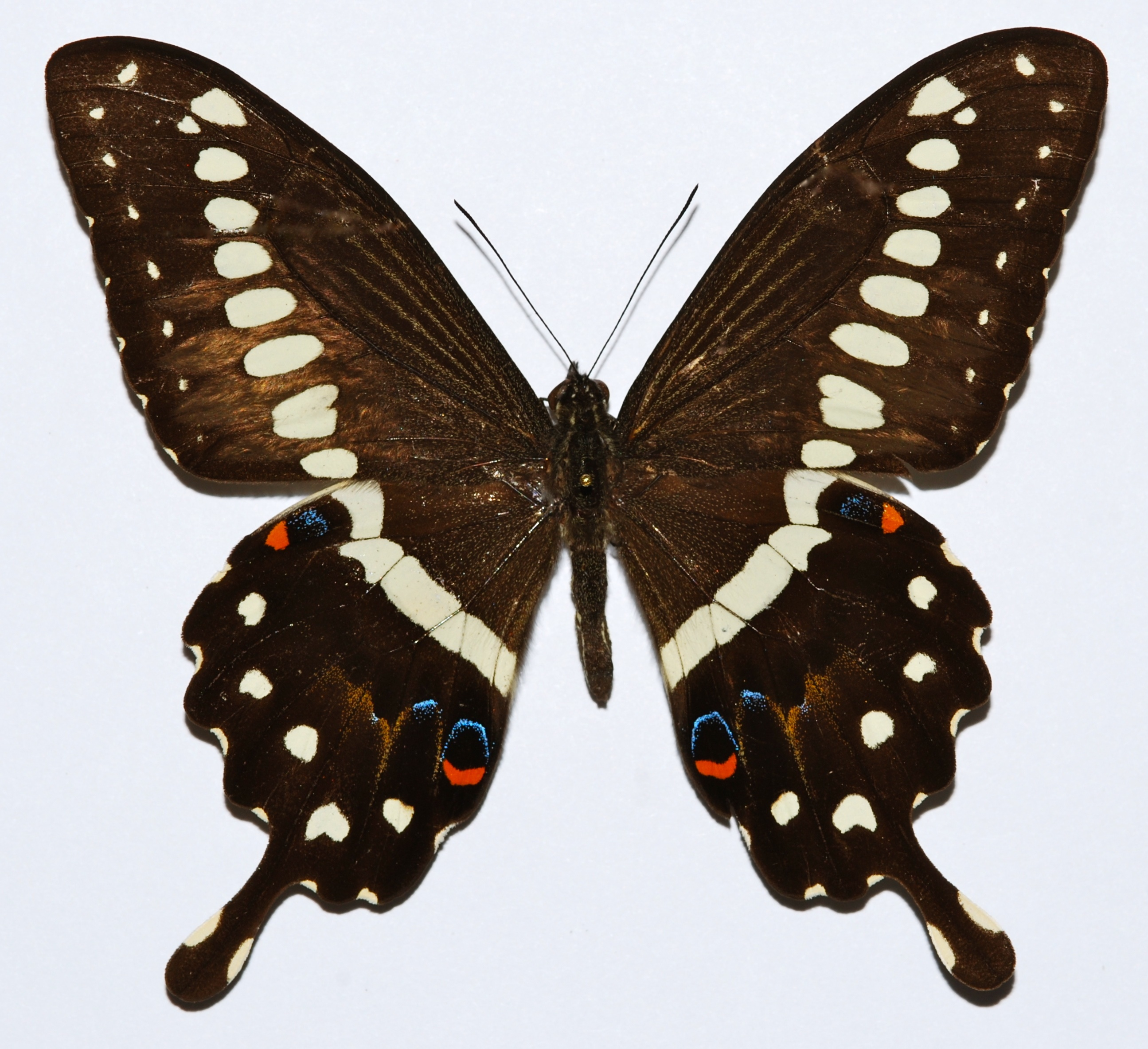

Scientific classification
- Kingdom: Animalia
- Phylum: Arthropoda
- Clade: Pancrustacea
- Class: Insecta
- Order: Lepidoptera
- Family: Papilionidae
- Genus: Papilio
- Species: P. lormieri

Binomial name
- Papilio lormieri Distant, 1874

Synonyms
- Papilio menestheus v. lormieri ab. bassana Strand, 1913; Papilio menestheus var. aureus Moreau, 1917; Papilio menestheus lormieri ab. cuvelieri Dufrane, 1946; Papilio menestheus-lormieri semlikana Le Cerf, 1924; Papilio lormieri neocrocea Koçak, 1983; Papilio lormieri f. ophidicephaloides Stoneham, 1951; Papilio lormieri f. rufopunctata Stoneham, 1951; Papilio lormieri crocea Storace, 1955

= Papilio lormieri =

Species of butterfly

Papilio lormieri, the central emperor swallowtail, is a species of swallowtail butterfly from the genus Papilio that is found in Cameroon, the Republic of the Congo, Angola, South Sudan, Uganda, Tanzania, and Kenya.

The larvae feed on Clausena anisata, Fagaropsis species, Rutaceae species, and Fagara macrophylla.

== Taxonomy ==
Papilio lormieri is a member of the menestheus species group. The members of the clade are:

- Papilio menestheus Drury, 1773
- Papilio lormieri Distant, 1874
- Papilio ophidicephalus Oberthür, 1878

== Subspecies ==
- Papilio lormieri lormieri (Cameroon, Congo Republic, northern Angola, south-western Sudan)
- Papilio lormieri semlikana Le Cerf, 1924 (north-eastern Congo Republic, western Uganda, north-western Tanzania)
- Papilio lormieri neocrocea Koçak, 1983 (eastern and central Uganda, western Kenya) - Lormier's swallowtail
