= Green pepper =

Green pepper can refer to:

- Green examples of fruits of the species Capsicum annuum, called a bell pepper in North America, simply a pepper in the United Kingdom and Ireland, and a capsicum in India, Australia, and New Zealand
- Chili pepper, a hot pepper, some of which are green
- Zanthoxylum armatum, rattan pepper
- Dried or pickled unripe fruit of Piper nigrum
