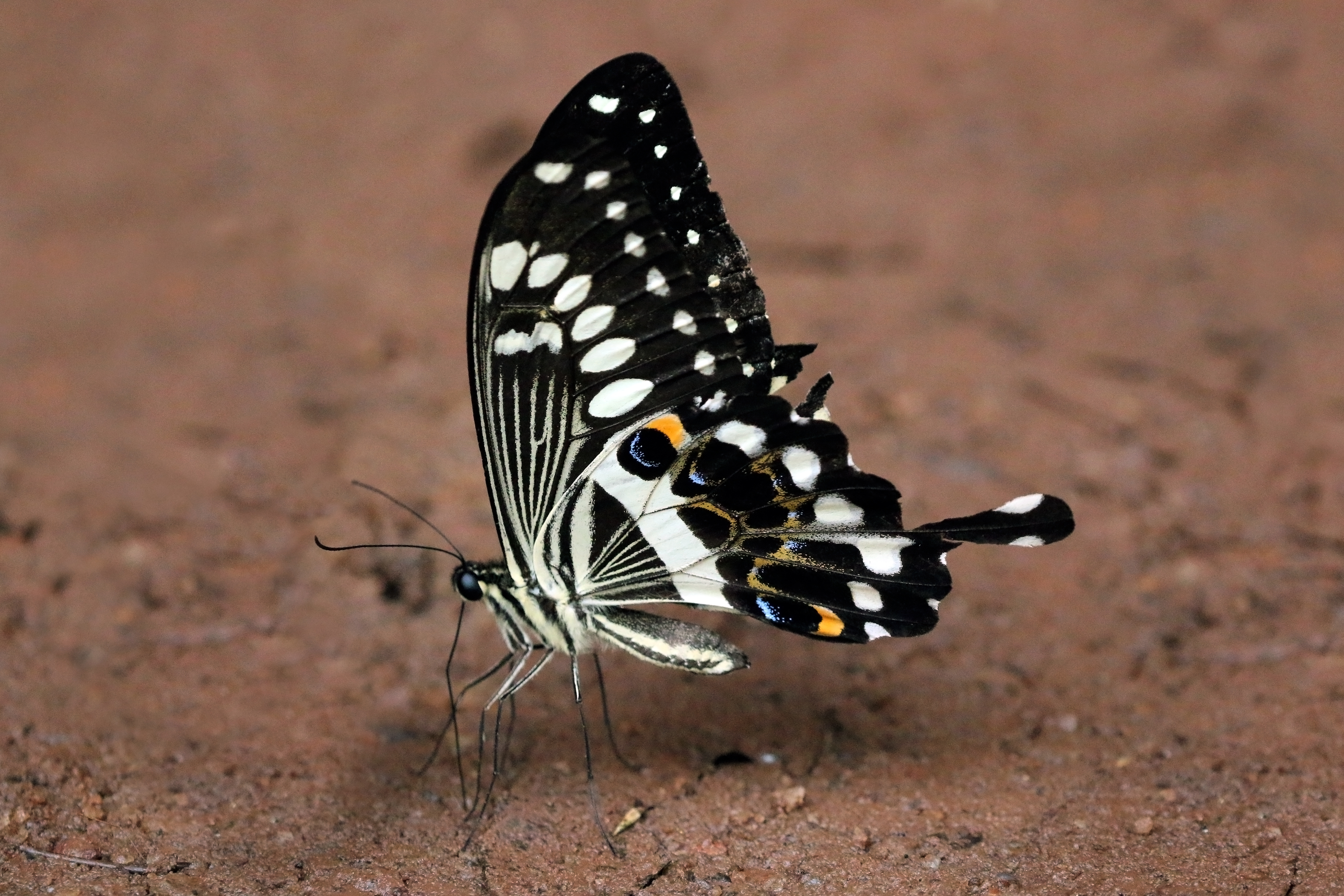
- in the Bobiri Forest, Ghana

Scientific classification
- Kingdom: Animalia
- Phylum: Arthropoda
- Clade: Pancrustacea
- Class: Insecta
- Order: Lepidoptera
- Family: Papilionidae
- Genus: Papilio
- Species: P. menestheus

Binomial name
- Papilio menestheus Drury, 1773

Synonyms
- Papilio menestheus ab. pygmaeus Aurivillius, 1899; Papilio menestheus ab. unimaculatus Strand, 1914; Papilio menestheus v. lormieri ab. latefasciatus Schultze, 1917

= Papilio menestheus =

Species of butterfly

Papilio menestheus, the western emperor swallowtail, is a species of swallowtail butterfly from the genus Papilio that is found in Senegal, Guinea-Bissau, Guinea, Sierra Leone, Liberia Ivory Coast, Ghana, Togo, Nigeria, Cameroon and Equatorial Guinea.

The larvae feed on Citrus species and Fagara macrophylla.

== Taxonomy ==
Papilio menestheus is the nominal member of the menestheus species group. The members of the clade are:

- Papilio menestheus Drury, 1773
- Papilio lormieri Distant, 1874
- Papilio ophidicephalus Oberthür, 1878

== Subspecies ==
- Papilio menestheus menestheus (Senegal, Guinea-Bissau, Guinea, Sierra Leone, Liberia, Ivory Coast, Ghana, Togo, Nigeria, western Cameroon)
- Papilio menestheus canui Gauthier, 1984 (Equatorial Guinea)

Torben Larsen developed a species numbering system for his 2005 publication Butterflies of West Africa. The nominate subspecies is #12. The 'Larsen' numbers have since been used with permission in A Sharp Eye on Butterflies of Ghana.
