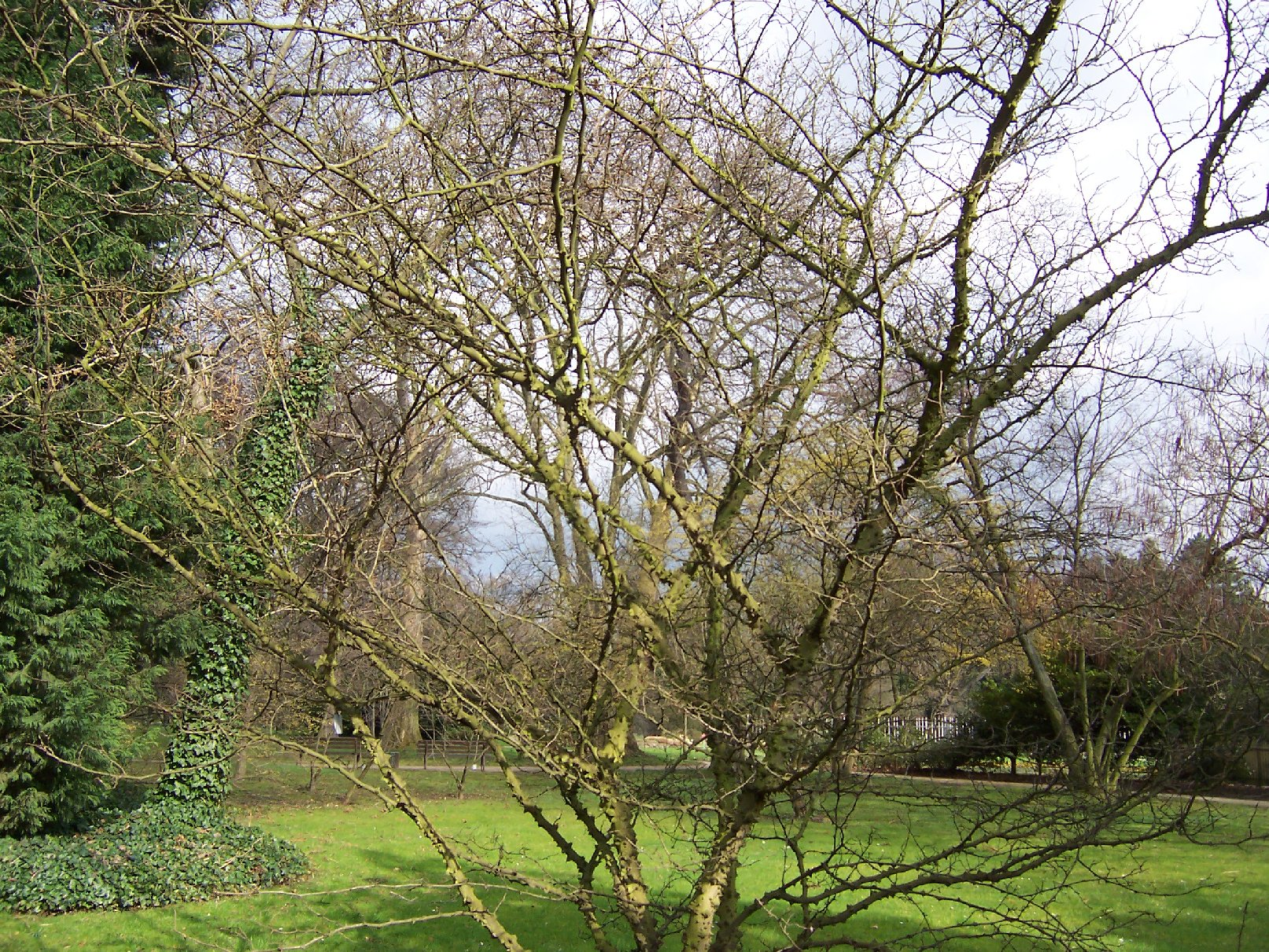
- Habitus of leafless plant

Scientific classification
- Kingdom: Plantae
- Clade: Tracheophytes
- Clade: Angiosperms
- Clade: Eudicots
- Clade: Rosids
- Order: Sapindales
- Family: Rutaceae
- Genus: Zanthoxylum
- Species: Z. simulans

Binomial name
- Zanthoxylum simulans Hance

Subspecies
- Zanthoxylum simulans subsp. calcareum Z.H.Chen, Feng Chen & W.Zhu; Zanthoxylum simulans subsp. simulans

Synonyms
- Zanthoxylum bungei; Zanthoxylum coreanum

= Zanthoxylum simulans =

Species of flowering plant

Zanthoxylum simulans, the Chinese-pepper, Chinese prickly-ash or flatspine prickly-ash, is a flowering plant in the family Rutaceae, native to southern and central China, Taiwan, and South Korea. It is one of several species of Zanthoxylum from which Sichuan pepper is produced.

It is a spreading shrub or small tree growing to 7 m tall. The leaves are 7–12.5 cm long, pinnate, with 7–11 leaflets, the leaflets 3–5 cm long and 1.5–2 cm broad. There are numerous short (3–6 mm) spines on both the stems and the leaf petioles, and large (several cm) knobs on the branches. The flowers are produced in slender cymes, each flower about 4–5 mm diameter. The 3–4 mm berry has a rough reddish brown shell that splits open to release the black seeds from inside.

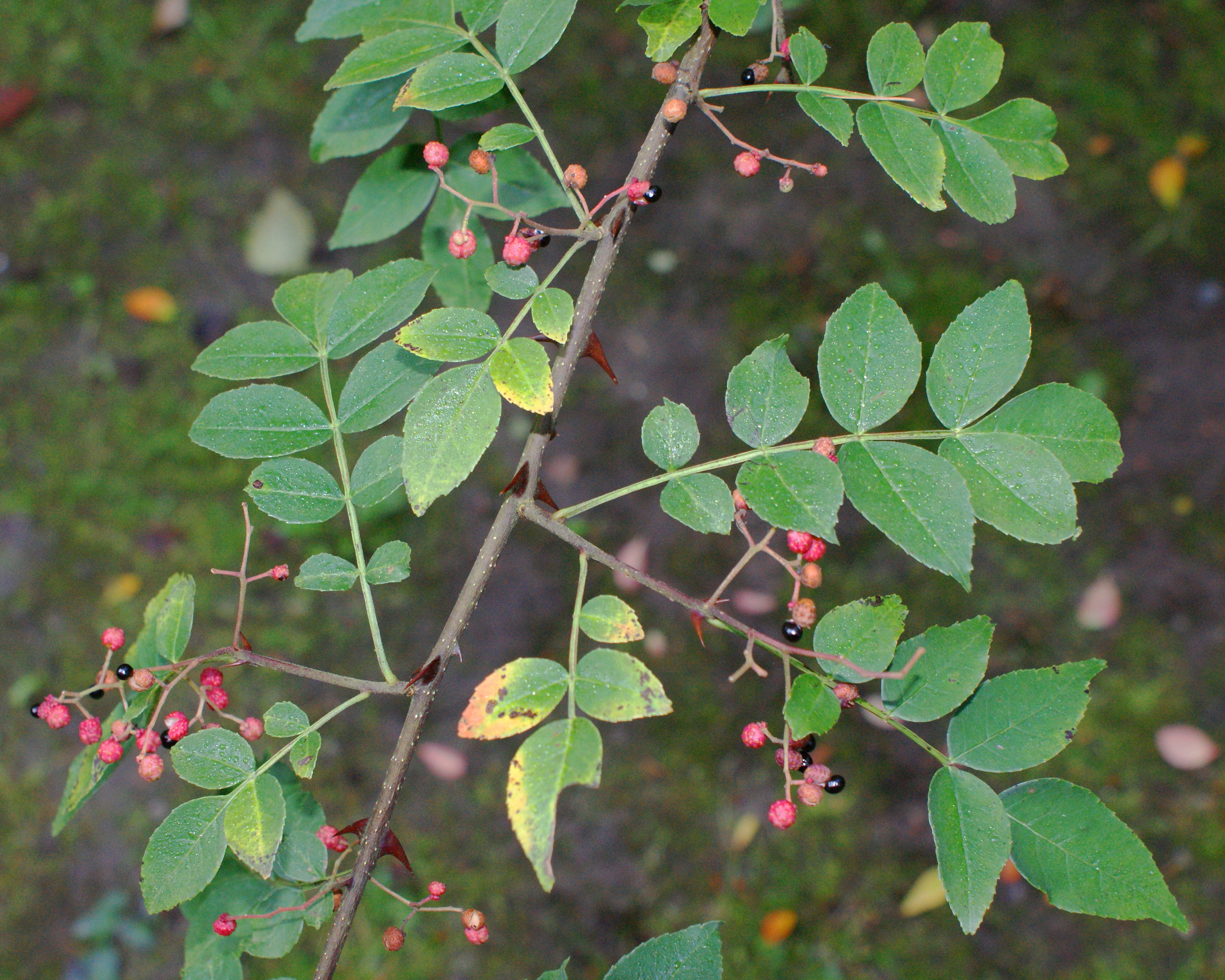
Leaves and fruit

== Subspecies ==
Two subspecies are accepted.

- Zanthoxylum simulans subsp. calcareum Z.H.Chen, Feng Chen & W.Zhu – Zhejiang
- Zanthoxylum simulans subsp. simulans – central and southern China, South Korea, and Taiwan

== Aromatic composition ==
- 1,8-Cineole, α-Terpineol, Geraniol, Limonene, Linalool, Myrcene.

== Notes and references ==
- Flora of Taiwan, volume 3 pages 541, 542 and 543
- NC State University fact sheet
