= Sichuan pepper =

Chinese spice

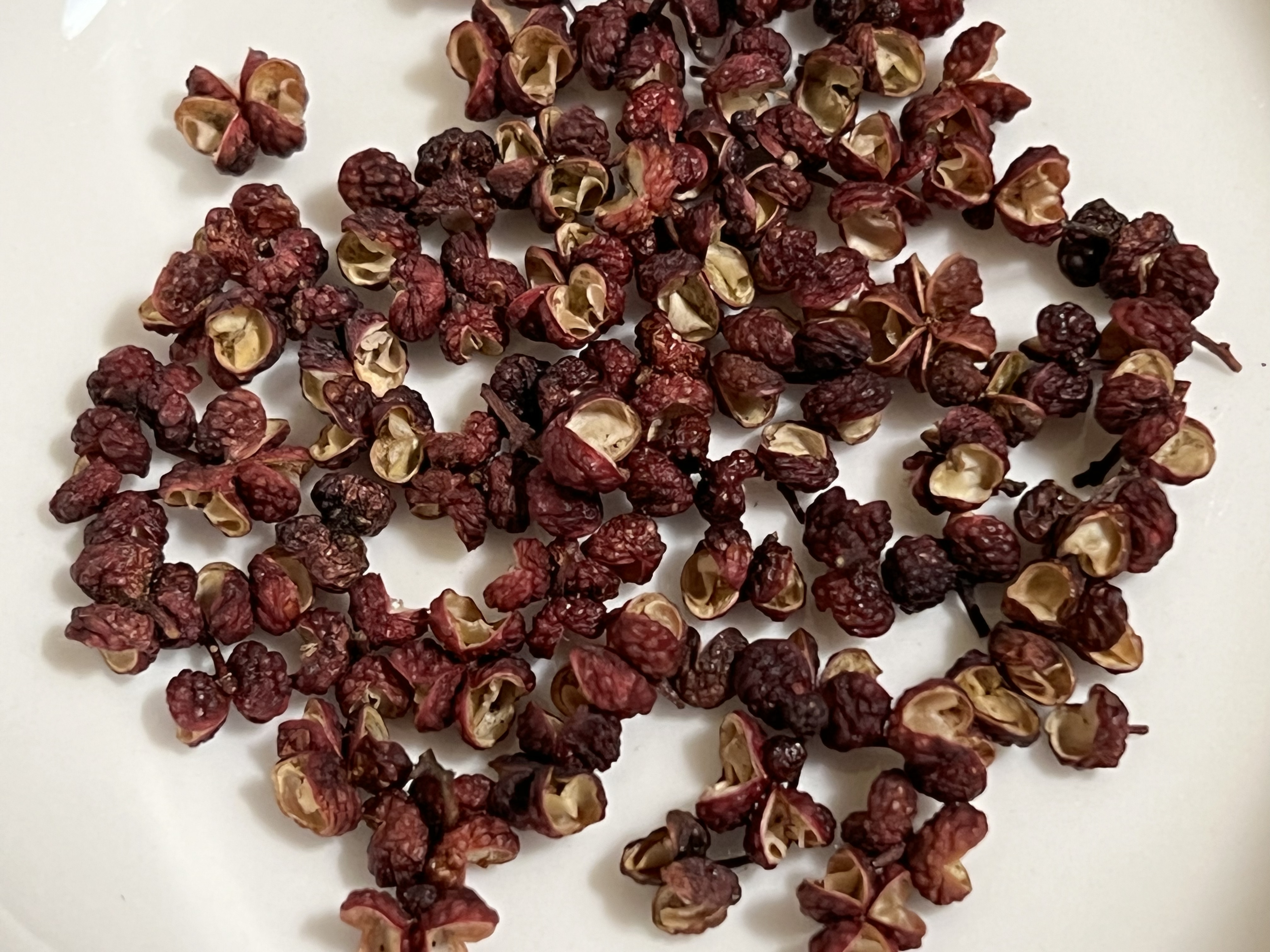
- Chinese: 花椒
Transcriptions
Standard Mandarin
- Hanyu Pinyin: huājiāo
- Wade–Giles: hua^{1}-chiao^{1}
- IPA: [xwá.tɕjáʊ]
Yue: Cantonese
- Yale Romanization: fāa-jīu
- Jyutping: faa^{1}-ziu^{1}
- IPA: [fa˥ tsiw˥]
Southern Min
- Hokkien POJ: hoa-chio
- Tâi-lô: hua-tsio

Sichuan pepper (Chinese: 花椒; pinyin: huājiāo) (Note: also known as Sichuanese pepper, Szechuan pepper, Chinese prickly ash, Chinese pepper, Mountain pepper, and mala pepper, historically known as fagara) is a spice made from the dried pericarp (outer shell of the fruit) of a plant of the genus Zanthoxylum in the family Rutaceae. It is commonly used in Sichuan cuisine of China and in the cuisines of the Himalayas. Despite its name, Sichuan pepper is not closely related to black pepper or chili pepper. Instead, Zanthoxylum plants are in the same family as citrus and rue.

When eaten, Sichuan pepper produces a tingling, numbing effect due to the presence of hydroxy-alpha sanshool. It is used in Sichuan dishes such as mapo doufu, Kung Pao chicken and Chongqing hot pot, and is often added to chili peppers to create a flavor known as málà (Chinese: 麻辣; 'numb-spiciness').

== Species and cultivars ==
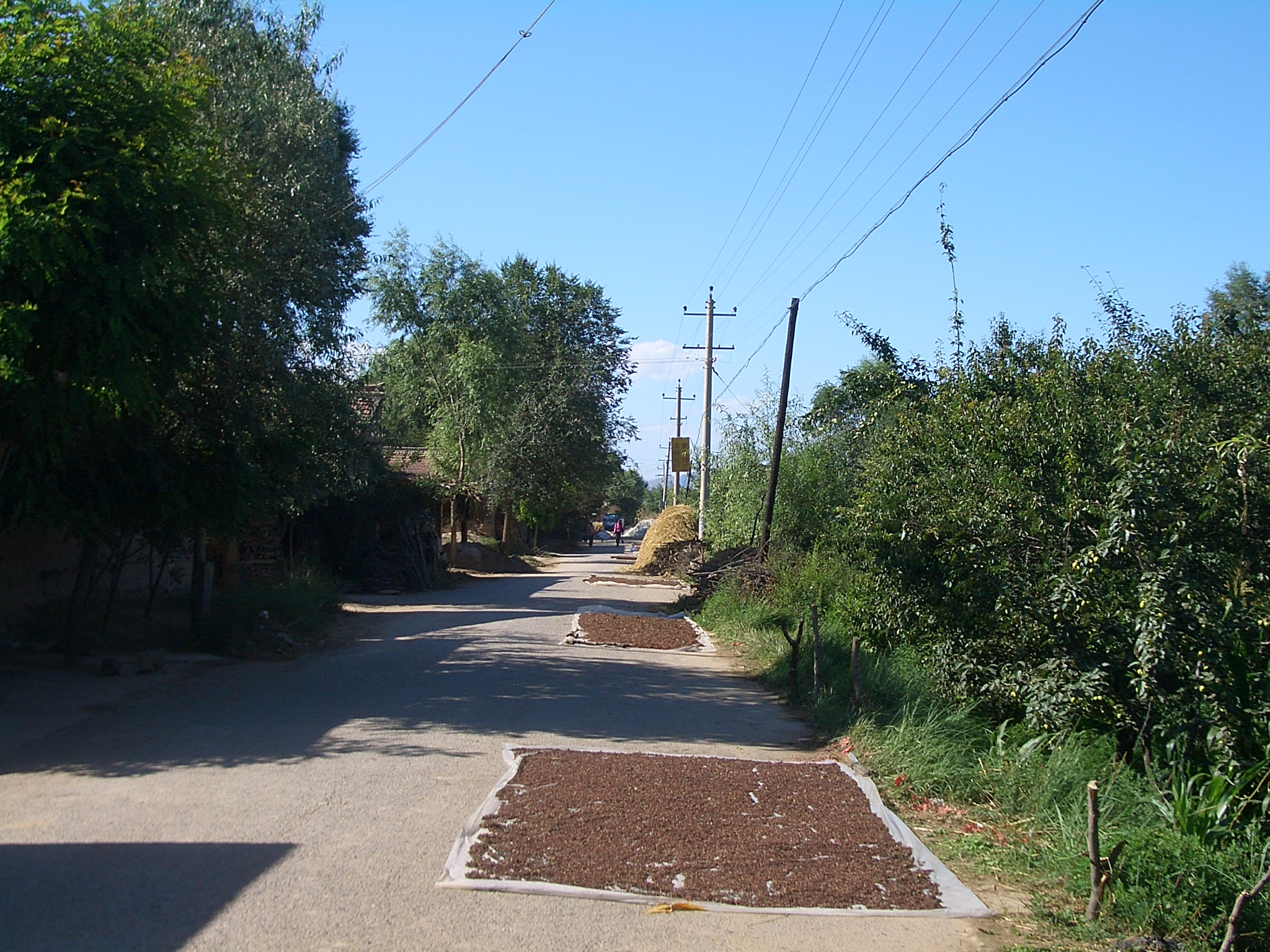
Newly harvested Sichuan pepper (known locally as 大红袍花椒, dà hóng páo huā jiāo "big red coat huajiao"), left out to dry in the sun, Linxia County, Gansu Province, in Northwest China

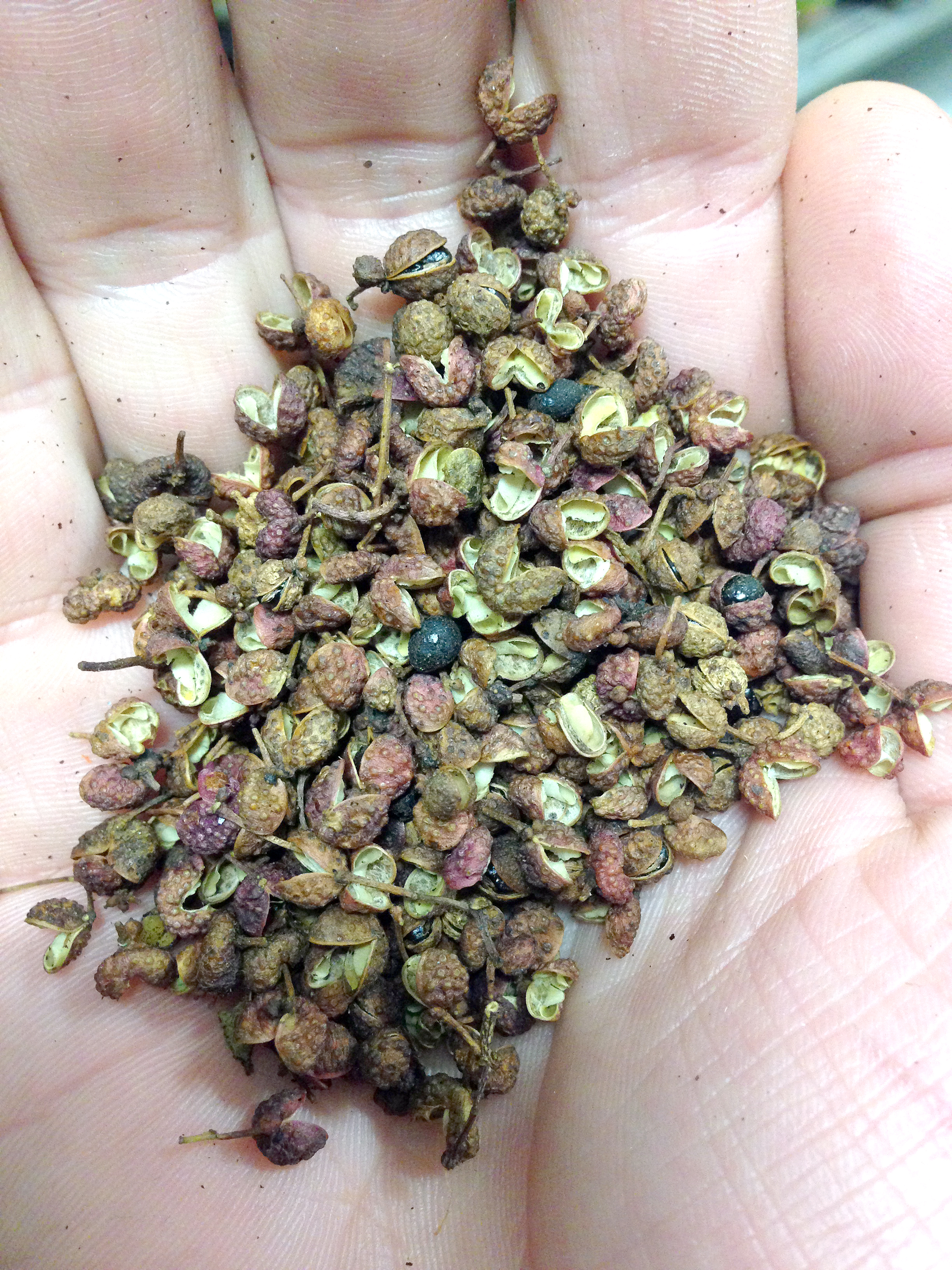
A handful of green Sichuan peppercorn

Sichuan peppers have been used for culinary and medicinal purposes in China for centuries with numerous Zanthoxylum species called huājiāo. Commonly used sichuan peppers in China include:

Commonly cultivated Sichuan pepper species and types
Species	Species common name in Chinese	Fruit common name in Chinese	Characteristics
Zanthoxylum bungeanum	Chinese: 花椒; pinyin: huājiāo	Chinese: 红花椒; pinyin: hóng huājiāo; lit. 'red huajiao'	Red, more pungent
Zanthoxylum schinifolium	Chinese: 青花椒; pinyin: qīnghuājiāo; lit. 'green huajiao'	Chinese: 青花椒; pinyin: qīnghuājiāo; lit. 'green huajiao'	Green, less pungent, more numbing
Zanthoxylum armatum	Chinese: 竹叶花椒; pinyin: zhúyè huājiāo; lit. 'bamboo-leaf huajiao'	Fresh: Chinese: 藤椒; pinyin: téngjiāo; lit. 'vine jiao' Dry: Chinese: 麻椒; pinyin: májiāo; lit. 'numb jiao'	Green, less pungent, fragrant (when fresh), more numbing (when dried)

Less commonly cultivated species found in China include:

- Zanthoxylum simulans Chinese: 野花椒; pinyin: yě huājiāo (red fruit)
- For a full list, consult Flora Reipublicae Popularis Sinicae, which lists scientific binomials, accepted common names among Chinese scholars, and local vernacular names.

Over the years, Chinese farmers have cultivated multiple strains of Z. bungeanum and Z. schinifolium.

Zanthoxylum armatum is found throughout the Himalayas, from Kashmir to Bhutan, as well as in Taiwan, Nepal, China, Philippines, Malaysia, Japan, and Pakistan, and is known by a variety of regional names, including timur (टिमुर) in Nepali and Hindko, yer ma (གཡེར་མ་) in Khams Tibetan and thingye (ཐིང༌ངེ༌) in Bhutan.

=== Other Zanthoxylum spices ===
Zanthoxylum gilletii is an African species of Zanthoxylum used to produce spice uzazi. Similarly, other Zanthoxylum species are harvested for spice and seasoning production in a number of cultures and culinary traditions. These spices include andaliman, chopi, sancho, sanshō, teppal, and tirphal.

Zanthoxylum oxyphyllum, known as mejenga, is used as a herb in Assam, India.

== Culinary uses ==
Sichuan pepper is an important spice in Chinese, Nepali, Kashmiri, north east Indian, Tibetan, and Bhutanese cookery of the Himalayas. Sichuan pepper has a citrus-like flavor and induces a tingling numbness in the mouth, akin to a 50-hertz vibration (typical of RA1 mechanical vibrotactile sensors in humans), due to the presence of hydroxy-alpha sanshool. Food historian Harold McGee describes the effect of sanshools thus:

"...they produce a strange, tingling, buzzing, numbing sensation that is something like the effect of carbonated drinks or of a mild electric current (touching the terminals of a nine-volt battery to the tongue). Sanshools appear to act on several different kinds of nerve endings at once, induce sensitivity to touch and cold in nerves that are ordinarily nonsensitive, and so perhaps cause a kind of general neurological confusion."

=== Chinese cuisine ===
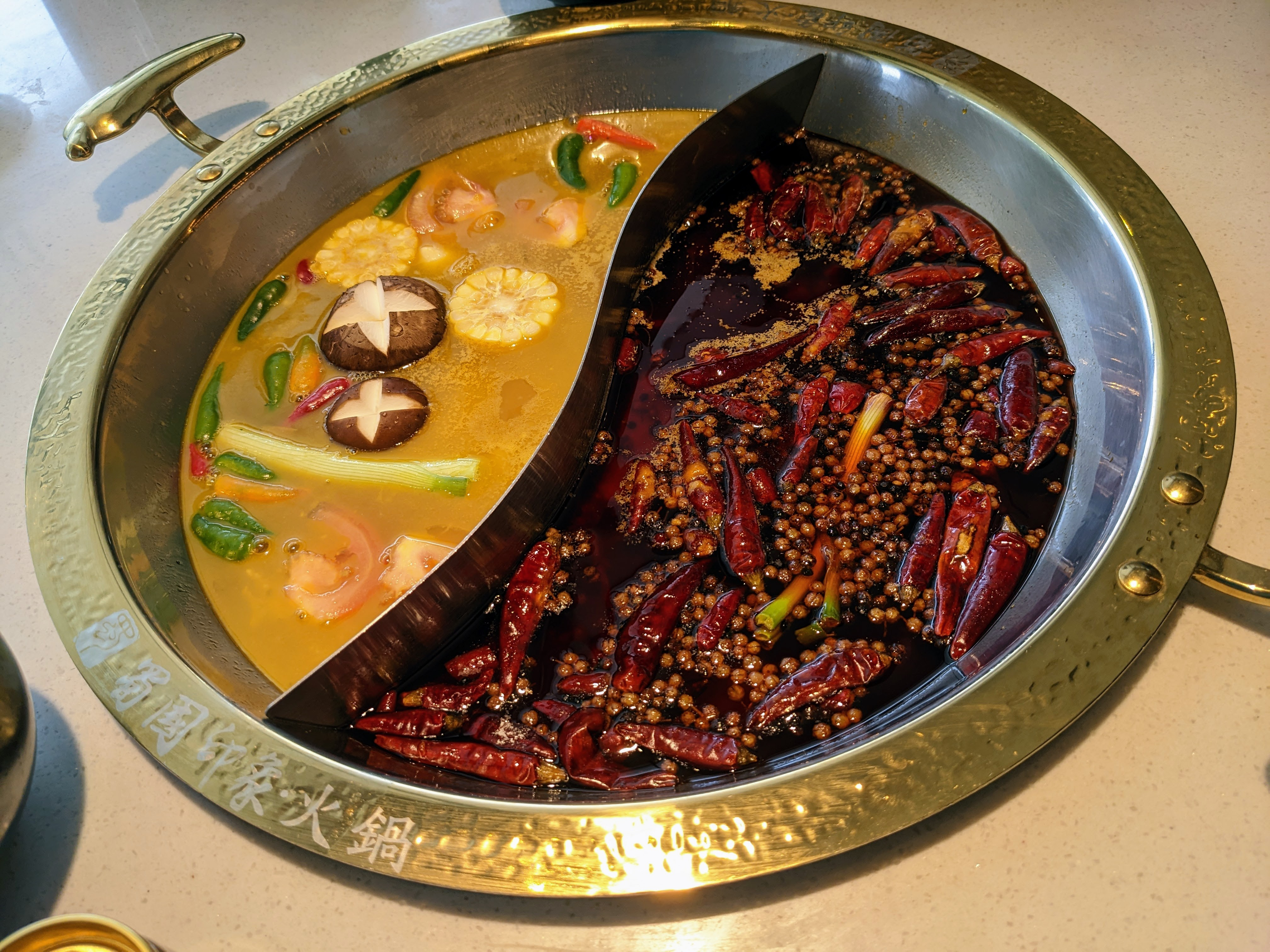
Chengdu-style mala hotpot with heavy use of Sichuan pepper

Whole, green, freshly picked Sichuan pepper may be used in cooking, but dried Sichuan pepper is more commonly used. Once dried, the shiny black seeds inside the husk are discarded, along with any stems; the husk is what we know as Sichuan pepper or peppercorn.

The peppercorn may be used whole or finely ground, as it is in five-spice powder. Mala sauce (Chinese: 麻辣; pinyin: málà; lit. 'numbing and spicy'), common in Sichuan cooking, is a combination of Sichuan pepper and chili pepper, and it is a key ingredient in Chongqing hot pot.

Sichuan pepper is also available as an oil (Chinese: 花椒油, marketed as either "Sichuan pepper oil", "Bunge prickly ash oil", or "huajiao oil"). Sichuan pepper infused oil can be used in dressing, dipping sauces, or any dish in which the flavor of the peppercorn is desired without the texture of the peppercorns themselves.

Hua jiao yan (simplified Chinese: 花椒盐; traditional Chinese: 花椒鹽; pinyin: huājiāoyán) is a mixture of salt and Sichuan pepper, toasted and browned in a wok, and served as a condiment to accompany chicken, duck, and pork dishes.

The leaves of the Sichuan pepper tree are also used in soups and fried foods.

=== Other regions ===
One Himalayan specialty is the momo, a dumpling stuffed with vegetables, cottage cheese, or minced yak or beef, and flavored with Sichuan pepper, garlic, ginger, and onion. In Nepal, the mala flavor is known as timur (टिमुर).

In Bhutan, it is used in preparing ezay (a side dish similar to chutney), to add spiciness to rice porridge (ཐུགཔ་), ba-thup and noodle (buckwheat noodles similar to soba) and other snacks. It is extensively used in preparing blood sausages throughout Bhutan and Tibet.

In Korean cuisine, sancho is often used to accompany fish soups such as chueo-tang.

In Indonesian Batak cuisine, andaliman is ground and mixed with chilies and seasonings into a green sambal or chili paste. Arsik is a typical Indonesian dish containing andaliman.

== Medicinal uses ==
In Traditional Chinese medicine, Zanthoxylum bungeanum has been used as a herbal remedy. It is listed in the Pharmacopoeia of the People's Republic of China and is prescribed for ailments as various as abdominal pains, toothache, and eczema. However, Sichuan pepper has no indications or accepted case for use in evidence-based medicine. Research has revealed that Z. bungeanum can have analgesic, anti-inflammatory, antibacterial, and antioxidant effects in model animals and cell cultures. In rabbits, Z. armatum was experimentally investigated for its potential use in treating gastrointestinal, respiratory, and cardiovascular disorders.

== Phytochemistry ==
Important compounds of various Zanthoxylum species include:

- Zanthoxylum fagara (Central & Southern Africa, South America)—alkaloids, coumarins (Phytochemistry, 27, 3933, 1988)
- Zanthoxylum simulans (Taiwan)—Mostly beta-myrcene, limonene, 1,8-cineole, Z-beta-ocimene (J. Agri. & Food Chem., 44, 1096, 1996)
- Zanthoxylum armatum (Nepal)—linalool (50%), limonene, methyl cinnamate, cineole
- Zanthoxylum rhetsa (India)—Sabinene, limonene, pinenes, para-cymene, terpinenes, 4-terpineol, alpha-terpineol. (Zeitschrift f. Lebensmitteluntersuchung und -forschung A, 206, 228, 1998)
- Zanthoxylum piperitum (Japan [leaves])—citronellal, citronellol, Z-3-hexenal (Bioscience, Biotechnology, and Biochemistry, 61, 491, 1997)
- Zanthoxylum acanthopodium (Indonesia)—citronellal, limonene

== Historical US import ban ==
From 1968 to 2005, the United States Food and Drug Administration banned the importation of Sichuan peppercorns because they were found to be capable of carrying citrus canker (as the tree is in the same family, Rutaceae, as the genus Citrus). This bacterial disease, which is very difficult to control, could potentially harm the foliage and fruit of citrus crops in the U.S. The import ban was only loosely enforced until 2002.

In 2005, the USDA and FDA allowed imports, provided the peppercorns were heated for ten minutes to approximately 140 °F (60 °C) to kill any canker bacteria. Starting in 2007, the USDA no longer required peppercorns to be heated, fully ending the import ban on peppercorns.

== See also ==
- Acmella oleracea (Sichuan buttons)
