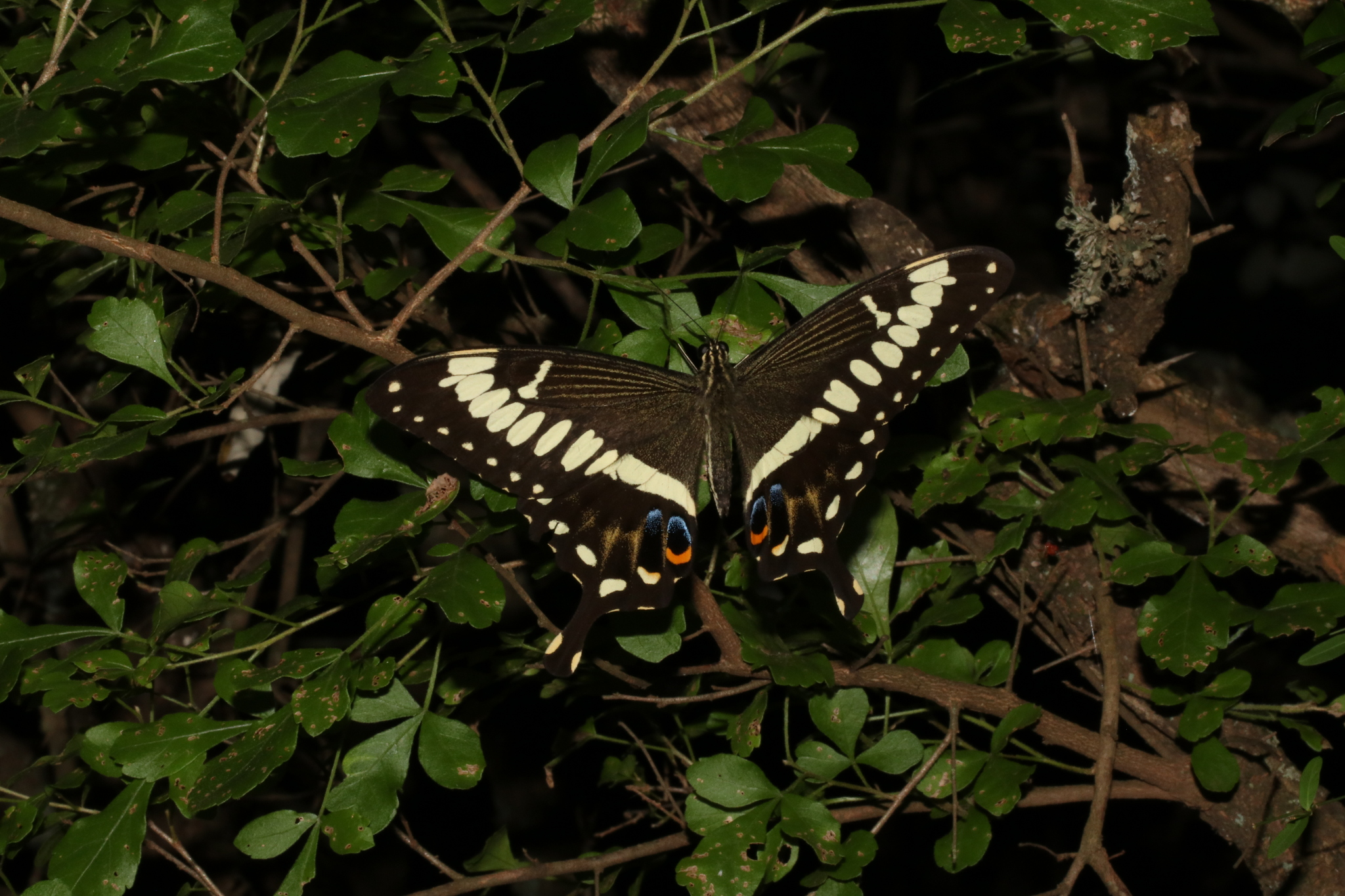

Scientific classification
- Kingdom: Animalia
- Phylum: Arthropoda
- Clade: Pancrustacea
- Class: Insecta
- Order: Lepidoptera
- Family: Papilionidae
- Genus: Papilio
- Species: P. ophidicephalus

Binomial name
- Papilio ophidicephalus Oberthür, 1878

Synonyms
- Papilio ophidicephalus chirinda var. barnesi van Son, 1939

= Papilio ophidicephalus =

Emperor swallowtail

Species of butterfly

Papilio ophidicephalus, the emperor swallowtail, is a butterfly of the family Papilionidae. It is found in Sub-Saharan Africa.

The wingspan is 90–110 mm in males and 100–120 mm in females. It has two broods, one from August to December and the second from January to April.

The larvae feed on Clausena inqequalis, Calodendrum capense, Citrus species, Clausena anisata, Zanthoxylum capense and other Zanthoxylum species.

== Taxonomy ==
Papilio ophidicephalus is a member of the menestheus species group. The members of the clade are:

- Papilio menestheus Drury, 1773
- Papilio lormieri Distant, 1874
- Papilio ophidicephalus Oberthür, 1878

== Subspecies ==
Listed alphabetically:

- P. o. ayresi van Son, 1939 (South Africa, Eswatini)
- P. o. chirinda van Son, 1939 (west-central Mozambique, eastern Zimbabwe)
- P. o. cottrelli van Son, 1966(south-central Zambia)
- P. o. entabeni van Son, 1939 (South Africa: Limpopo Province)
- P. o. mkuwadzi Gifford, 1961 (south-western Tanzania, northern Malawi, north-eastern Zambia)
- P. o. niassicola Storace, 1955 (southern and central Malawi)
- P. o. ophidicephalus Oberthür, 1878 (eastern Kenya, Tanzania, north-eastern Zambia, south-eastern Democratic Republic of the Congo)
- P. o. phalusco Suffert, 1904 (South Africa)
- P. o. transvaalensis van Son, 1939 (South Africa: Limpopo Province)
- P. o. zuluensis van Son, 1939 (South Africa: KwaZulu-Natal to the north-east)

== Gallery ==
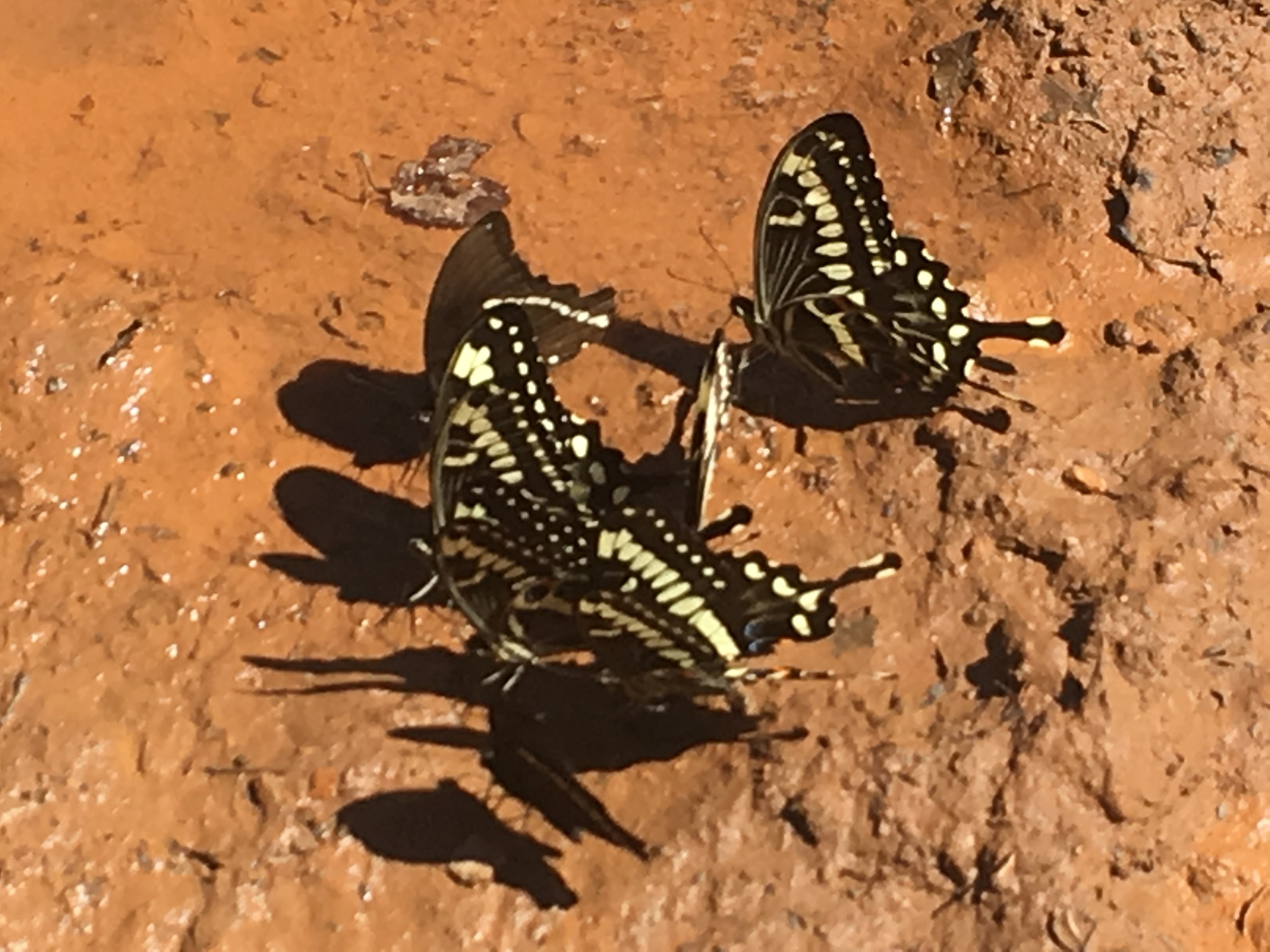
Papilio ophidicephalus ayresi

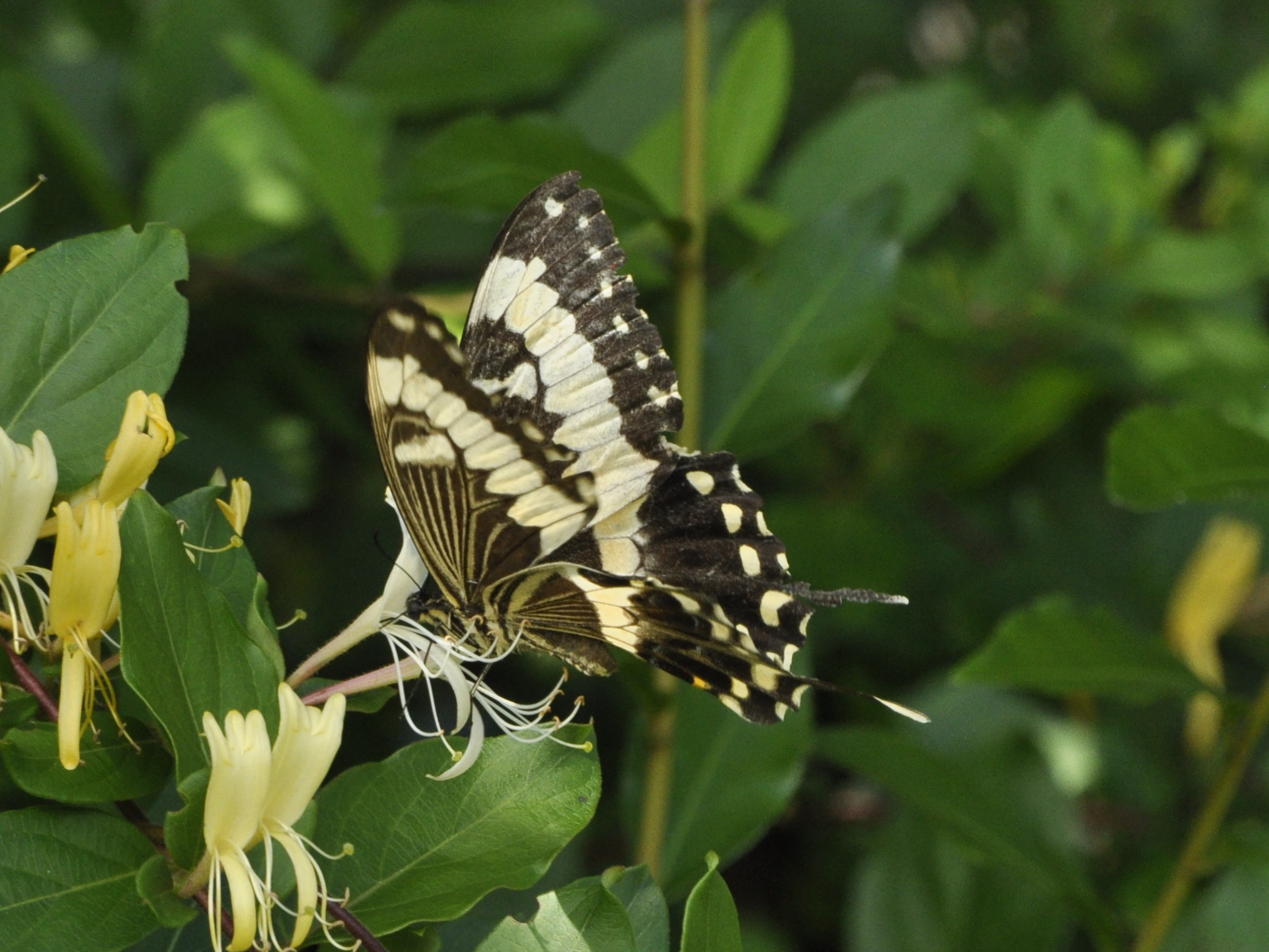
Papilio ophidicephalus chirinda

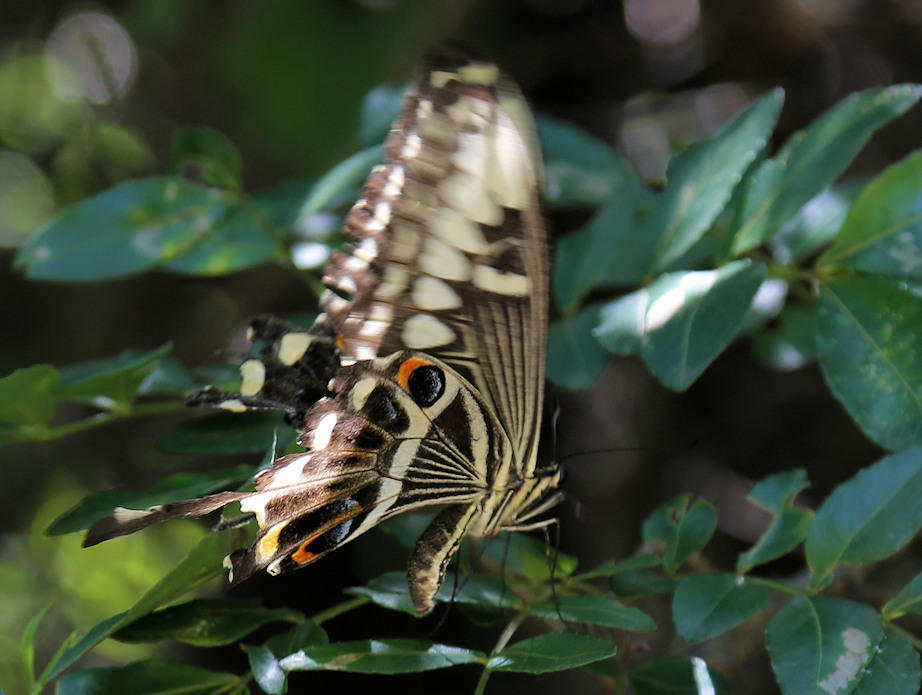
Papilio ophidicephalus phalusco

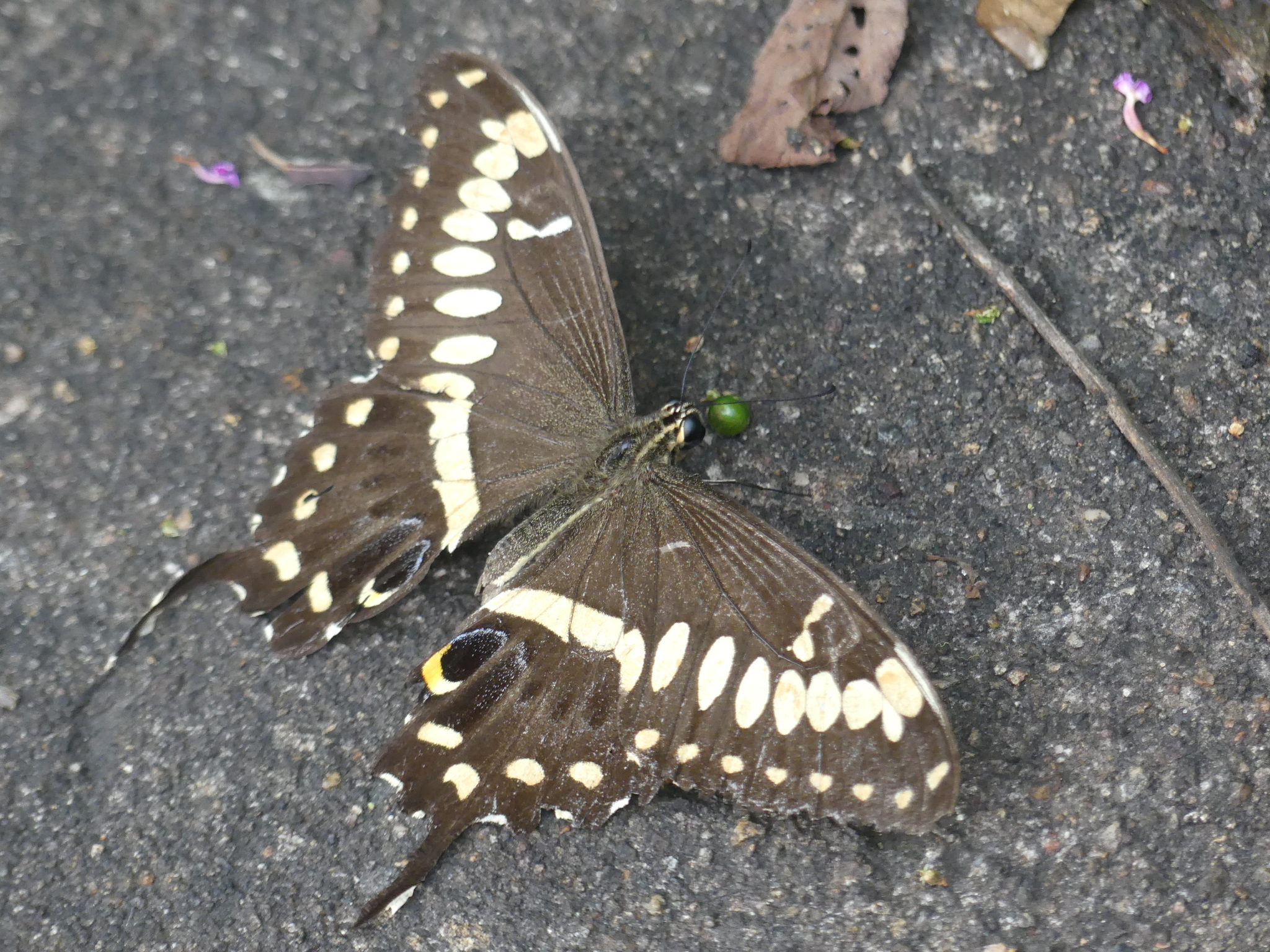
Papilio ophidicephalus transvaalensis
