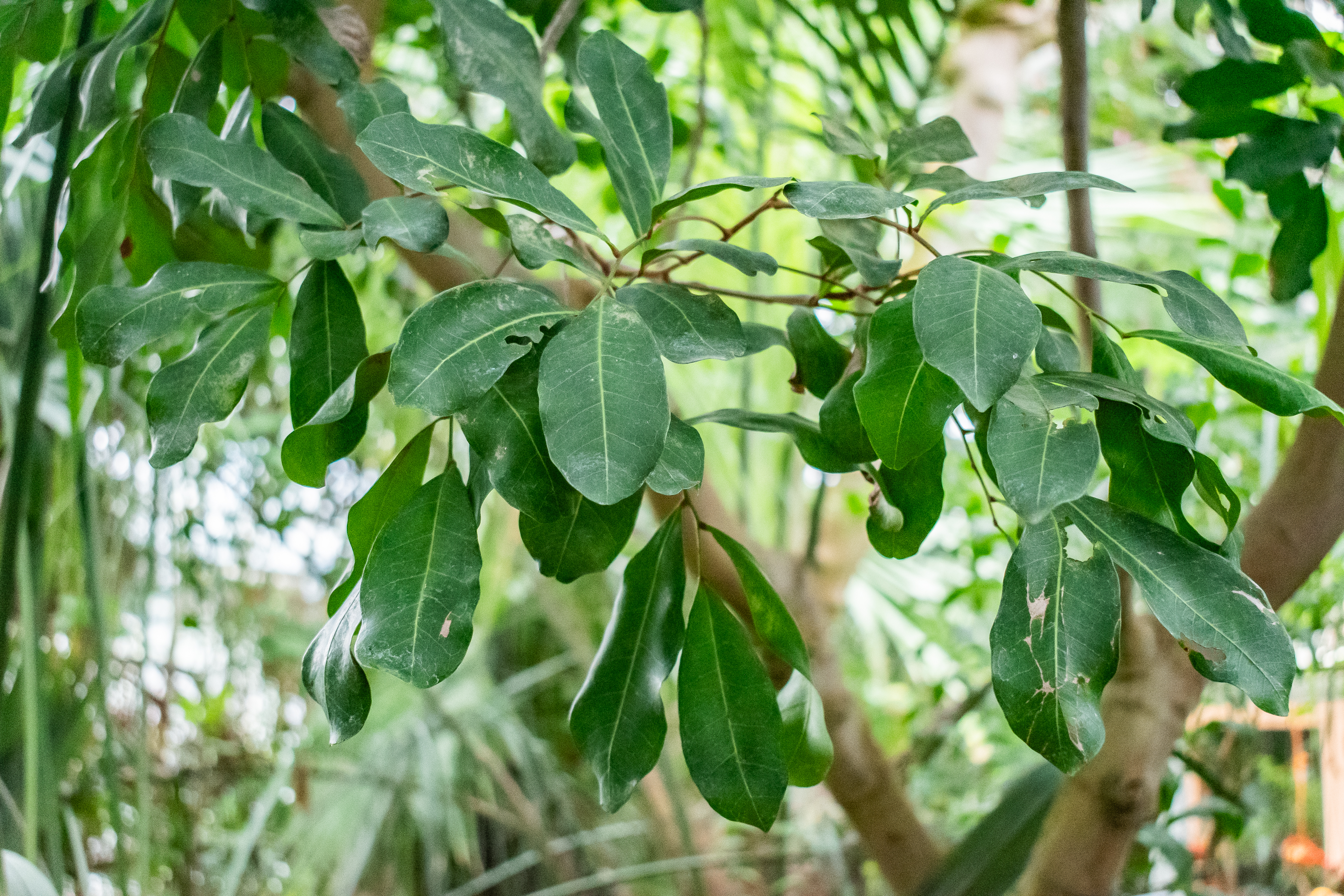

Conservation status
- Least Concern (IUCN 3.1)

Scientific classification
- Kingdom: Plantae
- Clade: Embryophytes
- Clade: Tracheophytes
- Clade: Spermatophytes
- Clade: Angiosperms
- Clade: Eudicots
- Clade: Rosids
- Order: Sapindales
- Family: Rutaceae
- Genus: Zanthoxylum
- Species: Z. bungeanum

Binomial name
- Zanthoxylum bungeanum Maxim.

= Zanthoxylum bungeanum =

Species of flowering plant

Zanthoxylum bungeanum is a species of plant in the family Rutaceae. It is one of the sources of the spice Sichuan pepper. The plant is native to North-Central China, South-Central China, Southeast China, East Himalayas, Inner Mongolia, Manchuria, Nepal, Qinghai, Tibet, Xinjiang. It has also been introduced into Uzbekistan. Studies have shown that essential oils from Z. bungeanum Maxim can be used as a natural pest control agent against the Drugstore beetle pest. Its seed, called Sichuanese Peppercorn, has been served as a traditional medicine and used as cooking spice in China.
