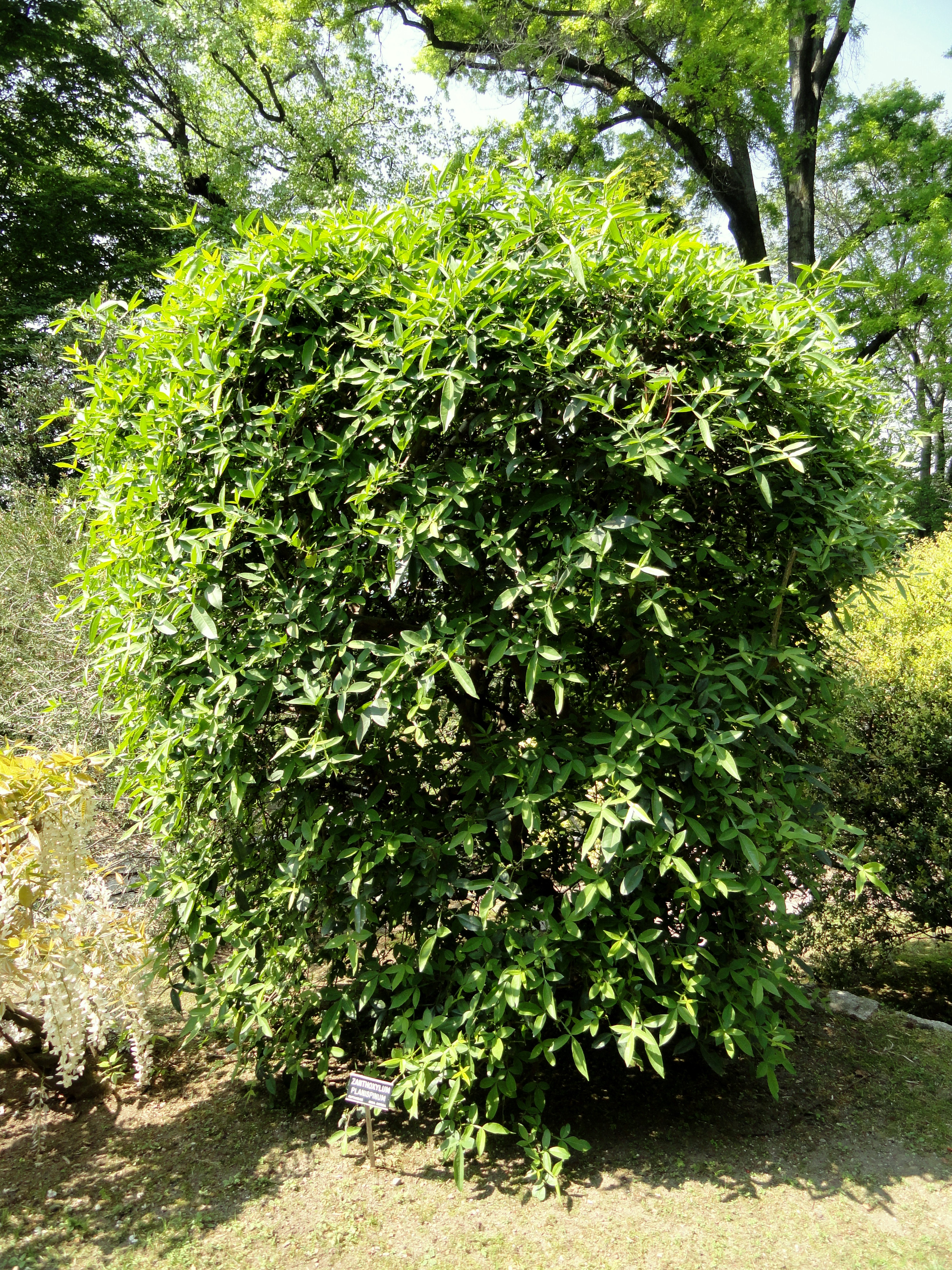

Scientific classification
- Kingdom: Plantae
- Clade: Tracheophytes
- Clade: Angiosperms
- Clade: Eudicots
- Clade: Rosids
- Order: Sapindales
- Family: Rutaceae
- Genus: Zanthoxylum
- Species: Z. armatum

Binomial name
- Zanthoxylum armatum DC.

Varieties
- Zanthoxylum armatum var. armatum; Zanthoxylum armatum var. ferrugineum (Rehder & E.H.Wilson) C.C.Huang

Synonyms
- var. armatum: Fagara alata var. tomentosa M.Hiroe; Zanthoxylum alatum Roxb.; Zanthoxylum alatum var. planispinum (Siebold & Zucc.) Rehder & E.H.Wilson; Zanthoxylum alatum f. subtrifoliolatum Franch.; Zanthoxylum arenosum Reeder & S.Y.Cheo; Zanthoxylum armatum var. subtrifoliatum (Franch.) Kitam.; Zanthoxylum bungei Hance; Zanthoxylum hostile Wall.; Zanthoxylum planispinum Siebold & Zucc.; Zanthoxylum violaceum Wall.; var. ferrugineum: Zanthoxylum alatum f. ferrugineum Rehder & E.H.Wilson; Zanthoxylum planispinum f. ferrugineum (Rehder & E.H.Wilson) C.C.Huang

= Zanthoxylum armatum =

Species of flowering plant

Zanthoxylum armatum, also called winged prickly ash or rattan pepper in English, is a species of plant in the family Rutaceae. It is an aromatic, deciduous, spiny shrub growing to 3.5 metres (11 ft) in height, endemic from Pakistan across to Southeast Asia and up to Korea and Japan. It is one of the sources of the spice Sichuan pepper, and also used in folk medicine, essential oil production and as an ornamental garden plant.

== Description ==
The plant grows as a woody climber, a shrub or a tree, up to 3.5 metres (11 ft) in height. It is deciduous, with subsessile, opposite leaves of lanceolate, obovate or elliptic shape. Branchlets and leaves have prickles/spines. The young branchlets and inflorescence rachises are glabrous or the young branches are sparsely pubescent. The rachis of the leaves is pubescent glabrous or rust-colored and has wings to 6 mm on each side, hence it common English name, this is one of the anatomical features distinguishing it from other Zanthoxylum species. Other anatomically separating features are generally faint secondary veins of leaflet blades, especially adaxially, with 7-15 on each side of midvein; the anthers of the male flowers are yellow before anthesis; and the gynoecium of the female flowers is 1-3-carpelled. Fruit follicles are purplish-red, about 4-5mm in diameter, while the seeds are black and 3-4mm in size. The shrub flowers in China from April to May, and fruits from August to October, in Nepal it flowers during the same months, while the fruit is available all year round. In India, flowering is from March to April.

== Taxonomy ==
The species was described by the eminent Swiss botanist Augustin Pyramus de Candolle in 1824.

The plant has an accepted infraspecific, Zanthoxylum armatum var. ferrugineum (Rehder & E.H.Wilson) C.C.Huang. This variety has rust-coloured pubescent young branchlets and inflorescence rachises distinguishing it from the nominative variety.

== Distribution ==
Zanthoxylum armatum is native to parts of East and Southeast Asia, and the north of the Indian sub-continent. It is naturalised in several regions. Regions where it occurs are: Japan; Nansei-shoto/Ryukyu Islands; Korea; North-Central, South-Central & Southeast China, specifically Anhui, Fujian, South Gansu, Guangdong, Guangxi, Guizhou, South Henan, Hubei, Hunan, Jiangsu, Jiangxi, Shaanxi, Shandong, South Shanxi, Sichuan, Xizang, Yunnan, and Zhejiang; northern Taiwan; Philippines; Vietnam; Laos; Thailand; Myanmar; Bangladesh; India, including Assam; Bhutan; Nepal; Tibet; the Eastern and Western Himalayas; Kashmir; and Pakistan, and possibly Indonesia. It has been naturalised in Northeast Argentina and the North Caucasus.

The variety ferrugineum occurs in North-Central, South-Central & Southeast China, specifically in Guangdong, Guangxi, Guizhou, Hunan, Shaanxi, Sichuan and Yunnan.

== Habitat and ecology ==
Zanthoxylum armatum grows in many habitats below 3100m. In the Salyan District, Nepal, the shrub grows in the understorey of lower altitude Pinus roxburghii forests, alongside Aesculus indica and Bassia latifolia, and in higher altitude oak forests (Quercus incana & Q. lanuginosa), where they associate with Rhododendron arboreum & Lyonia ovalifolia. Birds like the fruits and widely disseminate the plants.

== Vernacular names ==
Zanthoxylum armatum is known by a number of vernacular names. In China, the plant and its fresh berries are known as téngjiāo (Chinese: 藤椒), while the dried seeds are known as qinghuajiao (Chinese: 青花椒) or majiao (Chinese: 麻椒). Other names include: Qanadlı zantoksilum (Azerbaijani); Dambara in Pashto, तेजफल tejphal, darmar, tumru, timroo, trimal (Hindi); ꯃꯨꯛꯊ꯭ꯔꯨꯕꯤ মুক্থ্ৰূবী mukthrubi (Manipuri); तिमुर timur (Tamil); konda-kasimi (Telugu); ಜಿಮ್ಮೀ jimmi (Kannada); തൂമ്പണലരി (Malayalam); hokum (Adi); ganya (Angami); winged prickly ash, prickly ash, toothache tree, yellow wood, suterberry (English); tumbru, tejbal (other names in India); arhrikreh (Mizo); टिमुर timur (Nepali); หมักก้าก h̄mạk k̂āk, hui-jiao (Thai); Sẻn gai (Vietnamese); 竹叶花椒 zhúyè huājiāo (Standard Chinese); flügelstachelige Stachelesche (German); and Mongmong (Ao Naga). The variety ferrugineum has the name 毛竹叶花椒 máo zhúyè huājiāo in Standard Chinese.

== Uses ==
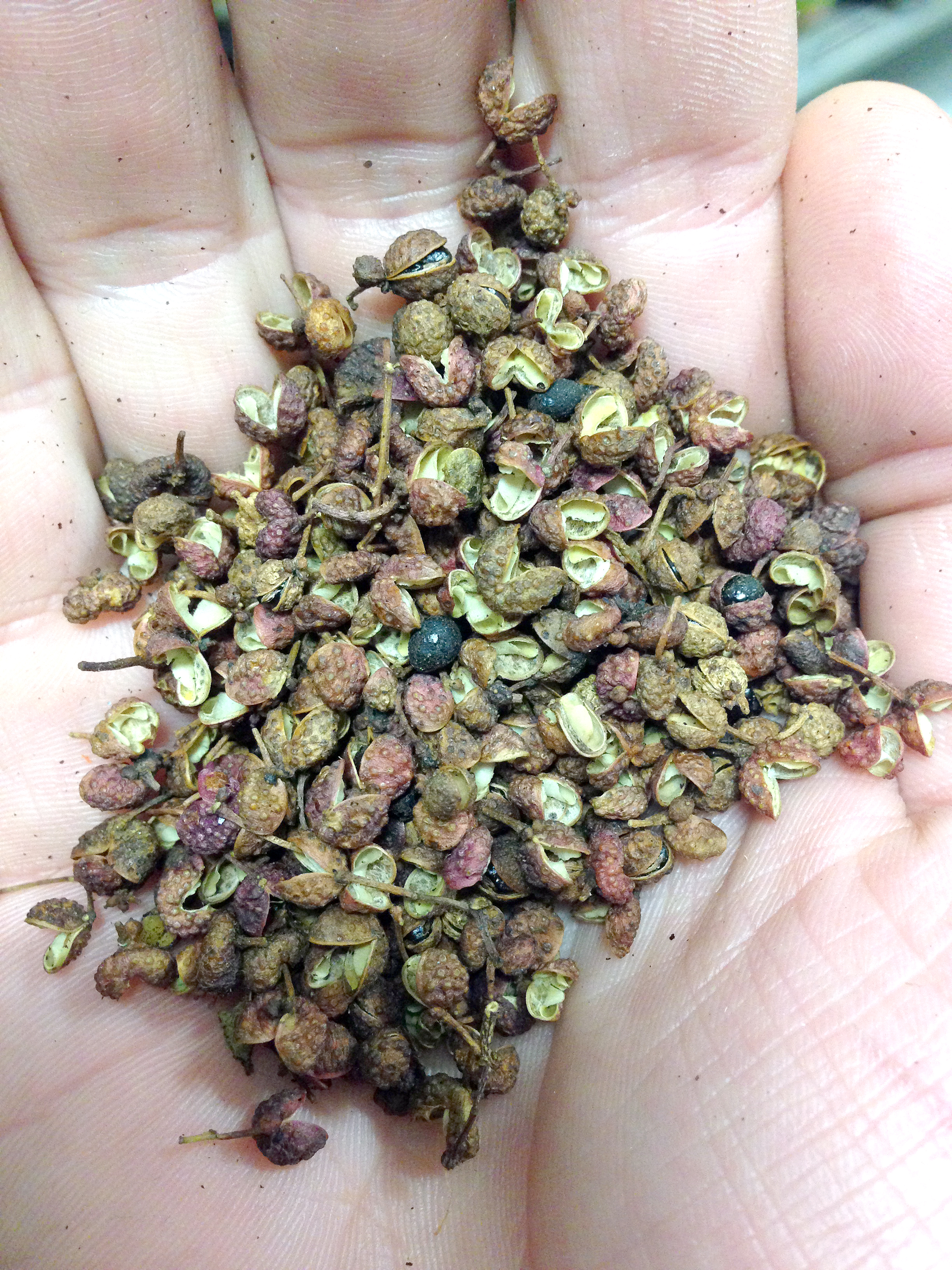
A handful of dried green Sichuan pepper

The fruit and seeds of the plant are used as a spice, timut pepper, related to Sichuan pepper, but less pungent, while the bark, fruit and seeds are used in indigenous medicines in India, Nepal and Thailand. The plant is also a source of an essential oil, Wartara Oil, and the shrub is also grown as an ornamental garden plant.

Timur is prominent in Nepalese cuisine, where it is prized for its aroma and numbing sensation, often used in cooking sauces, pickles, meats, dumplings, and various other dishes. It is especially characteristic of the food of Western Nepal.

In the Salyan district of Nepal, the parts used in medicine are harvested primarily of export to India. The plants grow in state-controlled, community-controlled and private lands, resulting in a variety of access regimes, harvesting regimes and management practices, leading to a conclusion that in general the effects of supply and demand on Non-timber forest products (NTFP) cannot be generalised, but are specific to each product and place.

Extracts have been shown to inhibit the growth of Porphyromonas gingivalis – the main bacteria involved in Periodontal disease and suspected cause of Alzheimer's disease.
