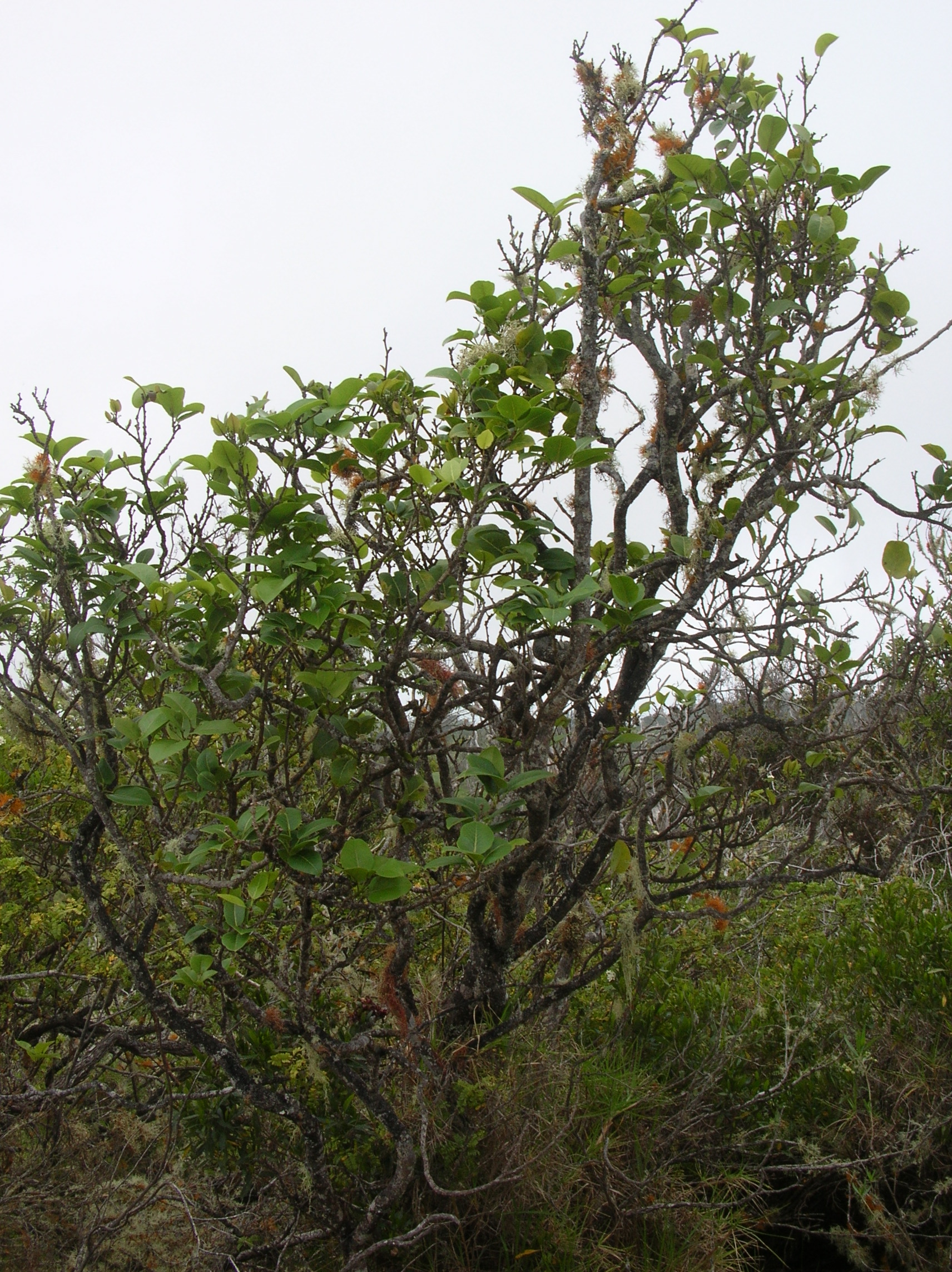

Conservation status
- Near Threatened (IUCN 2.3)

Scientific classification
- Kingdom: Plantae
- Clade: Tracheophytes
- Clade: Angiosperms
- Clade: Eudicots
- Clade: Rosids
- Order: Sapindales
- Family: Rutaceae
- Genus: Zanthoxylum
- Species: Z. kauaense

Binomial name
- Zanthoxylum kauaense A.Gray

= Zanthoxylum kauaense =

Species of tree

Zanthoxylum kauaense, commonly known as aʻe or Kauaʻi pricklyash, is a species of flowering plant in the family Rutaceae, that is endemic to Hawaii. It usually inhabits mixed mesic forests at elevations of 300–1,980 m (980–6,500 ft), but can also be found in dry and wet forests. It is threatened by habitat loss.
