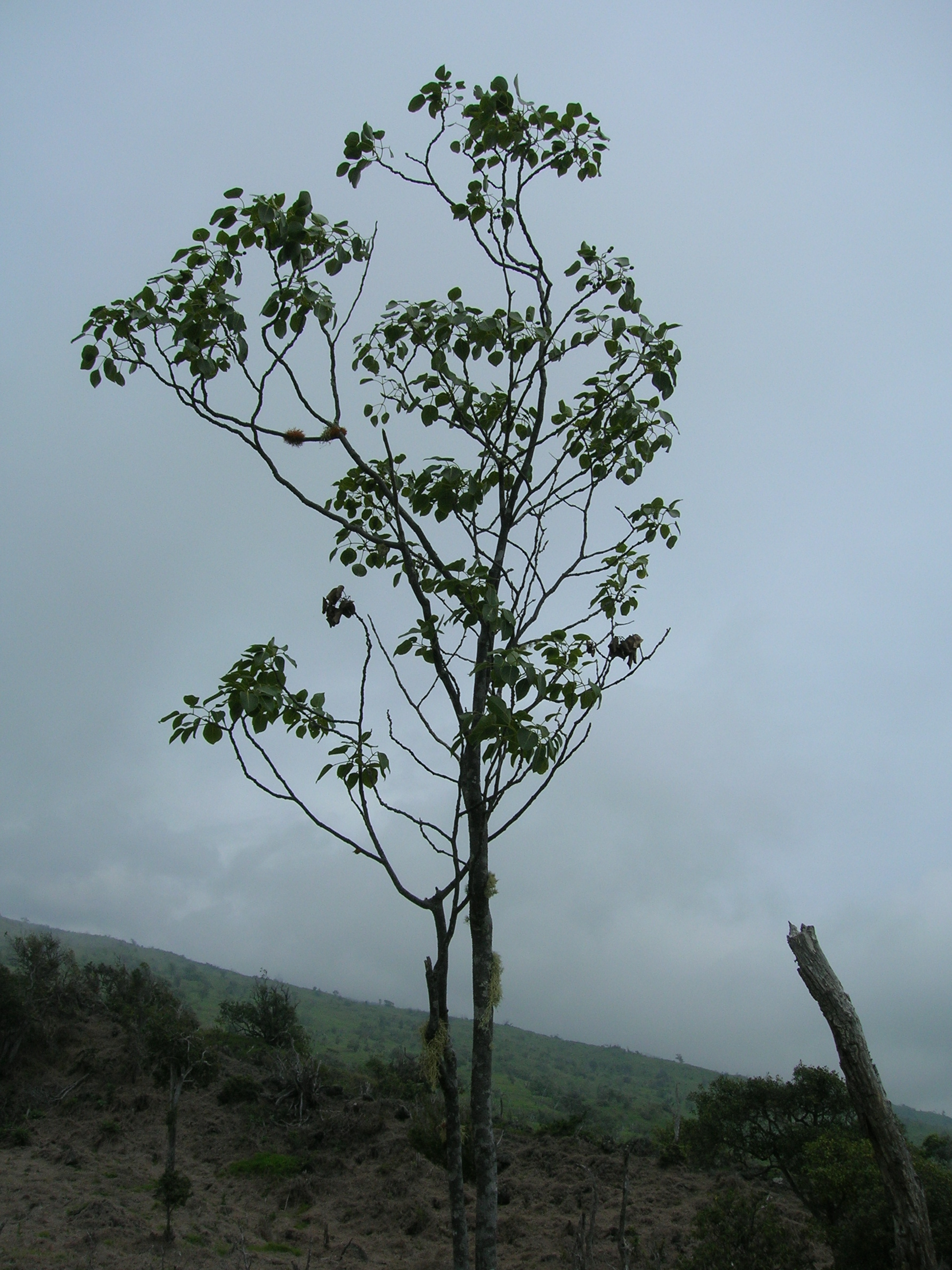

Conservation status
- Endangered (IUCN 2.3)

Scientific classification
- Kingdom: Plantae
- Clade: Tracheophytes
- Clade: Angiosperms
- Clade: Eudicots
- Clade: Rosids
- Order: Sapindales
- Family: Rutaceae
- Genus: Zanthoxylum
- Species: Z. hawaiiense

Binomial name
- Zanthoxylum hawaiiense Hillebr.

= Zanthoxylum hawaiiense =

Species of tree

Zanthoxylum hawaiiense, commonly known aʻe or Hawaiʻi pricklyash, is a species of flowering plant in the family Rutaceae, that is endemic to Hawaii. It can be found at elevations of 550–1,740 m (1,800–5,710 ft) in dry forests, where it grows on lava flows, and mixed mesic forests on the Island of Hawaiʻi, Maui, Molokaʻi, and Lānaʻi. It is threatened by habitat loss.

Zanthoxylum is from the Greek ξανθὸν ξύλον, meaning "yellow wood."

This is the only genus in the citrus family (Rutaceae) with a pantropical distribution.

Zanthoxylum also colonized several Pacific Islands and the Hawaiian clade shows phylogenetic incongruence between the plastid and nuclear datasets, suggesting hybridization. The Hawaiian species are one of the rare examples of endemic Hawaiian lineages that are older than the current main islands.
