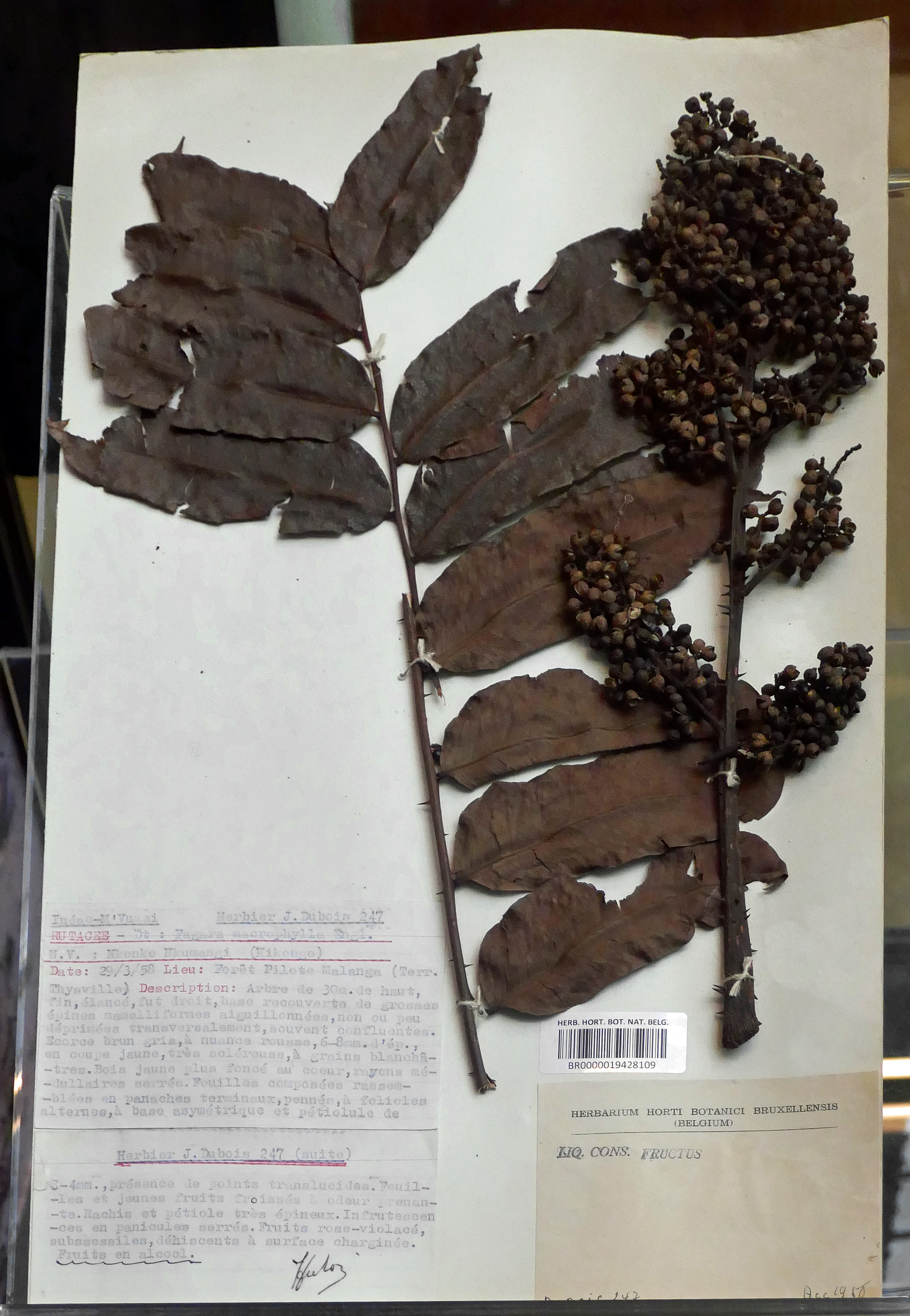

Conservation status
- Least Concern (IUCN 3.1)

Scientific classification
- Kingdom: Plantae
- Clade: Tracheophytes
- Clade: Angiosperms
- Clade: Eudicots
- Clade: Rosids
- Order: Sapindales
- Family: Rutaceae
- Genus: Zanthoxylum
- Species: Z. gilletii

Binomial name
- Zanthoxylum gilletii (De Wild.) P.G.Waterman (1975)

Synonyms
- Fagara amaniensis Engl.; Fagara gilletii De Wild.; Fagara inaequalis Engl.; Fagara macrophylla (Oliv.) Engl.; Fagara tessmannii Engl.; Zanthoxylum macrophyllum Oliv.

= Zanthoxylum gilletii =

Species of tree

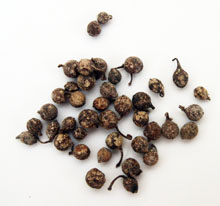
Dried uzazi fruits

Zanthoxylum gilletii, the East African satinwood, is a tree species in the genus Zanthoxylum found in Africa. The fruits are used to produce the spice uzazi, which is the Nigerian (Igbo language) name of both the plant and the spice. It is native to Central and West Africa, and a close relative of the Sichuan pepper. "Uzazi" usually refers specifically to the spice made from its fruit and pericarp, though sometimes other parts of it such as its leaves are used.

== Description ==
Each bunch contains 20 to 30 berries. Each berry is round, has a size of 3.5 to 6 mm (1/8 inch to 1/4 inch), has a stalk, and contains a large black seed. The berry turns red when ripe. The berries contain the alkaloid sanshool.

== Use ==
=== Fruit ===
The fruit is described as spicy and pungent, more so than Sichuan pepper, and bitter. It is usually used by grinding it into a powder and adding it into soups, stews, seasonings, and sauces. Even in West Africa this is a rare spice, and typically only five or six dried fruit are added to a dish.

In herbal medicine, it is used to treat tumors and wounds.

The name of the spice is derived from Igbo, a language in Nigeria, where the spice is grown and harvested on a commercial basis.

== Chemistry ==
The alkaloid nitidine can be isolated from the plant.

The amide alkaloids N-(4-hydroxyphenethyl)octacosanamide, N-(4-hydroxyphenethyl)hexacosanamide, N-(4-hydroxyphenethyl)decanamide, N-vanilloyltyramine and N-[O-docosanoylvanilloyl]tyramine can be isolated from the stem bark. The lignan sesamin, the N-isobutylamide γ-sanshool, the acridone alkaloids 1-hydroxy-3-methoxy-N-methylacridone, arborinine, xanthoxoline and 1-hydroxy-3-methoxyacridone can also be extracted from the bark as well as the alkaloids oblongine, tembetarine and magnoflorine and the flavonoid hesperidin.
